= Elbridge Gerry =

Founding Father, U.S. vice president (1813–1814)

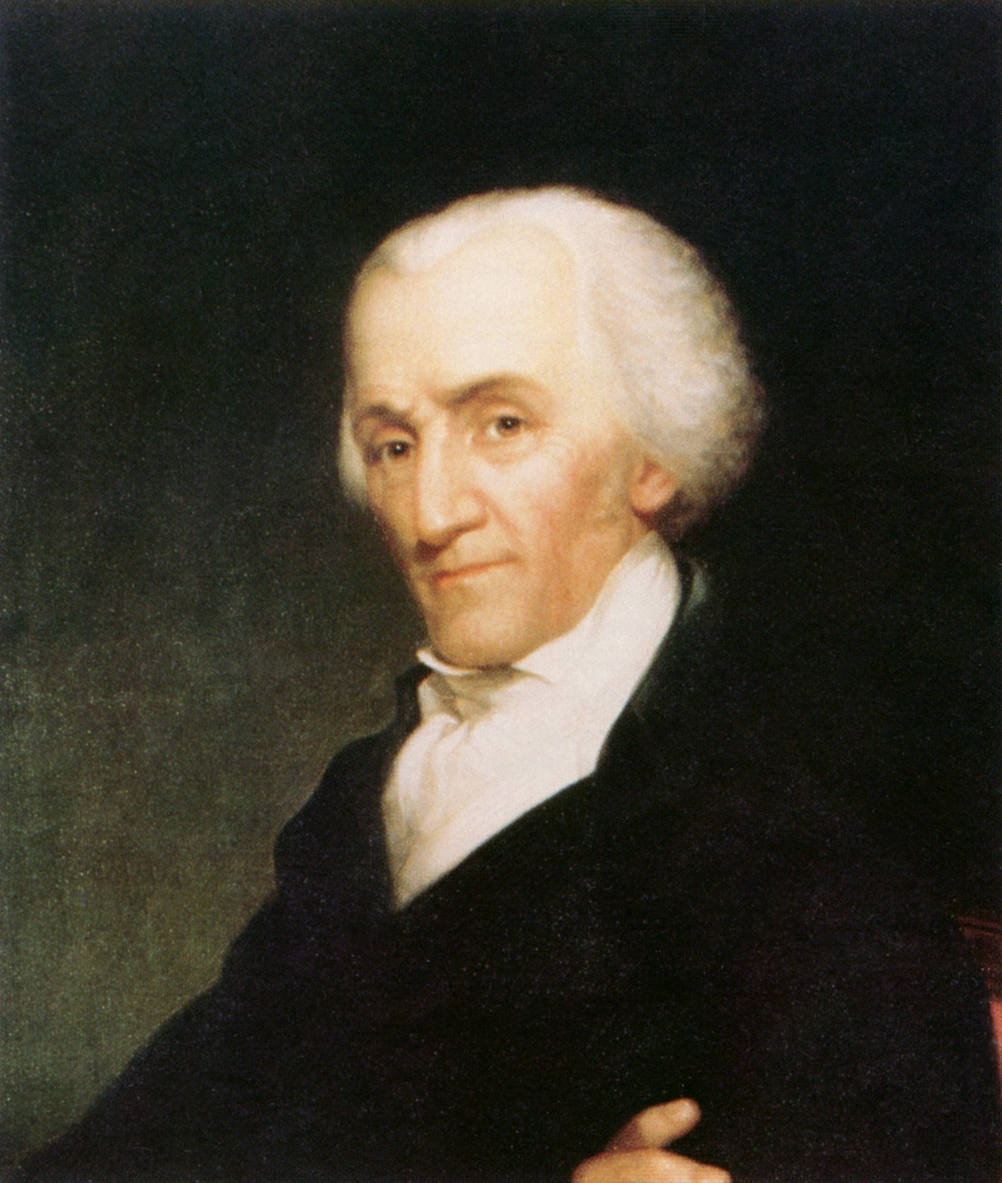
- Posthumous portrait, c. 1861

5th Vice President of the United States
- In office March 4, 1813 – November 23, 1814
- President: James Madison
- Preceded by: George Clinton
- Succeeded by: Daniel D. Tompkins

9th Governor of Massachusetts
- In office June 10, 1810 – June 5, 1812
- Lieutenant: William Gray
- Preceded by: Christopher Gore
- Succeeded by: Caleb Strong

Member of the U.S. House of Representatives from Massachusetts's 3rd district
- In office March 4, 1789 – March 3, 1793
- Preceded by: District established
- Succeeded by: Shearjashub Bourne; Peleg Coffin Jr.

Member of the Congress of the Confederation from Massachusetts
- In office June 30, 1783 – September 1785

Member of the Continental Congress from Massachusetts
- In office February 9, 1776 – February 19, 1780

Personal details
- Born: July 17, 1744 Marblehead, Province of Massachusetts Bay, British America
- Died: November 23, 1814 (aged 70) Washington, District of Columbia, U.S.
- Resting place: Congressional Cemetery (Washington, D.C.)
- Party: Democratic-Republican
- Spouse: Ann Thompson (m. 1786)
- Children: 10, including Thomas Russell Gerry
- Education: Harvard College (BA, MA)

Elbridge Thomas Gerry (/ˈɡɛri/; 17 July [O.S. 6 July] 1744 – November 23, 1814) was an American Founding Father, merchant, politician, and diplomat, who was a member of the Second Continental Congress, and signed the Declaration of Independence and Articles of Confederation. From 1813 until his death in 1814, he served as the fifth vice president of the United States under President James Madison. The political practice of gerrymandering is named after him.

Born into a wealthy merchant family, Gerry vocally opposed British colonial policy in the 1760s and was active in the early stages of organizing the resistance in the American Revolutionary War. In addition to signing the Declaration and the Articles, he was one of three men who attended the Constitutional Convention in 1787, but refused to sign the Constitution because originally it did not include a Bill of Rights. After its ratification, he was elected to the inaugural United States Congress, where he was actively involved in the drafting and passage of the Bill of Rights as an advocate of individual and state liberties.

Gerry was at first opposed to the idea of political parties and cultivated enduring friendships on both sides of the political divide between Federalists and Democratic-Republicans. He was a member of a diplomatic delegation to France that was treated poorly in the XYZ Affair, in which Federalists held him responsible for a breakdown in negotiations. Gerry thereafter became a Democratic-Republican, running unsuccessfully for Governor of Massachusetts several times before winning the office in 1810. During his second term, the legislature approved new state senate districts that led to the coining of the word "gerrymander"; he lost the next election, although the state senate remained Democratic-Republican.

Gerry was nominated by the Democratic-Republican party and elected as vice president in the 1812 election. Advanced in age and in poor health, Gerry served 21 months of his term before dying in office. Gerry is the only signatory of the Declaration of Independence to be buried in Washington, DC.

== Early life and education ==
Elbridge Thomas Gerry was born on July 17, 1744, in the North Shore town of Marblehead, Massachusetts. His father, Thomas Gerry (1702–1774), was a merchant who operated ships out of Marblehead, and his mother, Elizabeth (Greenleaf) Gerry (1716–1771), was the daughter of a successful Boston merchant. Gerry's first name came from John Elbridge, one of his mother's ancestors. Gerry's parents had 11 children in all, although only five survived to adulthood. Of these, Elbridge was the third. He was first educated by private tutors and entered Harvard College shortly before turning 14. After receiving a bachelor of arts degree in 1762 and a master of arts in 1765, he entered his father's merchant business. By the 1770s, the Gerrys numbered among the wealthiest Massachusetts merchants, with trading connections in Spain, the West Indies, and along the North American coast. Gerry's father, who had emigrated from England in 1730, was active in local politics and had a leading role in the local militia.

== Colonial business and politics ==
Gerry was from an early time a vocal opponent of Parliamentary efforts to tax the colonies after the French and Indian War ended in 1763. In 1770, he sat on a Marblehead committee that sought to enforce importation bans on taxed British goods. He frequently communicated with other Massachusetts opponents of British policy, including Samuel Adams, John Adams, Mercy Otis Warren, and others.

In May 1772, he won election to the Great and General Court of the Province of Massachusetts Bay, which served as the state's legislative assembly. He worked closely with Samuel Adams to advance colonial opposition to Parliamentary colonial policies. He was responsible for establishing Marblehead's committee of correspondence, one of the first to be set up after that of Boston. However, an incident of mob action prompted him to resign from the committee the next year. Gerry and other prominent Marbleheaders had established a hospital for performing smallpox inoculations on Cat Island; because the means of transmission of the disease were not known at the time, fears among the local population led to protests, which escalated into violence that wrecked the hospital and threatened the proprietors' other properties.

Gerry re-entered politics after the Boston Port Act closed that city's port in 1774, and Marblehead became an alternative port to which relief supplies from other colonies could be delivered. As one of the town's leading merchants and Patriots, Gerry played a major role in ensuring the storage and delivery of supplies from Marblehead to Boston, interrupting those activities only to care for his dying father. He was elected as a representative to the First Continental Congress in September 1774, but declined, still grieving the loss of his father.

== American Revolution ==
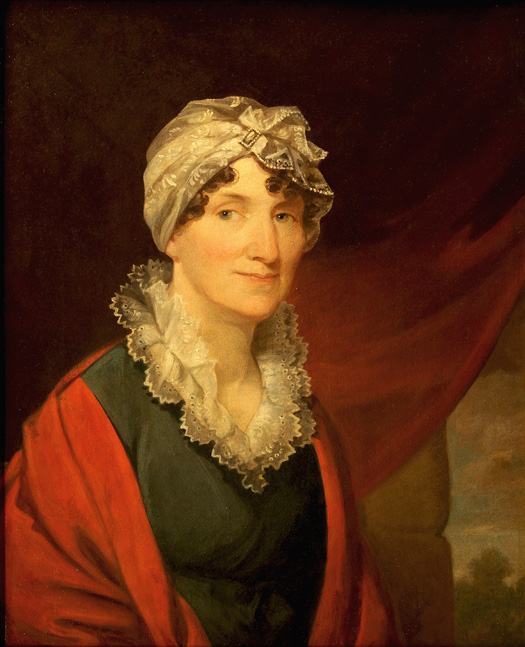
Ann Thompson

Gerry was elected to the provincial assembly, which reconstituted itself as the Massachusetts Provincial Congress after Governor Thomas Gage dissolved the body in October 1774. He was assigned to its committee of safety, responsible for ensuring that the province's limited supplies of weapons and gunpowder did not fall into British hands. His actions were partly responsible for the storage of weapons and ammunition in Concord; these stores were the target of the British expedition that sparked the start of the American Revolutionary War with the battles of Lexington and Concord in April 1775. (Gerry was staying at an inn at Menotomy, now Arlington, when the British Army marched through on the night of April 18.) During the Siege of Boston that followed, Gerry continued to take a leading role in supplying the nascent Continental Army, something he continued to do as the war progressed. He leveraged business contacts in France and Spain to acquire not just munitions, but also supplies of all types, and was involved in the transfer of financial subsidies from Spain to Congress. He sent ships to ports all along the American coast and dabbled in financing privateering operations against British merchant shipping.

Unlike some other merchants, no evidence indicates that Gerry profiteered directly from the hostilities. He spoke out against price gouging and in favor of price controls, although his war-related merchant activities notably increased the family's wealth. His gains were tempered to some extent by the precipitous decline in the value of paper currencies, which he held in large quantities and speculated.

Gerry served in the Second Continental Congress in Philadelphia from February 1776 to 1780, when matters of the ongoing war occupied the body's attention. He was influential in convincing several delegates to support passage of the Declaration of Independence in the debates held during the summer of 1776; John Adams wrote of him, "If every Man here was a Gerry, the Liberties of America would be safe against the Gates of Earth and Hell." He was implicated as a member of the so-called "Conway Cabal", a group of congressmen and military officers who were dissatisfied with the performance of General George Washington during the 1777 military campaign. However, Gerry took Pennsylvania leader Thomas Mifflin, one of Washington's critics, to task early in the episode and specifically denied knowledge of any sort of conspiracy against Washington in February 1778.

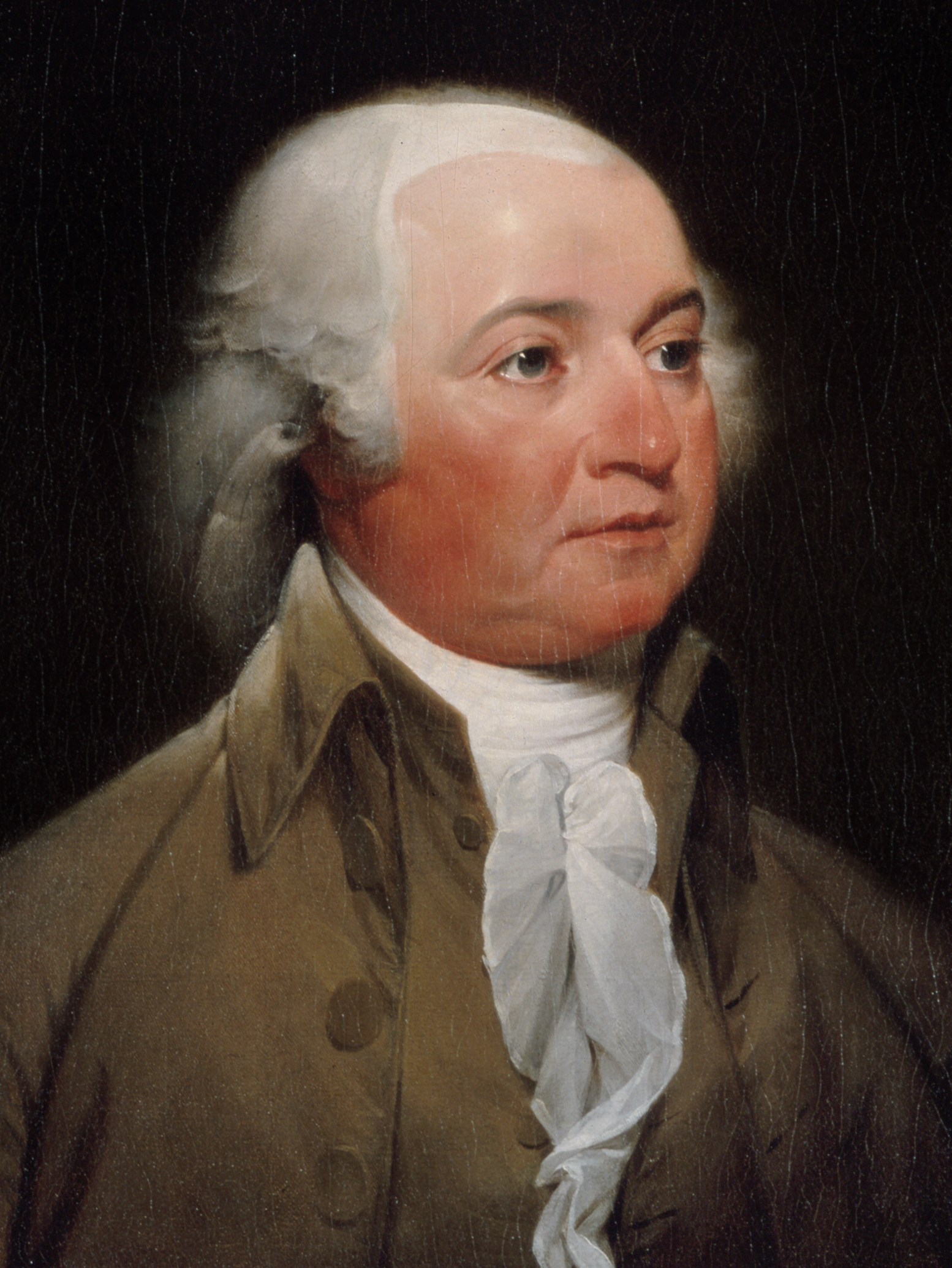
John Adams, who held Gerry in high regard, 1793, by John Trumbull

Gerry's political philosophy was one of limited central government, and he regularly advocated for the maintenance of civilian control of the military. He held these positions fairly consistently throughout his political career (wavering principally on the need for stronger central government in the wake of the 1786–87 Shays' Rebellion) and was well known for his personal integrity. In later years, he opposed the idea of political parties, remaining somewhat distant from both the developing Federalist and Democratic-Republican parties until later in his career. Until 1800, he had not formally associated with the Democratic-Republicans in opposition to what he saw as attempts by the Federalists to centralize too much power in the national government.

In 1780, he resigned from the Continental Congress over the issue and refused offers from the state legislature to return to the Congress. He also refused appointment to the state senate, claiming he would be more effective in the state's lower chamber, and also refused appointment as a county judge, comparing the offer by Governor John Hancock to those made by royally appointed governors to benefit their political allies. He was elected a fellow of the American Academy of Arts and Sciences in 1781.

Gerry was convinced to rejoin the Confederation Congress in 1783, when the state legislature agreed to support his call for needed reforms. He served in that body, which met in New York City, until September 1785. The following year, he married Ann Thompson, the daughter of a wealthy New York City merchant who was 20 years his junior; his best man was his good friend James Monroe. The couple had 10 children between 1787 and 1801, straining Ann's health.

The war made Gerry sufficiently wealthy that when it ended, he sold off his merchant interests and began investing in land. In 1787, he purchased the Cambridge, Massachusetts, estate of the last royal lieutenant governor of Massachusetts, Thomas Oliver, which had been confiscated by the state. This 100-acre (40 ha) property, known as Elmwood, became the family home for the rest of Gerry's life. He continued to own property in Marblehead and bought several properties in other Massachusetts communities. He also owned shares in the Ohio Company, prompting some political opponents to characterize him as an owner of vast tracts of western lands.

=== Constitutional Convention ===
Gerry played a major role in the Constitutional Convention held in Philadelphia during the summer of 1787. In its deliberations, he consistently advocated for a strong delineation between state and federal governmental powers, with state legislatures shaping the membership of federal government positions. Gerry's opposition to popular election of representatives was rooted in part by the events of Shays' Rebellion in western Massachusetts in the year preceding the convention. He also sought to maintain individual liberties by providing checks on government power that might abuse or limit those freedoms.

He supported the idea that the Senate composition should not be determined by population; the view that it should instead be composed of equal numbers of members for each state prevailed in the Connecticut Compromise. The compromise was adopted on a narrow vote in which the Massachusetts delegation was divided, Gerry and Caleb Strong voting in favor. Gerry further proposed that senators of a state, rather than casting a single vote on behalf of the state, vote instead as individuals. Gerry was also vocal in opposing the Three-fifths Compromise, which counted slaves as three-fifths of the slave population for the purposes of determining the number of each states' votes in the House of Representatives and the Electoral College. The Southern states wanted the full slave population to be counted, whereas the Northern states did not want them to count at all. Gerry asked, why should "blacks, who were property in the South", count toward representation "any more than the Cattle & horses of the North"? Gerry opposed slavery and said the Constitution should have "nothing to do" with slavery so as "not to sanction it."

Gerry's preference for a more highly centralized government throughout most of the Convention was not motivated by a desire for great social changes, but was intended rather to restrain such popular excesses as were evidenced in Shays's Rebellion.... [H]e defended popular rights when the people appeared to be threatened by some powerful interest groups, and he called for restraints on popular influence when the people seemed to be gaining the upper hand too much.

— George Athan Billias

Because of his fear of demagoguery and belief the people of the United States could be easily misled, Gerry also advocated indirect elections. Although he was unsuccessful in obtaining them for the lower house of Congress, Gerry did obtain such indirect elections for the Senate, whose members were to be selected by the state legislatures. Gerry also advanced numerous proposals for indirect elections of the President of the United States, most of them involving limiting the right to vote to the state governors and electors.

Gerry was unhappy about the lack of enumeration of any specific individual liberties in the proposed constitution and generally opposed proposals that strengthened the central government. He was one of only three delegates who voted against the proposed constitution in the convention (the others were George Mason and Edmund Randolph), citing a concern about the convention's lack of authority to enact such major changes to the nation's system of government and to the constitution's lack of "federal features." Ultimately, Gerry refused to sign because of concerns over the rights of private citizens and the power of the legislature to raise armies and revenue.

Of the members of the House, eight had been in the Constitutional Convention, and, of these, six voted with the majority, and two, Roger Sherman and Eldridge Gerry, the latter of whom had refused to sign the Constitution, voted in the minority.

Gerry's vote was consistent with the objections he had raised at the Constitutional Convention. Although he favored a stronger union than that provided by the Articles of Confederation, he opposed ratification of the proposed Constitution without amendments protecting individual rights, making him one of only three delegates who attended the Convention but refused to sign it.

=== State ratification and Bill of Rights ===
During the ratification debates that took place in the states following the convention, Gerry continued his opposition, publishing a widely circulated letter documenting his objections to the proposed constitution. In the document, he cites the lack of a Bill of Rights as his primary objection but also expresses qualified approval of the Constitution, indicating that he would accept it with some amendment. Strong pro-Constitution forces attacked him in the press, comparing him unfavorably to the Shaysites. Henry Jackson was particularly vicious: "[Gerry has] done more injury to this country by that infamous Letter than he will be able to make atonement in his whole life", and Oliver Ellsworth, a convention delegate from Connecticut, charged him with deliberately courting the Shays faction.

One consequence of the furor over his letter was that he was not selected as a delegate to the Massachusetts ratifying convention, although he was later invited to attend by the convention's leadership. The convention leadership was dominated by Federalists, and Gerry was not given any formal opportunity to speak. He left the convention after a shouting match with convention chair Francis Dana.Massachusetts ratified the constitution by a vote of 187 to 168. The debate had the result of estranging Gerry from several previously-friendly politicians, including chairman Dana and Rufus King.

=== U.S. House of Representatives ===
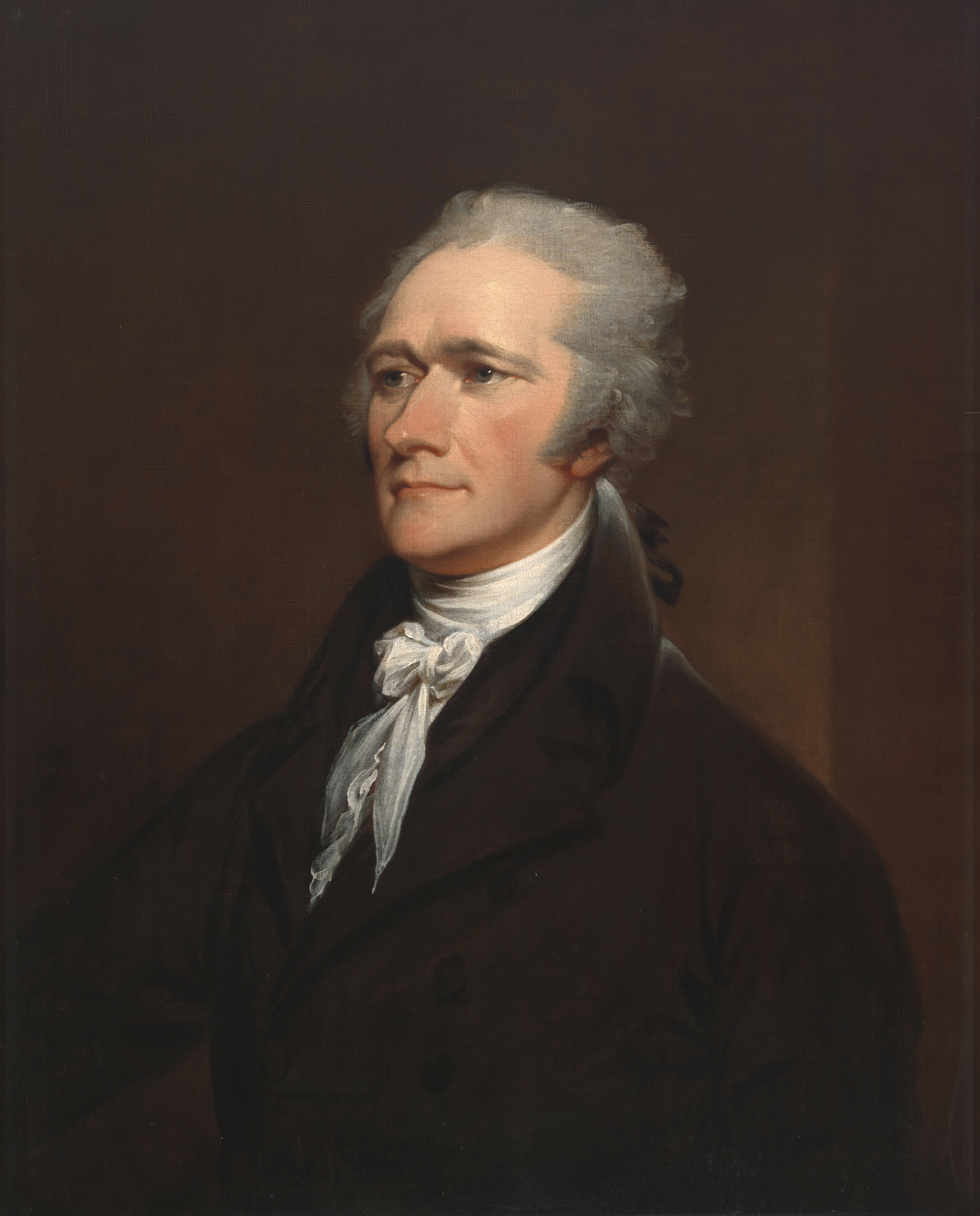
Gerry supported the federalist economic policies of Alexander Hamilton

Anti-Federalist forces nominated Gerry for governor in 1788, but he was predictably defeated by the popular incumbent John Hancock. Following its ratification, Gerry recanted his opposition to the Constitution, noting that other state ratifying conventions had called for amendments that he supported. He was nominated by friends (over his own opposition to the idea) for a seat in the inaugural House of Representatives, where he served two terms.

In June 1789, Gerry proposed that Congress consider all of the proposed constitutional amendments for which various state ratifying conventions had called (notably those of Rhode Island and North Carolina, which had at the time still not ratified the Constitution). In the debate that followed, he led opposition to some of the proposals, arguing that they did not go far enough in ensuring individual liberties. He successfully lobbied for inclusion of freedom of assembly in the First Amendment and was a leading architect of the Fourth Amendment protections against search and seizure. He sought unsuccessfully to insert the word "expressly" into the Tenth Amendment, which might have more significantly limited the federal government's power.

He was successful in efforts to severely limit the federal government's ability to control state militias. In tandem with this protection, he had once argued against the idea of the federal government controlling a large standing army, saying, "A standing army is like a standing member. It's an excellent assurance of domestic tranquility, but a dangerous temptation to foreign adventure."

Gerry vigorously supported Alexander Hamilton's reports on public credit, including the assumption at full value of state debts, and supported Hamilton's Bank of the United States, positions consistent with earlier calls he had made for economic centralization. Although he had speculated in depreciated Continental bills of credit (the IOUs at issue), no evidence shows he participated in large-scale speculation that attended the debate when it took place in 1790, and he became a major investor in the new bank. He used the floor of the House to speak out against aristocratic and monarchical tendencies he saw as threats to republican ideals, and generally opposed laws and their provisions that he perceived as limiting individual and state liberties. He opposed any attempt to give officers of the executive significant powers, specifically opposing establishment of the Treasury Department because its head might gain more power than the president. He opposed measures that strengthened the presidency, such as the ability to fire Cabinet officers, seeking instead to give the legislature more power over appointments.

Gerry did not stand for re-election in 1792, returning home to raise his children and care for his sickly wife. He agreed to serve as a presidential elector for John Adams in the 1796 election.

During Adams' term in office, Gerry maintained good relations with both Adams and Vice President Thomas Jefferson, hoping that the divided executive might lead to less friction. His hopes were not realized: the split between Federalists (Adams) and Democratic-Republicans (Jefferson) widened.

== XYZ Affair ==
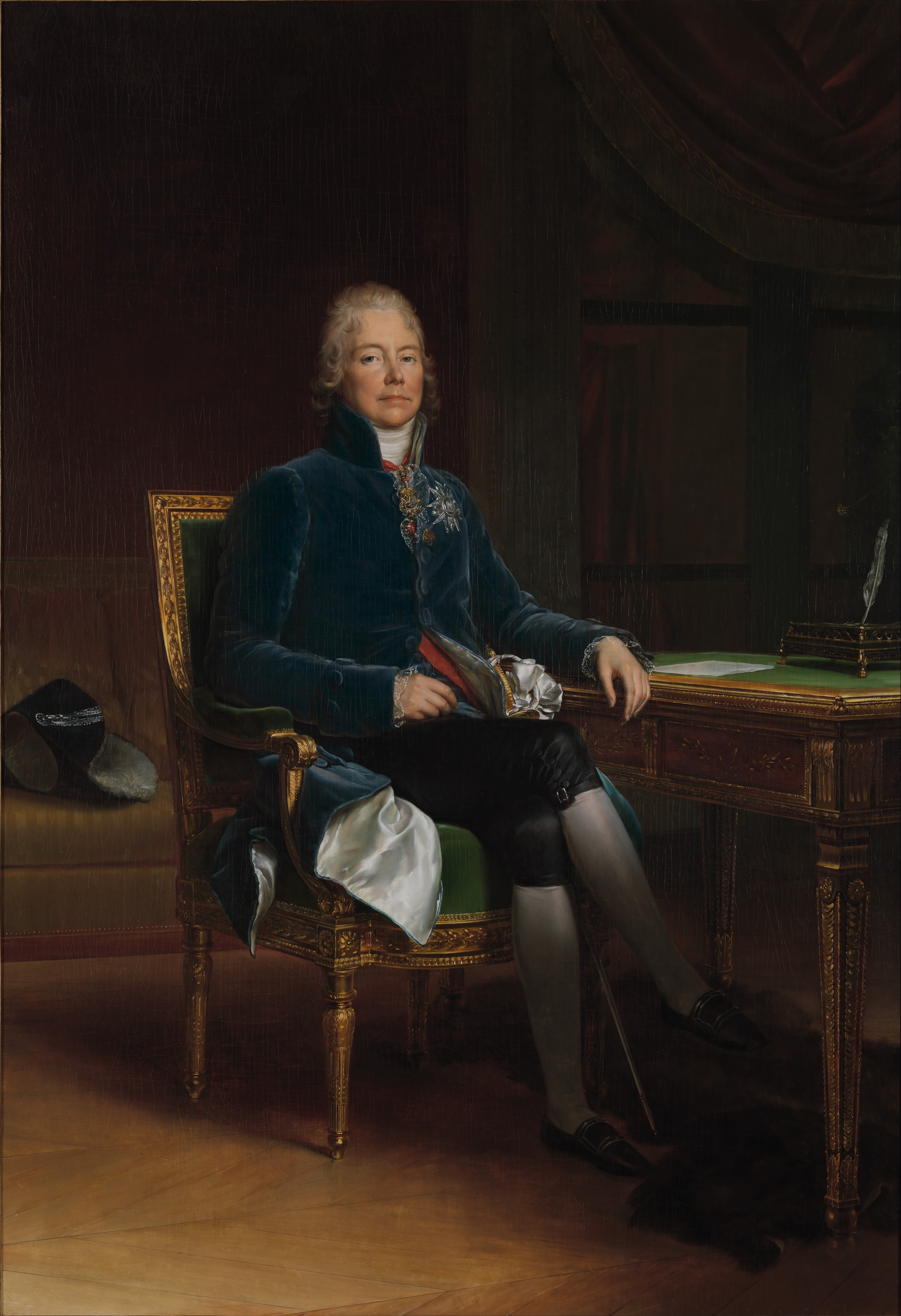
Charles Maurice de Talleyrand, depicted in this 1808 portrait by François Gérard, insisted Gerry remain in Paris even after negotiations failed.

President Adams appointed Gerry to be a member of a special diplomatic commission sent to Republican France in 1797. Tensions had risen between the two nations after the 1796 ratification of the Jay Treaty, made between the United States and Great Britain. It was seen by French leaders as signs of an Anglo-American alliance, and France had consequently stepped up seizures of American ships. Adams chose Gerry over his cabinet's opposition (on political grounds that Gerry was insufficiently Federalist), because of their long-standing relationship; Adams described Gerry as one of the "two most impartial men in America" (Adams himself being the other).

Gerry joined co-commissioners Charles Cotesworth Pinckney and John Marshall in France in October 1797 and met briefly with Foreign Minister Talleyrand. Some days after that meeting, the delegation was approached by three French agents (at first identified as "X", "Y", and "Z" in published papers, leading the controversy to be called the "XYZ Affair"), who demanded substantial bribes from the commissioners before negotiations could continue. The commissioners refused and sought unsuccessfully to engage Talleyrand in formal negotiations. Believing Gerry to be the most approachable of the commissioners, Talleyrand successively froze first Pinckney and then Marshall out of the informal negotiations, and they left France in April 1798. Gerry, who sought to leave with them, stayed behind because Talleyrand threatened war if he left. Gerry refused to make any significant negotiations afterward and left Paris in August.

By then, dispatches describing the commission's reception had been published in the United States, raising calls for war. The undeclared naval Quasi-War (1798–1800) followed. Federalists, notably Secretary of State Timothy Pickering, accused Gerry of supporting the French and abetting the breakdown of the talks, while Adams and Democratic-Republicans such as Thomas Jefferson supported him. The negative press damaged Gerry's reputation, and he was burned in effigy by protestors in front of his home. He was only later vindicated, when his correspondence with Talleyrand was published in 1799. In response to the Federalist attacks on him, and because of his perception that the Federalist-led military buildup threatened republican values, Gerry formally joined the Democratic-Republican Party in early 1800, standing for election as governor of Massachusetts.

== Governor of Massachusetts ==
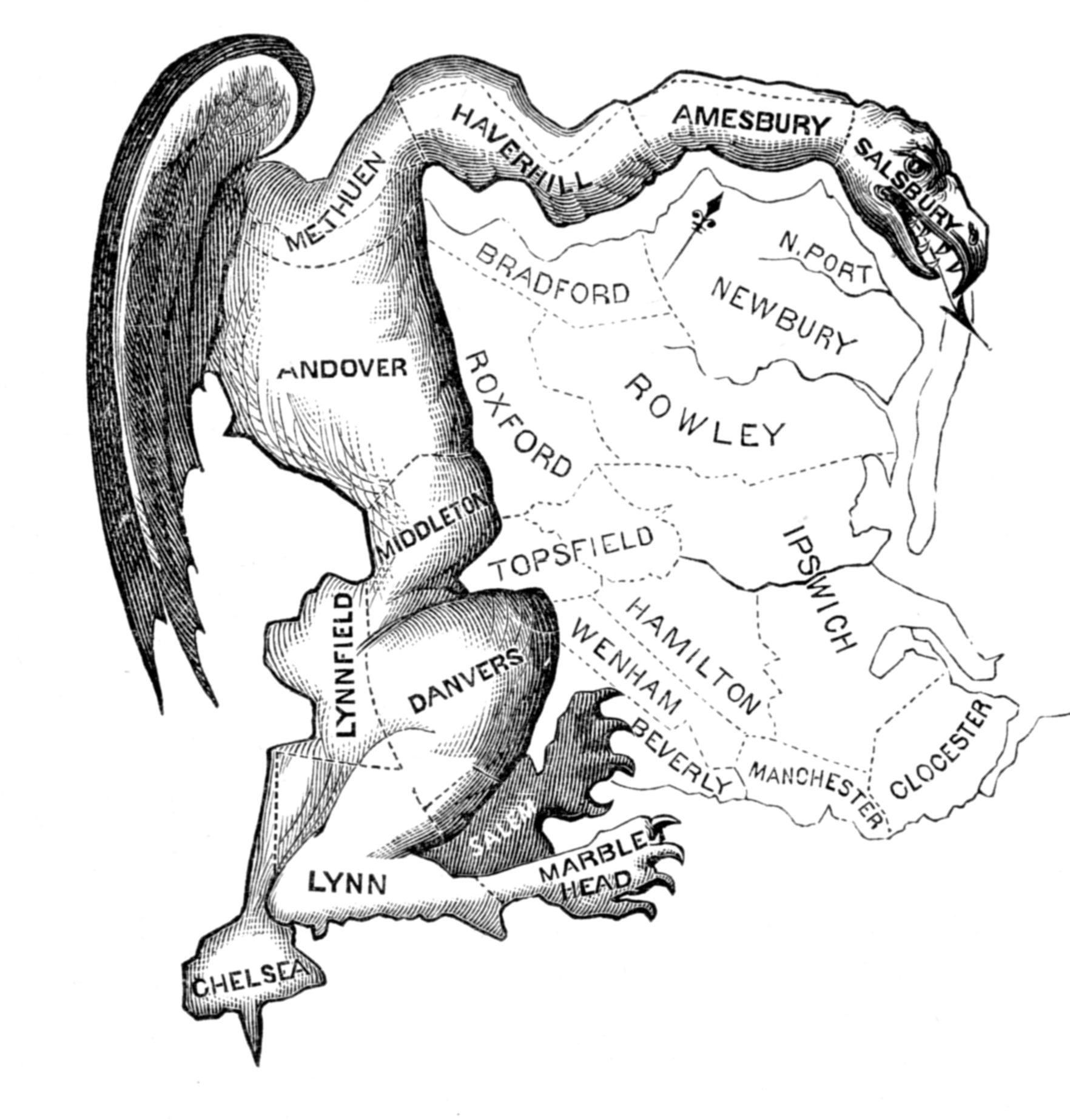
The word "gerrymander", originally written as "Gerry-mander", was used for the first time in the Boston Gazette on March 26, 1812. Appearing with the term, and helping spread and sustain its popularity, was this political cartoon, which depicts a state senate district in Essex County, Massachusetts, as a strange animal with claws, wings, and a dragon-type head, satirizing the district's odd shape.

For years (in the 1800, 1801, 1802, and 1803 elections), Gerry unsuccessfully sought the governorship of Massachusetts. His opponent in these races, Caleb Strong, was a popular moderate Federalist, whose party dominated the state's politics despite a national shift toward the Democratic-Republicans. In 1803, Democratic-Republicans in the state were divided, and Gerry only had regional support of the party. He decided not to run in the 1804 election, returning to semi-retirement and to deal with a personal financial crisis. His brother Samuel Russell had mismanaged his own business affairs, and Gerry had propped him up by guaranteeing a loan that was due. The matter ultimately ruined Gerry's finances for his remaining years.

Democratic-Republican James Sullivan won the governor's seat from Strong in the 1807 election, but his successor was unable to hold the seat in the 1809 election, which went to Federalist Christopher Gore. Gerry stood for election again in the 1810 election against Gore and won a narrow victory. Democratic-Republicans cast Gore as an ostentatious British-loving Tory, who wanted to restore the monarchy (his parents were Loyalists during the Revolution), and Gerry as a patriotic American, while Federalists described Gerry as a "French partisan" and Gore as an honest man devoted to ridding the government of foreign influence. A temporary lessening in the threat of war with Britain aided Gerry. The two battled again in 1811, with Gerry once again victorious in a highly acrimonious campaign.

Gerry's first year as governor was less controversial than his second, because the Federalists controlled the state senate. He preached moderation in the political discourse, noting that it was important that the nation present a unified front in its dealings with foreign powers. In his second term, with full Democratic-Republican control of the legislature, he became notably more partisan, purging much of the state government of Federalist appointees. The legislature also enacted "reforms" of the court system that resulted in an increase in the number of judicial appointments, which Gerry filled with Democratic-Republican partisans. However, infighting within the party and a shortage of qualified candidates played against Gerry, and the Federalists scored points by complaining vocally about the partisan nature of the reforms.

Other legislation passed during Gerry's second year included a bill broadening the membership of Harvard's Board of Overseers to diversify its religious membership, and another that liberalized religious taxes. The Harvard bill had significant political slant because the recent split between orthodox Congregationalists and Unitarians also divided the state to some extent along party lines, and Federalist Unitarians had recently gained control over the Harvard board.

In 1812, the state adopted new constitutionally mandated electoral district boundaries. The Democratic-Republican-controlled legislature had created district boundaries designed to enhance their party's control over state and national offices, leading to some oddly shaped legislative districts. Although Gerry was unhappy about the highly partisan districting (according to his son-in-law, he thought it "highly disagreeable"), he signed the legislation. The shape of one of the state senate districts in Essex County was compared to a salamander by a local Federalist newspaper in a political cartoon, calling it a "Gerry-mander". Ever since, the creation of such districts has been called gerrymandering. (Note: "Gerrymandering" is a process by which electoral districts are drawn with the aim of aiding the party in power, although the pronunciation of the initial "g" has softened to /dʒ/ rather than the hard /ɡ/ of his name.)

Gerry also engaged in partisan investigations of potential libel against him by elements of the Federalist press, further damaging his popularity with moderates. The redistricting controversy, along with the libel investigation and the impending War of 1812, contributed to Gerry's defeat in 1812 (once again at the hands of Caleb Strong, whom the Federalists had brought out of retirement). The gerrymandering of the state Senate was a notable success in the 1812 election: the body was thoroughly dominated by Democratic-Republicans, even though the house and the governor's seat went to Federalists by substantial margins.

== Vice presidency (1813-1814) ==
Gerry's financial difficulties prompted him to ask President James Madison for a federal position after his loss in the 1812 election held earlier in the year. He was chosen by the Democratic-Republican Party's congressional caucus of the to be Madison's vice presidential running mate in the 1812 presidential election, although the nomination was first offered to John Langdon. He was viewed as a relatively safe choice who would attract Northern votes, but not pose a threat to James Monroe, who was thought likely to succeed Madison. Madison narrowly won reelection.

Gerry took the oath of office at Elmwood in March 1813. During this time, the office of vice president was largely a sinecure. Gerry's duties included advancing the administration's agenda in Congress and dispensing patronage positions in New England. Gerry's actions in support of the War of 1812 had a partisan edge; he expressed concerns over a possible Federalist seizure of Fort Adams (as Boston's Fort Independence was then known) as a prelude to Anglo-Federalist cooperation and sought the arrest of printers of Federalist newspapers.

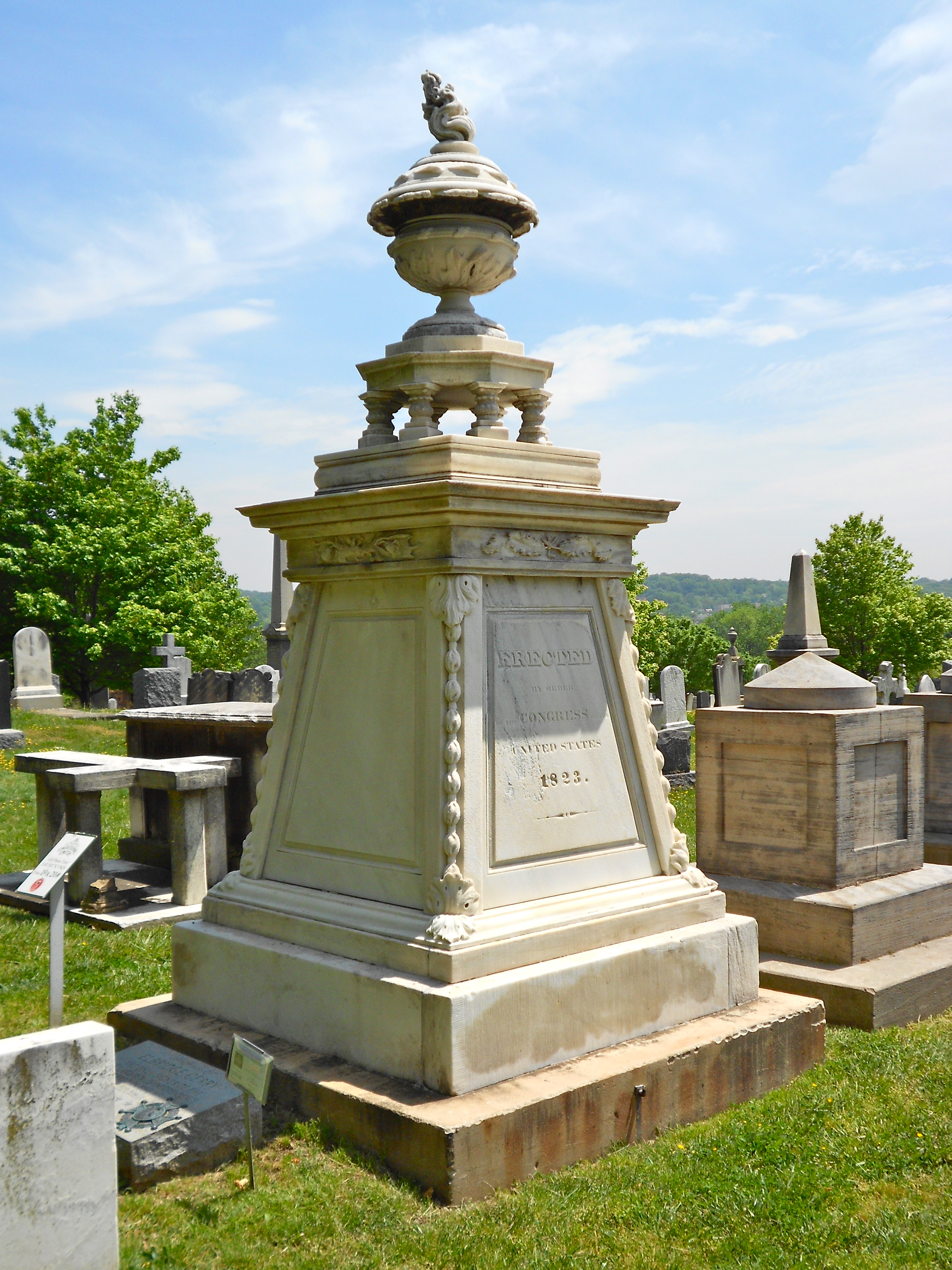
Gerry's grave in Congressional Cemetery in Washington, D.C.

=== Death ===
On November 23, 1814, Gerry suffered a heart attack while visiting Joseph Nourse of the Treasury Department, and he died soon after returning to his home in the Seven Buildings. He was 70 years old. Gerry became the second vice president in a row to die in office, after George Clinton.

He is buried in the Congressional Cemetery in Washington, DC, with a memorial by John Frazee. He is the only signer of the Declaration of Independence who was buried in the nation's capital city. The estate he left his wife and children was rich in land and poor in cash, but he had managed to repay his brother's debts with his pay as vice president. Aged 68 at the start of his vice presidency, he was the oldest person to become vice president until Charles Curtis in 1929.

== Legacy ==
Gerry is generally remembered for the use of his name in the word gerrymander, for his refusal to sign the United States Constitution, and for his role in the XYZ Affair and for his time as vice president. His path through the politics of the age has been difficult to characterize. Early biographers, including his son-in-law James T. Austin and Samuel Eliot Morison, struggled to explain his apparent changes in position. Biographer George Athan Billias posits that Gerry was a consistent advocate and practitioner of republicanism as it was originally envisioned, and that his role in the Constitutional Convention had a significant impact on the document it eventually produced.

Gerry had 10 children, 9 of whom survived into adulthood:

1. Catharine Gerry (1787–1850)
2. Eliza Gerry (1791–1882)
3. Ann Gerry (1791–1883)
4. Elbridge Gerry, Jr. (1793–1867)
5. Thomas Russell Gerry (1794–1848), who married Hannah Green Goelet (1804–1845)
6. Helen Maria Gerry (1796–1864)
7. James Thompson Gerry (1797–1854), who left West Point upon his father's death and was commander of the war-sloop USS Albany; the sloop disappeared with all hands September 28 or 29, 1854, near the West Indies.
8. Eleanor Stanford Gerry (1800–1871)
9. Emily Louisa Gerry (1802–1894)

Gerry's grandson, Elbridge Thomas Gerry, became a distinguished lawyer and philanthropist in New York. His great-grandson, Peter G. Gerry, was a member of the U.S. House of Representatives and later a U.S. Senator from Rhode Island.

Gerry is depicted in two of John Trumbull's paintings, the Declaration of Independence and General George Washington Resigning His Commission. Both are on view in the rotunda of the United States Capitol.

The upstate New York town of Elbridge is believed to have been named in his honor, as is the western New York town of Gerry. The town of Phillipston, Massachusetts, was originally incorporated in 1786 under the name Gerry in his honor, but was changed to its present name after the town submitted a petition in 1812, citing Democratic-Republican support for the War of 1812.

Gerry's Landing Road in Cambridge, Massachusetts, is located near the Eliot Bridge not far from Elmwood. During the 19th century, the area was known as Gerry's Landing (formerly known as Sir Richard's Landing) and was used by a Gerry relative for a short time as a landing and storehouse. The supposed house of his birth, the Elbridge Gerry House (whether he was born in the house currently standing on the site or an earlier structure is uncertain) stands in Marblehead, and Marblehead's Elbridge Gerry School is named in his honor.

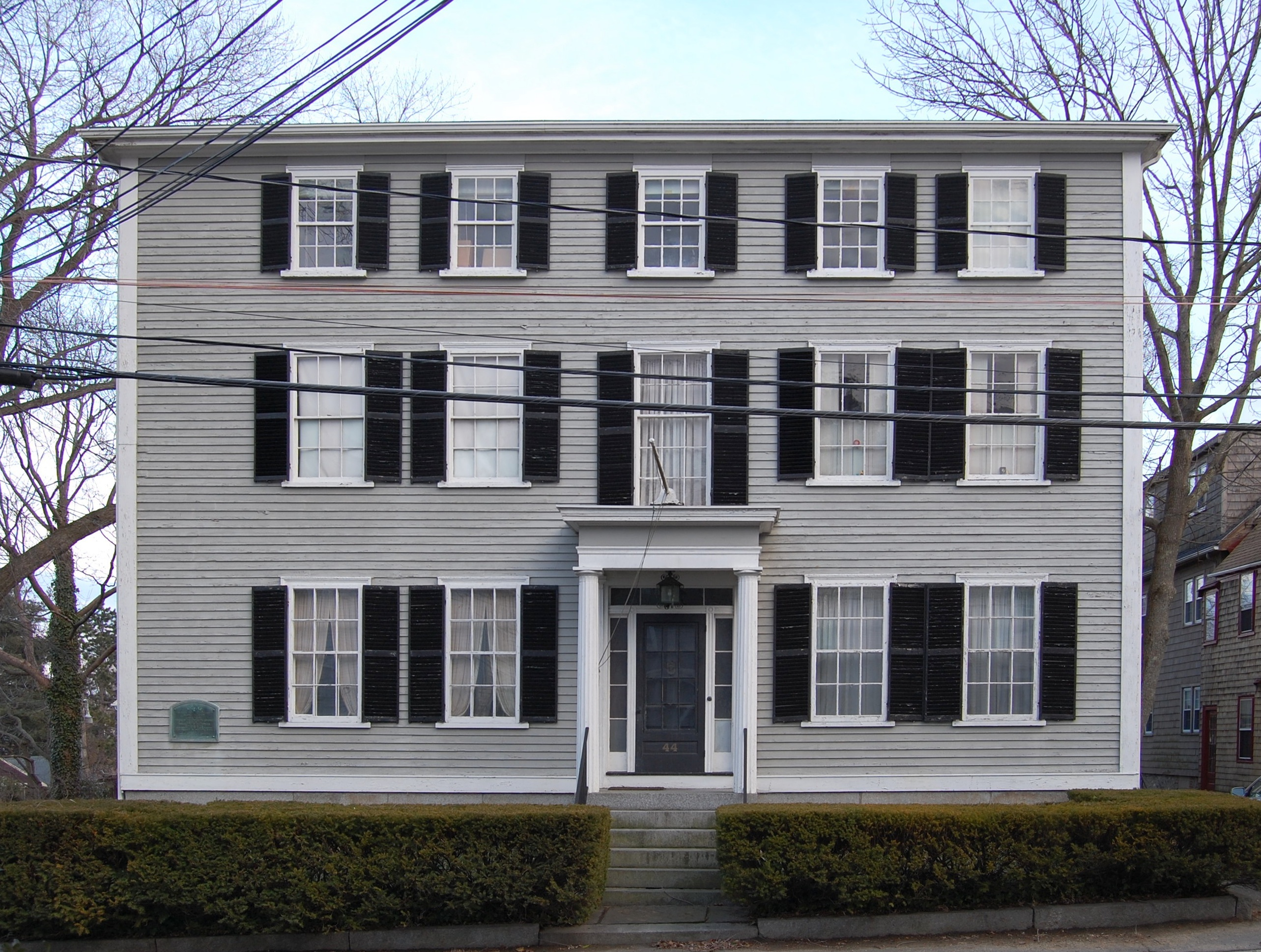
The Elbridge Gerry House in Marblehead, Massachusetts

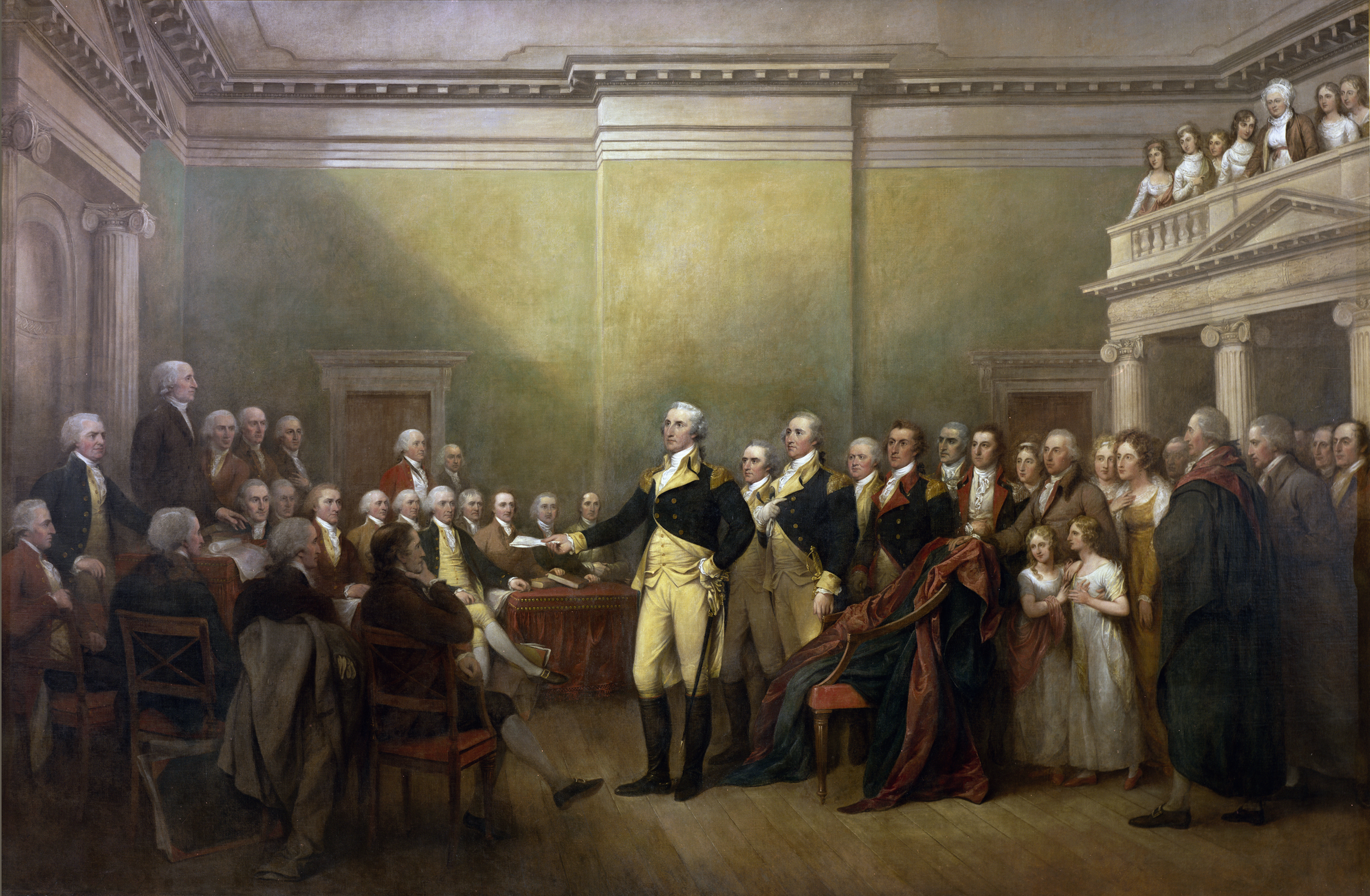
General George Washington Resigning His Commission, a portrait by John Trumbull depicting Gerry standing on the left

== See also ==
- Memorial to the 56 Signers of the Declaration of Independence

== Bibliography ==
- Ammon, Harry (1990) [1971]. James Monroe: The Quest for National Identity. Charlottesville: University of Virginia Press. ISBN 9780813912660. OCLC 20294950.
- Austin, James (1828–1829). Life of Elbridge Gerry. Boston: Wells and Lily. OCLC 3672336. Volume 2 Austin was Gerry's son-in-law.
- Bethell, John; Hunt, Richard; Shenton, Robert (2004). Harvard A to Z. Cambridge, MA: Harvard University Press. ISBN 9780674012882. OCLC 492735502.
- Beauchamp, William (1908). Past and Present of Syracuse and Onondaga County, Volume 1. New York: S. J. Clark. OCLC 3151469.
- Billias, George (1976). Elbridge Gerry, Founding Father and Republican Statesman. McGraw-Hill Publishers. ISBN 0-07-005269-7.
- Buel, Richard (2005). America on the Brink. New York: Palgrave Macmillan. ISBN 9781403962386. OCLC 55510543.
- Chisholm, Hugh, ed. (1911). "Gerry, Elbridge" . Encyclopædia Britannica. Vol. 11 (11th ed.). Cambridge University Press. pp. 903–904.
- Downs, John Phillips; Hedley, Frederick (1921). History of Chautauqua County and its People, Volume 1. Boston: American Historical Society. ISBN 9785872000877. OCLC 1215442.
- Elkins, Stanley; McKitrick, Eric (1993). The Age of Federalism. New York: Oxford University Press. ISBN 9780195068900. OCLC 26720733.
- Elster, Charles (2005). The Big Book of Beastly Mispronunciations. Boston: Houghton Mifflin. ISBN 9780618423156. OCLC 317828351.
- Ferling, John (1992). John Adams: A Life. Knoxville: University of Tennessee Press. ISBN 0870497308.
- Formisano, Ronald (1983). The Transformation of Political Culture: Massachusetts Parties, 1790s–1840s. New York: Oxford University Press. ISBN 9780195035094. OCLC 18429354.
- Gilje, Paul (1999). Rioting in America. Bloomington, IN: Indiana University Press. ISBN 9780253212627. OCLC 185656124.
- Greenleaf, James (1910). Genealogy of the Greenleaf Family. Boston: F. Wood. p. 77. OCLC 4652345.
- Griffith, Elmer (1907). The Rise and Development of the Gerrymander. Chicago: Scott, Foresman and Co. p. 73. OCLC 45790508.
- Hart, Albert Bushnell, ed. (1927). Commonwealth History of Massachusetts. New York: The States History Company. OCLC 1543273. (five volume history of Massachusetts until the early 20th century)
- Marvin, Abijah (1879). History of Worcester County, Volume 2. Boston: C. F. Jewett. p. 221. OCLC 1804192.
- Morison, Samuel Eliot (2006) [1913]. The Life and Letters of Harrison Gray Otis. Kessinger Publishing. hdl:10111/UIUCOCA:lifelettersofhar02moris. ISBN 9781428606494. OCLC 706649803.
- Purcell, L. Edward (2010). Vice Presidents: A Biographical Dictionary. New York: Facts on File. ISBN 9781438130712. OCLC 650307529.
- Roberts, Rebecca Boggs; Schmidt, Sandra K (2012). Historic Congressional Cemetery. Charleston, SC: Arcadia Publishing. ISBN 9780738592244. OCLC 769988285.
- Smith, Jean Edward (1996). John Marshall: Definer Of A Nation. New York: Henry, Holt & Company. ISBN 9780805055108. OCLC 248101402.
- Stinchcombe, William (October 1977). "The Diplomacy of the WXYZ Affair". William and Mary Quarterly. 34 (34:590–617): 590–617. doi:10.2307/2936184. JSTOR 2936184.
- Trees, Andy (2000). "Private Correspondence for the Public Good: Thomas Jefferson to Elbridge Gerry, 26 January 1799". The Virginia Magazine of History and Biography. 108 (3). Virginia Historical Society: 217–254. ISSN 0042-6636. JSTOR 4249849. Shows that Gerry ignored Jefferson's 1799 letter inviting him to switch parties.
- Weir, John (1901). John Trumbull: A Brief Sketch of his Life. New York: Charles Scribner's Sons. p. 67. OCLC 2103628.
- Political Register and Congressional Directory. Boston: Houghton, Osgood. 1878. p. 408. OCLC 1466601.
- Publications of the Cambridge Historical Society. Cambridge, MA: Cambridge Historical Society. 1920. OCLC 6177743.

U.S. House of Representatives
New constituency	Member of the US House of Representatives from Massachusetts's 3rd congressional district 1789–1793	Succeeded by Shearjashub Bourne; Peleg Coffin Jr.
Party political offices
New political party	Democratic-Republican nominee for Governor of Massachusetts; 1800, 1801, 1802, 1803	Succeeded by James Sullivan
Preceded by Levi Lincoln	Democratic-Republican nominee for Governor of Massachusetts; 1810, 1811, 1812	Succeeded by Joseph B. Varnum
Preceded by John Langdon; Withdrew	Democratic-Republican nominee for Vice President of the United States; 1812	Succeeded by Daniel D. Tompkins
Political offices
Preceded by Christopher Gore	Governor of Massachusetts; 1810–1812	Succeeded by Caleb Strong
Preceded by George Clinton	Vice President of the United States; 1813–1814	Succeeded by Daniel D. Tompkins
