= Milton Klein =

Milton Klein may refer to:

- Milton L. Klein (1910–2007), Canadian politician
- Milton M. Klein (1917–2004), American historian
- Milton Klein (engineer), (1924– ), American engineer
