= 1811 Massachusetts gubernatorial election =

- April 1, 1811
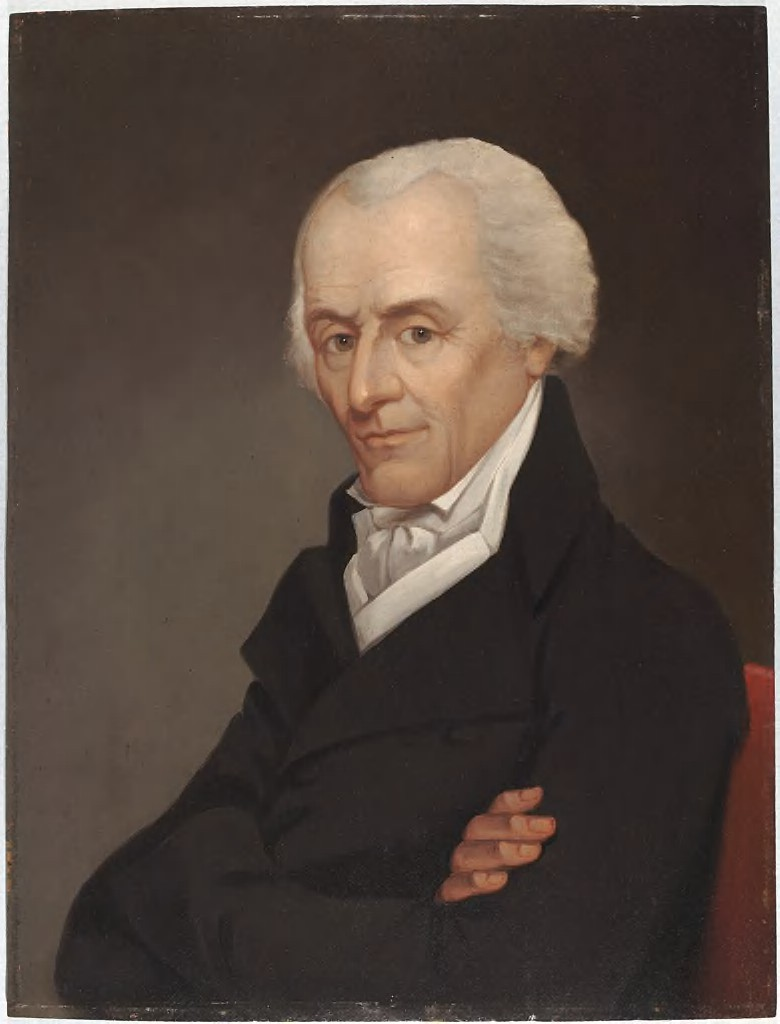

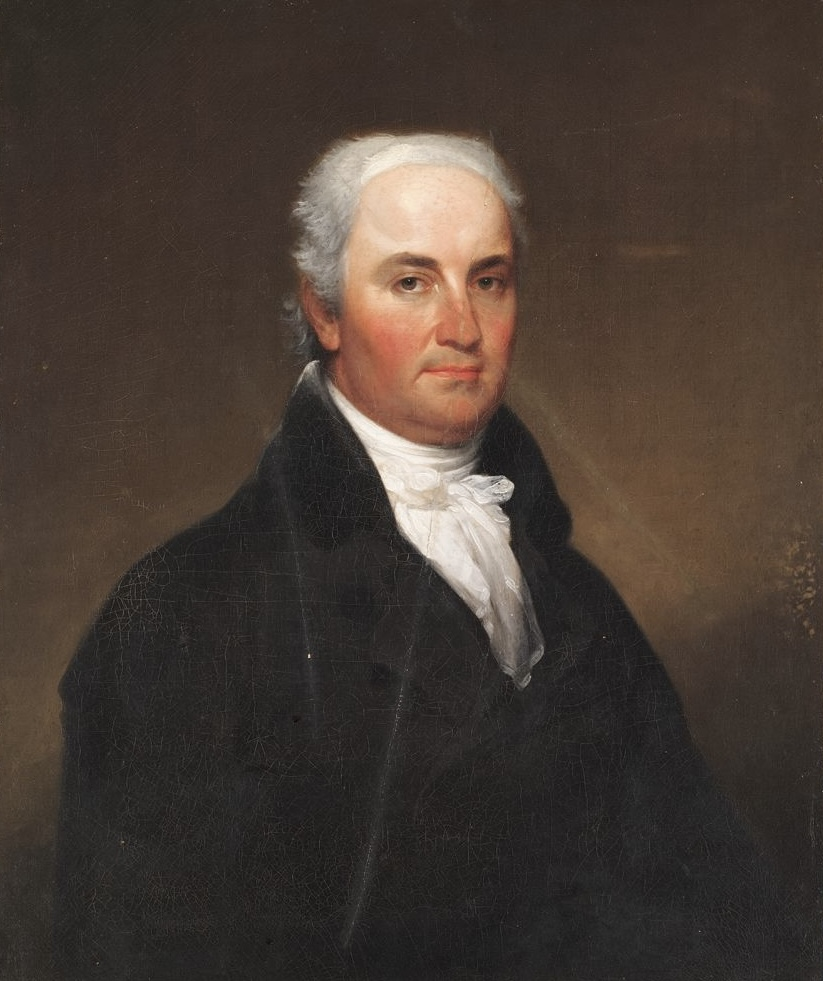
Nominee	Elbridge Gerry	Christopher Gore
Party	Democratic-Republican	Federalist
Popular vote	43,328	40,142
Percentage	51.63%	47.84%
- County results Gerry: 50–60% 60–70% Gore: 50–60% 60–70%
Governor before election
Elbridge Gerry
Democratic-Republican
Elected Governor
Elbridge Gerry
Democratic-Republican

The 1811 Massachusetts gubernatorial election was held on April 1, 1811.

Elbridge Gerry, the incumbent Democratic-Republican governor, was re-elected to a second term after defeating Federalist nominee Christopher Gore.

== General election ==
=== Candidates ===
- Elbridge Gerry, Democratic-Republican, incumbent Governor
- Christopher Gore, Federalist, former Governor

=== Results ===
1811 Massachusetts gubernatorial election
Party	Candidate	Votes	%	±%
Democratic-Republican	Elbridge Gerry (incumbent)	43,328	51.63%	
Federalist	Christopher Gore	40,142	47.84%	
Scattering		447	0.53%	
Majority		3,186	3.80%	
Turnout		83,917		
Democratic-Republican hold		Swing		
