= 1810 Massachusetts gubernatorial election =

- April 2, 1810
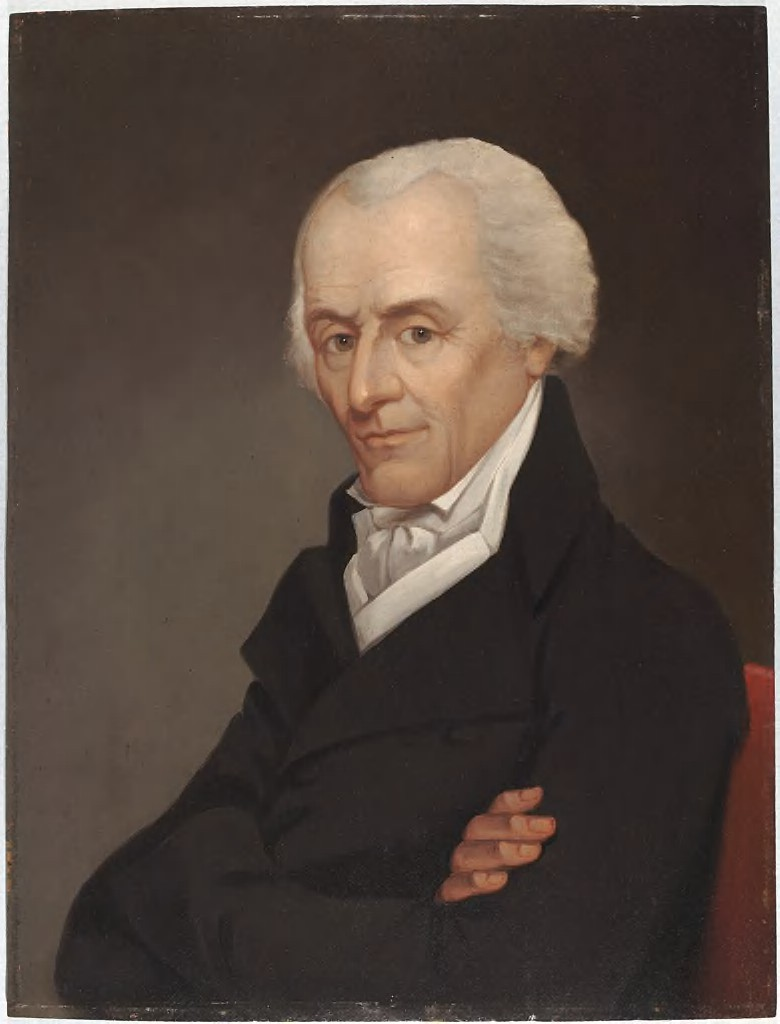

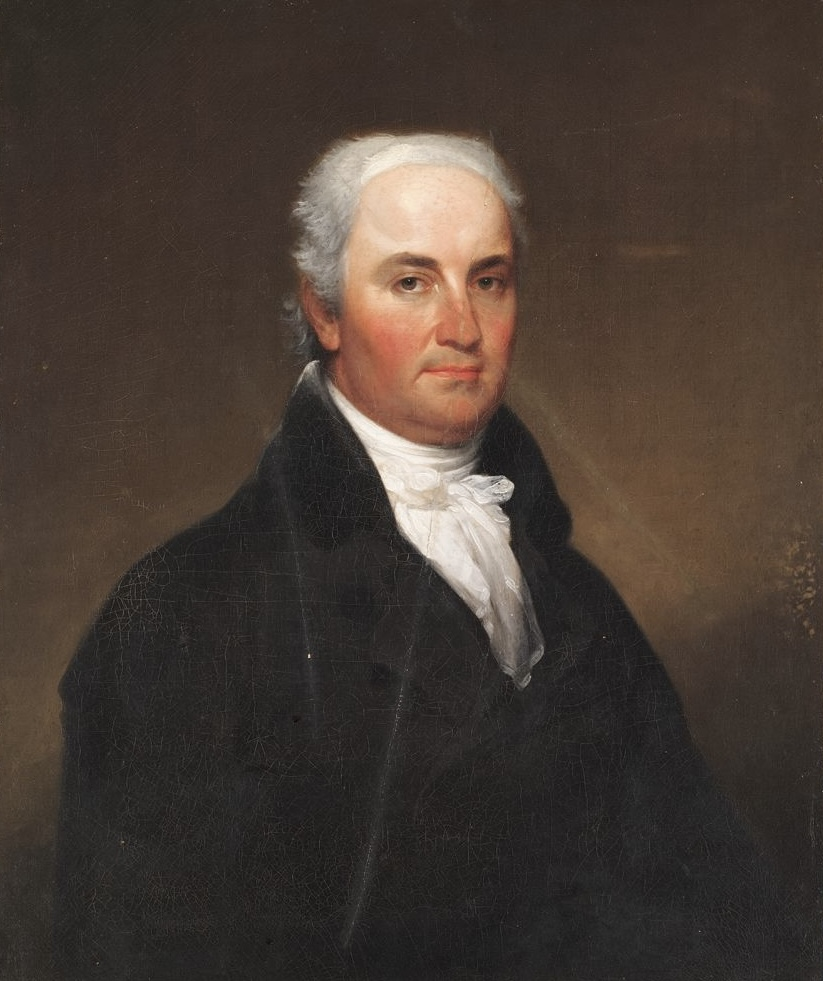
Nominee	Elbridge Gerry	Christopher Gore
Party	Democratic-Republican	Federalist
Popular vote	46,541	44,079
Percentage	51.25%	48.54%
- County results Gerry: 50–60% 60–70% 70–80% Gore: 50–60% 60–70%
Governor before election
Christopher Gore
Federalist
Elected Governor
Elbridge Gerry
Democratic-Republican

The 1810 Massachusetts gubernatorial election was held on April 2, 1810.

Incumbent Federalist Governor Christopher Gore was defeated by Democratic-Republican nominee Elbridge Gerry.

Republicans cast Gore as an ostentatious British-loving Tory who wanted to restore the monarchy (his parents were Loyalists during the Revolution), and Gerry as a patriotic American, while Federalists described Gerry as a "French partizan" and Gore as an honest man devoted to ridding the government of foreign influence. A temporary lessening in the threat of war with Britain aided Gerry.

== General election ==
=== Candidates ===
- Elbridge Gerry, Democratic-Republican, former U.S. Representative
- Christopher Gore, Federalist, incumbent Governor

=== Results ===
1810 Massachusetts gubernatorial election
Party	Candidate	Votes	%	±%
Democratic-Republican	Elbridge Gerry	46,541	51.25%	
Federalist	Christopher Gore (incumbent)	44,079	48.54%	
Scattering		193	0.21%	
Majority		2,462	2.71%	
Turnout		90,813		
Democratic-Republican gain from Federalist		Swing		

== Bibliography ==
- Billias, George (1976). Elbridge Gerry, Founding Father and Republican Statesman. McGraw-Hill Publishers. ISBN 0-07-005269-7.
- Buel, Richard (2005). America on the Brink. New York: Palgrave Macmillan. ISBN 9781403962386. OCLC 55510543.
