= 1803 Massachusetts gubernatorial election =

Gubernatorial Election held in Massachusetts in the year 1803

- April 4, 1803
- Turnout: 10.27% of population (▼1.46)
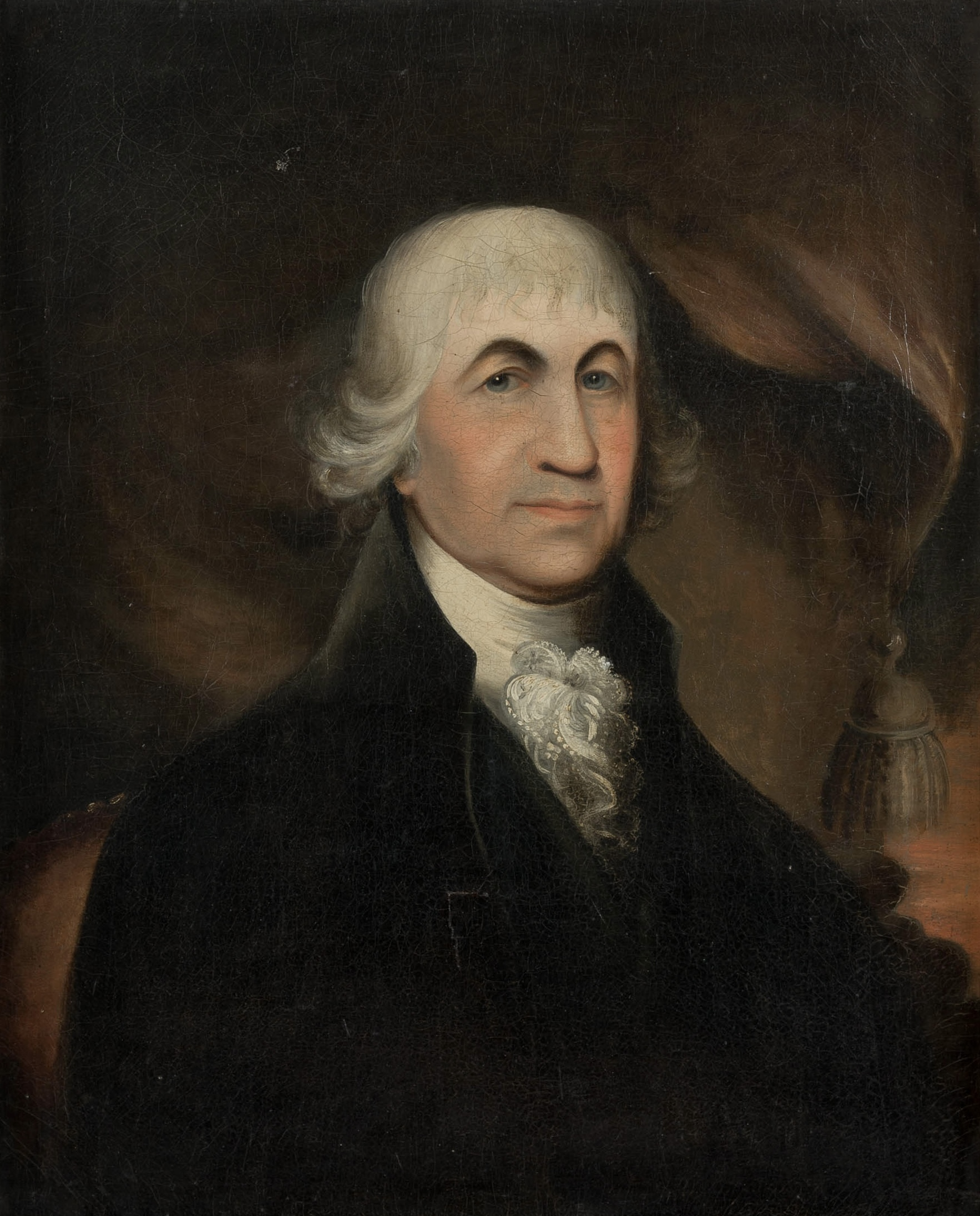

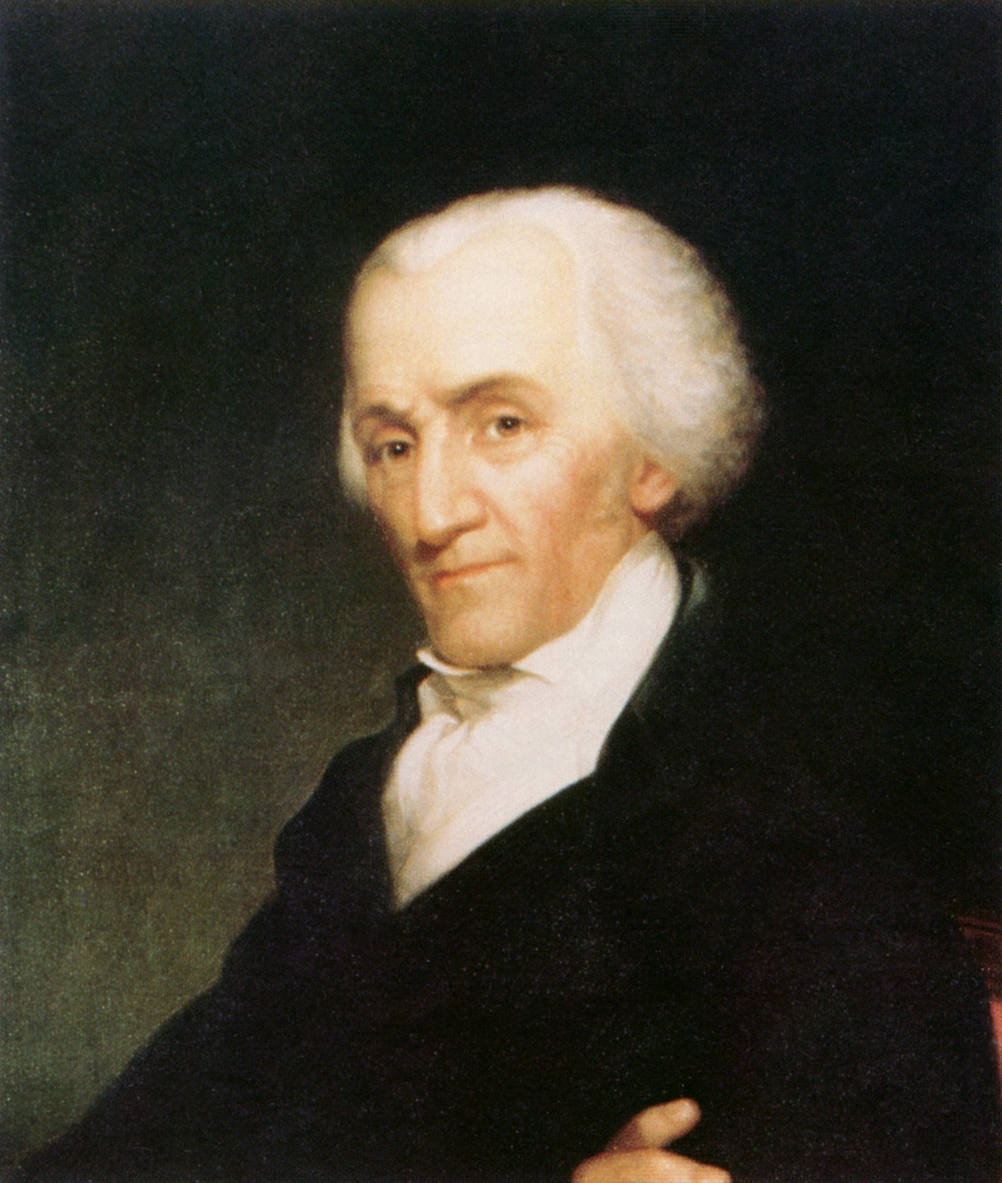
Nominee	Caleb Strong	Elbridge Gerry
Party	Federalist	Democratic-Republican
Popular vote	30,619	14,247
Percentage	67.79%	31.54%
- County results Strong: 50–60% 60–70% 70–80% 80–90% 90–100% Gerry: 50–60% 70–80%
Governor before election
Caleb Strong
Federalist
Elected Governor
Caleb Strong
Federalist

The 1803 Massachusetts gubernatorial election was held on April 4.

Federalist Governor Caleb Strong was re-elected to a fourth consecutive one-year term in office, defeating Democratic-Republican Elbridge Gerry again for the fourth time.

== General election ==
=== Results ===
1803 Massachusetts gubernatorial election
Party	Candidate	Votes	%	±%
Federalist	Caleb Strong (incumbent)	30,619	67.79%	
Democratic-Republican	Elbridge Gerry	14,247	31.54%	
Others	Scattering	300	0.66%	
Total votes		45,166	100.00%	
Federalist hold		Swing		
