= 1801 Massachusetts gubernatorial election =

- April 6, 1801
- Turnout: 10.84% of population (▲1.61)
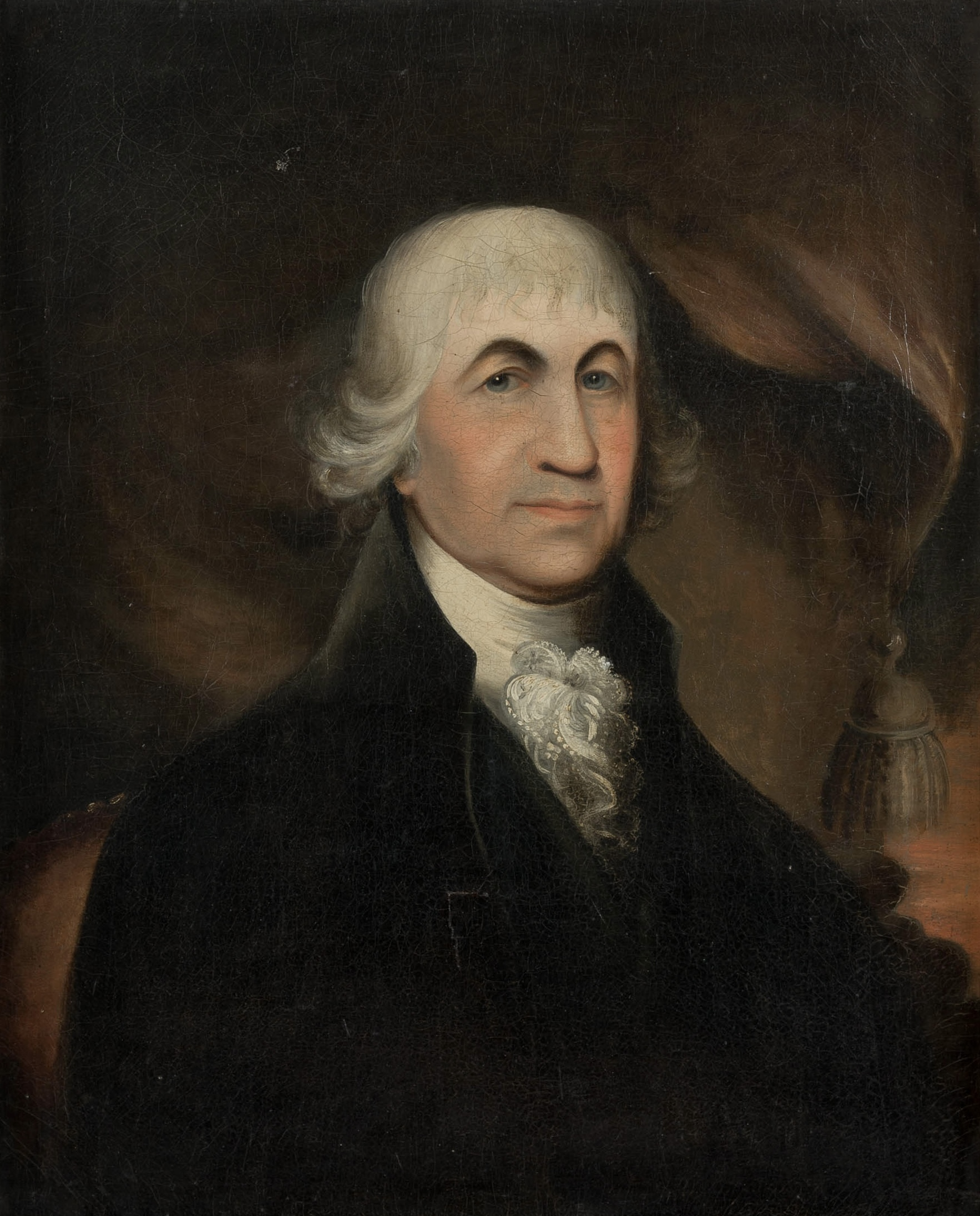

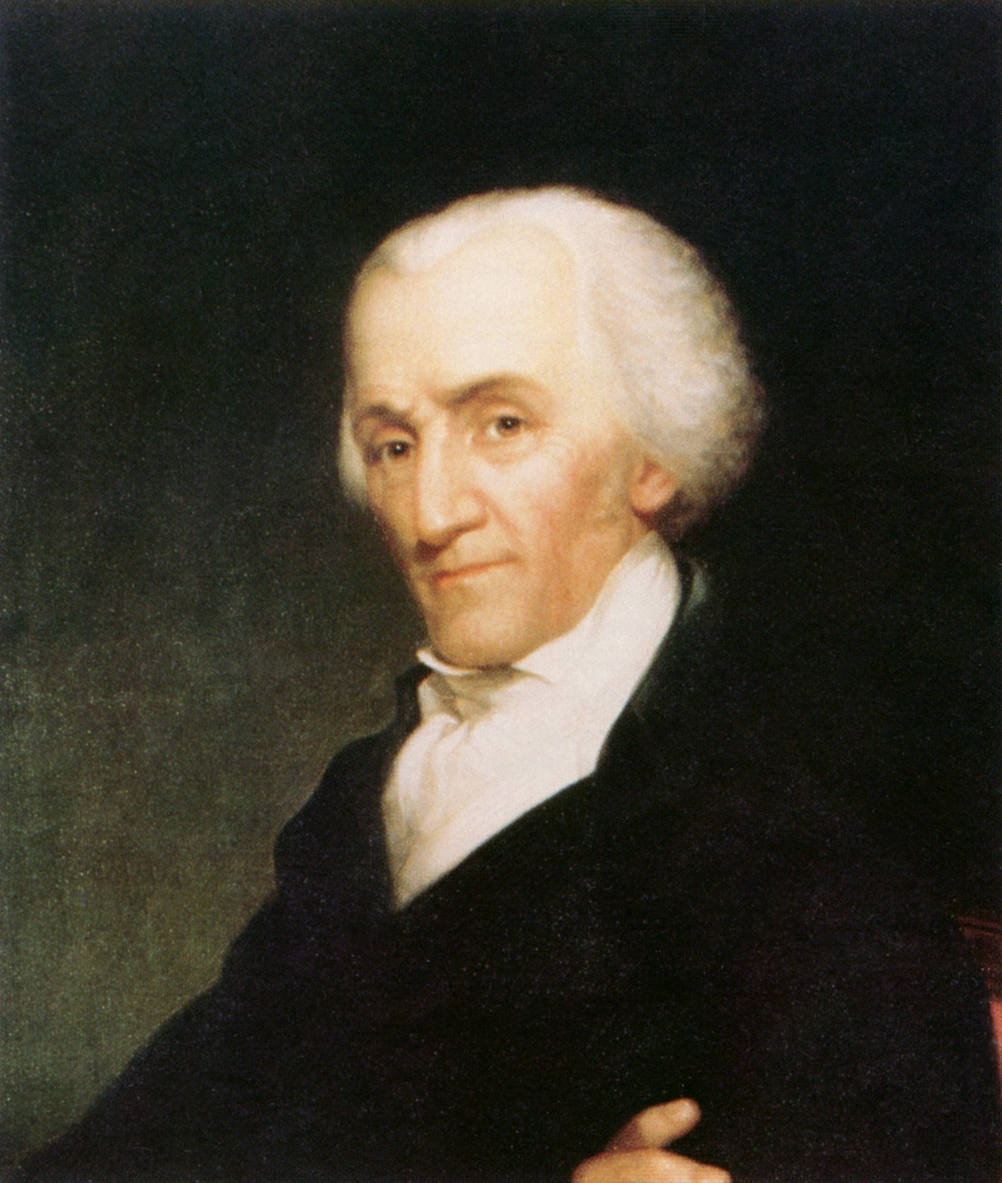
| Nominee | Caleb Strong | Elbridge Gerry |
| Party | Federalist | Democratic-Republican |
| Popular vote | 25,693 | 20,423 |
| Percentage | 55.50% | 44.11% |
- County results Strong: 50–60% 60–70% 70–80% 80–90% Gerry: 50–60% 60–70% 70–80%
Governor before election
Caleb Strong
Federalist
Elected Governor
Caleb Strong
Federalist

The 1801 Massachusetts gubernatorial election was held on April 6.

Federalist Governor Caleb Strong was re-elected to a second consecutive one-year term in office, defeating Democratic-Republican Elbridge Gerry.

== General election ==
=== Results ===
1801 Massachusetts gubernatorial election
| Party | Candidate | Votes | % | ±% |
|---|---|---|---|---|
| Federalist | Caleb Strong (incumbent) | 25,693 | 55.50% | |
| Democratic-Republican | Elbridge Gerry | 20,423 | 44.11% | |
| Others | Scattering | 180 | 0.39% | |
| Total votes | | 46,296 | 100.00% | |
| Federalist hold | | Swing | | |
