= George Athan Billias =

American historian (1919–2018)

- Born: June 26, 1919; Lynn, Massachusetts, U.S.
- Died: August 16, 2018 (aged 99); Worcester, Massachusetts, U.S.
- Education: Lynn English High School; Bates College (BA); Columbia University (PhD)
- Occupation: Historian

George Athan Billias (June 26, 1919 – August 16, 2018) was an American historian.

== Early life ==
Billias was born in Lynn, Massachusetts, and graduated from Lynn English High School in 1937. He received his B.A. from Bates College in 1948 and his Ph.D. from Columbia University in 1958. He joined the United States Army in 1941 and became a medical administrative officer in 1942. During World War II, he received the Bronze Star for gallantry in evacuating wounded from the Remagen bridgehead during the Battle for the Ludendorf Bridge across the Rhine River in March 1945. He served as a civilian National Defense Historian with the United States Air Force from 1951 to 1954 and was at the Eastern Air Defense Force in Stewart Air Force Base, Newburgh, New York.

== Career ==
Billias held the Jacob and Frances Hiatt Chair at Clark University from 1983 until his retirement in 1989. Following his retirement, he was awarded emeritus professor status. He has written several books, including George Washington's Generals And Opponents (1994) and General John Glover and His Marblehead Mariners (1960), as well as edited several collections including American Constitutionalism Abroad: Selected Essays in Comparative Constitutional History (1990). Billias also wrote Eldridge Gerry: Founding Father and Republican Statesman.

One of his early works was The Massachusetts Landbankers of 1740 published in 1959 by the University of Maine Press. He specialized in Colonial, Revolutionary War era, and Early National period America, with special emphasis on economic, military, legal, and constitutional subjects. Later, he focused on the influence of the American constitution on the world.

His book American Constitutionalism Around the World, 1776–1989 (New York University Press, 2009) won the New England Historical Association's 2010 book award.

Historian Gordon S. Wood stated at a 1989 symposium honoring Billias that also included Milton M. Klein, Drew McCoy, Isaac Kramnick, Lance Banning, and Peter S. Onuf:

In my opinion, George Billias epitomizes the working historian; he is the craftsman who represents the heart and soul of what we as a profession are about. He demonstrates why history is a discipline. He doesn't waste time wondering abstractly about truth and objectivity and musing about the possibilities of actually representing past reality. He just does history. Day in and day out he writes the books and articles that become the essential stuff of our cumulative effort to recover our past. Without the products of hardworking scholars like Billias, there would be no historical discipline and nothing of what we think of as history.

== Death ==
Billias died on August 16, 2018, at his home in Worcester, Massachusetts, at the age of 99.
