= Elbridge Gerry House =

Historic house in Massachusetts, United States

- U.S. National Register of Historic Places
- U.S. Historic district – Contributing property
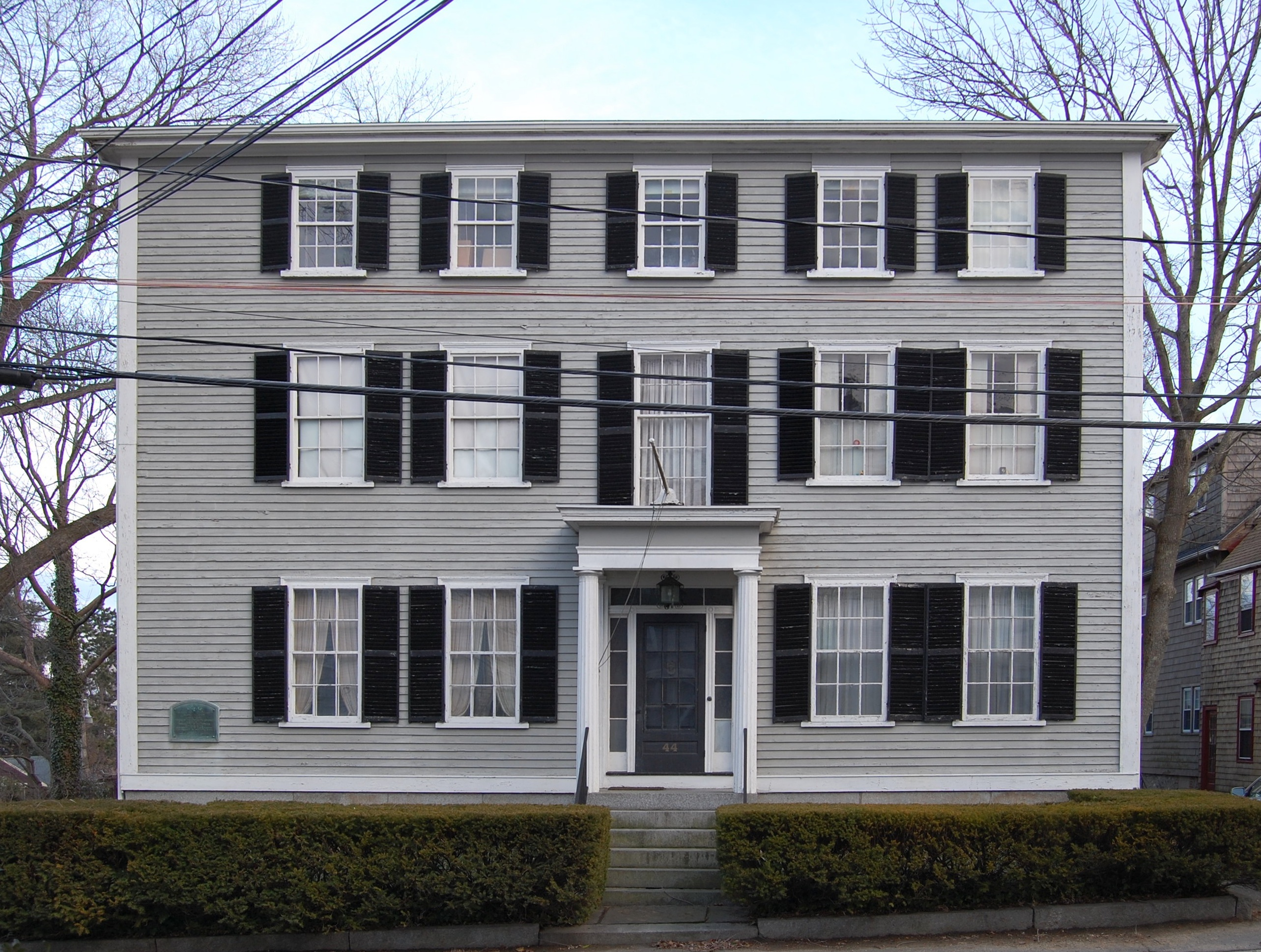
- Elbridge Gerry House at 44 Washington Street

- Location within Massachusetts Location within the United States
- Location: Marblehead, Massachusetts
- Coordinates: 42°30′24″N 70°50′53″W
- Built: 1730
- Architect: Gerry, Thomas
- Architectural style: Georgian
- Part of: Marblehead Historic District (ID84002402)
- NRHP reference No.: 73000304

Significant dates
- Added to NRHP: July 2, 1973
- Designated CP: January 10, 1984

The Elbridge Gerry House is a historic house at 44 Washington Street in Marblehead, Massachusetts. Local lore holds that this house is a c. 1730 house that was the home of merchant Thomas Gerry, and the place where statesman and Founding Father Elbridge Gerry was born in 1744. Stylistic analysis of the house, however, suggests that it is instead a late Georgian or early Federalist construction dating to c. 1790.

The house listed on the National Register of Historic Places in 1973, and included in the Marblehead Historic District in 1984.

== See also ==
- Elbridge Gerry Mansion, a chateau in Manhattan built in 1895 for Elbridge's grandson
- National Register of Historic Places listings in Essex County, Massachusetts
