= Caleb Strong =

American Founding Father and politician (1745–1819)

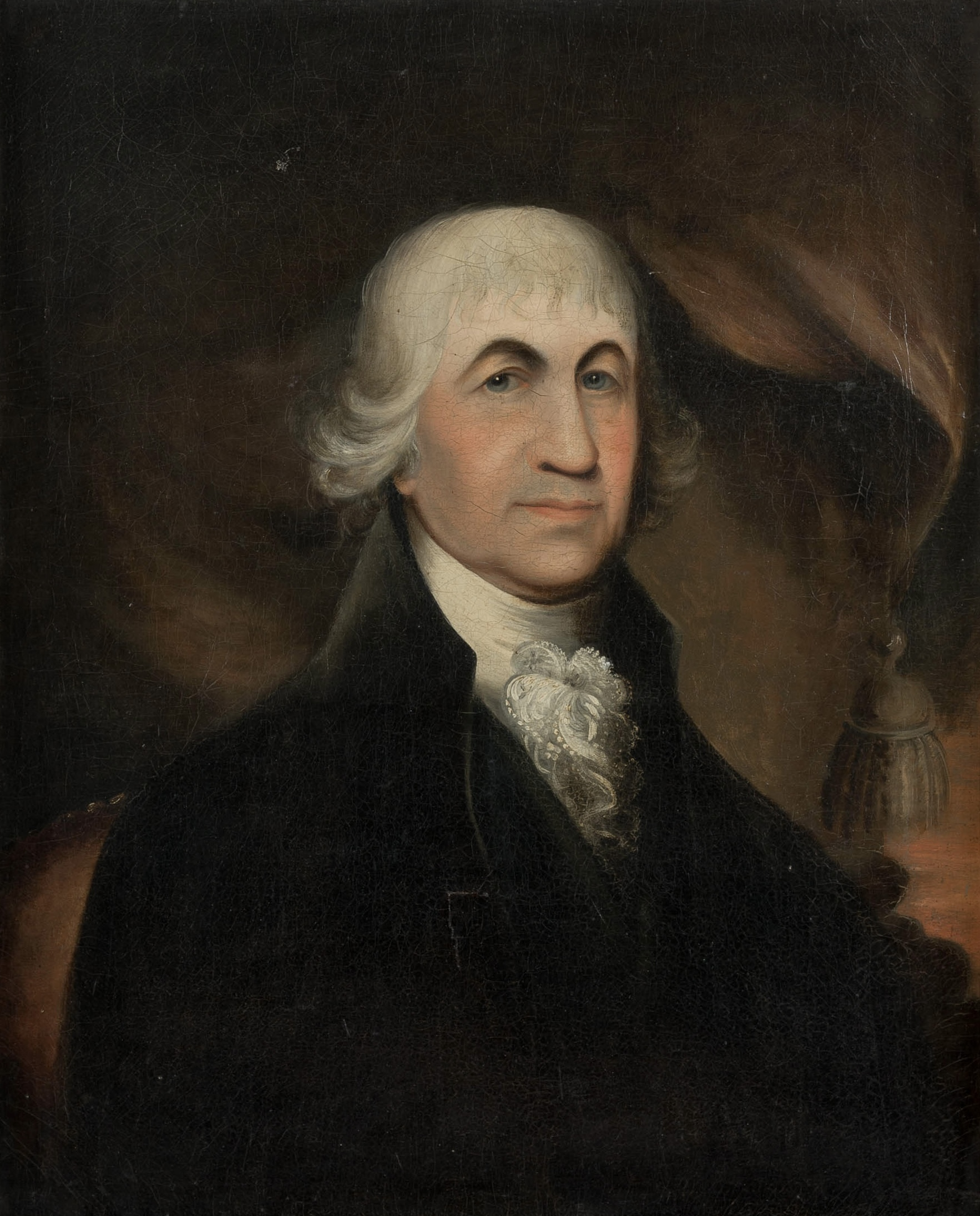
- Portrait, c. 1807

United States Senator from Massachusetts
- In office March 4, 1789 – June 1, 1796
- Preceded by: None
- Succeeded by: Theodore Sedgwick

6th and 10th Governor of Massachusetts
- In office June 5, 1812 – May 30, 1816
- Lieutenant: William Phillips Jr.
- Preceded by: Elbridge Gerry
- Succeeded by: John Brooks
- In office May 30, 1800 – May 29, 1807
- Lieutenant: Samuel Phillips Jr.; Edward Robbins
- Preceded by: Governor's Council (acting)
- Succeeded by: James Sullivan

Member of the Massachusetts Senate

Personal details
- Born: January 9, 1745 Northampton, Province of Massachusetts Bay, British America
- Died: November 7, 1819 (aged 74) Northampton, Massachusetts, U.S.
- Party: Pro-Administration; Federalist
- Education: Harvard College
- Profession: Lawyer, politician

Caleb Strong Jr. (January 9, 1745 – November 7, 1819) was an American lawyer, politician, and Founding Father who served as the sixth and tenth governor of Massachusetts between 1800 and 1807, and again from 1812 until 1816. He assisted in drafting the Massachusetts State Constitution in 1779 and served as a state senator and on the Massachusetts Governor's Council before being elected to the inaugural United States Senate. A leading member of the Massachusetts Federalist Party, his political success delayed the decline of the Federalists in Massachusetts.

A successful Northampton lawyer prior to 1774, Strong was politically active in the rebel cause during the American Revolutionary War. He played an influential role in the development of the United States Constitution at the 1787 Philadelphia Convention and, as a U.S. Senator, in the passage of its 11th Amendment. He also played a leading role in the passage of the Judiciary Act of 1789, which established the federal court system.

Adept at moderating the sometimes harsh political conflict between Federalists and Democratic-Republicans in Massachusetts, he navigated the state in a Federalist direction through the early years of the 19th century as the rest of the country became progressively more Republican. Although he sought to retire from politics after losing the 1807 governor's race, the advent of the War of 1812 brought him back to the governor's office as a committed opponent of the war. He refused United States Army requests that state militia be placed under army command and in 1814 sought to engage Nova Scotia Governor John Coape Sherbrooke in peace talks. The state and federal governments' weak defense of Massachusetts' northern frontier during Strong's tenure contributed to the successful drive for Maine's statehood, which was granted in 1820.

== Early years ==
Caleb Strong was born on January 9, 1745, in Northampton, one of the principal towns of Hampshire County on the Connecticut River in the Province of Massachusetts Bay. His parents were Phebe Lyman Strong and Caleb Strong, the latter a descendant of early Massachusetts settlers such as John Strong, a 1630 immigrant to Massachusetts who was one of the founders of Northampton and the lead elder of the church for many years. Caleb was their only son. He received his early education from Rev. Samuel Moody and entered Harvard College in 1760, graduating four years later with high honors. He was shortly thereafter afflicted with smallpox, which temporarily blinded him and prevented him from engaging in the study of law for several years. He studied law with Joseph Hawley, was admitted to the bar in 1772, and began the practice of law in Northampton. Hawley was also a political mentor, shaping Strong's views on relations between the Colonies and Great Britain.

== American Revolution ==
Strong and Hawley were both elected to the Massachusetts Provincial Congress in 1774. When the Revolutionary War broke out in 1775, Strong was unable to serve in the military because of his damaged sight, but he was otherwise active in the Patriot cause. He served on the Northampton Committee of Safety and in other local offices but refused service in the Continental Congress. He was a delegate to the 1779 Massachusetts Constitutional Convention and was elected to the committee that drafted the state constitution, ratified in 1780. He then served on the first governor's council and in the state senate from 1780 to 1789.

Strong's legal practice thrived during the tumultuous war years and was one of the most successful in Hampshire County. He became a judge of the Court of Common Pleas in 1775 and was appointed county attorney of Hampshire County the following year, a post he held until 1800. On more than one occasion he was offered a seat on the state's supreme court but rejected the position on account of its inadequate salary. Strong was described by a contemporary as meticulously detailed in his preparation of legal paperwork and a persuasive advocate when speaking to a jury.

In 1781 Strong was one of the lawyers (another was Worcester lawyer and future United States Attorney General Levi Lincoln Sr.) who worked on a series of legal cases surrounding Quock Walker, a former slave seeking to claim his freedom. One of the cases, Commonwealth of Massachusetts v. Nathaniel Jennison, firmly established that slavery was incompatible with the new state constitution.

== Philadelphia Convention and United States Senator ==
Strong was elected as a delegate to the Philadelphia Convention that drafted the 1787 Constitution. A committed Federalist, Strong opposed the idea of the Electoral College as a means of electing the president, instead supporting the idea that the legislature should choose him. Although he initially opposed proposals that the number of senators should be equal for all states, he eventually changed his mind, enabling passage of the Connecticut Compromise. To temper the power of the states, he introduced language requiring tax legislation to originate in the House of Representatives. Illness of his wife forced him to return to Massachusetts before the work was completed, so he did not sign the document. He was a vocal supporter of its adoption by the state's ratifying convention.

When the Constitution came into force in 1789, Strong was chosen by the state legislature to serve in the United States Senate. As what is now known as a Class 2 Senator he came up for reelection in 1792, when he was again chosen. He was one of the principal drafters of the Judiciary Act of 1789, which established the federal courts. He was also instrumental in 1793 and 1794 in the development and passage by Congress of the 11th Amendment to the United States Constitution. This measure was enacted in response to Chisholm v. Georgia, a Supreme Court decision in which a private individual sued the state of Georgia. The amendment expanded the sovereign immunity of states to limit suits against them by private individuals from other states.

Strong was also one of a small group of senators who convinced President George Washington in 1794 that a special envoy should be sent to Britain in order to avert war, and who convinced John Jay to accept that role. Jay ended up negotiating what became known as the Jay Treaty, which resolved a number of issues between the two nations but also angered the leadership of Revolutionary France and was widely disliked, criticized, and opposed by Republicans. Strong resigned his seat in 1796 and returned to private life in Northampton.

== First term as governor ==
In the election of 1800, Strong was nominated by the Federalists as their candidate for governor; his principal opponent was Elbridge Gerry, nominated by the Democratic-Republicans. Strong was criticized by his opponents for his lack of military service and for the fact that he was a lawyer; he countered by asserting his patriotism through his association with Joseph Hawley. His popularity in the western part of the state was decisive: the wide margin by which he won there overcame the smaller advantage by which Gerry carried the east. Acting Governor Moses Gill died ten days before Strong took office at the end of May.

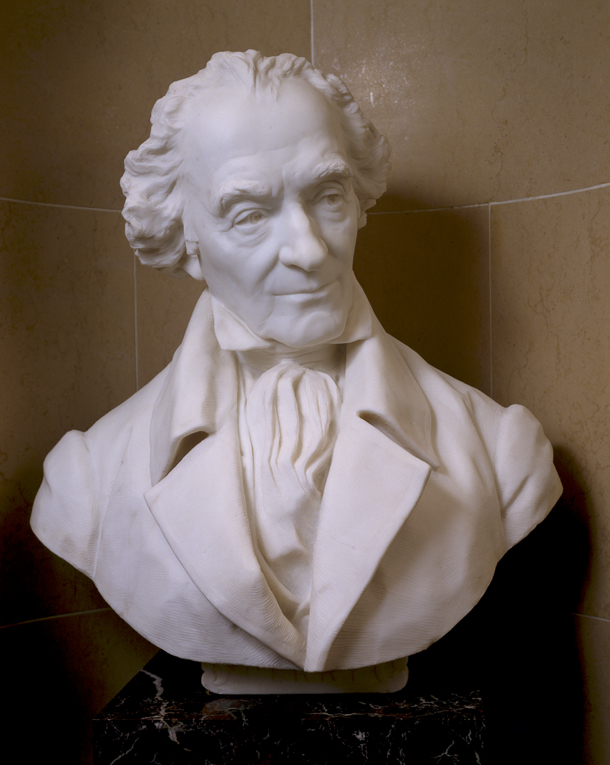
Bust of Elbridge Gerry, Strong's frequent gubernatorial opponent (Herbert Adams, 1892)

Strong won annual reelection to the governor's seat until 1807. During this tenure, the state introduced a new penitentiary system and reformed the judiciary, reducing the number of judges. Strong's time as governor was also marked by virulent political debate in the state, principally over foreign policy related to British interference with Massachusetts maritime trade. That interference was a consequence of the ongoing Napoleonic Wars engulfing Europe. Over the years of Strong's tenure, the Republicans gradually gained in power both nationally and in Massachusetts.

In the 1806 election, the Republicans secured a majority in the Massachusetts assembly, and the gubernatorial election was notably close. Running mainly against James Sullivan, Strong barely received a majority of the votes cast. With fewer than 200 votes in the balance, the Republican-controlled legislature scrutinized the returns in a partisan manner, discarding ballots that had misspelled Strong's name while retaining those that misspelled Sullivan's and performing tallies in ways that favored their candidate. This process concluded with a finding that Strong in fact lacked a majority of votes, which was required to carry the election, as opposed to the modern plurality requirement. Strong's Federalist allies in the legislature were able to publicize the partisan nature of the analysis, resulting in a hostile public backlash. He was proclaimed the winner after further, less biased, analysis corrected the count in his favor. However, in the 1807 election the rising tide of Republicanism swept Strong (along with other New England Federalists) out of office. Federalists asked him to run in 1808, but he refused, noting that he had "done his part" and that his home base in Hampshire County was strongly Federalist.

== Second term and War of 1812 ==
In 1812 Strong was convinced by Massachusetts Federalist leaders to come out of retirement to run once again for governor. War with Britain was imminent, and the Federalists sought a strong candidate to oppose Elbridge Gerry, who had been victorious against Christopher Gore in the previous two elections. Gerry, who had originally been somewhat moderate, became increasingly partisan during his tenure, and Federalists viewed Strong's earlier success in office and relatively modest demeanor as assets. Strong's victory in the election, which saw the Federalists also regain control of the legislature, was attributed to several factors: Federalists capitalized on the partisanship of the recent redistricting of the state that resulted in the coining of the term "gerrymander", and there was strong anti-war sentiment in the state. Strong was reelected by wide margins in the following war years.

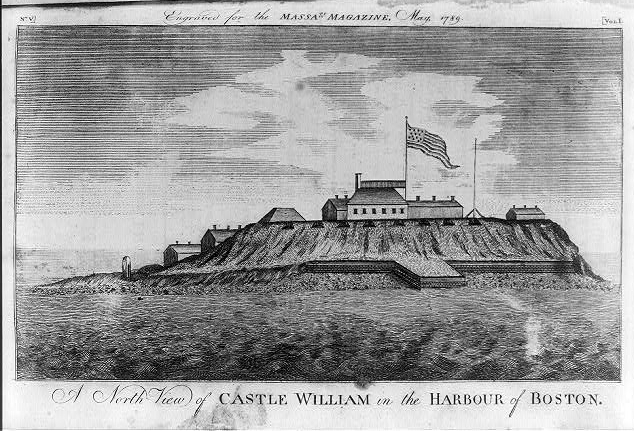
Fort Adams, the principal defense of Boston Harbor, in 1789. It was later rededicated Fort Independence.

Strong took a principled stand against the War of 1812, generally refusing to assist federal government efforts to prosecute the war. Strong was part of a chorus of Massachusetts (and more broadly New England) Federalists who complained that in "Mr. Madison's War" the federal government was trampling state and individual rights. He adhered to the view that state militia could not be required to serve under regular army command. When the first such requests were made by U. S. Army General Henry Dearborn, Strong refused and was backed by the Governor's Council as well as the Supreme Judicial Court. He argued that there was no need to call out the militia because invasion was not imminent. Because of his stance against regular army command, the state was denied a shipment of arms that was instead diverted to frontier areas and the war theater. Strong also took no particular actions to prevent widespread smuggling along the state's frontiers with the neighboring British provinces.

Strong's opposition to regular army control was more nuanced than that of neighboring Connecticut Governor John Cotton Smith, who ensured that his militia always remained under state command. Strong was more concerned that the state militia not be used except in defense of the state's borders, and he compromised on the issue of command. In 1812, not long after refusing General Dearborn's request, he authorized the dispatch of militia companies to the state's eastern district (now Maine) under U.S. Army command.

With the British naval blockade tightening and threatening the state's coastal communities in early 1814, Strong authorized Brigadier General Thomas H. Cushing to command militia forces in the defenses of Boston Harbor, subject to reasonable limitations. Cushing was transferred to Connecticut, and General Dearborn again commanded the regular army forces in Massachusetts. Dearborn interpreted the agreement Strong had made with Cushing to apply statewide and began reorganizing militia companies to conform to regular army practices. This engendered ill will among the militia, and Strong refused to place additional levies under Dearborn's command.

British General Sir John Coape Sherbrooke, Lieutenant Governor of Nova Scotia and leader of the expedition that in 1814 occupied Castine

The defense of Maine, however, proved problematic. Strong's aide William H. Sumner negotiated an agreement with the Army command for the defense of Portland, but the ironically Republican-dominated district militia objected, first to the idea of serving under any regular army leadership, and then to serving under a relatively low-ranked officer (a lieutenant colonel) who was given command of Portland after the agreement was signed. Several units of local militia refused the perform their assigned duties. One consequence of the dispute was that most militia in the state remained under state control and were thus paid from state coffers at a cost of around $200,000 per month. This further strained the state economy, which was already suffering because of the British blockade.

Following the British seizure of Castine in September 1814, Strong called the legislature into session early in October to respond to the occupation. Given that the federal government was unwilling to fund militia not under its control, the legislature authorized Strong to borrow money to fund a major expansion of the militia, but most of the funds acquired were spent improving Boston's defenses. Another result of the special session was a call for a meeting of states opposed to the war, which became known as the Hartford Convention. Around the time of the convention, which was held in Hartford, Connecticut, beginning in December 1814, Strong secretly wrote to Nova Scotia Lieutenant-Governor Sir John Coape Sherbrooke, essentially offering a separate peace in exchange for the return of the seized territory. He also refused to authorize temporary Massachusetts funding for a federally led expedition to recover Castine, leading to further cries of indignation from Maine's Republicans. The Treaty of Ghent ended the war before the Nova Scotia negotiations went anywhere. Strong's policies during the war are credited as one of the reasons for Maine's drive for statehood, which came to a successful conclusion in 1820.

In 1816, with the war at an end, Strong decided once again to retire from politics. Strong died in Northampton on November 7, 1819, and was buried in its Bridge Street Cemetery.

== Family, charity, and legacy ==
In 1777 Strong married Sarah Hooker, the daughter of a local pastor and descendant of Thomas Hooker, founder and first governor of Connecticut. They had nine children, four of whom survived the couple. Strong was active in his church and was a leading member of local missionary and Bible societies. He was a founding member of the American Academy of Arts and Sciences and a member of the Massachusetts Historical Society. In 1813, Strong was elected a member of the American Antiquarian Society.

In World War II, the United States Liberty ship SS Caleb Strong was named in his honor. The town of Strong, Maine, incorporated in 1801, was named for Strong, and Windham Township, Portage County, Ohio was originally named Strongsburg in his honor. The Strongsburg land had been allocated to Strong as part of his ownership share in the Ohio Company and had been sold by him and several minority partners in 1810.

== Notes ==
Party political offices
Preceded by Increase Sumner	Federalist nominee for Governor of Massachusetts; 1800, 1801, 1802, 1803, 1804, 1805, 1806, 1807	Succeeded by Christopher Gore
Preceded by Christopher Gore	Federalist nominee for Governor of Massachusetts; 1812, 1813, 1814, 1815	Succeeded by John Brooks
U.S. Senate
Preceded by New office	U.S. senator (Class 2) from Massachusetts; March 4, 1789 – June 1, 1796; Served alongside: Tristram Dalton, George Cabot	Succeeded by Theodore Sedgwick
Political offices
Preceded by Governor's Council as Acting governor	Governor of Massachusetts; May 30, 1800 – May 29, 1807	Succeeded by James Sullivan
Preceded by Elbridge Gerry	Governor of Massachusetts; June 5, 1812 – May 30, 1816	Succeeded by John Brooks
