= 1800 Massachusetts gubernatorial election =

- April 7, 1800
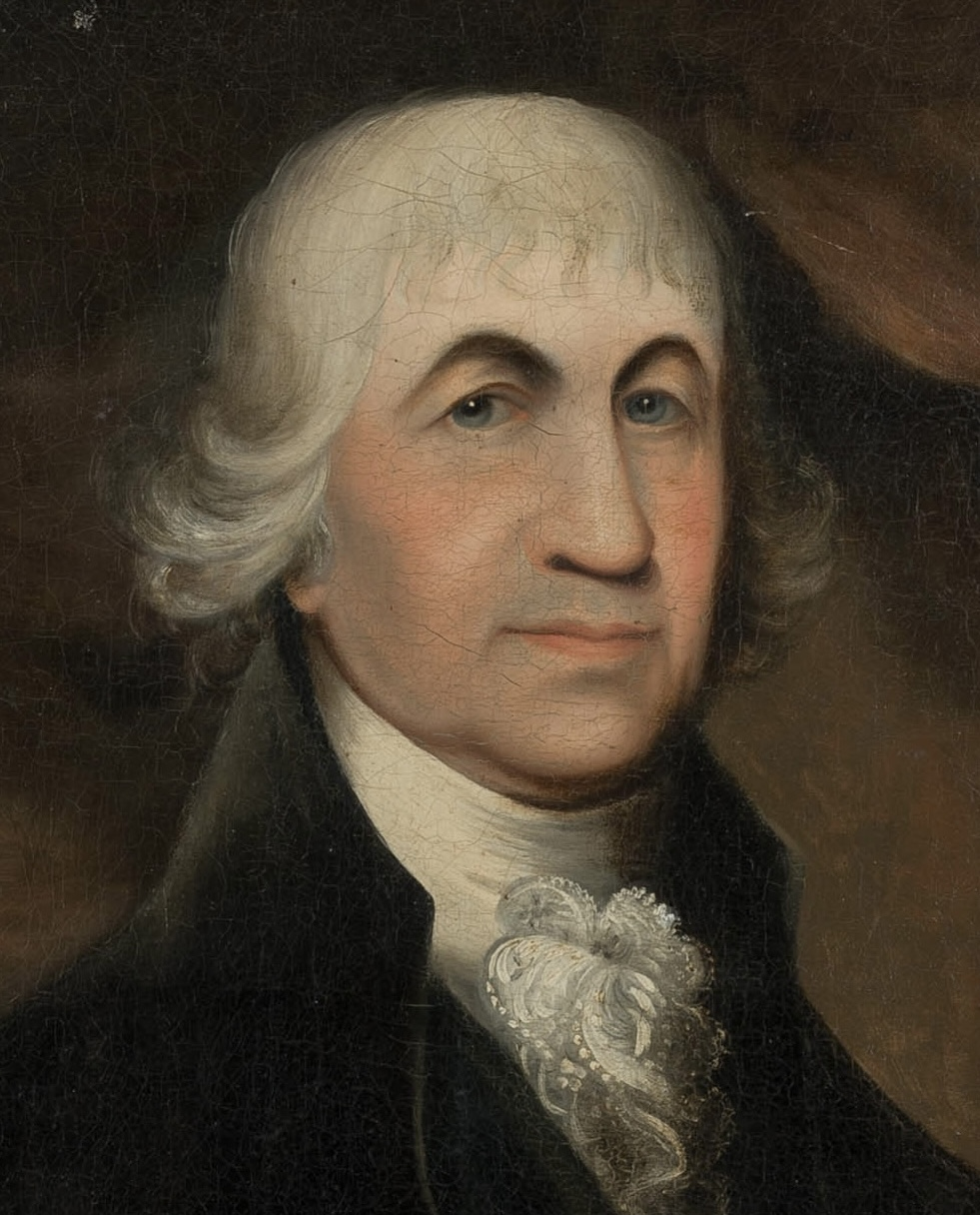

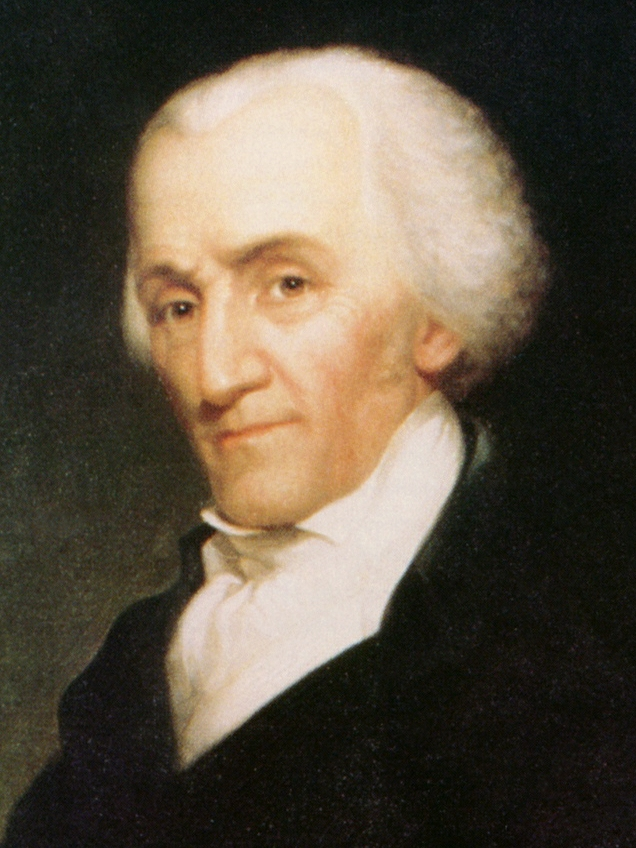

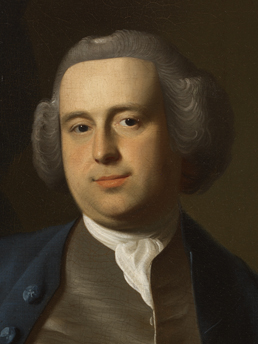
Nominee	Caleb Strong	Elbridge Gerry	Moses Gill
Party	Federalist	Democratic-Republican	Federalist
Popular vote	19,630	17,019	2,019
Percentage	50.26%	43.57%	5.17%
- County results Strong: 40–50% 50–60% 60–70% 80–90% Gerry: 50–60% 60–70% 70–80% 80–90%
Governor before election
Moses Gill (acting)
Federalist
Elected Governor
Caleb Strong
Federalist

The 1800 Massachusetts gubernatorial election was held on April 7.

Federalist Caleb Strong was elected over Democratic-Republican Elbridge Gerry.

Lieutenant Governor Moses Gill, who had been acting as governor since the June 7 death of Increase Sumner, preferred to run for re-election to that position, and he won re-election in a concurrent election. However, he received a significant number of votes for governor as well.

Acting governor Gill actually died before the 1801 term began, leaving the Governor's Council to conduct gubernatorial duties until Strong's term started.

== General election ==
=== Results ===
1800 Massachusetts gubernatorial election
Party	Candidate	Votes	%	±%
Federalist	Caleb Strong	19,630	50.26%	
Democratic-Republican	Elbridge Gerry	17,019	43.57%	
Federalist	Moses Gill (incumbent)	2,019	5.17%	
Others	Scattering	391	1.00%	
Federalist hold		Swing		
