= 1812 Massachusetts gubernatorial election =

- April 6, 1812
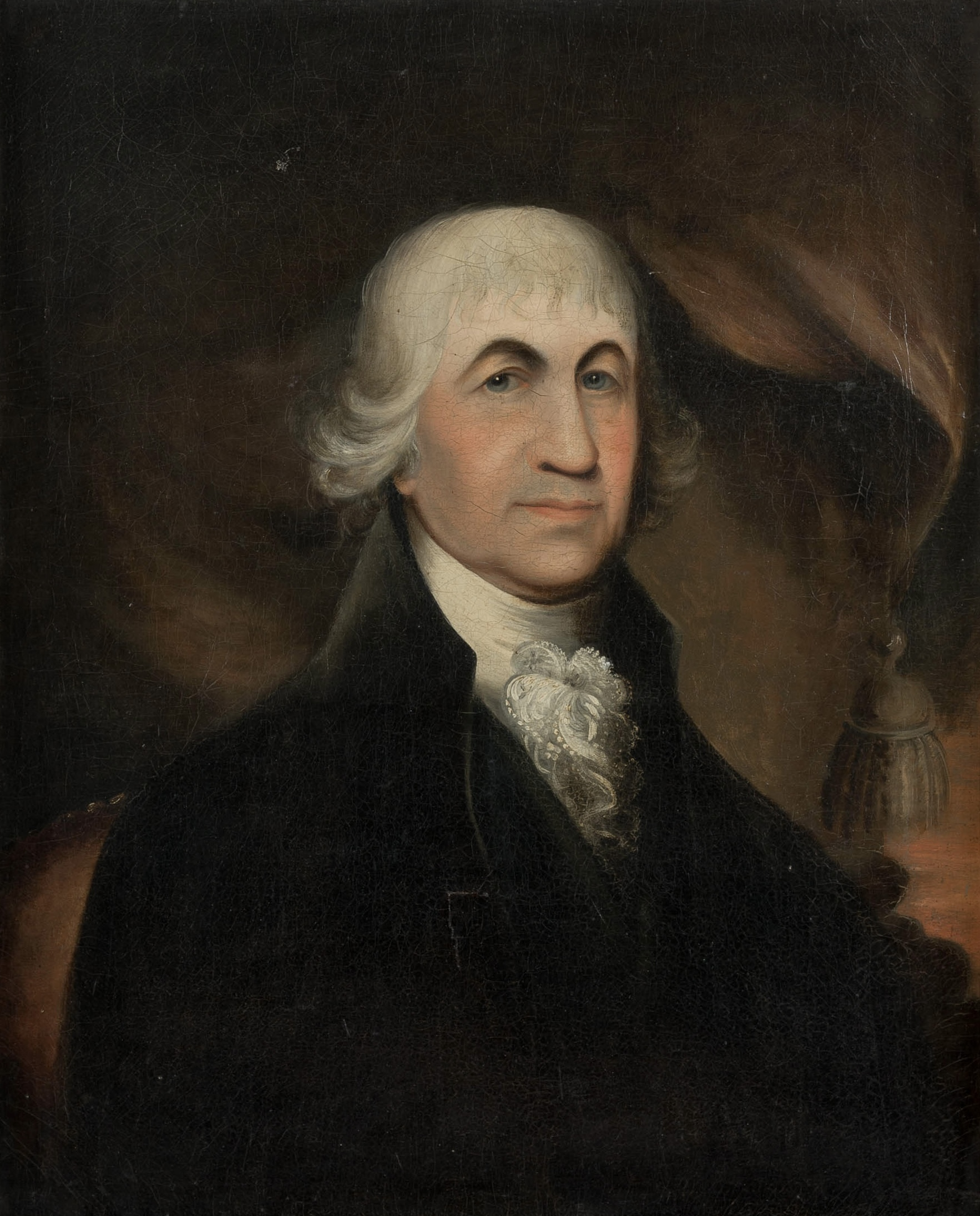

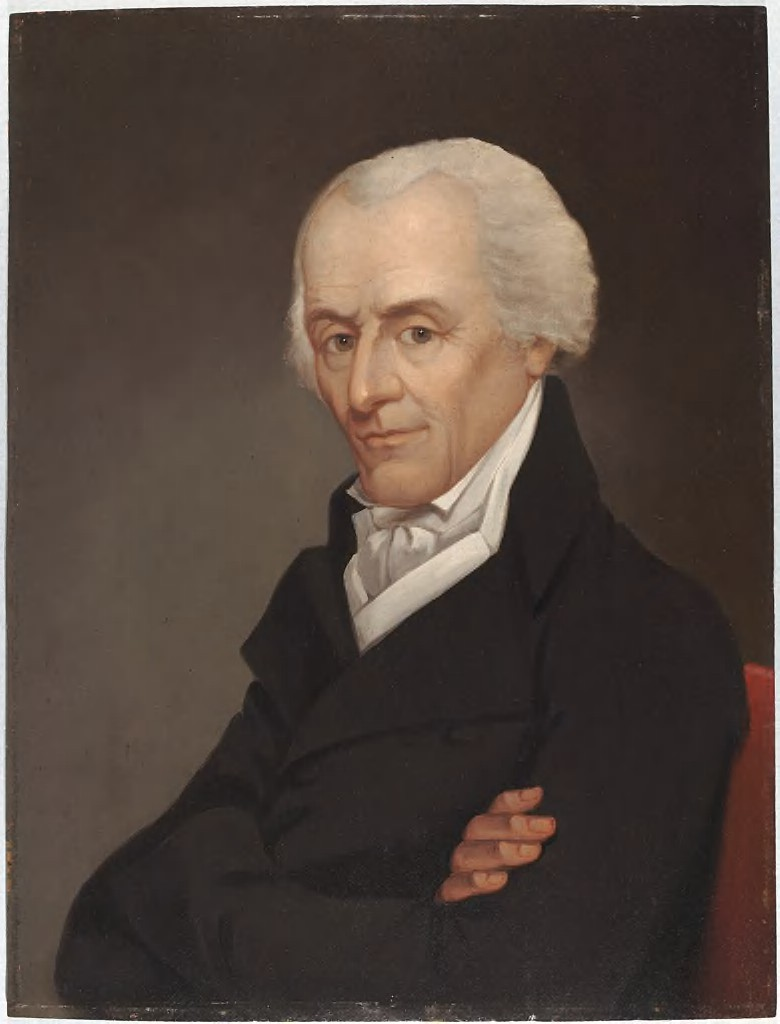
| Nominee | Caleb Strong | Elbridge Gerry |
| Party | Federalist | Democratic-Republican |
| Popular vote | 52,696 | 51,326 |
| Percentage | 50.60% | 49.28% |
- County results Strong: 50–60% 60–70% Gerry: 50–60% 60–70%
Governor before election
Elbridge Gerry
Democratic-Republican
Elected Governor
Caleb Strong
Federalist

The 1812 Massachusetts gubernatorial election was held on April 6, 1812.

Incumbent Democratic-Republican Governor Elbridge Gerry was defeated by Federalist nominee Caleb Strong.

== General election ==
=== Candidates ===
- Elbridge Gerry, incumbent governor (Democratic-Republican)
- Caleb Strong, former governor (Federalist)

=== Results ===
1812 Massachusetts gubernatorial election
| Party | Candidate | Votes | % | ±% |
|---|---|---|---|---|
| Federalist | Caleb Strong | 52,696 | 50.60% | |
| Democratic-Republican | Elbridge Gerry (incumbent) | 51,326 | 49.28% | |
| Scattering | | 124 | 0.12% | |
| Majority | | 1,370 | 1.32% | |
| Turnout | | 104,146 | | |
| Federalist gain from Democratic-Republican | | Swing | | |

== Analysis ==
Although the Federalists in Massachusetts had successfully taken the house and the governor's seat from the Democratic-Republican party in the 1812 election cycle, these gains did not translate into control of the Massachusetts State Senate, which remained in the hands of the Democratic-Republicans. The cause for this lay in new constitutionally mandated electoral district boundaries that the state had adopted prior to the election. The Republican-controlled legislature had created district boundaries designed to enhance their party's control over state and national offices, leading to some oddly shaped legislative districts. Although Gerry was unhappy about the highly partisan districting (according to his son-in-law, he thought it "highly disagreeable"), he signed the legislation. The shape of one of the state senate districts in Essex County was compared to a salamander by a local Federalist newspaper in a political cartoon, calling it a "Gerry-mander". Ever since, the creation of such districts has been called gerrymandering.

On May 30, 1812, Nathaniel Ames wrote in his diary that "Strong declared Governor by majority of 600! and not near so many as the illegal vote of Boston." (Note: In Ames' hometown of Dedham, voters cast 299 votes for Elbridge Gerry and 172 for Caleb Strong. The Republicans gained 46 votes over the previous election but the Federalists gained 56.)
