= 1802 Massachusetts gubernatorial election =

- April 6, 1802
- Turnout: 11.73% of population (▲0.89)
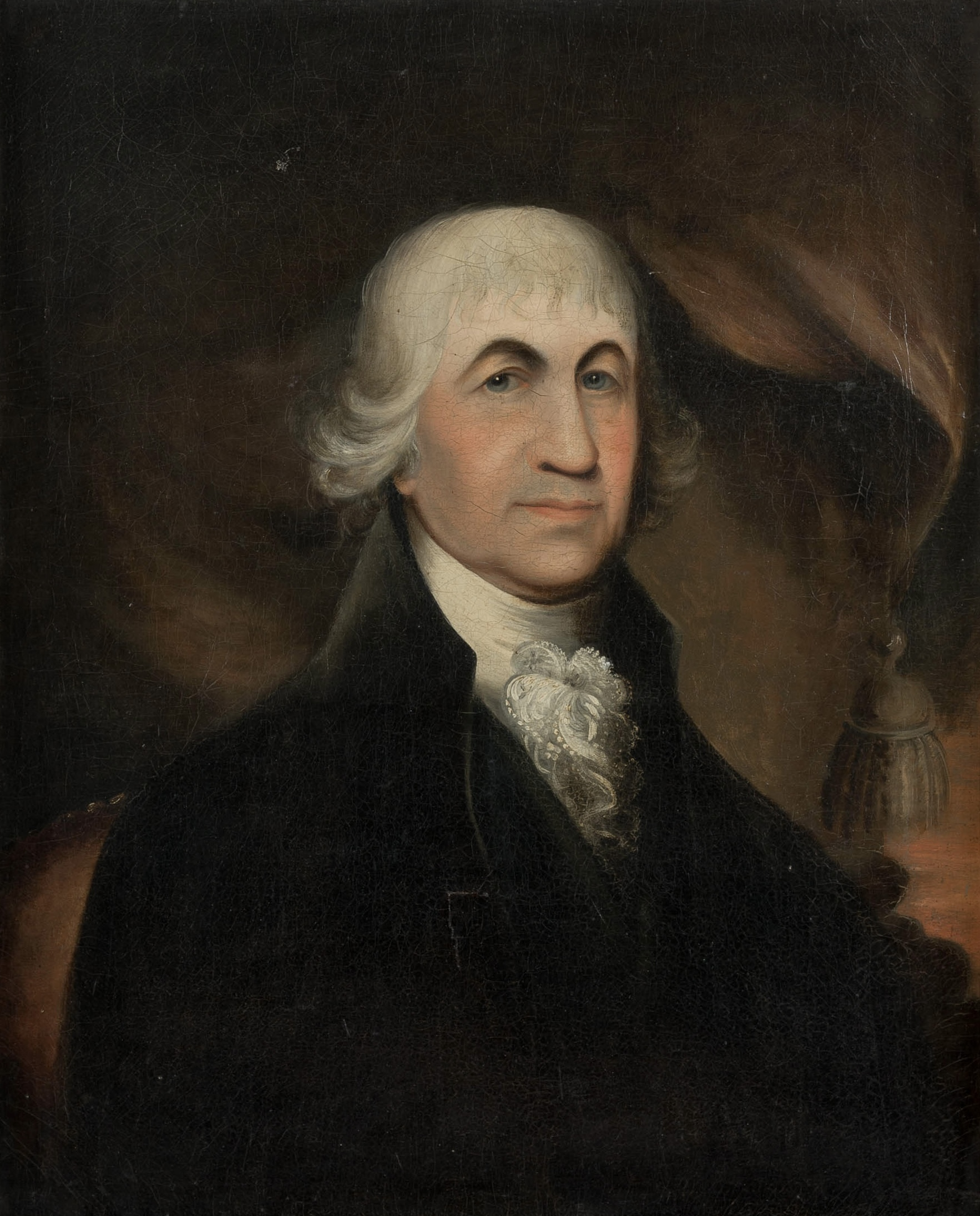

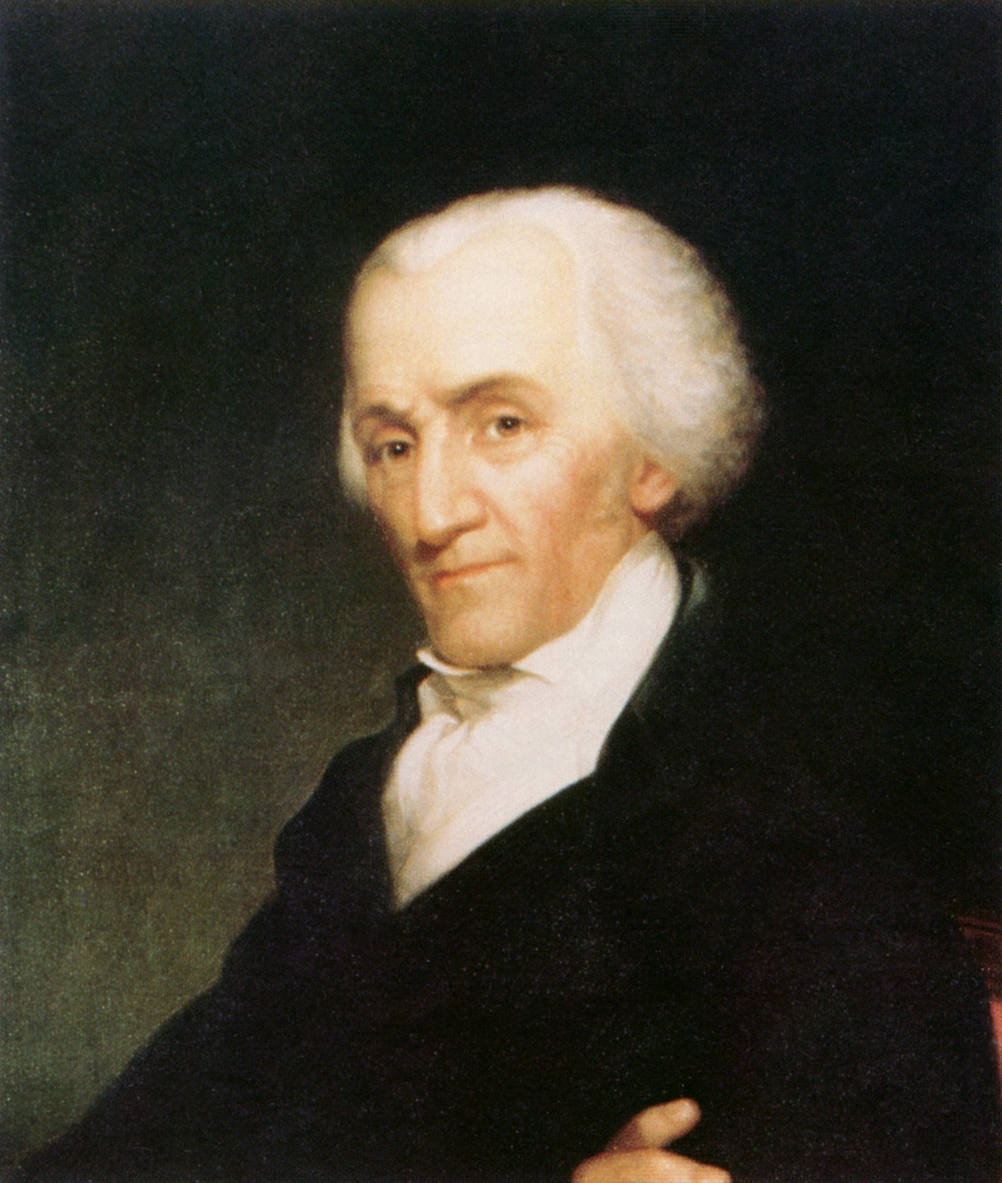
Nominee	Caleb Strong	Elbridge Gerry
Party	Federalist	Democratic-Republican
Popular vote	30,456	19,768
Percentage	60.45%	39.24%
- County results Strong: 50–60% 60–70% 70–80% 80–90% 90–100% Gerry: 50–60% 60–70% 70–80%
Governor before election
Caleb Strong
Federalist
Elected Governor
Caleb Strong
Federalist

The 1802 Massachusetts gubernatorial election was held on April 6.

Federalist Governor Caleb Strong was re-elected to a third consecutive one-year term in office, defeating Democratic-Republican Elbridge Gerry again for the third time.

== General election ==
=== Results ===
1802 Massachusetts gubernatorial election
Party	Candidate	Votes	%	±%
Federalist	Caleb Strong (incumbent)	30,456	60.45%	
Democratic-Republican	Elbridge Gerry	19,768	39.24%	
Others	Scattering	156	0.31%	
Total votes		50,380	100.00%	
Federalist hold		Swing		
