= 1807 Massachusetts gubernatorial election =

- April 6, 1807
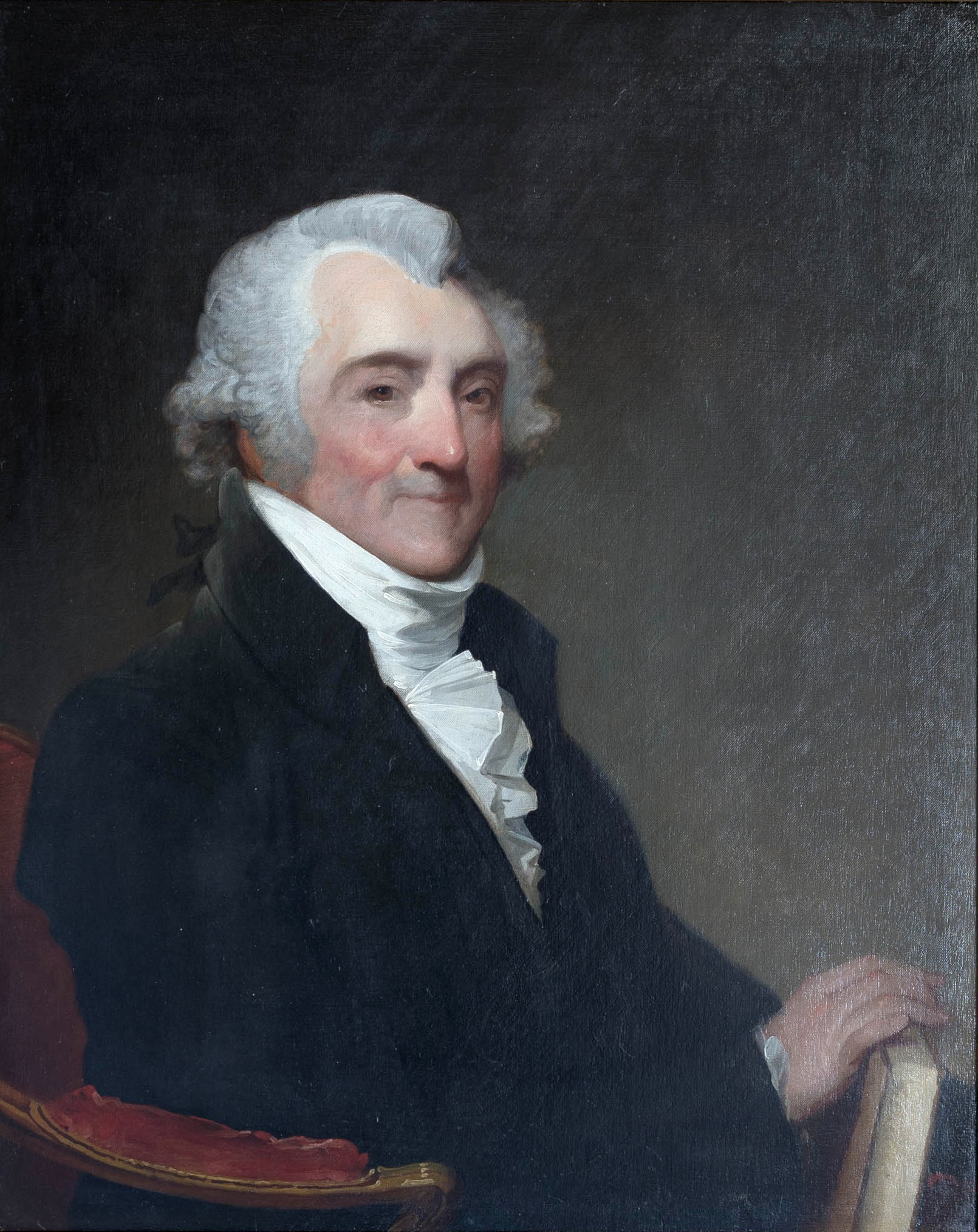

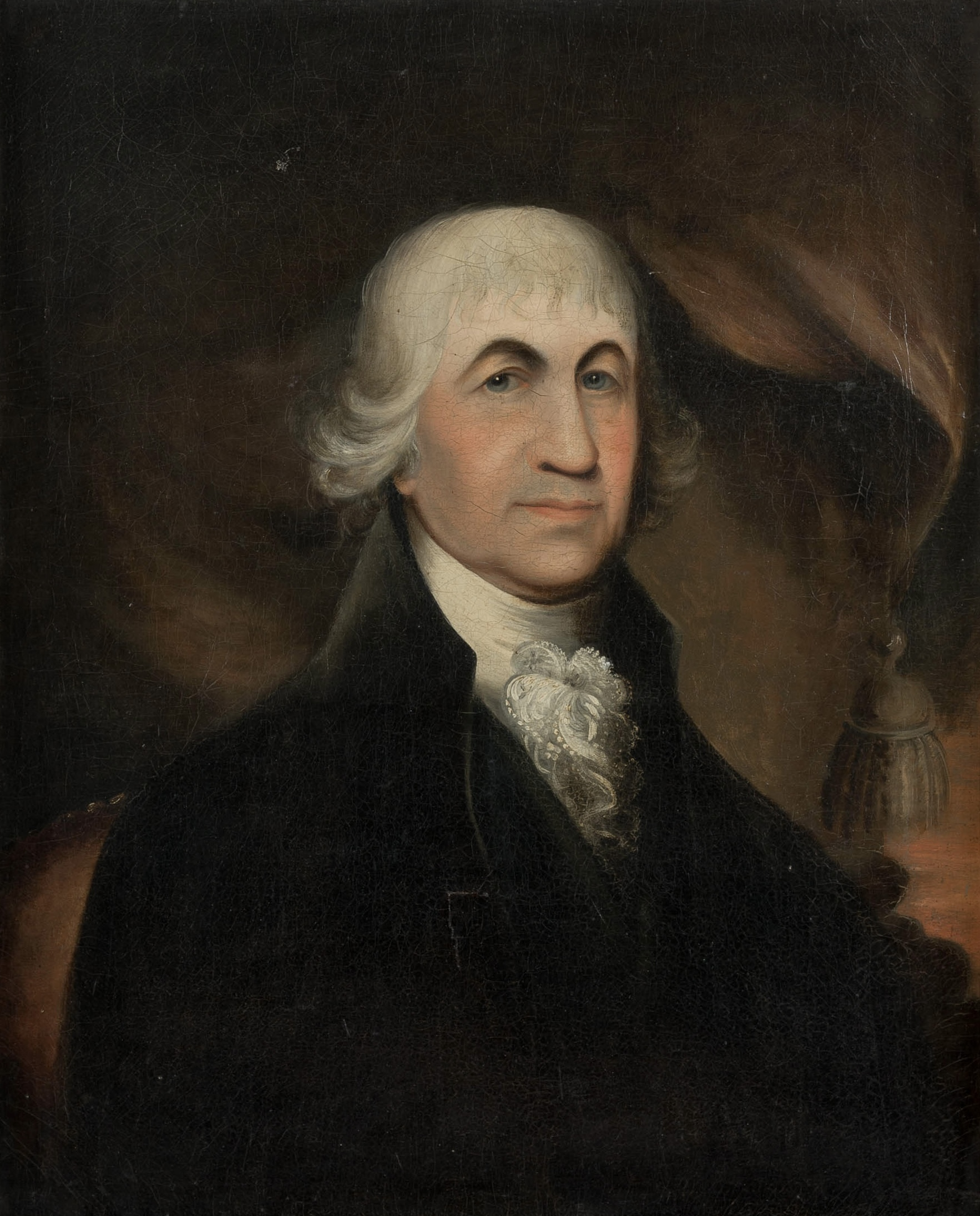
Nominee	James Sullivan	Caleb Strong
Party	Democratic-Republican	Federalist
Popular vote	41,954	39,224
Percentage	51.47%	48.12%
- County results Sullivan: 50–60% 60–70% 70–80% Strong: 50–60% 60–70%
Governor before election
Caleb Strong
Federalist
Elected Governor
James Sullivan
Democratic-Republican

The 1807 Massachusetts gubernatorial election was held on April 6, 1807.

Incumbent Federalist Governor Caleb Strong was defeated by Democratic-Republican nominee James Sullivan.

== General election ==
=== Candidates ===
- Caleb Strong, Federalist, incumbent Governor
- James Sullivan, Democratic-Republican, incumbent Attorney General of Massachusetts

=== Results ===
1807 Massachusetts gubernatorial election (Note: Some sources give Sullivan's vote as 41,960.)
Party	Candidate	Votes	%	±%
Democratic-Republican	James Sullivan	41,954	51.47%	
Federalist	Caleb Strong (incumbent)	39,224	48.12%	
Scattering		328	0.40%	
Majority		2,730	3.35%	
Turnout		81,506		
Democratic-Republican gain from Federalist		Swing		
