= Milton M. Klein =

American historian

- Born: August 15, 1917; New York City
- Died: June 10, 2004 (aged 86); Halls, Tennessee
- Education: City College of New York
- Spouse: Margaret Gordon
- Children: 2
- Scientific career
- Fields: History
- Workplaces: United States Army Air Forces

Milton Martin Klein (15 August 1917 – 10 June 2004) was an American historian.

He was born in New York City on 15 August 1917 to Margaret and Edward Klein. Milton Klein earned bachelor's and master's degrees from the City College of New York. While studying for his master's in education, Klein taught high school history. His career as a schoolteacher was broken up by World War II, during which he served with the United States Army Air Forces from 1942 to 1946. After the war, Klein remained a member of the Air Force Reserve, retiring with the rank of lieutenant colonel in 1977. Klein continued teaching at the high school level as he worked toward a doctorate from Columbia University. He earned the degree in 1954, and remained in secondary education until 1957. He served as lecturer at Colombia between 1954 and 1958, when he joined the faculty of Long Island University. Klein was subsequently named dean of the College of Liberal Arts and Sciences at Long Island in 1962. Klein left for a deanship of graduate studies and research at Fredonia College in 1966, then moved to the University of Tennessee at Knoxville in 1969. He was named Alumni Distinguished Service Professor in 1977, and the first Lindsay Young Professor of History in 1980. After retirement from the faculty in 1985, Klein became university historian in 1988. The University of Tennessee holds an annual lecture series named for Klein.

Klein married Margaret Gordon on 25 August 1963, with whom he had two children, Edward and Peter. Klein died of cancer at St. Mary's Residential Hospice in Halls, Tennessee, on 10 June 2004.
