= 1809 Massachusetts gubernatorial election =

- April 3, 1809
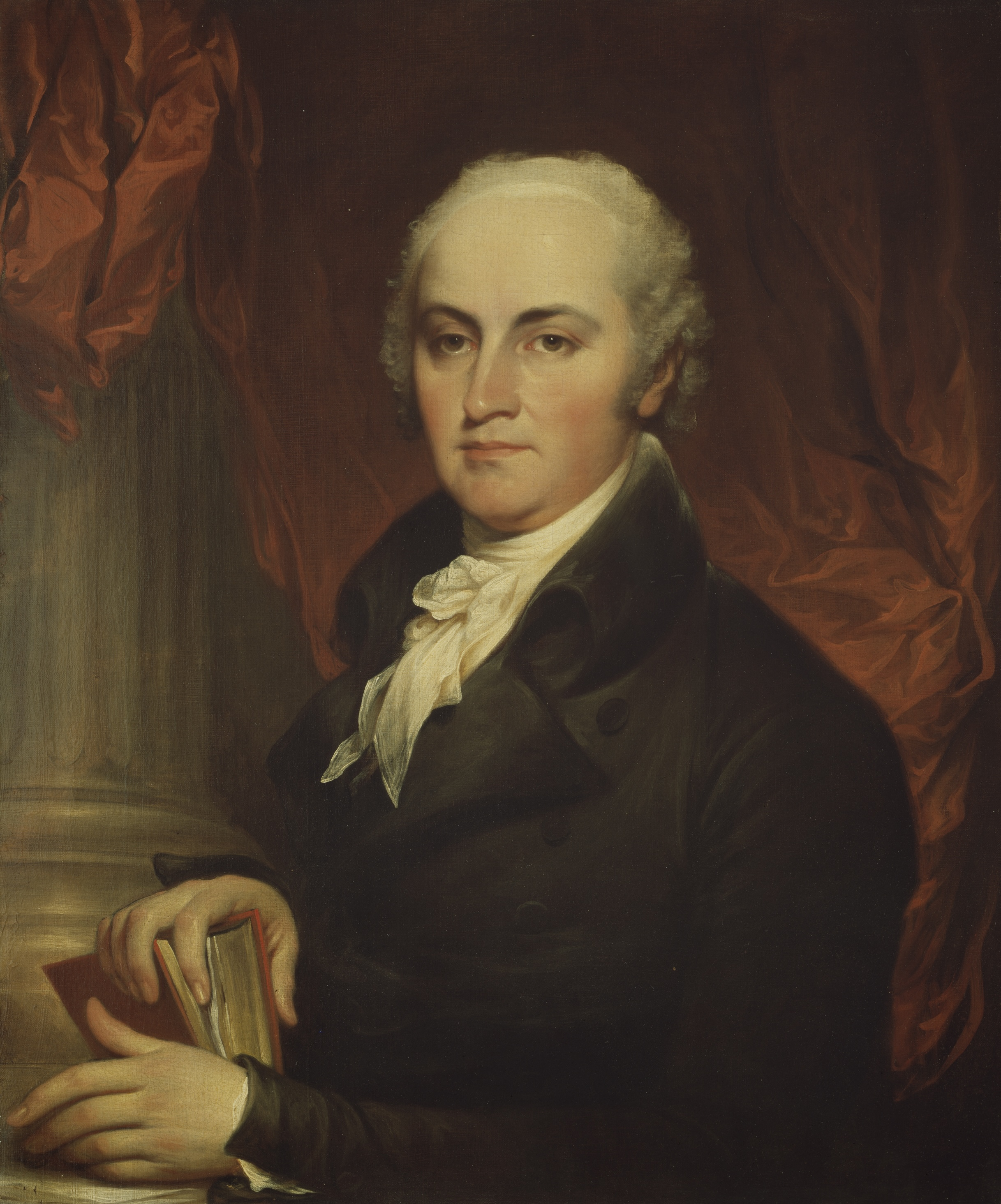

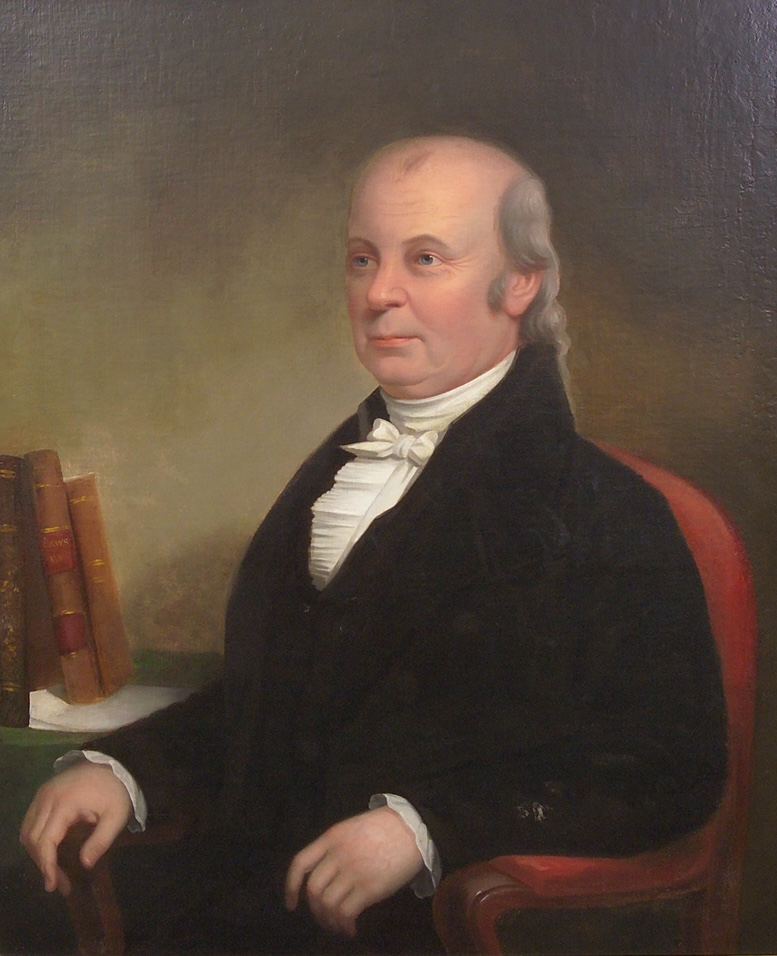
Nominee	Christopher Gore	Levi Lincoln Sr.
Party	Federalist	Democratic-Republican
Popular vote	47,916	45,118
Percentage	51.34%	48.35%
- County results Gore: 50–60% 60–70% Lincoln: 50–60% 60–70%
Governor before election
Levi Lincoln Sr. (acting)
Democratic-Republican
Elected Governor
Christopher Gore
Federalist

The 1809 Massachusetts gubernatorial election was held on April 3, 1809.

Incumbent Democratic-Republican Governor Levi Lincoln Sr. had succeeded to the Governorship on the death of Governor James Sullivan on December 10, 1808. Lincoln was defeated for election to a term in his own right by Federalist nominee Christopher Gore.

== General election ==
=== Candidates ===
- Levi Lincoln Sr., Democratic-Republican, acting Governor, former Attorney General of the United States
- Christopher Gore, Federalist, member of the Massachusetts House of Representatives, Federalist nominee for Governor in 1808

=== Results ===
1809 Massachusetts gubernatorial election
Party	Candidate	Votes	%	±%
Federalist	Christopher Gore	47,916	51.34%	
Democratic-Republican	Levi Lincoln Sr. (incumbent)	45,118	48.35%	
Scattering		288	0.31%	
Majority		2,798	3.00%	
Turnout		93,322		
Federalist gain from Democratic-Republican		Swing		
