= John Codman Hurd =

American lawyer

John Codman Hurd (November 11, 1816 – June 25, 1892) was an American lawyer and author.

Hurd, son of John R. and Catharine M, (Codman) Hurd, was born in Boston, Mass., on November 11, 1816. His father was a merchant in New York City, and he had spent two years in Columbia College before entering the Sophomore class at Yale College. After graduation in 1836 he studied for a year in the Yale Law School, and for two years more in an office in New York City. He was admitted to the bar, and was nominally, though at no time actively, engaged in legal practice in New York until after his father's death, in 1872. After he was released from filial duty he traveled abroad extensively. He died at the house of his sister in Boston, Mass., where he had lately made his home, on June 25, 1892, after an illness of several weeks, in the 76th year of his age. He was never married.

During an era of intense debate about the judicial role in deciding interstate disputes about slavery, he published a two-volume treatise titled The Law of Freedom and Bondage (1858) investigating the role of natural law within the legal system specifically with respect to the question of slavery. In recognition of his ability Yale conferred on him in 1877 the honorary degree of Doctor of Laws. He also published in 1881 another l volume on The Theory of our National Existence as shown by the Action of the Government of the United States since 1861. Hurd's writings about the work and ideas of British legal theorist John Austin are responsible for spreading Austin's influence in the United States.

Since his death his nephew and executor presented to the Yale University Library in Dr. Hurd's name a very valuable collection of upwards of a hundred and twenty-five volumes from his working library, including his annotated editions of his own publications and the most important authorities in this line of study.

This article incorporates public domain material from the 1893 Yale Obituary Record.

== See also ==
- T.R.R. Cobb
- Quock Walker
- Levi Lincoln
