= James Sullivan (Massachusetts politician) =

American lawyer, jurist, and politician

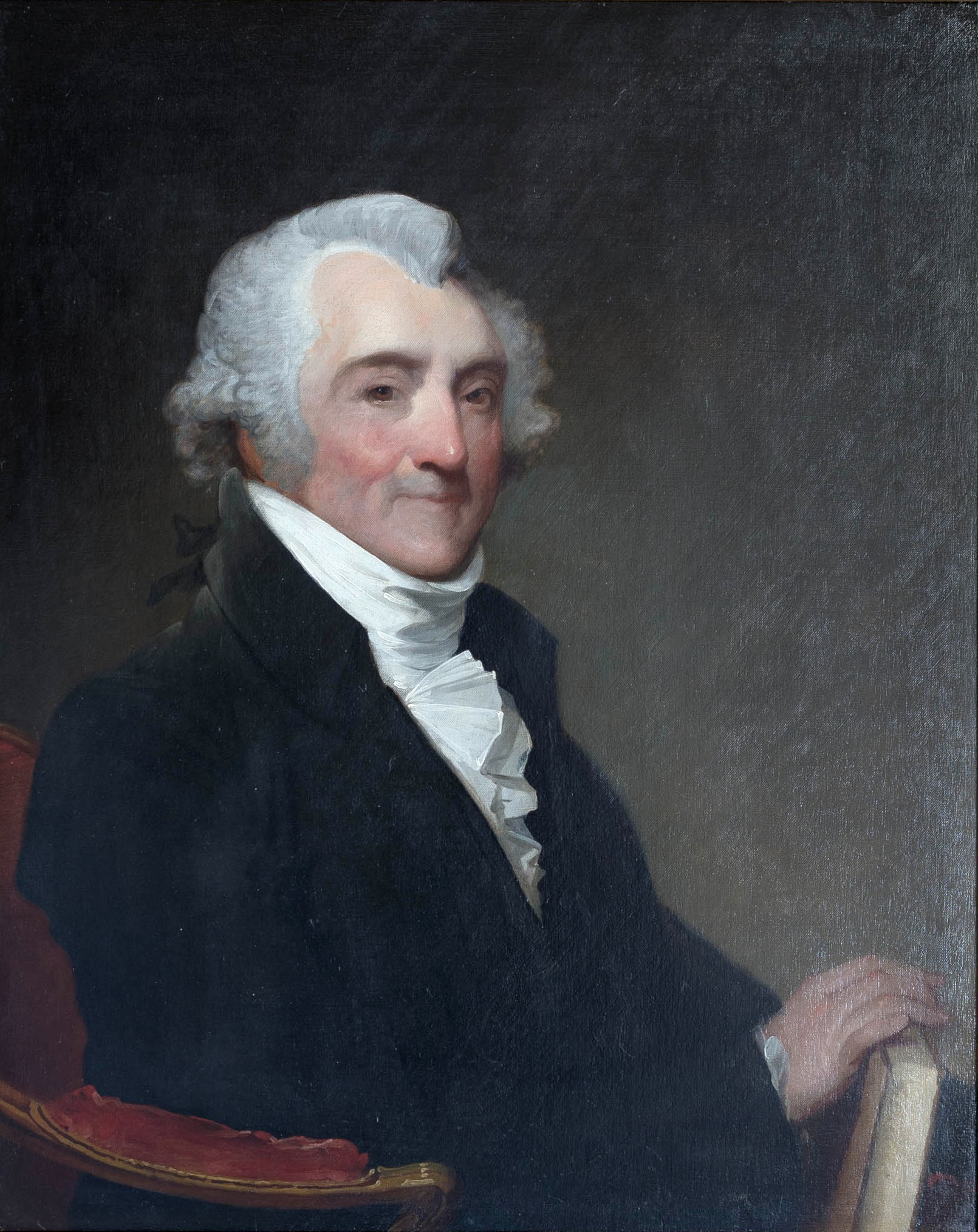
- Portrait by Gilbert Stuart, c. 1807

7th Governor of Massachusetts
- In office May 29, 1807 – December 10, 1808
- Lieutenant: Levi Lincoln Sr.
- Preceded by: Caleb Strong
- Succeeded by: Levi Lincoln Sr. (acting)

2nd Massachusetts Attorney General
- In office 1790–1807
- Preceded by: Robert Treat Paine
- Succeeded by: Barnabas Bidwell

Personal details
- Born: April 22, 1744 Berwick, Province of Massachusetts Bay (present-day Maine)
- Died: December 10, 1808 (aged 64) Boston, Massachusetts
- Party: Democratic-Republican
- Spouses: Mehitable Odiorne; Martha Langdon

James Sullivan (April 22, 1744 – December 10, 1808) was an American lawyer and politician in Massachusetts. He was an early associate justice of the Massachusetts Supreme Judicial Court, served as the state's attorney general for many years, and as governor of the state from 1807 until his death.

Sullivan was born and raised in Berwick, Maine (then part of Massachusetts), and studied law with his brother John. After establishing a successful law practice, he became actively involved in the Massachusetts state government during the American Revolutionary War, and was appointed to the state's highest court in March 1776. He was involved in drafting the state constitution and the state's ratifying convention for the United States Constitution. After resigning from the bench in 1782 he returned to private practice, and was appointed Attorney General in 1790. During his years as judge and attorney general he was responsible for drafting and revising much of the state's legislation as part of the transition from British rule to independence. While attorney general he worked with the commission that established the border between Maine and New Brunswick, and prosecuted several high-profile murder cases.

Sullivan was a political partisan, supporting the Democratic-Republican Party and subscribing to Jeffersonian republican ideals. He supported John Hancock and Samuel Adams in their political careers, and was a frequent contributor, often under one of many pseudonyms, to political dialogue in the state's newspapers. He ran unsuccessfully for governor several times before finally winning the office in 1807. He died in office during his second term.

In addition to his political pursuits Sullivan engaged in charitable and business endeavors. He was a leading proponent of the Middlesex Canal and the first bridge between Boston and Cambridge, and was instrumental in the development of Boston's first public water supply. He was the founding president of the Massachusetts Historical Society, and held membership in a variety of other charitable organizations. He wrote one of the first histories of his native Maine, and a legal text on land titles. Legal historian Charles Warren calls him one of the most important legal figures of the time in Massachusetts.

== Life ==
James Sullivan was born on April 22, 1744, the fourth son of John Sullivan and Margery Brown Sullivan, in Berwick, a part of the Province of Massachusetts Bay that is now in the state of Maine. Sullivan's parents were originally from Ireland: his father's family, descendants of the ancient Gaelic O'Sullivan Beare clan, hailed from the Beara Peninsula region of counties Cork and Kerry in the province of Munster, and his mother was orphaned as an infant in County Cork. The couple first met onboard the same transatlantic ship voyage to America, when his mother was a young child. When she came of age, his father wooed and wed her. Settled in Berwick, John Sullivan was a schoolteacher and farmer. James was educated at home, and any prospects for military service were dashed when his foot was crushed in a childhood accident. He also became afflicted with epilepsy while relatively young and suffered from generally mild seizures throughout his life. While convalescing from his foot injury, he read a great deal, learning Latin and the classics. His older brother John, a law student, was instructed to supply him with legal books and training. James later apprenticed at his brother's law practice in Durham, New Hampshire and eventually was admitted to the bar in Massachusetts. He established his own practice first in Georgetown, then shortly afterward in Biddeford, where he was the town's first resident lawyer. In 1768, he married Hetty Odiorne, the daughter of a successful Portsmouth, New Hampshire merchant.

Sullivan's law practice flourished, and by the time he was 30, he was one of York County's leading citizens. He supplemented his legal work by acting as an agent for the interests of Boston-based merchants, including John Hancock, one of Boston's wealthiest men. For his services as a lawyer successfully defending the land claims of early colonists' heirs, in 1773, Sullivan was offered part of a tract within one of the claims he defended, which encompassed roughly twenty miles square situated between the Great Ossipee, Saco, Little Ossipee, and Newichawannock (now Salmon Falls) rivers. Sullivan received approximately six thousand acres of land within the Ossipee tract, and his property was organized as Limerick Plantation, apparently named for the Irish birthplace of his father. In 1775, Sullivan helped to settle the area, personally assisting in the clearing of land. On March 6, 1787, the settlement was formally incorporated as the town of Limerick. According to John Adams, Sullivan shrewdly used his finances to invest in local real estate, including farmlands and industrial properties such as mills.

=== Revolution ===
Sullivan was an early and outspoken opponent of British colonial policies leading to the revolution. He was elected to the provincial assembly in 1774. When it first met in June, Sullivan was a leader in calling for a Continental Congress. When Governor Thomas Gage indefinitely delayed the next meeting of the assembly the following October, its members met anyway, establishing the Massachusetts Provincial Congress. This body exercised de facto control over Massachusetts during the early years of the American Revolutionary War. In addition to sitting in the provincial congress, Sullivan was a leading organizer of colonial defenses in York County, sitting on its committee of correspondence and other bodies. He was sent in 1775 as part of a commission to inspect the troops and facilities at Fort Ticonderoga in upstate New York, which was nominally under the control of Benedict Arnold, who had been issued a Massachusetts colonel's commission and succeeded in capturing it with the assistance of Ethan Allen. The arduous journey made Sullivan ill for several months afterward.

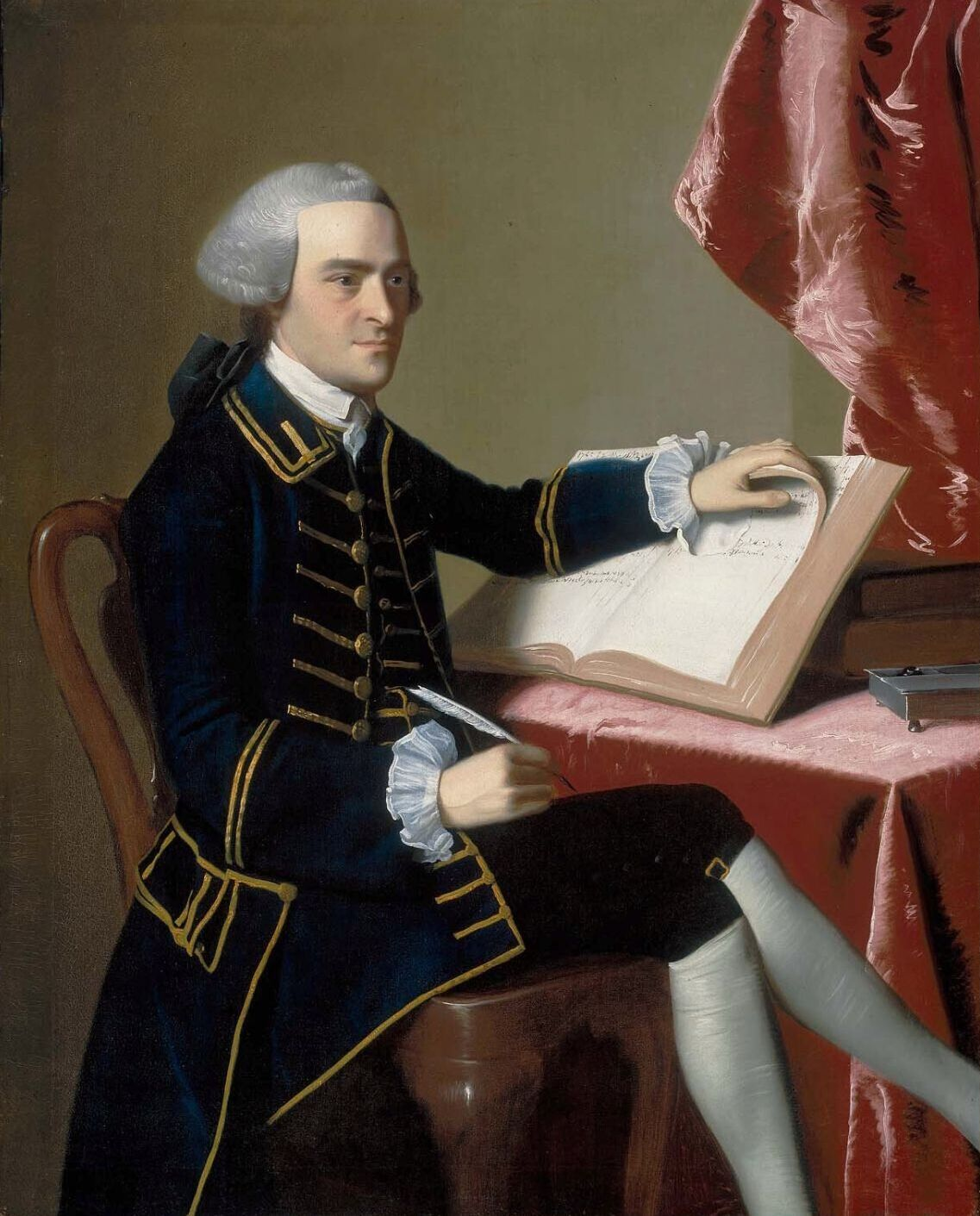
John Hancock

In late 1775 Sullivan was a member of the committee that drafted legislation establishing the Massachusetts State Navy. Under its terms, three positions were established for admiralty judges; Sullivan was appointed to be the admiralty judge for the eastern district (i.e. Maine) in addition to his other duties. During his period of service in the provincial congress he drafted a large amount of legislation and was tireless in his activities on many committees. He resigned this post when in March 1776 he was offered a seat on the Superior Court of Judicature (as the Massachusetts Supreme Judicial Court was then known).

=== Judicial service and postwar activities ===
At the time of his appointment to the bench, the position was seen as particularly risky, because it was a clear representation of anti-British authority whose placeholders were thought to be risking their lives should the British succeed in putting down the rebellion. The most noteworthy case Sullivan sat on was a preliminary hearing in Commonwealth v. Nathaniel Jennison, one of the Quock Walker cases where the court in 1783 decided that slavery was incompatible with the state constitution. Sullivan publicly expressed opposition to slavery, and predicted in his writings that the issue would become contentious in the future.

Sullivan participated in the 1779 convention that drafted the new state constitution. Between 1780 and 1782 he and the rest of the court were active in harmonizing the state's laws with the document, revising and discarding old statutes, and assisting in the drafting of new ones.

In 1779 Sullivan was awarded an honorary degree from Harvard College. He served on the court until 1782, when he resigned because his salary was insufficient to meet his expenses, and he could no longer afford to cover the difference. He opened a law office in Boston, and moved into a house in Menotomy (now Arlington, then still part of Cambridge). Although he was elected to represent Massachusetts at the Congress of the Confederation from 1782 to 1783 he did not attend, again for financial reasons. He was politically active in the state, however, supporting John Hancock and then Samuel Adams for governor. He was a prolific writer, contributing frequently to the political discourse that took place in Massachusetts' many newspapers under a variety of pseudonyms.

In 1787 Sullivan participated in the defense of individuals charged in participation in Shays' Rebellion, an uprising in the rural parts of the state begun the previous year. This activity earned him criticism from stalwart pro-government members of the Massachusetts Bar.

When Massachusetts debated ratification of the United States Constitution in 1788, Sullivan was one of a number of Massachusetts politicians who expressed reservations about the document, but generally supported ratification. In the debate he proposed that the convention conditionally adopt the Constitution, subject to Congress considering and acting on a suite of amendments. The seven amendments Sullivan proposed were primarily designed to increase state powers at the expense of Congress and the federal courts; for example, one would have allowed state supreme courts to issues writs of habeas corpus for persons charged with federal crimes.

=== Attorney General ===
John Hancock rewarded Sullivan for his support in 1790 with an appointment as the state's attorney general, a post he held until 1807. Although he supported the Democratic-Republican Party, his views were relatively moderate, so he retained the post of state attorney general despite the dominance of the Federalists in the state.

Much of Sullivan's legal work after independence was framed by republican ideals. His republicanism was expressed in wide-ranging support for individual rights, including those of women, children, and minorities, and manifested in letters to contemporaries including John Adams, cases he argued as a lawyer, and decisions he made as a judge. As attorney general he defended the state in a Loyalist recovery action involving the rights of married women (who at the time had few rights under the common law doctrine of coverture), arguing that Loyalist William Martin's wife had in her own right abandoned the property in question.

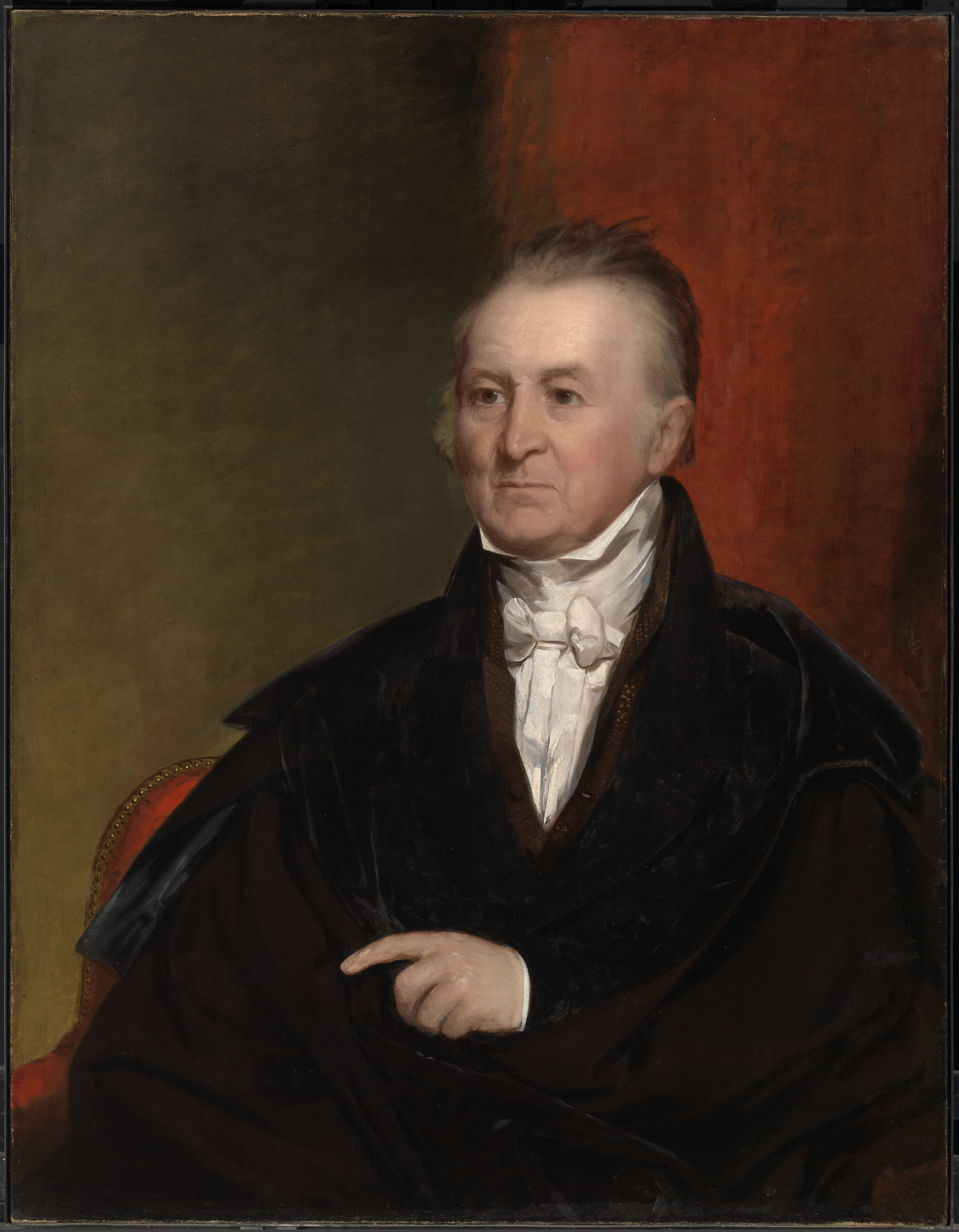
Harrison Gray Otis, portrait by Chester Harding

Sullivan supported harsh laws confiscating the property of Loyalists who fled the country or fought with the British, although he later took on as clients personal friends who were Loyalists seeking to recover their property. In his native Maine he had a mixed record, representing the state against large-scale land proprietors, but also taking work from the latter (who included some of the most powerful politicians in the state). His interest in the tangled difficulties surrounding land titles in Maine prompted him to write a seminal work on the subject in 1801, The History of Land Titles in Massachusetts.

The two cases with the highest profile that Sullivan prosecuted while attorney general were both criminal cases. In 1801 he prosecuted the Dedham murderer Jason Fairbanks, who had retained Federalist Harrison Gray Otis as his defense council. Fairbanks was convicted of murdering a local woman, but escaped after his conviction, and was eventually captured near the Canada–US border and hanged. Sullivan and Otis faced off again in 1807 in the sensational trial of Thomas Selfridge, accused of murdering Charles Austin. Selfridge, an older Federalist attorney, had been retained to assist in the collection of a debt from Austin's Republican father. In the politically charged atmosphere of the day in Boston, Selfridge, fearing for his own safety, had armed himself with a dueling pistol. The younger Austin had, apparently on his own initiative, sought to beat Selfridge with a cane, and Selfridge fatally shot him in the encounter. Selfridge was defended by a cadre of Federalist lawyers including Otis and Christopher Gore, and was acquitted of murder by a jury whose foreman was Patriot and Federalist Paul Revere.

Sullivan continued to take private legal work even while he served as attorney general. In a career spanning more than forty years, his law practice was among the largest and most successful in the state. He was an acknowledged expert on admiralty law, and is described by legal historian Charles Warren as one of the most important legal figures of the time in Massachusetts.

=== Maine–New Brunswick border commission ===
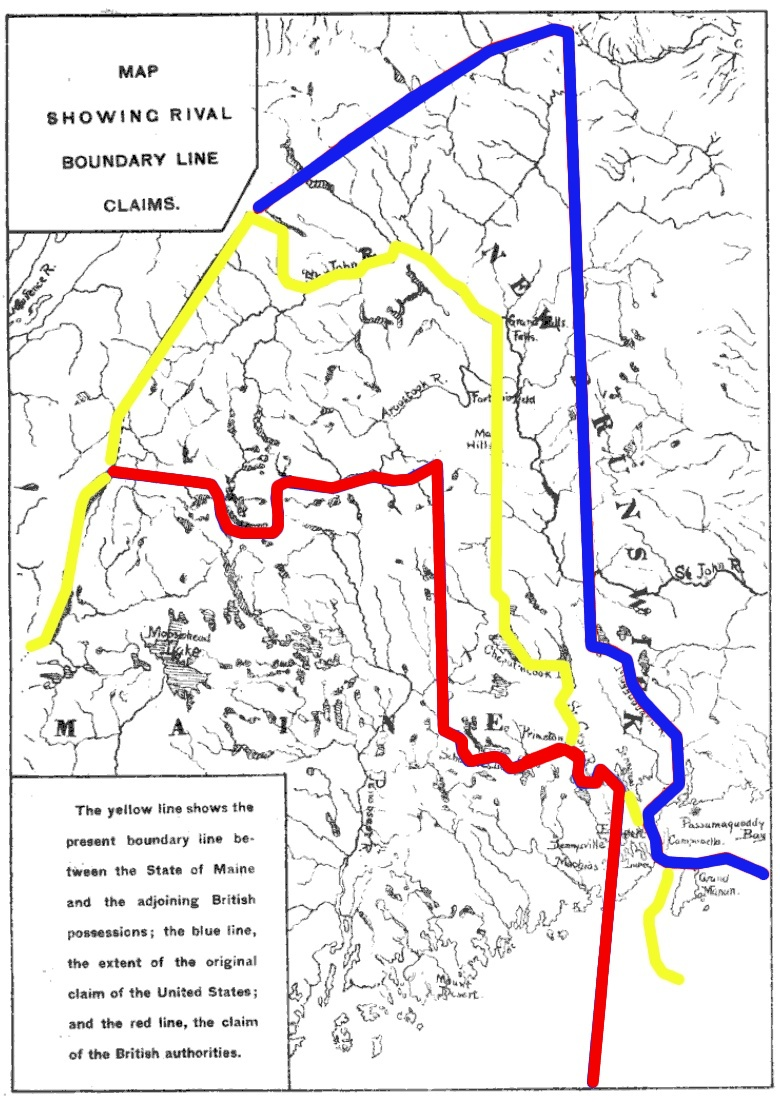
Map showing the competing boundary claims: the British claim in red, the American claim in blue, and the final (1842) border in yellow

In 1796 Sullivan was appointed by Secretary of State Timothy Pickering to be the United States agent to the binational commission established under the terms of the Jay Treaty to formalize the border between Maine and the British (now Canadian) province of New Brunswick. The southern portion of the border had been defined as the Saint Croix River in the 1783 Treaty of Paris, which ended the American Revolutionary War, but there was some question as to which river it actually was because the area was then sparsely peopled and poorly surveyed, and maps of the area contained conflicting references to the named river.

Sullivan's responsibility was to gather relevant maps and legal documents, and then present a legal case for the United States' claim for what the border should be. In addition to researching materials in Massachusetts archives, Sullivan spent a significant amount of time exploring the poorly surveyed and remote Passamaquoddy Bay, attempting to build a case that the Magaguadavic River was the river intended by the treaty negotiators. Which river it was hinged on the location of a 1604 French settlement on an island in the river, and the commissioners and agents explored the area and ordered surveys. The surveys located evidence of the settlement on Saint Croix Island, after which the commission fixed the southern portion of the border on what is now known as the Saint Croix River. (The disposition of some islands in the bay was not settled, and the northern portion of the border would not be fixed until the 1842 Webster-Ashburton Treaty.)

=== Governor ===
Sullivan received the Republican nomination for governor in 1797 and 1798, but lost to Federalist Increase Sumner (in 1798 by a landslide after the XYZ Affair lent strength to the Federalist cause). Republicanism eventually began gaining ground in Massachusetts, and Sullivan was again nominated in 1805 and 1806 for governor, losing both times to the popular incumbent Governor Caleb Strong. In 1806 the Republicans gained control of the Massachusetts legislature, which managed to very nearly deny Strong a narrow victory. With fewer than 200 votes in the balance, the Republican-controlled legislature scrutinized the returns in a partisan manner, discarding ballots that had misspelled Strong's name while retaining those that misspelled Sullivan's and performing tallies in ways that favored their candidate. This process concluded with a finding that Strong in fact lacked a majority of votes, which was what was then required to carry the election, as opposed to the modern plurality requirement. Strong's Federalist allies in the legislature were able to publicize the partisan nature of the analysis, resulting in a hostile public backlash. He was proclaimed the winner after further, less biased, analysis corrected the count in his favor. In 1807 Sullivan again faced Strong, but was this time decisively victorious, carrying the eastern counties (present-day Maine) by a wide margin amid a series of Republican victories throughout New England.

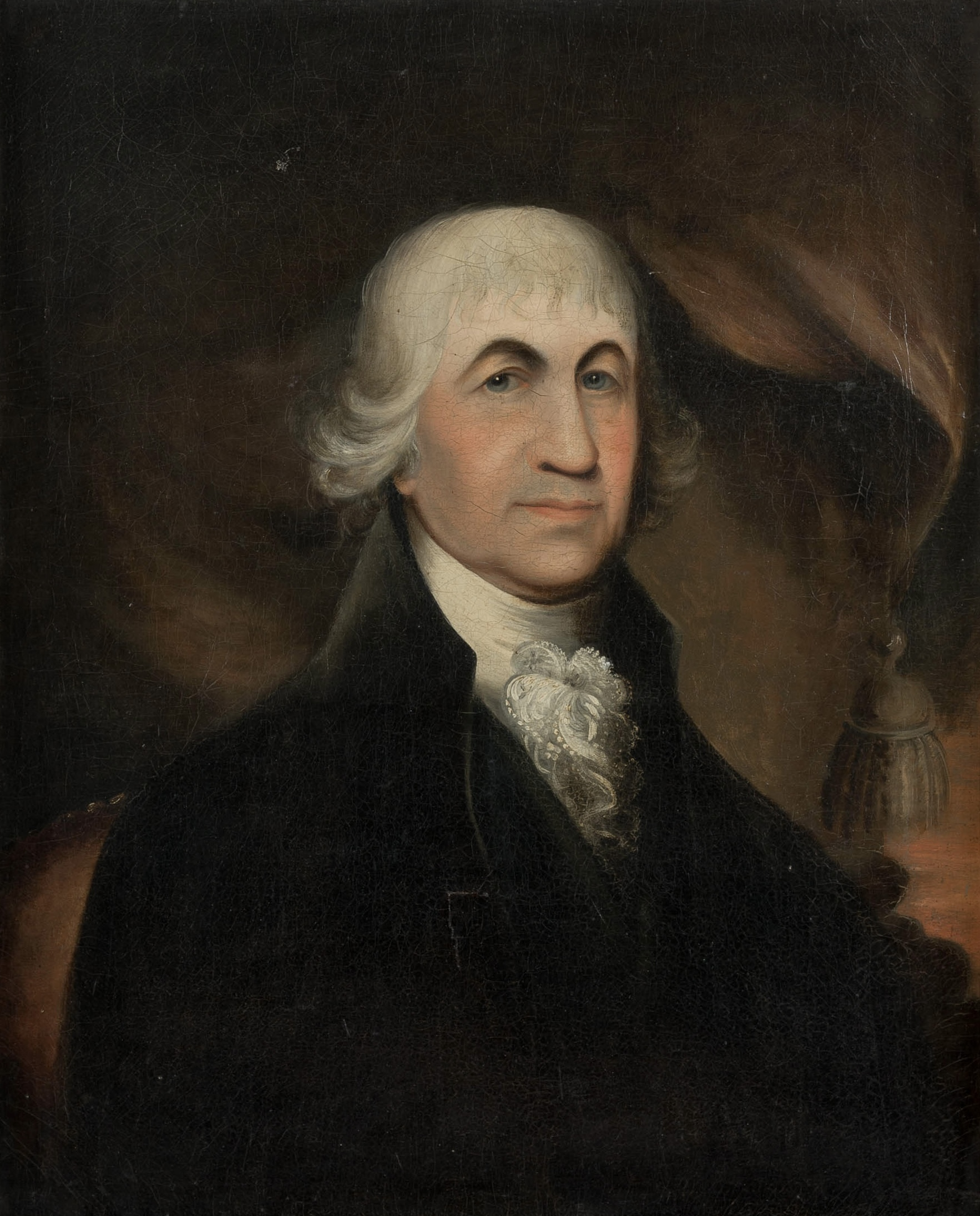
Caleb Strong, c. 1807 portrait

Although Sullivan sought in some ways to be a moderate voice in the highly partisan disagreements between Federalists and Republicans, he supported the policy of President Thomas Jefferson in embargoing trade with Great Britain and France, who were then embroiled in the Napoleonic Wars. The Embargo Act of 1807 had a significant negative impact on shipping interests based in Massachusetts ports, and Federalists sought to use this, and the threats of war emanating from the Jefferson administration, to unseat Sullivan in 1808. Federalist Senator Timothy Pickering wrote an open letter raising the specter of war and charging Jefferson with failing to publish critical documents in ongoing negotiations. He then asked Sullivan to formally send it to the state legislature, with the view that this would imply Sullivan's agreement with its content. Sullivan refused, after which Federalists used that fact to charge that Republicans generally were withholding damaging information. Sullivan's defense included letters by Senator John Quincy Adams countering the Federalist charges. While this was sufficient to ensure Sullivan's reelection in 1808, control of the legislature was returned to the Federalists. Republicans were unhappy with Sullivan's handling of the political attacks, and for his refusal to remove Federalists from patronage positions in the government.

The Federalist legislature immediately launched attacks on Sullivan and the Republicans, which Sullivan was not immediately able to respond to. In the spring of 1808, before the May opening of the legislature, Sullivan's health began to decline (epilepsy and an "organic disease of the heart"), so he was unable to seize the initiative. When he finally made his speech to the assembly, he failed to respond to the political aspects of the dispute, and called for national unity in dealing with outside interests. His warnings to Jefferson on the nature of the contentious disputes going on in the state were attributed by Jefferson to his declining mental state. Cognizant of Sullivan's precarious health, the Federalists sought a delay in electing a slate of electors for the Electoral College in the 1808 presidential election. Sullivan, who would have vetoed a slate of Federalist electors (as they were then chosen by the legislature and not by popular vote, the Federalist legislative majority would have assured this), he acquiesced in the hopes that elective actions in other states would moot the decision made in Massachusetts. Sullivan also came under criticism by political partisans on both sides for issuing large numbers of exemptions to the embargo, ostensibly to avoid civil strife in the event of a grain shortage.

When the legislature met in November, it rejected a proposal by Sullivan that popular elections determine the state's electoral slate, and instead chose a Federalist slate supporting Charles Cotesworth Pinckney for president in a vote boycotted by many Republicans. Based on widespread opinion that the Federalists were likely to lose the presidential election, Sullivan, his health failing, forwarded the electoral votes on to Congress. He died in office on December 10, 1808, aged 64, and was interred in Boston's Granary Burying Ground in a tomb shared by colonial governor Richard Bellingham.

== Business, economic development, and charity ==
In addition to his political and legal activities, Sullivan engaged in a wide variety of civic and charitable work. He was a founding member and the first president of the Massachusetts Historical Society, was a charter member of the American Academy of Arts and Sciences, and was involved with the Massachusetts Humane Society, the Society for the Propagation of the Faith among the Indians, and a charitable society that supported Congregationalist ministers.

Sullivan was a major moving force and leading director of the company that oversaw the Middlesex Canal (construction of which began in 1793). The canal connected the Merrimack River at present-day Lowell (then still East Chelmsford) to the port of Boston, ending roughly at Sullivan Square, which is named in his honor. He was deeply involved in the canal, purchasing the necessary land and supervising the construction. At the same time he was also involved in the company formed to build the first bridge across the Charles River connecting Boston to Cambridge, and was instrumental in the development of Boston's first public water supply, a wooden aqueduct from Jamaica Pond.

== Family and legacy ==
Sullivan's brothers were active participants in the Revolutionary War. John, Daniel, and Ebenezer, all served in the Continental Army. John served with some distinction until he retired from the army to enter New Hampshire politics in 1779; Ebenezer was captured in the Battle of The Cedars in 1776, and spent some time as a captive among the Mohawk, where he was subjected to torture; Daniel was also captured in action and died aboard a British prison ship. Sullivan, Maine is named for his brother Daniel, one of the early settlers of that area, and several places in New Hampshire are named for John. In 1808, while Sullivan was governor, a small fortification now known as Fort Sullivan was constructed in Eastport, Maine. Who it is named for is uncertain: one early Eastport historian states that John and James are both likely candidates, preferring John for his association with General Henry Dearborn, who ordered the fort's construction.

Sullivan and his first wife Hettie had nine children, two of whom died young, and one son who died in 1787 due to the hardships of militia service during Shays' Rebellion. Hettie died in 1786, and he afterward married Martha Langdon, the widowed sister of New Hampshire politician John Langdon.

Sullivan's enduring interest in Maine led him to write The History of the District of Maine (published in 1795), the first work to document that history. Maine historian Charles Clark writes that Sullivan's History, while neither thoroughly researched nor particularly well written, is an "un-self-conscious expression of romantic nationalism" that is "picturesque, romantic, [and] inspired". Sullivan also predicted that Maine would eventually separate from Massachusetts, because "it is so large and populous, and its situation so peculiar, that it cannot remain long" a part of the other state.

== Works ==
- Sullivan, James (1784). Strictures in the Rev. Mr. Thatcher's Pamphlet. Boston: Benjamin Edes and Sons.
- Sullivan, James (1795). The History of the District of Maine. Boston: I. Thomas and E. T. Andrews. OCLC 15730995.
- Sullivan, James (1801). The History of Land Titles in Massachusetts. Boston: I. Thomas and E. T. Andrews. OCLC 60728198.

== Notes ==
Party political offices
Preceded by Elbridge Gerry	Democratic-Republican nominee for Governor of Massachusetts; 1804, 1805, 1806, 1807, 1808	Succeeded by Levi Lincoln Sr.
Political offices
Preceded by Caleb Strong	Governor of Massachusetts; May 29, 1807 – December 10, 1808	Succeeded by Levi Lincoln Sr. as Acting Governor
Legal offices
Preceded by Robert Treat Paine	Attorney General of Massachusetts; 1790–1807	Succeeded by Barnabas Bidwell
Preceded by William Reed as Associate Justice of the Massachusetts Superior Court of Judicature	Associate Justice of the Massachusetts Supreme Judicial Court; 1776–1782	Succeeded by Increase Sumner
