= Levi Lincoln Sr. =

American revolutionary, lawyer and statesman (1749–1820)

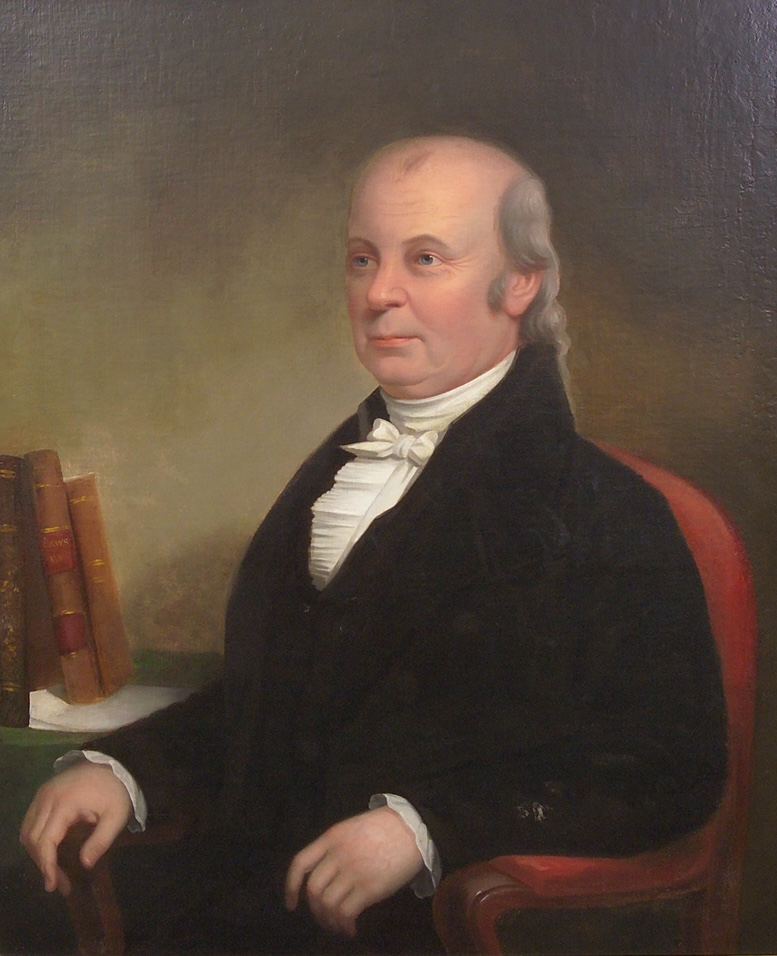
- Posthumous Portrait by James Sullivan Lincoln, 1865

Acting Governor of Massachusetts
- In office December 10, 1808 – May 1, 1809
- Preceded by: James Sullivan
- Succeeded by: Christopher Gore

7th Lieutenant Governor of Massachusetts
- In office May 29, 1807 – May 1, 1809
- Governor: James Sullivan
- Preceded by: Edward Robbins
- Succeeded by: David Cobb

4th United States Attorney General
- In office March 5, 1801 – March 3, 1805
- President: Thomas Jefferson
- Preceded by: Charles Lee
- Succeeded by: John Breckinridge

Acting United States Secretary of State
- In office March 5, 1801 – May 1, 1801
- President: Thomas Jefferson
- Preceded by: John Marshall
- Succeeded by: James Madison

Member of the U.S. House of Representatives from Massachusetts's 4th district
- In office December 15, 1800 – March 5, 1801
- Preceded by: Dwight Foster
- Succeeded by: Seth Hastings

Personal details
- Born: Levi Lincoln; May 15, 1749 Hingham, Massachusetts Bay, British America
- Died: April 14, 1820 (aged 70) Worcester, Massachusetts, U.S.
- Party: Democratic-Republican
- Spouse: Martha Waldo
- Children: 10, including Levi Jr. and Enoch
- Education: Harvard University (BA)

Military service
- Allegiance: United States
- Branch/service: Massachusetts militia
- Battles/wars: Siege of Boston

Levi Lincoln Sr. (May 15, 1749 – April 14, 1820) was an American revolutionary, lawyer, and statesman from Massachusetts. A Democratic-Republican, he served as Thomas Jefferson's first attorney general, and played a significant role in the events that led to the celebrated Marbury v. Madison court case. He served two terms as the lieutenant governor of Massachusetts, acting as governor for the remainder of Governor James Sullivan's term after his death in December 1808. Lincoln was unsuccessful in his bid to be elected governor in his own right in 1809.

Born in Hingham, Massachusetts, Lincoln was educated at Harvard College, and studied law with Joseph Hawley before establishing a law practice in Worcester, Massachusetts. He was active in local politics, and participated in the convention that drafted the Massachusetts Constitution in 1779. He supported Quock Walker, a former slave seeking confirmation of his freedom under that constitution in 1783. He entered national politics with his election to the United States House of Representatives in 1800, but was immediately tapped by Jefferson to become Attorney General. Lincoln served Jefferson as a consultant on the politics of New England, and was influential in the distribution of patronage in the region. He served on a commission that resolved claims emanating from the Yazoo land scandal in Georgia, and advised Jefferson on matters related to the Louisiana Purchase.

He returned to Massachusetts, where he remained politically active in the state. He established Republican dominance in Worcester, even though the state was dominated by Federalists. He was elected lieutenant governor under James Sullivan in 1807, but failed to win election in his own right in 1809 in a highly partisan election. He retired from politics in 1811, declining nomination to the Supreme Court because of his health.

== Early years ==
Lincoln was born in Hingham, Massachusetts, on May 15, 1749, to Enoch and Rachel (Fearing) Lincoln. His father first apprenticed him to a local blacksmith, but the boy's lack of interest in that business and clear interest in reading led to his eventual enrollment in Harvard College. He graduated in 1772, and studied law under Joseph Hawley in Northampton. When news of the Battles of Lexington and Concord reached Northampton, he volunteered for military service, but only served for a short time, marching with the local militia to Cambridge, where militia were besieging British-occupied Boston.

Lincoln did not stay long, and soon returned to Northampton, where he passed the bar. He established a practice in Worcester in 1775, where his business flourished because most of the Worcester lawyers had been Loyalist and had fled to Boston. From 1775 to 1781, he served as clerk of the court and probate judge of Worcester County, and served the town of Worcester in a variety of posts into the 1790s. He was elected in 1779 to the state convention that drafted the state constitution. During these years, Lincoln rose in prominence to become one of the largest landowners in Worcester. He was a charter member of the American Academy of Arts and Sciences in 1780.

Is not a law of nature that all men are equal and free. Is not the law of nature the law of God? Is not the law of God against slavery.

— Levi Lincoln in the Quock Walker case

In 1781, Lincoln was one of the lawyers (another was Northampton lawyer and future governor Caleb Strong) who worked on a series of legal cases surrounding Quock Walker, a former slave seeking to claim his freedom. One of the cases, Commonwealth of Massachusetts v. Nathaniel Jennison, firmly established that slavery was incompatible with the new state constitution. Although the decision by Justice William Cushing was based on the state constitution's language "all men are born free and equal", Lincoln in his arguments had instead appealed to natural law: "Is it not a law of nature that all men are equal and free?" Debate raged on and seventy-five years after the court's decision T.R.R. Cobb's treatise attempted to refute the proposition that slavery was contrary to natural law.

Lincoln was also elected to the Continental Congress in 1781, but declined to serve. Lincoln was elected to the Massachusetts House of Representatives in 1796, and to both the House and State Senate in 1797; he chose to sit in the Senate.

== United States Attorney General ==
At first a weak Federalist, Lincoln became more closely associated with the Jeffersonian Democratic-Republican Party. He repeatedly ran for election to the United States House of Representatives in three consecutive elections in the 1790s (1794, 1796, and 1798), losing each time to Federalist Dwight Foster. Foster was elected to the Senate in a special election in early 1800, opening his House seat; after a series of special elections (in most of which Lincoln won a plurality but not the required majority of votes), Lincoln was finally elected to the seat in December 1800. His service was brief: on March 5, 1801, President Jefferson appointed him attorney general, an office he held until March 1805. Jefferson's choice of Lincoln was supported by his close advisor and eventual Treasury Secretary, Albert Gallatin, who described Lincoln as "a good lawyer, a fine scholar, a man of great discretion and sound judgment" and a "sound and decided Republican".

Since the post of Attorney General was then part-time, Lincoln spent most of his time in that office in Worcester, advancing the Democratic-Republican cause. In addition to distributing federal patronage dollars, he frequently reported to Jefferson on political sentiment in New England, and advocated for Republican positions in the newspapers. In 1801, he founded the National Aegis, a newspaper dedicated to advancing Republican arguments and countering Federalist positions printed in other Massachusetts publications. During his years as Attorney General, the Democratic-Republicans successfully gained control of most of Worcester's political establishment, even while much of Massachusetts (including Worcester County) remained generally Federalist. Lincoln was regularly the subject of unflattering partisan newspaper reporting, as well as sermons delivered by influential Congregational ministers. The negative sermonizing prompted Lincoln to publish a pamphlet entitled Letters to the People, by a Farmer in 1802, in which he lambasted the Federalists for politicizing the clergy. Reverend William Bentley observed that Lincoln's criticism was a serious blow: "[N]ever did the Clergy suffer a more serious diminution of their influence and of their power."

=== Participation in Marbury v. Madison ===
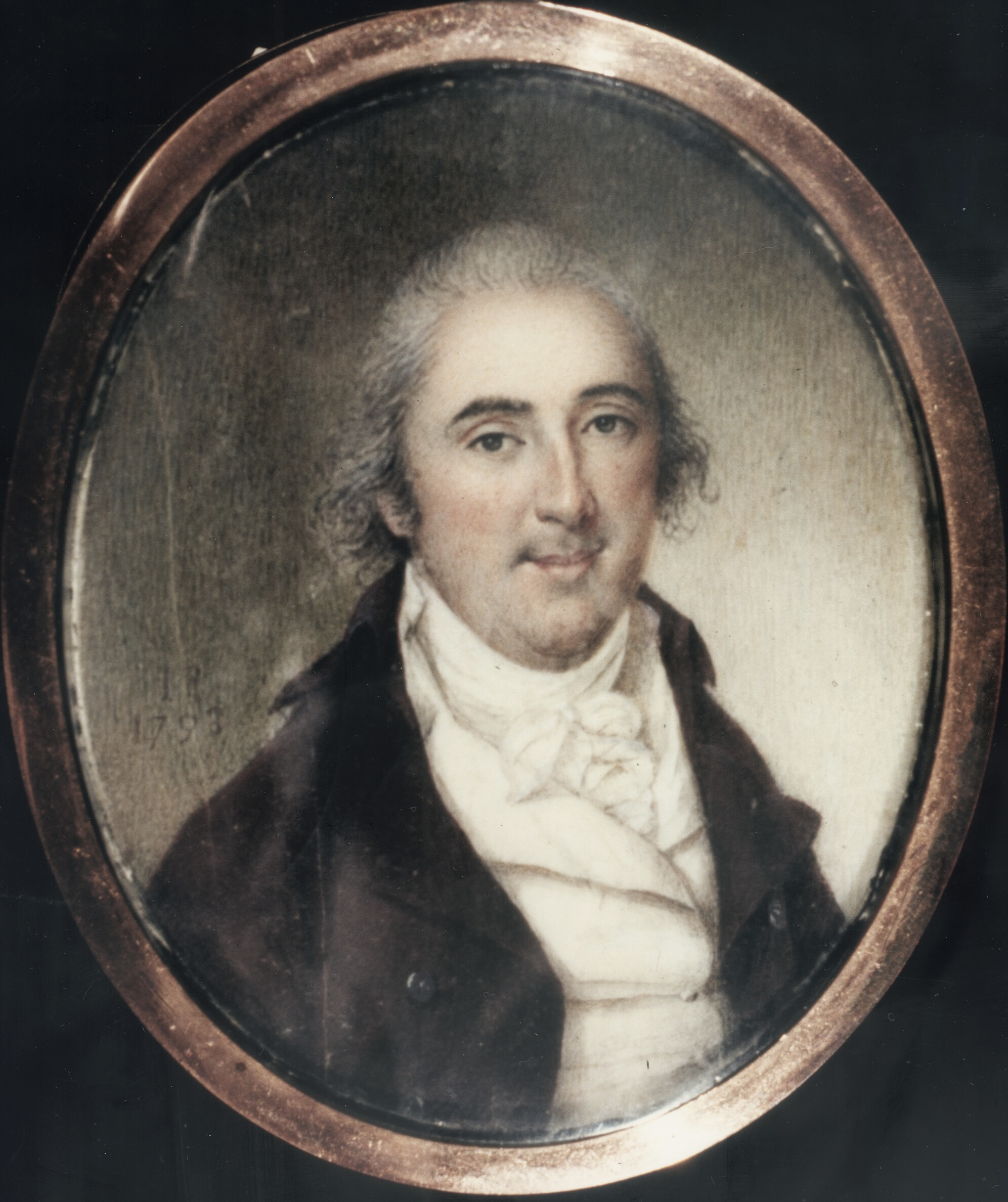
William Marbury, plaintiff in Marbury v. Madison

When Jefferson took office, he moved as quickly as possible to fill his cabinet positions. Although he had asked James Madison to be his secretary of state, Madison did not arrive in Washington until May 1, 1801, because of illness. In the interim, Jefferson asked Lincoln to act temporarily as Secretary of State, which he did from March 5, 1801, until Madison assumed his duties on May 2. During this time, Lincoln was involved in actions that led to the celebrated Marbury v. Madison case concerning judicial review. In the later days of the John Adams administration, the President issued a large number of commissions, some of which had not been delivered by John Marshall, his Secretary of State, at the time Jefferson assumed office. Jefferson ordered Lincoln (in his capacity as acting Secretary of State) and then Madison (after his assumption of the position) not to deliver these commissions.

Some intended recipients of the commissions, William Marbury among them, filed a suit in the United States Supreme Court to compel their delivery. In his role as Attorney General, Lincoln was present at the preliminary hearing on the case, representing Madison. When the case was heard (ironically by a court headed by John Marshall, the preparer of the commissions), Lincoln was called to the stand by Marbury's attorney, former Attorney General Charles Lee. Rather than answer Lee's questions, Lincoln invoked both executive privilege and the Fifth Amendment, requesting the opportunity to consider whether or not to answer the questions. The justices granted him time but made it clear that he must answer the questions or clearly justify his objections to specific written questions. When Lincoln returned the next day, he answered all of the posed questions but one. Asked "[w]hat had been done with the commissions," Lincoln refused to answer directly, only stating that he did not know if Madison ever received them. The opposition press criticized Lincoln for the performance, writing that he "was asked a simple question, but could not answer it until they gave it to him in writing,... and then he made out to remember that he had forgot all about it".

=== Georgia land scandal ===
During the 1790s, politicians and land speculators in Georgia perpetrated fraudulent and corrupt land sales in an area that is now a large portion of Alabama and Mississippi. When the fraud was exposed in 1795, there was significant public outcry, and the Georgia legislation authorizing the sales was repealed. This led to a host of claims and litigation, since in a number of cases, land was afterward resold to unsuspecting third parties. President Jefferson eventually established a three-person commission to resolve conflicting claims arising from the fraud. Lincoln was appointed to this commission, which developed legislation to resolve the issue. Eventually approved by Congress, Georgia's claims to the area were extinguished and some land was reserved to resolve other outstanding claims. The commission was also responsible for documenting and reporting on the nature and extent of the fraud, activities in which Lincoln was heavily involved.

=== Foreign policy ===
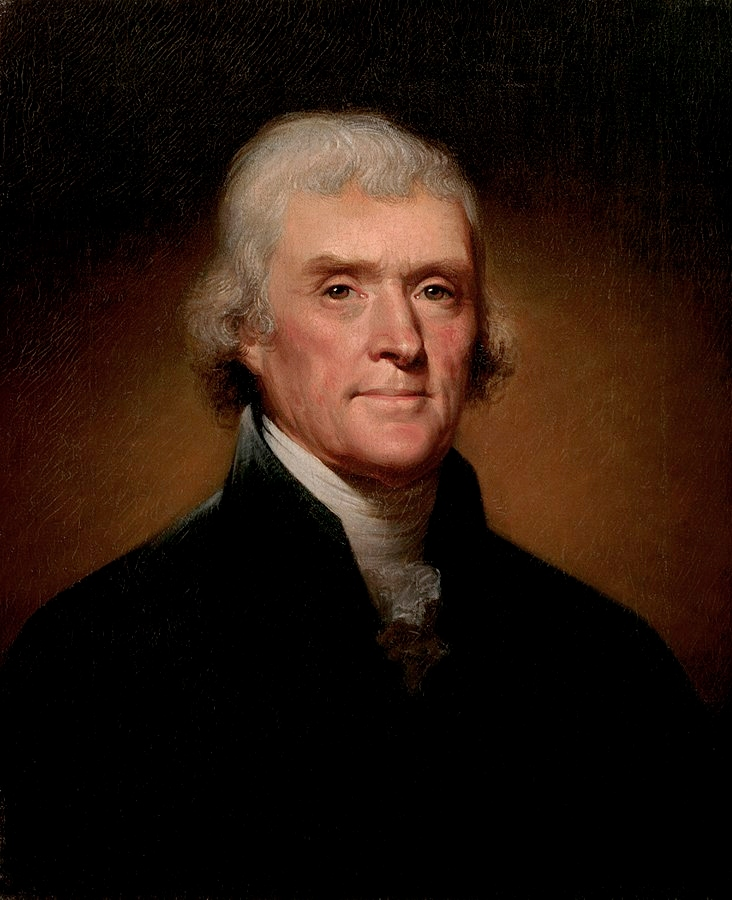
Thomas Jefferson by Rembrandt Peale (1800)

Prior to Jefferson's presidency, the United States had paid tribute to a number of Arab states in the Mediterranean to prevent attacks on its shipping. By the time Jefferson assumed office, the United States Navy had been developed to the point where it might adequately defend American shipping interests. Jefferson consequently refused to pay tribute in 1801 to Yusuf Karamanli, the ruler of Tripoli, after which the Tripolitans began attacking and seizing American merchant vessels. In a cabinet discussion held in early 1801 to formulate a response, it was suggested that the President declare war on Tripoli. Lincoln pointed out that only Congress had the authority to declare war, but the rest of the cabinet was intent on taking some sort of action. The matter was tabled until May 1801, when the cabinet voted to send a naval squadron to the area to defend the country's merchant interests. Jefferson never asked for or received from Congress a formal war declaration against the Barbary states.

When Napoleon sought to sell the French territory of Louisiana to the United States in 1802, Jefferson was concerned over the political consequences of acquiring a large tract of what was perceived then as predominantly Southern territory, as well as a possible lack of constitutional authority to make the purchase. To circumvent these concerns, Lincoln made a novel proposal that the territory could be acquired by expanding an existing state's borders, effecting a purchase that would not require a constitutional amendment. This proposal was rejected by Jefferson and his other advisors, and the purchase was ultimately made in spite of the standing constitutional question.

== Massachusetts political offices ==
In 1804, Lincoln informed Jefferson that, for personal reasons, he would leave the post of Attorney General. His resignation became official on March 3, 1805.

In Massachusetts, Lincoln once again became active in state politics. He was a member of the Governor's Council in 1806, and was nominated the following year as a candidate for lieutenant governor. The Democratic-Republicans nominated James Sullivan as the gubernatorial candidate, but because the moderate Sullivan was distrusted by radicals in the party, they were able to secure Lincoln's place on the ticket. Federalists seized on the divisions in the opposition, claiming that Sullivan was a pawn, and that he would soon be replaced by the "Jacobin Lincoln—a man so little known, and so unpopular where known, that they dare not risk as a candidate for the office he aspires to." The election was a sweep for Lincoln's party, which gained control over the entire state government. Sullivan and Lincoln were reelected in 1808, but Sullivan died in December 1808, and Lincoln became acting governor. From these positions, he continued to actively support the policies of President Jefferson, despite their growing unpopularity with the generally Federalist Massachusetts population and business interests.

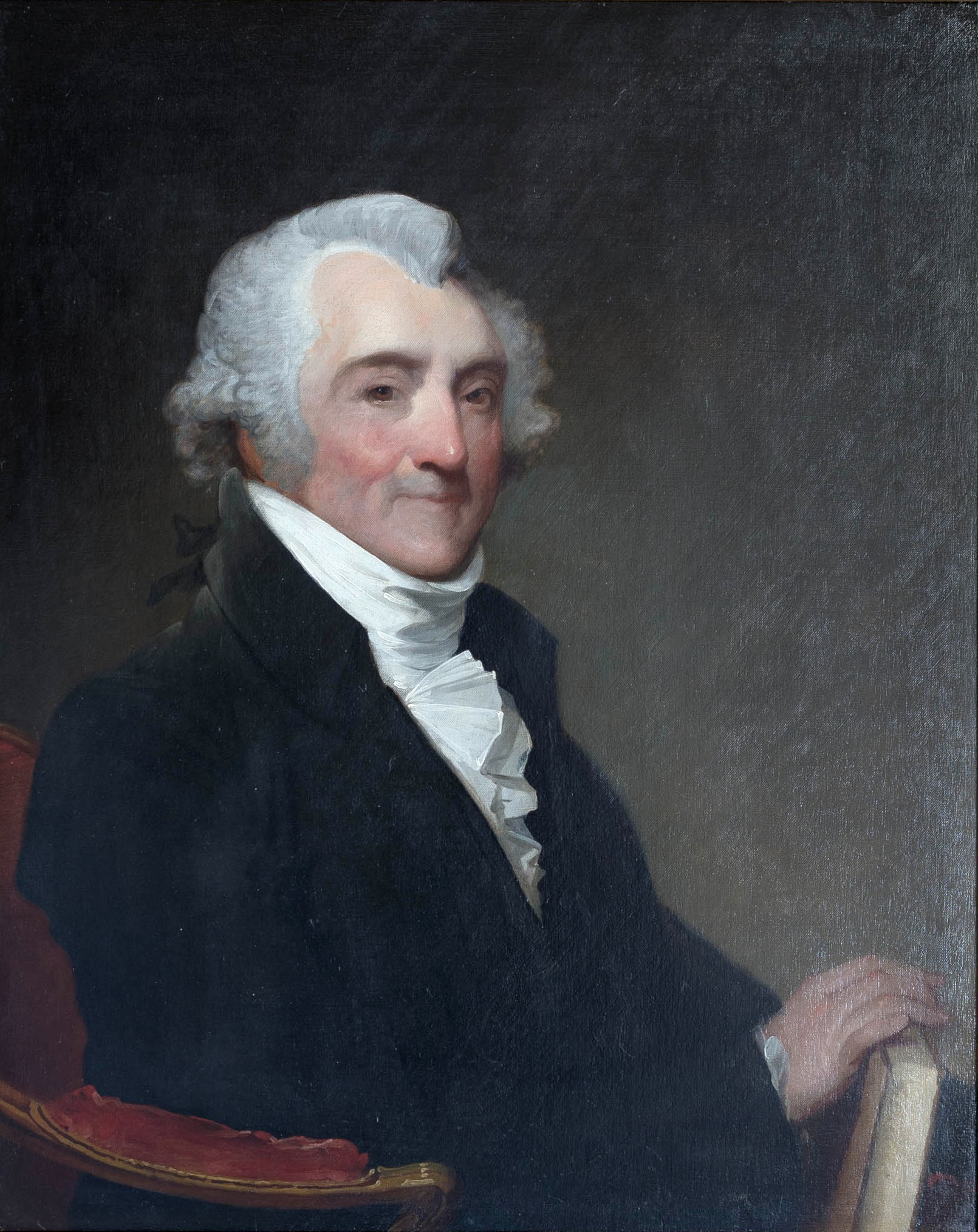
James Sullivan by Gilbert Stuart, 1807

Lincoln ran for election as governor in his own right in 1809, but he was perceived by moderate Federalists as overly partisan and lacked the charisma of Sullivan. His support for Jefferson's economic policy, particularly that of embargoing trade with Great Britain and France (who were then embroiled in the Napoleonic Wars) was costly. Federalists, who had regained control of the Massachusetts legislature in 1808, attacked his statements in support of Jefferson, and he lost the election to Christopher Gore, amid a complete Federalist takeover of the Massachusetts government (the outgoing Jefferson administration's repeal of the embargo before the election notwithstanding).

Lincoln was again chosen to serve on the Governor's Council in 1810 and 1811. In 1811, President James Madison offered him a position as an Associate Justice of the Supreme Court, but he declined on account of failing eyesight. Lincoln retired to his Worcester estate, where he took an active interest in farming; his pursuit of scientific interests related to agriculture were widely recognized, and he served as the first president of the Worcester Agricultural Society, founded in 1818.

Lincoln was additionally a founding member of the American Antiquarian Society along with one of his sons Levi Lincoln Jr. in 1812.

Lincoln died in Worcester on April 14, 1820. His original burial site is not documented in the family genealogy, but he was eventually reinterred at Worcester Rural Cemetery after its establishment in 1838.

== Family and legacy ==
Lincoln married Martha Waldo (1761–1828) of Worcester in 1781, with whom he had ten children (three of whom died young). His eldest child, Levi Jr., and a younger son Enoch both followed their father into politics: Levi Jr. became one of the longest-serving governors of Massachusetts, and Enoch was Governor of Maine.

When Lincoln moved to Worcester, he acquired a large tract of land near what is now the downtown area of the city. This land was mostly developed by his heirs, and is part of the Lincoln Estate-Elm Park Historic District. Worcester's Gov. Levi Lincoln House is named for Levi Jr. As a consequence of the family's prominence in the city, there are a number of landmarks (streets, buildings, and parks) in Worcester bearing the Lincoln name.

Lincoln was distantly related to Abraham Lincoln, sharing a common ancestor with the sixteenth U.S. president in Samuel Lincoln, who had settled in Hingham, Massachusetts, in the 17th century.

== Notes ==
Party political offices
Preceded by James Sullivan	Democratic-Republican nominee for Governor of Massachusetts; 1809	Succeeded by Elbridge Gerry
U.S. House of Representatives
Preceded by Dwight Foster	Member of the U.S. House of Representatives from Massachusetts's 4th congressional district 1800–1801	Succeeded by Seth Hastings
Legal offices
Preceded by Charles Lee	United States Attorney General; 1801–1805	Succeeded by John Breckinridge
Political offices
Preceded by John Marshall	United States Secretary of State; Acting; 1801	Succeeded by James Madison
Preceded by Edward Robbins	Lieutenant Governor of Massachusetts; 1807–1809	Succeeded by David Cobb
Preceded by James Sullivan	Governor of Massachusetts; Acting; 1808–1809	Succeeded by Christopher Gore
