= Christopher Gore =

American Federalist politician (1758–1827)

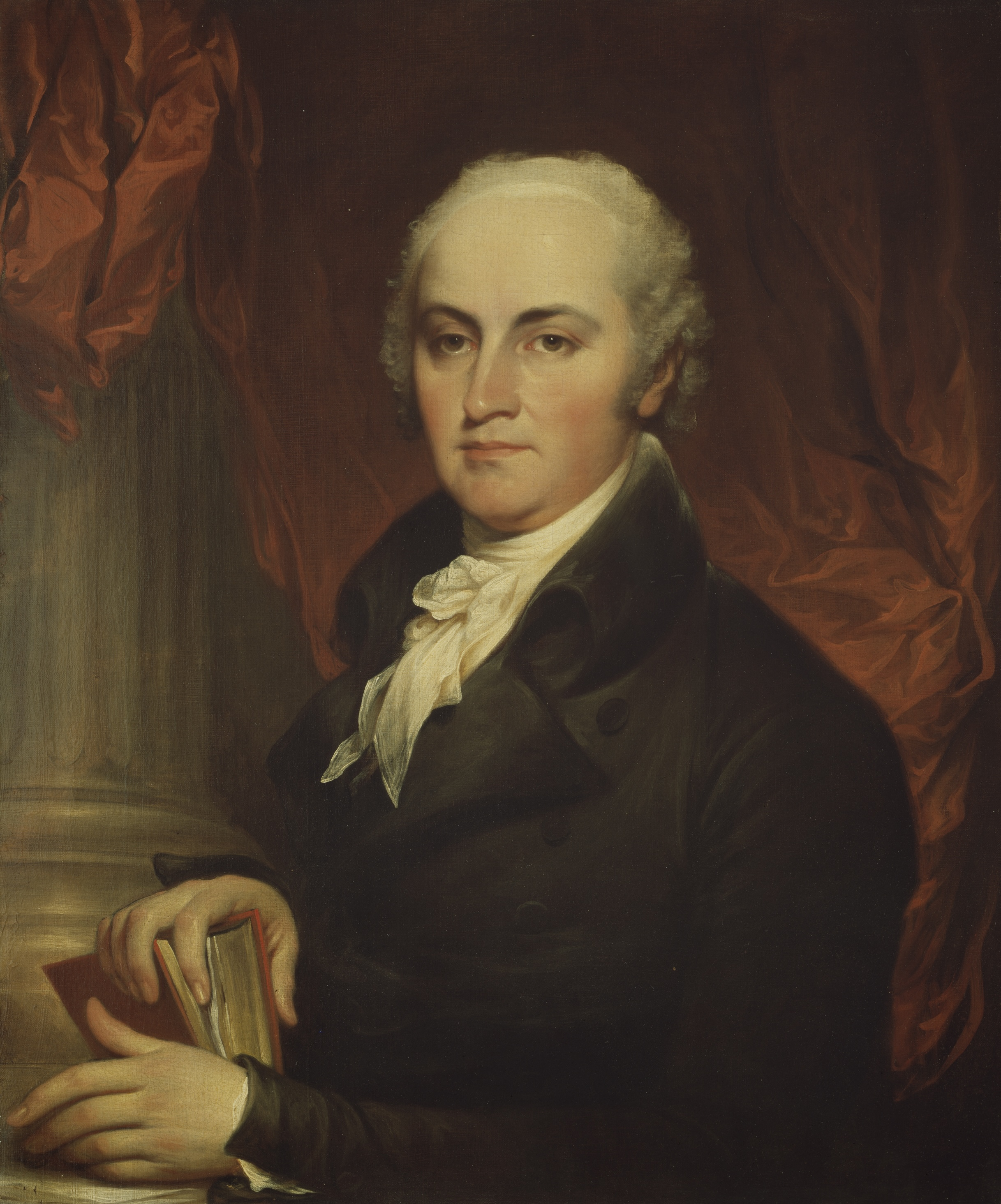
- Portrait by John Trumbull, c. 1802–1804

United States Senator from Massachusetts
- In office May 5, 1813 – May 30, 1816
- Preceded by: James Lloyd
- Succeeded by: Eli P. Ashmun

8th Governor of Massachusetts
- In office May 1, 1809 – June 10, 1810
- Lieutenant: David Cobb
- Preceded by: Levi Lincoln Sr. (acting)
- Succeeded by: Elbridge Gerry

United States Attorney for the District of Massachusetts
- In office 1789–1796
- Preceded by: Position created
- Succeeded by: Harrison Gray Otis

Member of the Massachusetts Senate
- In office 1788

Personal details
- Born: September 21, 1758 Boston, Province of Massachusetts Bay, British America
- Died: March 1, 1827 (aged 68) Waltham, Massachusetts, U.S.
- Party: Federalist
- Spouse: Rebecca Amory Payne
- Education: Harvard College
- Profession: Lawyer, politician

Military service
- Branch/service: Continental Army
- Battles/wars: American Revolutionary War

Christopher Gore (September 21, 1758 – March 1, 1827) was a prominent Massachusetts lawyer, Federalist politician, and U.S. diplomat. Born into a family divided by the American Revolution, Gore sided with the victorious Patriots, established a successful law practice in Boston, and built a fortune by purchasing Revolutionary government debts at a discount and receiving full value for them from the government.

Gore entered politics in 1788, serving briefly in the Massachusetts legislature before being appointed U.S. District Attorney for Massachusetts. He was then appointed by President George Washington to a diplomatic commission dealing with maritime claims in Great Britain. He returned to Massachusetts in 1804 and reentered state politics, running unsuccessfully for governor several times before winning in 1809. He served one term, losing to Democratic-Republican Elbridge Gerry in 1810. He was appointed to the US Senate by Governor Caleb Strong in 1813, where he led opposition to the War of 1812.

Gore invested his fortune in a variety of businesses, including important infrastructure projects such as the Middlesex Canal and a bridge across the Charles River. He was a major investor in the early textile industry, funding the Boston Manufacturing Company and the Merrimack Manufacturing Company, whose business established the city of Lowell, Massachusetts. Gore was involved in a variety of charitable causes, and was a major benefactor of Harvard College, where the first library was named in his honor. His palatial mansion in Waltham, Massachusetts, now known as Gore Place, is one of the finest extant examples of Federal architecture, and has been declared a National Historic Landmark.

== Early years ==
Christopher Gore was born in Boston, Province of Massachusetts Bay, on September 21, 1758, one of many children of Frances and John Gore, a successful merchant and artisan. He was the youngest of their three sons to survive to adulthood. He attended Boston Latin School, and entered Harvard College at the young age of thirteen. At the outset of the American Revolutionary War and the siege of Boston in 1775, Harvard's buildings were occupied by the Continental Army, and Gore temporarily continued his studies in Bradford until Harvard could resume operations in Concord. While at Harvard, Gore participated in a speaking club and formed significant lifelong friendships with Rufus King and John Trumbull.

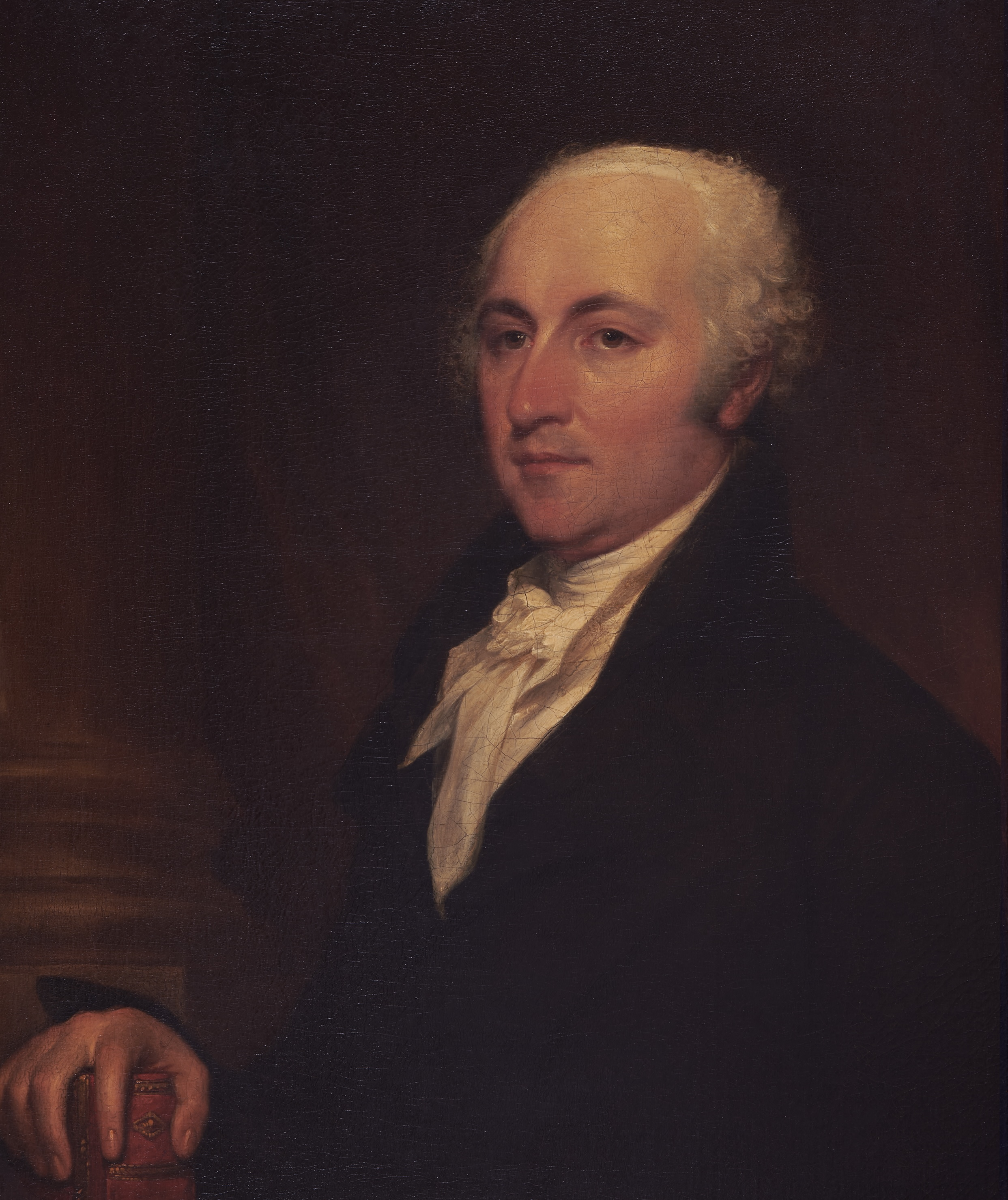
Rufus King became a lifelong friend of Gore's while they were at Harvard.

Gore graduated in 1776, and promptly enlisted in the Continental artillery regiment of his brother-in-law Thomas Crafts, where he served as a clerk until 1778. The Gore family was divided by the war: Gore's father was a Loyalist who left Boston when the British Army evacuated the city in March 1776. Gore was consequently called upon to support his mother and three sisters, who remained in Boston. In 1779, Gore successfully petitioned the state for the remaining family's share of his father's seized assets.

== Early legal career ==
After his military service Gore studied law with John Lowell, and was admitted to the bar in 1778 after a comparatively brief tutelage. Gore's law practice flourished, in part because many Loyalist lawyers had fled Massachusetts. Gore's clients included Loyalists seeking to recover some of their assets, as well as London-based British merchants with claims to pursue. His briefs were generally well-reasoned, and he was seen as a successful trial lawyer.

Gore grew his fortune by investing carefully in revolutionary currency and bonds. The securities he purchased were paper that had been given to Continental Army soldiers in lieu of pay, which they often sold at a steep discount. One batch of securities he purchased, for instance, cost him about $3,700 but had a face value of $25,000. In 1785 he married Rebecca Amory Payne, daughter of a wealthy merchant, maritime insurer, and director of the Bank of Massachusetts. The couple were known for their social graces and became prominent members of Boston society.

In 1786 Gore became concerned about a rise in anti-lawyer sentiment in Massachusetts. Grievances over harsh policies pursued by Governor James Bowdoin blossomed into Shays' Rebellion, which required militia action to crush in 1787. Gore was one of several high-profile lawyers assigned to defend participants in the rebellion (included in this group were Theodore Sedgwick, Caleb Strong, James Sullivan, Levi Lincoln Sr., and Thomas Dawes). Although many rebels were ultimately convicted, a large number received amnesty. In 1788, Gore was elected a delegate to the 1789 Massachusetts convention that ratified the United States Constitution. His election was contested because Boston, where he lived, was at the time more inclined toward state power. Gore nonetheless was strongly Federalist, urging support of the new Constitution.

== Legislator, banker, and speculator ==
In 1788 Gore was elected to the Massachusetts House of Representatives. He took a leading role in adopting the state's rules for actions required of it by the new federal constitution. By his proposal the legislature decided that presidential electors would be chosen by a joint session. He also proposed that the state House and Senate agree by separate votes on choices for the United States Senate, a process that would significantly reduce popular input to the choice. His choice was ultimately rejected in favor of a process whereby the House selected a slate of candidates, from which the Senate would choose one. In 1789 Gore decided to stand for reelection, but lost, owing to strong anti-nationalist fervor in Boston at the time. He managed to win a seat later, when a special election was held after resignations opened several seats.

Gore's financial speculations in the late 1780s significantly multiplied his wealth. In 1788 he and Andrew Craigie, a Boston businessman who had retained Gore for legal services, entered into a secret agreement to purchase Continental securities with a face value of $100,000 in a speculative bid that their value would rise. By late October of that year, the pair had met this goal: Gore had purchased $90,000 worth of paper for about $20,000, and encouraged Craigie to purchase more than the $11,000 he had acquired if his funding would allow for it. Gore also purchased Massachusetts war-related debts, and lobbied Massachusetts Congressmen for the U.S. government to assume those as well.

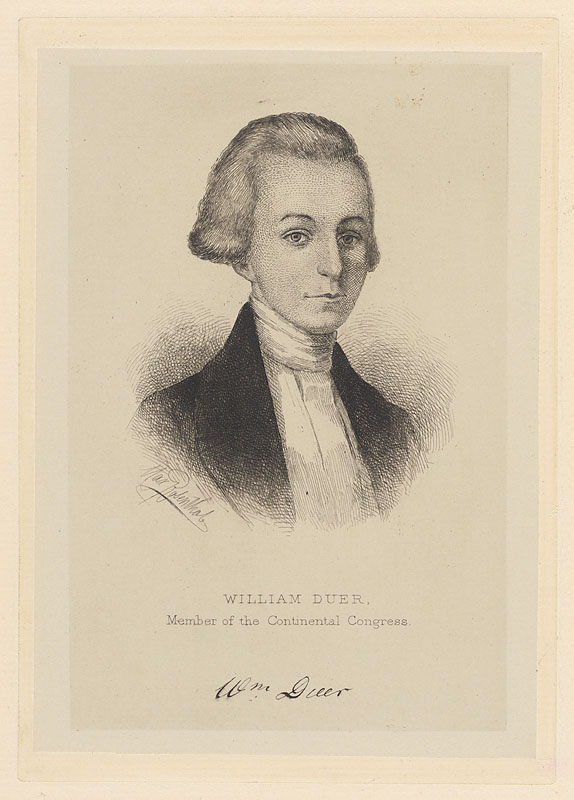
Gore's business partner William Duer

Gore's windfall was realized when in 1790 the United States Congress, acting on a proposal made by Alexander Hamilton and supported by Gore's friend Rufus King, passed legislation that exchanged Continental and state paper for new U.S. paper at face value. Not only did Gore win on this exchange, but the paper he received appreciated in value before he sold it. The exact amount he made is unclear from the surviving documents: John Quincy Adams wrote that Gore's speculations made him the wealthiest lawyer in the country.

The success of Gore's speculations prompted him to enter a partnership with Craigie, William Duer and Daniel Parker in an attempt to acquire U.S. foreign debt obligations on favorable terms. Parker was a business partner of Craigie's, and Duer was an influential New York businessman and Treasury Department official whose lavish lifestyle impressed Gore. The partnership promoted sales of U.S. lands in Europe, and sought to acquire U.S. obligations to France. Although Gore sank $10,000 into this venture, it failed: more powerful and experienced Dutch bankers outmaneuvered the Americans. Gore also engaged in other ventures with these partners, but apparently carefully stayed with financial speculations, and avoided the partners' less successful land ventures.

Much of Gore's financial activity was mediated through the Bank of Massachusetts, where his father-in-law was a director. Gore himself was elected to its board in 1785, when he also became a shareholder. During his time on the board the bank tightened its regulations on loan repayments, a move that improved the stability of its capital. Gore used the bank for most of his personal deposits, but also drew on lines of credit for as much as several thousand dollars. The bank shares he held paid relatively high dividends until 1791, when the bank received serious competition from the First Bank of the United States.

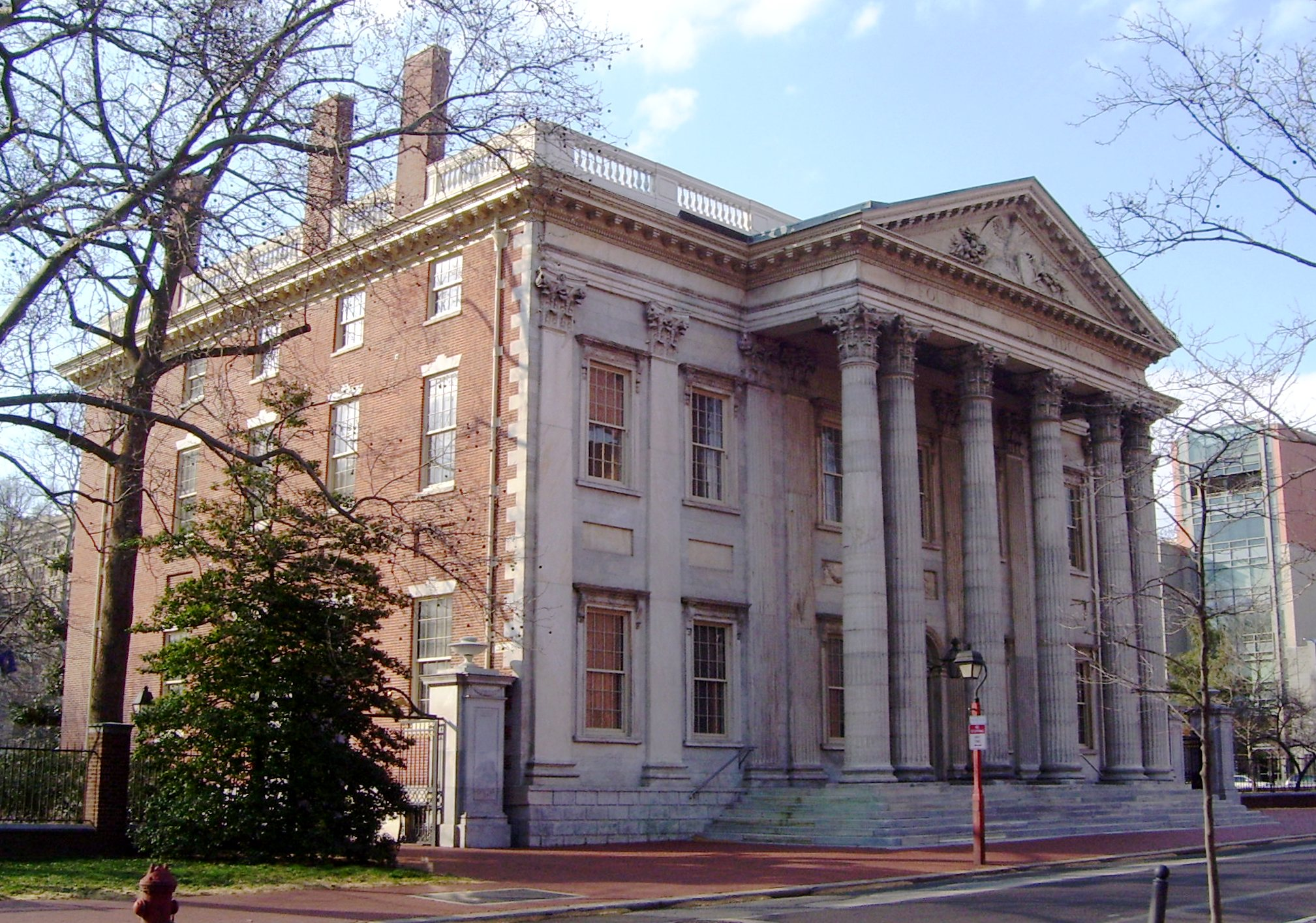
The First Bank of the United States in Philadelphia

The Bank of the United States was established by Alexander Hamilton to provide stable banking services on a national scale, and sought to open a branch in Boston. Hamilton recruited heavily in the Bank of Massachusetts, and Gore decided to make the move. He sold his shares in the Massachusetts bank, and became a director of the Boston branch of the U.S. Bank. He also purchased 200 shares in the new bank, a relatively large investment. Gore was influential in making hiring decisions for the branch, and sought to merge state-chartered banks into the organization, arguing that only a nationally chartered bank could provide consistent and stable service. Gore resigned from the board in 1794, citing the demands of his law practice.

Gore's financial successes enabled him to join the elite society of Boston. In 1789 he purchased a large mansion on fashionable Bowdoin Square, and also bought a country estate in Waltham that grew over time to 300 acres (120 ha). He had a house built on the estate, most of which he operated as a gentleman farmer. He and other similarly situated Federalists formed the Massachusetts Society for Promoting Agriculture, of which he served as a trustee for several years; the organization was not seen as significantly contributing to advances in agriculture.

== District attorney and diplomat ==
In 1789 President George Washington appointed Gore the first United States Attorney for Massachusetts as a reward for his support. Gore controversially refused to resign from the state legislature, arguing that the state constitution's prohibitions against holding multiple offices did not apply to federal posts. He eventually resigned the legislative seat under protest because of pressure from his fellow legislators.

Gore served as district attorney until 1796. His principal matter of concern was the enforcement of U.S. neutrality with respect to the French Revolutionary Wars. He attempted several times to prosecute the French consul in Boston, Antoine Duplaine, for arming and operating privateers out of the Port of Boston, but he was stymied by local juries that sympathized with the French. Duplaine was eventually expelled on orders from President George Washington based on evidence provided by Gore.

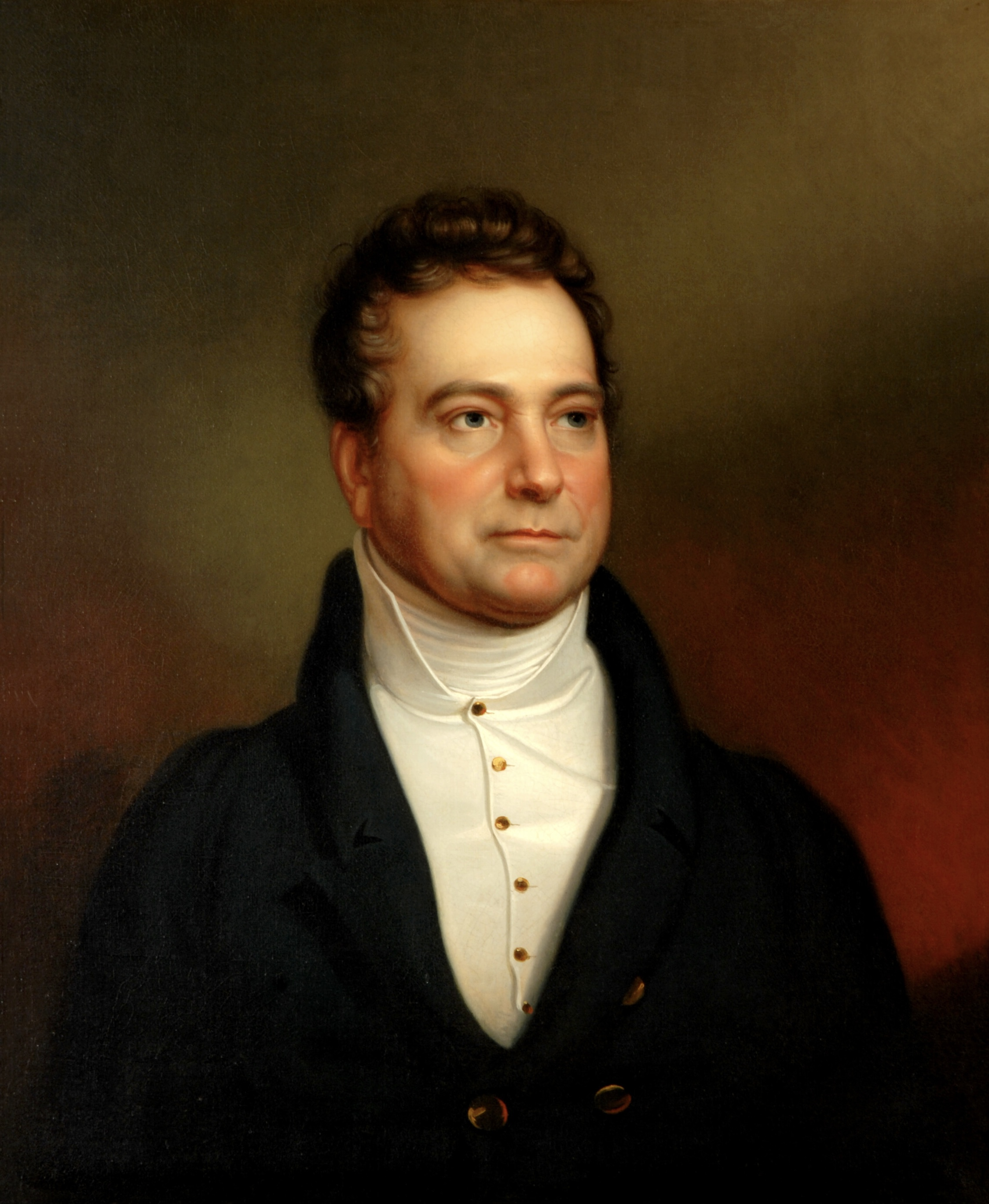
William Pinkney served as Gore's cocommissioner in England

Gore also promoted anti-French sentiment with political writings in Massachusetts newspapers. Writing under the pseudonym "Manlius", he denounced the formation of "Democratic Societies" formed to oppose Federalist policy and support pro-French positions. He suggested to President Washington that someone be sent to England to negotiate with the British. John Jay traveled to London in 1794 and negotiated the Jay Treaty, whose ratification Gore vocally supported. Although Gore was hostile to French policy, he was on friendly terms with individual Frenchmen: he hosted the future French statesman Talleyrand when he visited the U.S.

In 1796 Washington appointed him as a commissioner representing the United States to handle maritime claims under the terms the Jay Treaty. As a result, the Gores moved to England that year, establishing a residence in the fashionable Hyde Park area. The commission was established to arbitrate claims emanating from British seizures of American vessels and cargoes, and from British claims relating to violations of American neutrality in the ongoing French Revolutionary Wars. It consisted of three Americans (Gore, William Pinkney, and John Trumbull) and two British commissioners (John Nicoll and Nicholas Astley); Trumbull was chosen by the other four because he was deemed to sufficiently "fair-minded" to cast deciding votes in the event of disagreements. That year he was also elected a Fellow of the American Academy of Arts and Sciences.

Although Gore was well received by the British establishment, the work suffered from what Gore called a "tediousness of process", and he considered requesting a transfer in 1798. In 1800 it ground to a halt because another board established by the treaty to resolve outstanding Revolutionary War claims against the United States had not yet met, and the British stopped the claims processing until resolution of the other issues got underway. Gore used this break to briefly return to America and assess the condition of his Waltham estate, where the house had been largely destroyed by fire in 1799. After his return to London, with the commission work still stopped, he and Rebecca embarked on a tour of Europe. They visited the Netherlands, Belgium, and Switzerland, and spent six months in Paris. During this trip, and later ones in England and Scotland, they took note of the architecture of country estates, and began planning a new house for their Waltham property.

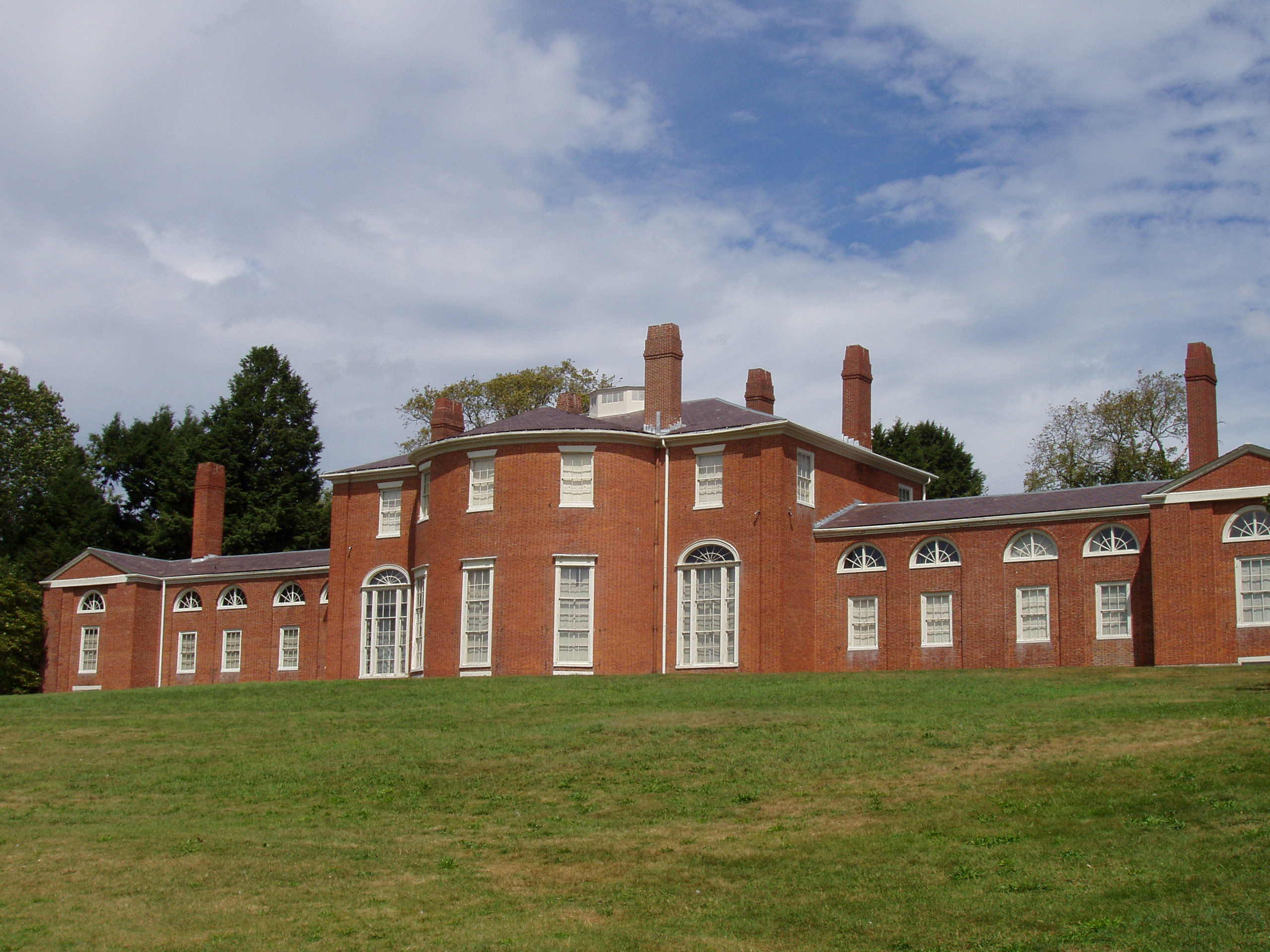
Gore Place, Waltham, Massachusetts

The commission resumed its work in early 1802, and had resolved all outstanding claims by August 1803. It awarded $110,000 to British claimants and over $6 million to American claimants. The lopsided result is due to the vastly larger number of American claims, but also to some key early decisions that favored American interpretations in the processing of the claims, and by a British administration that sought to remain in America's good graces.

The Gore's social circle in England revolved around his good friend Rufus King, who was appointed Ambassador to Great Britain in 1796, along with other Massachusetts expatriates. When King left his post in May 1803 he named Gore to head the London embassy as chargé d'affaires. Although President Thomas Jefferson never issued a formal appointment, the British government accepted his role for the two-month interval between King's departure and the arrival of James Monroe as King's replacement. The Gores sailed for Boston in the spring of 1804.

Rebecca Gore used their exposure to European country estates to design a lavish new building for their Waltham estate during their English sojourn. Designed with the assistance of French architect Joseph-Guillaume Legrand and probably also influenced by the works of English architect Sir John Soane, the house that was built upon their return to the United States in 1804 (now known as Gore Place) is one of the finest extant examples of Federalist architecture.

== Lawyer and state legislator ==
Soon after his return to the United States, Gore reentered state politics, winning election to the Massachusetts Senate. He was active in the state Federalist Party organization, sitting on its secret central committee. He resumed his law practice, in which he took on as a student Daniel Webster. One of the highest profile cases he took on was the 1807 defense of Thomas Selfridge, accused of murdering Charles Austin. Selfridge, an older Federalist attorney, had been retained to assist in the collection of a debt from Austin's Republican father. In the politically charged atmosphere of the day in Boston, Selfridge, fearing for his own safety, had armed himself with a dueling pistol. The younger Austin had, apparently on his own initiative, sought to beat Selfridge with a cane, and Selfridge fatally shot him in the encounter. Selfridge was prosecuted by Attorney General (and future Gore gubernatorial opponent) James Sullivan, and the defense also included arch-Federalist Harrison Gray Otis. Gore argued Selfridge acted in self-defense; Selfridge was acquitted of murder by a jury whose foreman was Patriot and Federalist Paul Revere after fifteen minutes' deliberation.

Gore also resumed business activities upon his return. He invested in a wide variety of businesses and infrastructure, spurring economic activity in the state. His investments ranged widely, including maritime insurance (where is father-in-law had made his fortune), bridges, locks, canals, and textiles. He was a major investor in the Middlesex Canal, the Craigie Bridge (the first to connect Boston to Cambridge), and the Boston Manufacturing Company, whose factory proving the single-site production of textiles was in Waltham near his estate. Not all of his ventures panned out: the canal was in the long run a financial failure, as were efforts with other collaborators to develop Lechmere Point, the Cambridge side of the Craigie Bridge. The textile mill, however, was a success, and Gore invested in the Merrimack Manufacturing Company. When it decided to locate in what is now Lowell, Massachusetts, Gore purchased shares in the Proprietors of Locks and Canals, which operated (and still owns today) the Lowell canals.

In 1806 Gore won election to the State Senate. That year the Republicans were in the majority, and the election for governor was close enough to require a recount. The legislature scrutinized the ballots in a partisan manner (for example, retaining ballots containing misspelled versions of Republican James Sullivan's name and discarding similar ballots marked for Federalist Caleb Strong). Gore and other Federalists raised a public outcry, and the legislature relented, eventually certifying Strong as the winner.

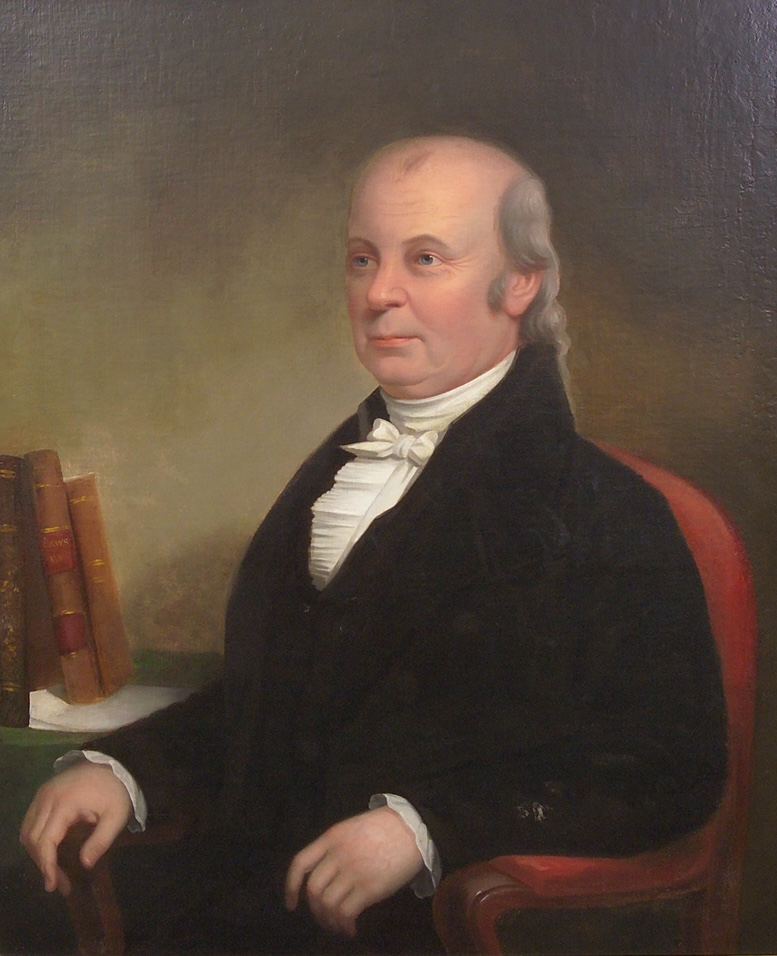
Gore defeated Levi Lincoln Sr. in the 1809 Massachusetts governor's race.

Gore ran unsuccessfully for Governor of Massachusetts in 1807 and 1808 against a rising tide of Republicanism in the state, losing both times to moderate Republican James Sullivan. The Federalists gained control of the state legislature in 1808 in a backlash against Republican economic policies, but Gore was criticized for his failure to aggressively support state protests against the Embargo Act of 1807, which had a major negative effect on the state's large merchant fleet. Gore was in 1808 elected to the Massachusetts House of Representatives, where he successfully led Federalist efforts to ensure the selection of a Federalist slate of presidential electors. He also spearheaded actions to drive Senator John Quincy Adams from the Federalist Party over his support of Thomas Jefferson's foreign policy. The legislature elected Adams' successor nine months early, and gave Adams sufficiently distasteful instructions that he resigned the post and joined with the Republicans.

== Governor ==
Gore led the Federalists to victory in 1809 against Sullivan's successor, Levi Lincoln Sr., who had taken over as acting governor upon Sullivan's death late in 1808. During Gore's term the principal domestic issue occupying state politics was a banking crisis stimulated by the federal policy of embargoing trade with Great Britain and France, then embroiled in the Napoleonic Wars. Although the crisis caused a number of bank failures in New England, Massachusetts banks largely escaped unscathed.

The seal of Cambridge, Massachusetts with Gore Hall, Harvard's since abolished library, in the center

Foreign policy played a major role in Gore's administration. The legislature passed resolves opposing the federal government's hardline policy against trade and diplomatic relations with the United Kingdom (then embroiled in the Napoleonic Wars), and Gore in early 1810 invited Francis James Jackson, who had been rejected as the UK's ambassador to the US, to visit the state. This pressure may have played a role in President James Madison's decision to renew relations with the UK and accept Jackson's credentials.

The lessening of the war threat, and the choice by the Republicans of the popular Elbridge Gerry as their candidate brought a challenge to Federalist control of Massachusetts in the 1810 elections. The unostentatious Gerry and Republican partisans criticized Gore for his lavish lifestyle, including his palatial Waltham residence and pompous activities he organized as governor, and highlighted his Loyalist family connections while emphasizing Gerry's unimpeachable patriotism. Gerry won the election. Jackson did visit Boston, but he was greeted not by Gore, but Gerry. Gore ran against Gerry again in 1811, but lost in another acrimonious campaign.

Gore was granted an honorary law degree from Harvard in 1809. He served on the college's Board of Overseers from 1810 to 1815 and as a Fellow from 1816 to 1820. Harvard's first library building, a Gothic structure built in 1838 of Quincy granite, was named in his honor, but was demolished when Widener Library was built in its place in 1915. (This structure is found on the seal of the city of Cambridge.) One of the residential Winthrop House's buildings is called Gore Hall in his honor.

== United States Senator ==
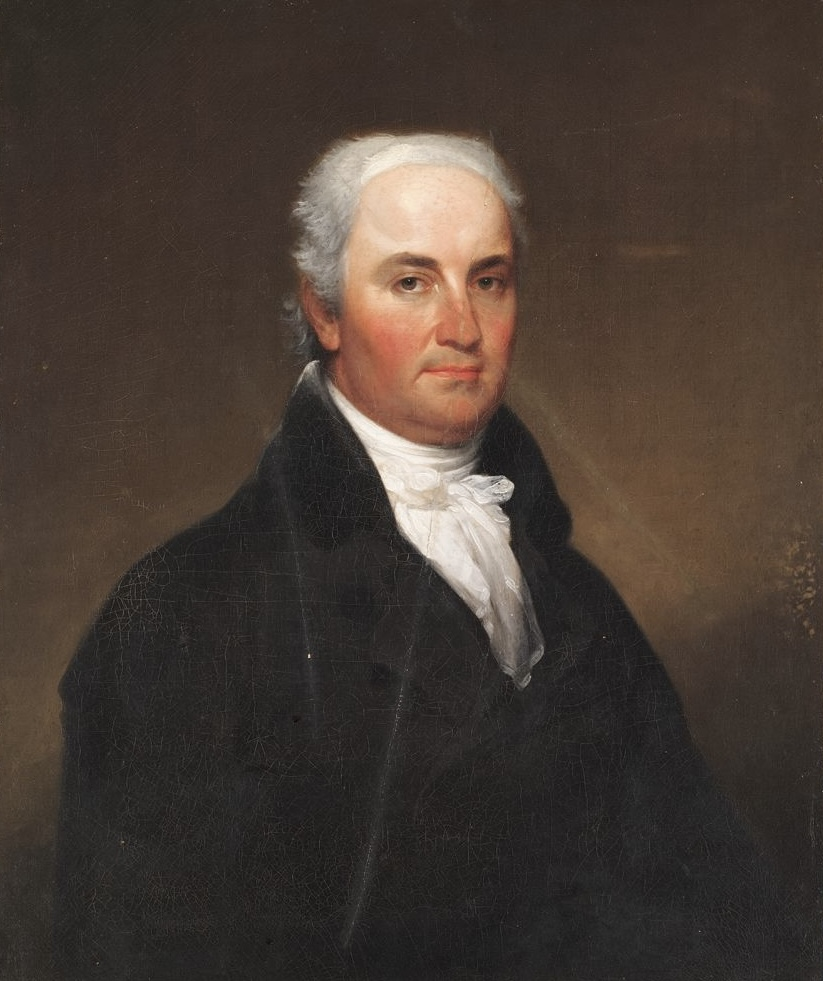
Portrait of Gore by John Trumbull, c. 1816

In the spring of 1813, he was appointed by Governor Caleb Strong to fill the U.S. Senate seat vacated by the resignation of Senator James Lloyd. He served from May 5, 1813, to May 30, 1816, winning reelection to the seat in 1814. He opposed the ongoing War of 1812 in these years, with his earlier diplomatic experience providing valuable knowledge to Federalist interests. He expressed approval of the 1814 Hartford Convention in which the New England states aired grievances concerning Republican governance of the country and the conduct of the war.

Gore assented to the Treaty of Ghent that ended the war, but was unhappy that the nation had not gained anything from the war. He resigned in June 1816, unhappy with the politics of Washington and suffering from poor health. Although he was no longer active in politics, he continued to express opinions on the subjects of the day, opposing the 1820 Missouri Compromise and bemoaning the "great moderation & mediocrity" of Federalist Governor John Brooks. He was a presidential elector in 1816.

== Later years and legacy ==
Coat of Arms of Christopher Gore

Gore remained active in the administration of Harvard, and was active in a number of organizations, including the American Academy of Arts and Sciences and the Massachusetts Historical Society (whose president he was from 1806 to 1818). He was also elected a member of the American Antiquarian Society in 1814. Gore spent most of his later years at his country estate in Waltham, suffering from worsening rheumatoid arthritis that made walking increasingly difficult. His declining health and lack of social scene in Waltham led him in 1822 to return to Boston in the winters. He died on March 1, 1827, in Boston, and is buried in its Granary Burying Ground.

Gore's wife died in 1834; the couple had no children. The major beneficiary of the Gore estate was Harvard (which received an estimated $100,000), although bequests were also made to the American Academy of Arts and Sciences and the Massachusetts Historical Society. The Waltham estate passed through several hands and was subdivided over time. The mansion was saved from demolition by the Gore Place Society (established for the purpose of preserving it), which now operates it as a museum. It was declared a National Historic Landmark in 1970.

== See also ==
- Christopher Gore, a vessel (1808–1818), that once brought migrants to Philadelphia.

== Sources ==
- Adams, Henry; Harbert, Earl (1986). History of the United States During the Administrations of James Madison. New York: Viking Press. ISBN 9780940450349. OCLC 123197471.
- Bacon, Edwin (1909). Boston, A Guide Book. Boston: Ginn. p. 26. OCLC 9308194.
- Bradford, Alden (1842). Biographical Notices of Distinguished Men in New England: Statesmen, Patriots, Physicians, Lawyers, Clergymen, and Mechanics. Boston, MA: S.G. Simpkins. p. 205. OCLC 9411881.
- Buel, Richard (2005). America on the Brink. New York: Palgrave Macmillan. ISBN 9781403962386. OCLC 55510543.
- Formisano, Ronald (1983). The Transformation of Political Culture: Massachusetts Parties, 1790s–1840s. New York: Oxford University Press. ISBN 9780195035094. OCLC 18429354.
- Heidler, David Stephen; Heidler, Jeanne (2004). Encyclopedia of the War of 1812. Annapolis, MD: Naval Institute Press. ISBN 9781591143628. OCLC 751086796.
- "Memoir of the Late Hon. Christopher Gore, of Waltham, Mass". Collections of the Massachusetts Historical Society (Third Series, Volume 3): 191–209. 1833.
- Pinkney, Helen (1969). Christopher Gore, Federalist of Massachusetts, 1758–1827. Waltham, MA: Gore Place Society. OCLC 1275057.
- Stark, James Henry (1910). The Loyalists of Massachusetts and the Other Side of the Revolution. Boston, MA: J.H. Stark. ISBN 978-0-7222-7679-2. OCLC 1655711.
- Tucker, Stanley, ed. (2012). The Encyclopedia of the War of 1812. Santa Barbara, CA: ABC-CLIO. ISBN 9781851099566. OCLC 749872877.
- Winsor, Justin (1880). The Memorial History of Boston. Boston: J.R. Osgood. p. 592. OCLC 978152.

Party political offices
Preceded by Caleb Strong	Federalist nominee for Governor of Massachusetts; 1808, 1809, 1810, 1811	Succeeded by Caleb Strong
Political offices
Preceded by Levi Lincoln Sr. as acting governor	Governor of Massachusetts; May 1, 1809 – June 10, 1810	Succeeded by Elbridge Gerry
U.S. Senate
Preceded by James Lloyd	U.S. senator (Class 1) from Massachusetts; May 5, 1813 – May 30, 1816; Served alongside: Joseph B. Varnum	Succeeded by Eli P. Ashmun
