= Gore Place =

Historic house in Massachusetts, United States

- U.S. National Register of Historic Places
- U.S. National Historic Landmark
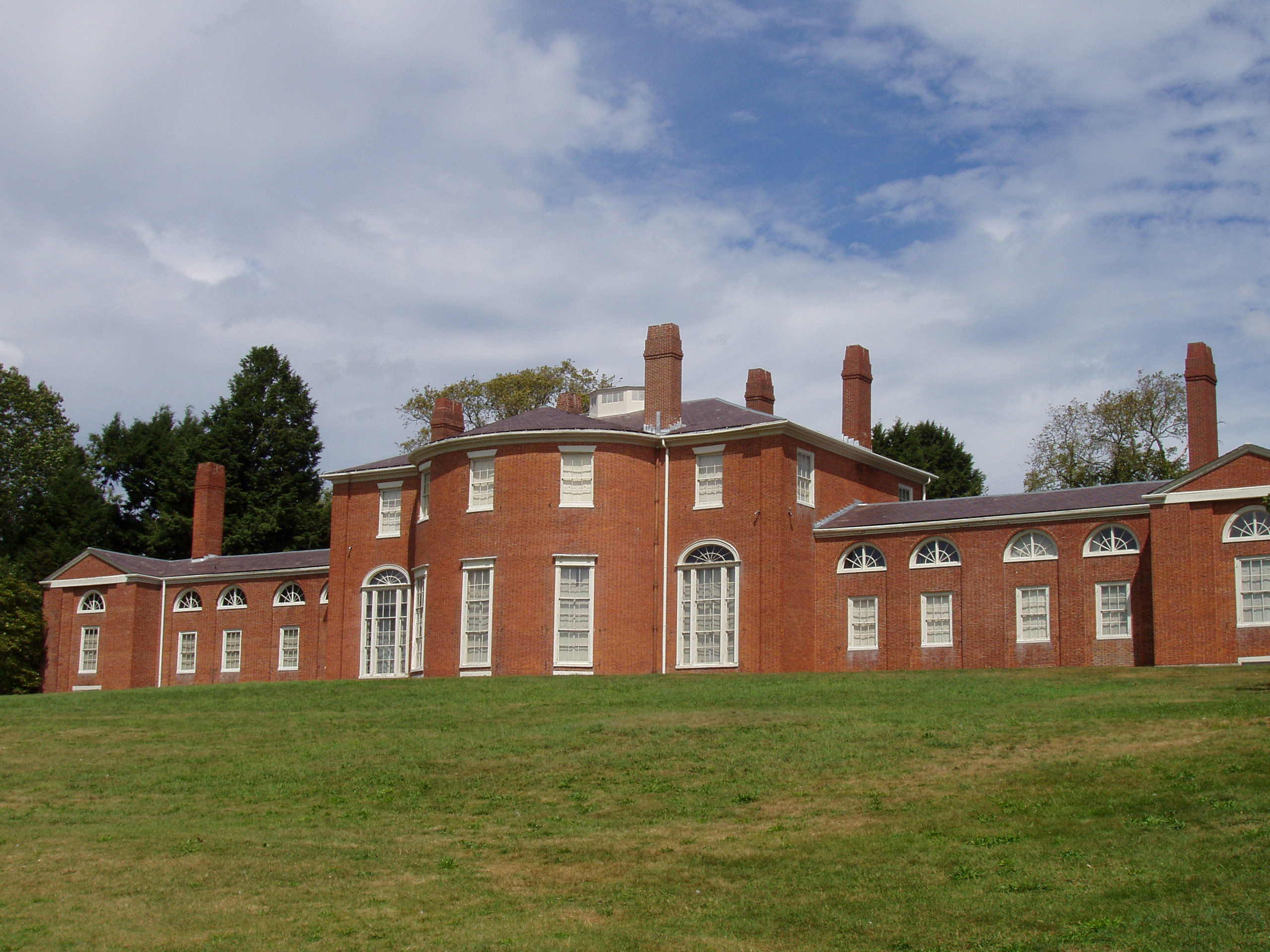
- The main house

- Location within Massachusetts Location within the United States
- Location: Waltham, Massachusetts
- Coordinates: 42°22′20″N 71°12′41″W
- Built: 1804–1806
- Architect: Jacques-Guillaume Legrand; Rebecca Gore
- Architectural style: Federal
- NRHP reference No.: 70000542

Significant dates
- Added to NRHP: December 30, 1970
- Designated NHL: December 30, 1970

Gore Place is a historic country house, now a museum, located at 52 Gore Street, Waltham, Massachusetts. It is owned and operated by the nonprofit Gore Place Society. The 45-acre (180,000 m^{2}) estate is open to the public daily without charge; an admission fee is charged for house tours. A number of special events are held throughout the year including an annual sheepshearing festival and a summer concert series.

The mansion was built in 1806 as a summer home for Massachusetts lawyer and politician Christopher Gore. In this house the Gores entertained various notables including the Marquis de Lafayette, Daniel Webster, and James Monroe. The property was designated a National Historic Landmark in 1970 in recognition of its architectural significance as a large-scale Federal style country house, and for its well-preserved domestic staff quarters, which illustrate the changing role of domestic labor over time.

== Christopher Gore ==
Christopher Gore (1758–1827) was a Massachusetts lawyer, banker, statesman, and Federalist politician. Educated at Harvard, Gore made a fortune speculating in American Revolutionary War debt in the 1780s, becoming, according to John Quincy Adams, the wealthiest lawyer in the country. In the 1790s he embarked on a career in politics and diplomacy, winning one term as Governor of Massachusetts in 1809. He was appointed to the United States Senate in 1813 and was elected to that body in 1814, serving until ill health prompted his resignation in 1816.

== Beginning of the Waltham estate ==
In 1785 Gore married Rebecca Amory Payne. She was the daughter of Edward Payne, a wealthy Boston merchant and banker. In 1786 they used the funds from her dowry to purchase a tract of roughly 50 acres (20 ha) in Waltham, Massachusetts, for use as a country estate. The estate was expanded by further purchase until it was 400 acres (160 ha) in size. In 1789 the Gores realized a windfall from his financial speculations and acquired the trappings of high society in Massachusetts. In 1789 they purchased a mansion on fashionable Bowdoin Square in Boston, and in 1793 they had the house on the Waltham property torn down and had it replaced with buildings suitable for a summers estate: a wood-frame mansion, said to be in the style of noted Federal style architect Samuel McIntire, and carriage house.

== Fire and new construction ==
In 1796 Gore was appointed by President George Washington to be a commissioner in London dealing with maritime issues pursuant to the Jay Treaty between the United States and Great Britain. The Gores spent the years from 1796 to 1804 in Europe. In 1799 they were informed that the Waltham house had been destroyed by fire and began planning a replacement. The carriage house was not affected and still stands on the property. In 1801 the couple went on an extended tour of Europe, including a six-month stay in Paris. During this stay they met architect Jacques-Guillaume Legrand, with whom they struck up a good relationship.

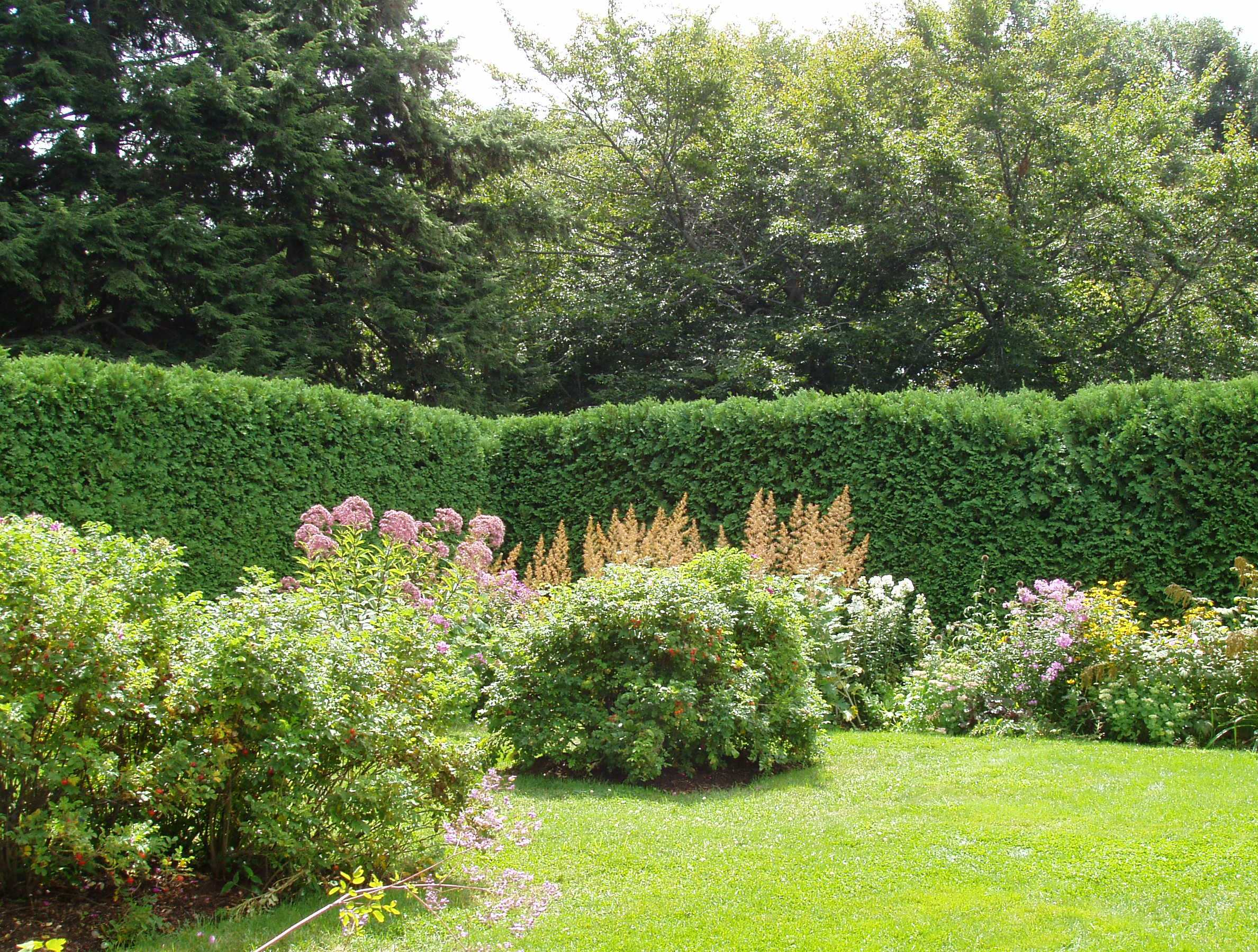
Detail of Gore Place gardens.

Rebecca Gore was particularly interested in architecture, and six months after their return to London had sketched out plans for a new building. In October 1802 Gore sent some of her sketches to his friend Rufus King, who was vacationing in Paris, requesting that Legrand draft plans from them. Although there is no definitive evidence that Legrand drafted the plans used in construction, the house as built has details that are part of his architectural vocabulary. It also betrays the influence of English architect Sir John Soane, some of whose designs the Gores may have seen on tours of England. They may also have seen his Sketches in Architecture, published in 1793.

The Gores returned to Massachusetts in 1804 and construction on the house began in March 1805; it was completed in 1806 at a cost of $23,000. Many of the mansion's construction materials, including the bricks, were shipped from England and rafted up the Charles River to the Waltham site. During the construction the Gores lived in a wing of the old house that had survived the fire; this remnant was then moved to the center of Waltham.

== Architecture ==
=== Mansion ===
The mansion consists of a central block with symmetrical wings on either side. Each wing consists of a narrow section, or hyphen, with a slightly wider pod at its end. The total length is about 190 feet (58 m); the main block, which includes oval protrusions, measures 68 by 40 feet, the hyphens are 40 by 21 feet, and the pods at the ends of the wings are 20 by 32 feet. The main block is 2 1/2 stories high, while the wings are 1 1/2 stories. The building is faced in brick made in Charlestown, Massachusetts. Although it was originally shingled in wood, the roof is now made of slate.

The main block and east wing are devoted to public and family space, while the west wing is entirely devoted to servant quarters and facilities.

=== Carriage house ===
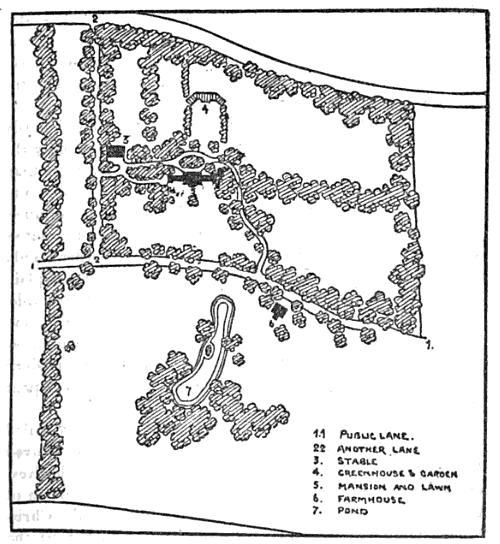
Sketch of the estate by Charles William Eliot, c. 1902

The 1790s carriage house is a 70 by 40 foot rectangular two story building with a hip roof. It is divided into three sections: the western end was used to store carriages, the eastern to stable horses, and the center, with high doors to facilitate the entry and exit of tall carriages was used for harnessing the carriages. The stable area had seven stalls, and includes distinctive features to facilitate the removal of waste and the supply of food to the animals. The tack room separated the stalls from the central area, also serving to isolate the smell of the stables from the rest of the building.

The building was originally located near the entrance to the property, but was relocated in 1968 to facilitate the widening of Gore Street. It has been adapted by the Gore Place Society for use as a function space.

=== Landscaping ===
The gardens, according to Charles W. Eliot (father of noted American landscape designer Charles Eliot), show the influence of English landscape architect Humphry Repton, whose Sketches and Hints on Landscape Gardening just predates the Gores' presence in England. In keeping with Repton's philosophy, the estate did not have many formal garden areas, and was instead laid out with broad lawns, discrete smaller gardens, and shaded paths that skirted the edges of the property.

== History ==
The property's recorded history of ownership dates to early colonial times, when Waltham was part of Watertown. When Watertown was laid out in 1630, its first minister, George Phillips, was granted a 40-acre (16 ha) lot which would become the core of the Gore estate. The estate passed through a variety of hands (including members of the Garfield family who were ancestors of United States President James Garfield, and Revolutionary War soldier Jonathan Brewer) before the Gores purchased it in 1786. From 1744 the property included a tavern, and the area was known as Davenport's Corner, after Jonathan Davenport, the first proprietor.

The Gores occupied the property until 1834, when Rebecca Gore died (Christopher Gore having died in 1827). They entertained numerous high-profile guests, including President James Monroe, Daniel Webster, and the Marquis de Lafayette.

The couple had no children, and according to their wills the contents of the property were auctioned off. The estate was purchased by Theodore Lyman, who built a farmhouse on the farmlands between the mansion and the Charles River. This structure was occupied by the head farmer of the estate, and was moved to its present location in the 20th century after the city took part of the estate by eminent domain for another road project. Lyman made a number of changes to the landscaping of the estate, including the construction of a formal garden area to the north of the main house.

The estate next passed through a succession of private hands, until it was acquired in 1921 by the Waltham Country Club. It established a golf course and tennis courts on the estate, but these initiatives failed during the Great Depression and the estate fell into disrepair.

In 1935 the bank that took the property planned to sell off the estate for housing, but preservationists from the Society for the Preservation of New England Antiquities (now Historic New England), the Trustees of Reservations, and the National Society of the Colonial Dames of America in the Commonwealth of Massachusetts organized a drive to preserve the property. After a fundraising campaign the property was purchased by the Gore Place Society. The Society acquired 75 acres (30 ha) of the original estate, and has rehabilitated its structures. About 30 acres (12 ha) of the estate were leased to Raytheon, and are not open to the public. The rest of the estate is open to the public; house tours are offered for a fee.

== See also ==
- List of National Historic Landmarks in Massachusetts
- National Register of Historic Places listings in Waltham, Massachusetts
