= 1808 Massachusetts gubernatorial election =

- April 4, 1808
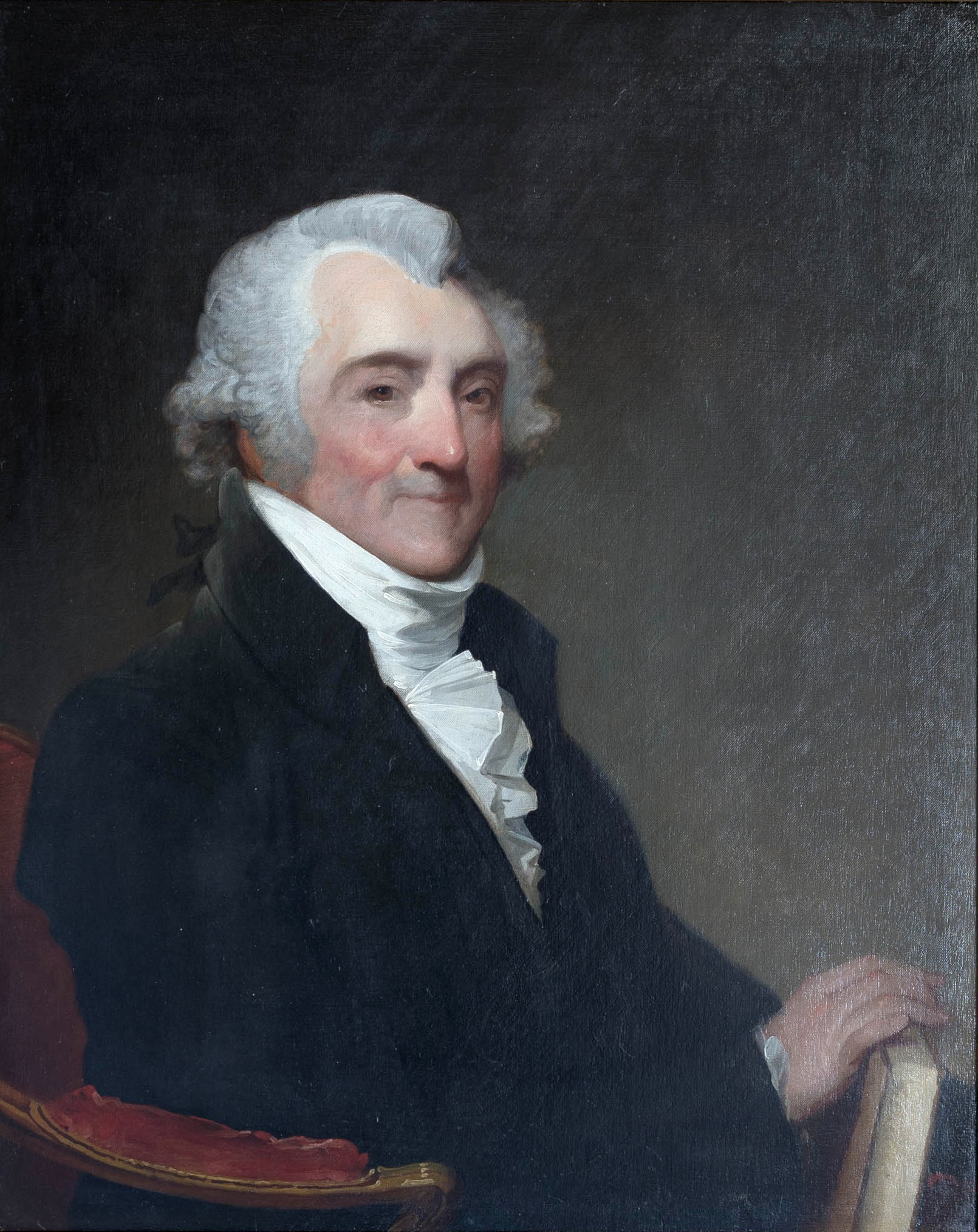

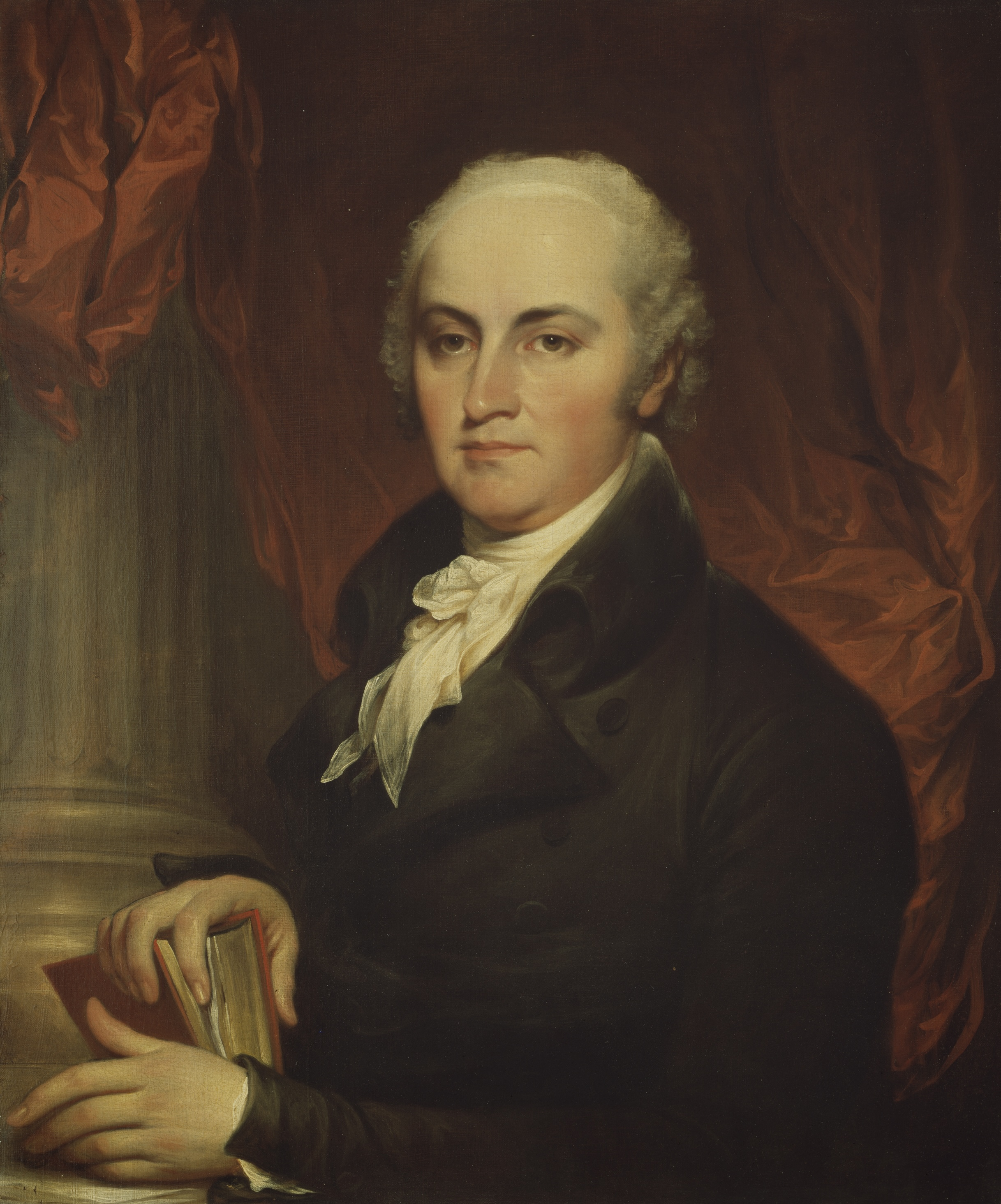
| Nominee | James Sullivan | Christopher Gore |
| Party | Democratic-Republican | Federalist |
| Popular vote | 41,193 | 39,643 |
| Percentage | 50.76% | 48.85% |
- County results Sullivan: 50–60% 60–70% 70–80% Gore: 50–60% 60–70%
Governor before election
James Sullivan
Democratic-Republican
Elected Governor
James Sullivan
Democratic-Republican

The 1808 Massachusetts gubernatorial election was held on April 4, 1808.

Incumbent Democratic-Republican Governor James Sullivan won re-election to a second term, defeating Federalist nominee Christopher Gore.

== General election ==
=== Candidates ===
- Christopher Gore, Federalist, incumbent State Senator
- James Sullivan, Democratic-Republican, incumbent Governor

=== Results ===
1808 Massachusetts gubernatorial election
| Party | Candidate | Votes | % | ±% |
|---|---|---|---|---|
| Democratic-Republican | James Sullivan (incumbent) | 41,193 | 50.76% | |
| Federalist | Christopher Gore | 39,643 | 48.85% | |
| Scattering | | 311 | 0.38% | |
| Majority | | 1,550 | 1.91% | |
| Turnout | | 81,147 | | |
| Democratic-Republican hold | | Swing | | |
