= Commonwealth v. Jennison =

Commonwealth of Massachusetts v. Nathaniel Jennison was a court case in Massachusetts in 1783 that effectively abolished slavery in that state. It was the third in a series of cases which became known as the Quock Walker cases.

Nathaniel Jennison was arrested for beating Quock Walker and indicted on a criminal charge of assault and battery in September 1781. The trial before the Supreme Judicial Court of Massachusetts was held in April 1783. Jennison's defense was that Walker was a runaway slave, but Walker countered that the Massachusetts Constitution had made slavery illegal in 1780. Chief Justice William Cushing accepted that argument and directed the jury that the issue of whether Walker had been freed or not was irrelevant because slavery was no longer constitutional. The jury convicted Jennison who was fined forty shillings.

The case was not widely publicized but made it clear that the law would not defend the property rights of slaveowners. Because that law depended on the enslaved person to take action to gain their freedom by either appealing to the courts or running away, people without the knowledge or the means to act continued to be held as slaves for years after the ruling. Slavery (or the willingness to reveal its presence) declined, and during the 1790 census, no slaves were recorded in the state.

However, it is understood that many former slaveowners reclassified their former slaves as still-legal "indentured servants." That allowed the former masters to be compliant with the law and to continue to take advantage of the labor of enslaved people, who might otherwise be unable to free themselves.

Edward L. Bell, in his 2021 book, Persistence of Memories of Slavery and Emancipation in Historical Andover, wrote:

The 'Mum Bett' and 'Quock Walker' cases were heard as jury trials with party-particular outcomes. The decisions of the Common Pleas courts and Supreme Judicial Court were unpublished and only existed in original manuscript form. In eighteenth-century legal circles, which depended on memory of judicial decisions and bench rulings to invoke case-made common law principles, the cases were soon forgotten. Practicing legal professionals in at least Berkshire and Worcester counties remembered the outcomes for a time, and advised their slave-owning clients of the futility of defending or appealing lawsuits for liberty in a changed legal landscape.

== See also ==
- Elizabeth Freeman, also known as "Mum Bett", another slave who won her freedom in court.
