= Quock Walker =

Enslaved American who filed a Freedom suit in Massachusetts in 1781

- Born: c. 1753; Massachusetts
- Died: Unknown (before 1810)
- Occupations: Enslaved person, farm worker
- Known for: Won his freedom based on the unconstitutionality of slavery in Massachusetts

Quock Walker, also known as Kwaku or Quork Walker (c. 1753 – ?), was an enslaved American who sued for and won his freedom suit case in June 1781. The court cited language in the 1780 Constitution of Massachusetts that declared, "All men are born free and equal". The case is credited with helping to abolish slavery in Massachusetts, although the 1780 constitution was never amended to prohibit the practice explicitly. Massachusetts was the first U.S. state to effectively and fully abolish slavery—the 1790 United States census recorded no enslaved people in the state.

== Early life ==
Quock Walker was born in Massachusetts in 1753 to enslaved parents Mingo and Dinah, who according to Connell O'Donovan were Akan people. The following year, the entire family was bought by James Caldwell, of the prominent Caldwell family of Worcester County. After Caldwell died, his widow remarried, and her new husband Nathaniel Jennison refused to manumit Walker who claimed Caldwell had promised to free him. In 1781 Walker escaped and fled to the house of Caldwell's brother. The dispute resulted in three separate legal proceedings, two civil and one criminal.

== Quock Walker cases ==
The Quock Walker cases were a series of three cases spanning 1781–1783 shortly after the Massachusetts State Constitution had gone into effect in 1780.

By the late 18th century, abolitionist sentiment was on the rise in Massachusetts. In 1780, the updated version of the Massachusetts State Constitution, written primarily by John Adams with the help of several committees (who determined its contents), declared "all men are born free and equal." In 1781, Elizabeth Freeman, an enslaved woman also known as Mum Bett, sued for freedom and won in county court based on her claim that slavery was inconsistent with the state constitution's declaration that "All men are born free and equal." Her case was cited by the state court in Quock Walker's cases shortly thereafter.

=== Background of the cases ===
Quock Walker was promised his freedom at the age of 25 by Caldwell. But, when Caldwell died in 1763, his widow remarried, becoming the wife of Nathaniel Jennison. When she herself died a few years later, Walker became Jennison's property.

When the time came for Walker's promised manumission, Jennison reneged on his late wife's promise and refused to free Walker. In 1781, Walker ran away and found work at a nearby farm belonging to Seth and John Caldwell, brothers of his former enslaver. Jennison retrieved him and beat him severely as punishment. Soon after, Walker sued Jennison for battery. The two did not disagree about the events of the case, but the question remained whether Jennison was permitted to beat Walker or, if it was as Walker argued, that this was an assault & battery, because he was attacked while free.

=== Cases ===
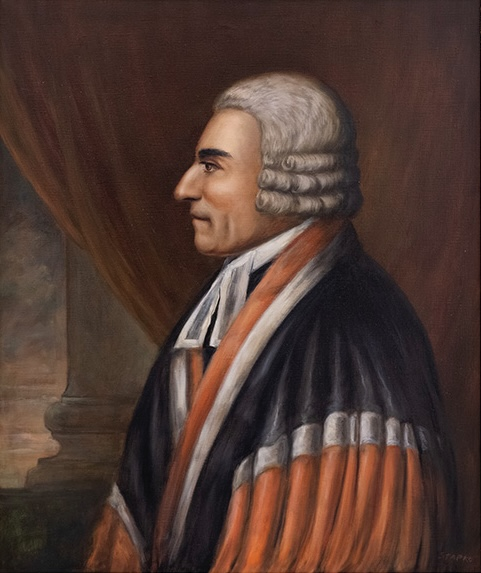
Chief Justice William Cushing

==== Walker v. Jennison ====
In Walker v. Jennison, Worcester County attorneys Levi Lincoln and Caleb Strong, helped Walker to sue Jennison for assault and battery, arguing that Walker was injured as a free man. The jury agreed, stating that "Quork is a Freeman and not the proper Negro slave of [Jennison]." The jury awarded him £50 in damages, though he had requested £300. While Jennison appealed, he lost his appeal after failing to appear.

==== Jennison v. Caldwell ====
In Jennison v. Caldwell, Jennison argued that Caldwell had enticed away Walker. The court found in Jennison's favor and awarded him £25. This decision was later overturned by the Massachusetts Supreme Judicial Court.

==== Commonwealth v. Jennison ====
In September 1781, the Attorney General filed a third case against Jennison, Commonwealth v. Jennison, for criminal assault and battery of Walker. In his instructions to the jury, Chief Justice William Cushing stated:

As to the doctrine of slavery and the right of Christians to hold Africans in perpetual servitude, and sell and treat them as we do our horses and cattle, that (it is true) has been heretofore countenanced by the Province Laws formerly, but nowhere is it expressly enacted or established. It has been a usage – a usage which took its origin from the practice of some of the European nations, and the regulations of British government respecting the then Colonies, for the benefit of trade and wealth. But whatever sentiments have formerly prevailed in this particular or slid in upon us by the example of others, a different idea has taken place with the people of America, more favorable to the natural rights of mankind, and to that natural, innate desire of Liberty, with which Heaven (without regard to color, complexion, or shape of noses-features) has inspired all the human race. And upon this ground our Constitution of Government, by which the people of this Commonwealth have solemnly bound themselves, sets out with declaring that all men are born free and equal – and that every subject is entitled to liberty, and to have it guarded by the laws, as well as life and property – and in short is totally repugnant to the idea of being born slaves. This being the case, I think the idea of slavery is inconsistent with our own conduct and Constitution; and there can be no such thing as perpetual servitude of a rational creature, unless his liberty is forfeited by some criminal conduct or given up by personal consent or contract ...

The jury found Jennison guilty, and the judge did not issue a written opinion.

=== Consequences of the cases ===
Legislators were unable or unwilling to address either enslavers' concerns about losing their "investment" or white citizens' concerns that if slavery were abolished, formerly enslaved people could become a burden on the community. Some feared that escaped enslaved people from elsewhere would flood the state.

The Massachusetts Supreme Judicial Court decisions in Walker v. Jennison and Commonwealth v. Jennison established the basis for ending slavery in Massachusetts on constitutional grounds. Still, no law or amendment to the state constitution was passed. Instead, slavery gradually ended "voluntarily" in the state over the next decade. The decisions in the Elizabeth Freeman and Quock Walker trials had removed slavery's legal support, and it was said to end by erosion. Some enslavers manumitted the people they enslaved formally and arranged to pay them wages for continued labor. Other enslaved people were "freed" but were restricted as indentured servants for extended periods. By 1790, the federal census recorded no enslaved people in the state.

== Massachusetts Emancipation Day / Quock Walker Day ==
In recognition of the declaration of rights that rendered slavery unconstitutional in Massachusetts, Bill H.3117 was signed by Governor Charlie Baker on November 1, 2022. The bill declares July 8 as Massachusetts Emancipation Day, also known as Quock Walker Day. Massachusetts Emancipation Day was marked as a statewide holiday by Governor Maura Healey in 2023.

== See also ==
- Walker Lewis, Quock Walker's nephew, who was ordained as one of the first African American Mormon Elders
- List of court cases in the United States involving slavery
