= List of governors of Massachusetts =

The governor of Massachusetts is the head of government of Massachusetts. Since 1780, 65 people have been elected governor, six to non-consecutive terms (John Hancock, Caleb Strong, Marcus Morton, John Davis, John A. Volpe, and Michael Dukakis), and seven lieutenant governors have acted as governor without subsequently being elected governor. Thomas Talbot served a stint as acting governor, but was elected governor several years later. Prior to 1918 constitutional reforms, both the governor's office and that of lieutenant governor were vacant on one occasion, when the state was governed by the Governor's Council.

== List of governors ==
=== Colonial Massachusetts ===
The colonial history of Massachusetts begins with the founding first of the Plymouth Colony in 1620, and then the Massachusetts Bay Colony in 1628. The Dominion of New England combined these and other New England colonies into a single unit in 1686, but collapsed in 1689. In 1692 the Province of Massachusetts Bay was established, merging Plymouth and Massachusetts Bay, which then included the territory of present-day Maine.

Colonial governors of Plymouth and the Massachusetts Bay Colony were elected annually by a limited subset of the male population (known as freemen), while Dominion officials and those of the 1692 province were appointed by the British crown. In 1774 General Thomas Gage became the last royally appointed governor of Massachusetts. He was recalled to England after the Battle of Bunker Hill in June 1775, by which time the Massachusetts Provincial Congress exercised de facto control of Massachusetts territory outside British-occupied Boston. Between 1775 and the establishment of the Massachusetts State Constitution in 1780 the state was governed by the provincial congress and an executive council.

=== Commonwealth of Massachusetts: 1780–present ===
The constitution of Massachusetts created the offices of governor and lieutenant governor, to be elected annually. Terms were lengthened to two years in 1918, to last until their successor was inaugurated, which would be at least the first Wednesday in the January after their election. This was changed to the Thursday following the first Wednesday in the January after the election in 1950, and terms were lengthened to four years in 1964.

Governors of the Commonwealth of Massachusetts
| No. | Governor | Term in office | Party | Election | Lt. Governor (Note: Lieutenant governors represented the same party as their governor unless noted.) |
|---|---|---|---|---|---|
| 1 | John Hancock (1737–1793) | October 25, 1780 – February 18, 1785 (1578 days; resigned) (Note: Hancock resigned abruptly in a "winter of increasing economic distress, political controversy, and social discord", and was suffering ill health, particularly gout. He announced his intention to resign on January 29, and left office on February 18.) | No parties | 1780 | Thomas Cushing |
| 1 | John Hancock (1737–1793) | October 25, 1780 – February 18, 1785 (1578 days; resigned) | No parties | 1781 | Thomas Cushing |
| 1 | John Hancock (1737–1793) | October 25, 1780 – February 18, 1785 (1578 days; resigned) | No parties | 1782 | Thomas Cushing |
| 1 | John Hancock (1737–1793) | October 25, 1780 – February 18, 1785 (1578 days; resigned) | No parties | 1783 | Thomas Cushing |
| 1 | John Hancock (1737–1793) | October 25, 1780 – February 18, 1785 (1578 days; resigned) | No parties | 1784 | Thomas Cushing |
| — | Thomas Cushing (1725–1788) | February 18, 1785 – May 27, 1785 (99 days; lost election) | No parties | Lieutenant governor acting | Acting as governor |
| 2 | James Bowdoin (1726–1790) | May 27, 1785 – June 1, 1787 (736 days; lost election) | No parties | 1785 | Thomas Cushing |
| 2 | James Bowdoin (1726–1790) | May 27, 1785 – June 1, 1787 (736 days; lost election) | No parties | 1786 | Thomas Cushing |
| 3 | John Hancock (1737–1793) | June 1, 1787 – October 8, 1793 (2322 days; died in office) | No parties | 1787 | Thomas Cushing |
| 3 | John Hancock (1737–1793) | June 1, 1787 – October 8, 1793 (2322 days; died in office) | No parties | 1788 | Benjamin Lincoln |
| 3 | John Hancock (1737–1793) | June 1, 1787 – October 8, 1793 (2322 days; died in office) | No parties | 1789 | Samuel Adams |
| 3 | John Hancock (1737–1793) | June 1, 1787 – October 8, 1793 (2322 days; died in office) | No parties | 1790 | Samuel Adams |
| 3 | John Hancock (1737–1793) | June 1, 1787 – October 8, 1793 (2322 days; died in office) | No parties | 1791 | Samuel Adams |
| 3 | John Hancock (1737–1793) | June 1, 1787 – October 8, 1793 (2322 days; died in office) | No parties | 1792 | Samuel Adams |
| 3 | John Hancock (1737–1793) | June 1, 1787 – October 8, 1793 (2322 days; died in office) | No parties | 1793 | Samuel Adams |
| 4 | Samuel Adams (1722–1803) | October 8, 1793 – June 2, 1797 (1334 days; retired) | No parties | Lieutenant governor acting | Acting as governor |
| 4 | Samuel Adams (1722–1803) | October 8, 1793 – June 2, 1797 (1334 days; retired) | Democratic- Republican | 1794 | Moses Gill (Note: Represented the Federalist Party) |
| 4 | Samuel Adams (1722–1803) | October 8, 1793 – June 2, 1797 (1334 days; retired) | Democratic- Republican | 1795 | Moses Gill |
| 4 | Samuel Adams (1722–1803) | October 8, 1793 – June 2, 1797 (1334 days; retired) | Democratic- Republican | 1796 | Moses Gill |
| 5 | Increase Sumner (1746–1799) | June 2, 1797 – June 7, 1799 (736 days; died in office) | Federalist | 1797 | Moses Gill |
| 5 | Increase Sumner (1746–1799) | June 2, 1797 – June 7, 1799 (736 days; died in office) | Federalist | 1798 | Moses Gill |
| 5 | Increase Sumner (1746–1799) | June 2, 1797 – June 7, 1799 (736 days; died in office) | Federalist | 1799 | Moses Gill |
| — | Moses Gill (1733–1800) | June 7, 1799 – May 20, 1800 (348 days; died in office) | Federalist | Lieutenant governor acting | Acting as governor |
| — | Governor's Council chaired by Thomas Dawes | May 20, 1800 – May 30, 1800 (11 days) | — | Governor's; Council acting | Vacant |
| 6 | Caleb Strong (1745–1819) | May 30, 1800 – May 29, 1807 (2556 days; lost election) | Federalist | 1800 | Vacant |
| 6 | Caleb Strong (1745–1819) | May 30, 1800 – May 29, 1807 (2556 days; lost election) | Federalist | 1801 | Samuel Phillips Jr. |
| 6 | Caleb Strong (1745–1819) | May 30, 1800 – May 29, 1807 (2556 days; lost election) | Federalist | 1802 | Edward Robbins (Note: Represented the Democratic-Republican Party) |
| 6 | Caleb Strong (1745–1819) | May 30, 1800 – May 29, 1807 (2556 days; lost election) | Federalist | 1803 | Edward Robbins |
| 6 | Caleb Strong (1745–1819) | May 30, 1800 – May 29, 1807 (2556 days; lost election) | Federalist | 1804 | Edward Robbins |
| 6 | Caleb Strong (1745–1819) | May 30, 1800 – May 29, 1807 (2556 days; lost election) | Federalist | 1805 | Edward Robbins |
| 6 | Caleb Strong (1745–1819) | May 30, 1800 – May 29, 1807 (2556 days; lost election) | Federalist | 1806 | Edward Robbins |
| 7 | James Sullivan (1744–1808) | May 29, 1807 – December 10, 1808 (562 days; died in office) | Democratic- Republican | 1807 | Levi Lincoln Sr. |
| 7 | James Sullivan (1744–1808) | May 29, 1807 – December 10, 1808 (562 days; died in office) | Democratic- Republican | 1808 | Levi Lincoln Sr. |
| — | Levi Lincoln Sr. (1749–1820) | December 10, 1808 – June 3, 1809 (176 days; lost election) | Democratic- Republican | Lieutenant governor acting | Acting as governor |
| 8 | Christopher Gore (1758–1827) | June 3, 1809 – June 2, 1810 (365 days; lost election) | Federalist | 1809 | David Cobb |
| 9 | Elbridge Gerry (1744–1814) | June 2, 1810 – May 30, 1812 (729 days; lost election) | Democratic- Republican | 1810 | William Gray |
| 9 | Elbridge Gerry (1744–1814) | June 2, 1810 – May 30, 1812 (729 days; lost election) | Democratic- Republican | 1811 | William Gray |
| 10 | Caleb Strong (1745–1819) | May 30, 1812 – June 1, 1816 (1464 days; retired) | Federalist | 1812 | William Phillips Jr. |
| 10 | Caleb Strong (1745–1819) | May 30, 1812 – June 1, 1816 (1464 days; retired) | Federalist | 1813 | William Phillips Jr. |
| 10 | Caleb Strong (1745–1819) | May 30, 1812 – June 1, 1816 (1464 days; retired) | Federalist | 1814 | William Phillips Jr. |
| 10 | Caleb Strong (1745–1819) | May 30, 1812 – June 1, 1816 (1464 days; retired) | Federalist | 1815 | William Phillips Jr. |
| 11 | John Brooks (1752–1825) | June 1, 1816 – May 30, 1823 (2555 days; retired) | Federalist | 1816 | William Phillips Jr. |
| 11 | John Brooks (1752–1825) | June 1, 1816 – May 30, 1823 (2555 days; retired) | Federalist | 1817 | William Phillips Jr. |
| 11 | John Brooks (1752–1825) | June 1, 1816 – May 30, 1823 (2555 days; retired) | Federalist | 1818 | William Phillips Jr. |
| 11 | John Brooks (1752–1825) | June 1, 1816 – May 30, 1823 (2555 days; retired) | Federalist | 1819 | William Phillips Jr. |
| 11 | John Brooks (1752–1825) | June 1, 1816 – May 30, 1823 (2555 days; retired) | Federalist | 1820 | William Phillips Jr. |
| 11 | John Brooks (1752–1825) | June 1, 1816 – May 30, 1823 (2555 days; retired) | Federalist | 1821 | William Phillips Jr. |
| 11 | John Brooks (1752–1825) | June 1, 1816 – May 30, 1823 (2555 days; retired) | Federalist | 1822 | William Phillips Jr. |
| 12 | William Eustis (1753–1825) | May 30, 1823 – February 6, 1825 (619 days; died in office) | Democratic- Republican | 1823 | Marcus Morton |
| 12 | William Eustis (1753–1825) | May 30, 1823 – February 6, 1825 (619 days; died in office) | Democratic- Republican | 1824 | Marcus Morton |
| — | Marcus Morton (1784–1864) | February 6, 1825 – May 27, 1825 (111 days; retired) | Democratic- Republican | Lieutenant governor acting | Acting as governor |
| 13 | Levi Lincoln Jr. (1782–1868) | May 27, 1825 – January 21, 1834 (3162 days; retired) | Democratic- Republican | 1825 | Thomas L. Winthrop |
| 13 | Levi Lincoln Jr. (1782–1868) | May 27, 1825 – January 21, 1834 (3162 days; retired) | Democratic- Republican | 1826 | Thomas L. Winthrop |
| 13 | Levi Lincoln Jr. (1782–1868) | May 27, 1825 – January 21, 1834 (3162 days; retired) | Democratic- Republican | 1827 | Thomas L. Winthrop |
| 13 | Levi Lincoln Jr. (1782–1868) | May 27, 1825 – January 21, 1834 (3162 days; retired) | Democratic- Republican | 1828 | Thomas L. Winthrop |
| 13 | Levi Lincoln Jr. (1782–1868) | May 27, 1825 – January 21, 1834 (3162 days; retired) | National; Republican | 1829 | Thomas L. Winthrop |
| 13 | Levi Lincoln Jr. (1782–1868) | May 27, 1825 – January 21, 1834 (3162 days; retired) | National; Republican | 1830 | Thomas L. Winthrop |
| 13 | Levi Lincoln Jr. (1782–1868) | May 27, 1825 – January 21, 1834 (3162 days; retired) | National; Republican | ^{Apr.}1831 | Thomas L. Winthrop |
| 13 | Levi Lincoln Jr. (1782–1868) | May 27, 1825 – January 21, 1834 (3162 days; retired) | National; Republican | ^{Nov.}1831 | Thomas L. Winthrop |
| 13 | Levi Lincoln Jr. (1782–1868) | May 27, 1825 – January 21, 1834 (3162 days; retired) | National; Republican | 1832 | Thomas L. Winthrop |
| 14 | John Davis (1787–1854) | January 21, 1834 – March 3, 1835 (407 days; resigned) (Note: Davis resigned, having been elected to the United States Senate.) | National; Republican | 1833–34 | Samuel Turell Armstrong (Note: Represented the Whig Party) |
| 14 | John Davis (1787–1854) | January 21, 1834 – March 3, 1835 (407 days; resigned) | Whig | 1834 | Samuel Turell Armstrong |
| — | Samuel Turell Armstrong (1784–1850) | March 3, 1835 – January 13, 1836 (317 days; lost election) (Note: Armstrong either did not receive or did not expect the Whig nomination, and so ran as an independent.) | Whig | Lieutenant governor acting | Acting as governor |
| 15 | Edward Everett (1794–1865) | January 13, 1836 – January 18, 1840 (1467 days; lost election) | Whig | 1835 | George Hull |
| 15 | Edward Everett (1794–1865) | January 13, 1836 – January 18, 1840 (1467 days; lost election) | Whig | 1836 | George Hull |
| 15 | Edward Everett (1794–1865) | January 13, 1836 – January 18, 1840 (1467 days; lost election) | Whig | 1837 | George Hull |
| 15 | Edward Everett (1794–1865) | January 13, 1836 – January 18, 1840 (1467 days; lost election) | Whig | 1838 | George Hull |
| 16 | Marcus Morton (1784–1864) | January 18, 1840 – January 9, 1841 (358 days; lost election) | Democratic | 1839 | George Hull |
| 17 | John Davis (1787–1854) | January 9, 1841 – January 18, 1843 (740 days; lost election) | Whig | 1840 | George Hull |
| 17 | John Davis (1787–1854) | January 9, 1841 – January 18, 1843 (740 days; lost election) | Whig | 1841 | George Hull |
| 18 | Marcus Morton (1784–1864) | January 18, 1843 – January 9, 1844 (357 days; lost election) | Democratic | 1842 | Henry H. Childs |
| 19 | George N. Briggs (1796–1861) | January 9, 1844 – January 13, 1851 (2562 days; lost election) | Whig | 1843–44 | Henry W. Cushman |
| 19 | George N. Briggs (1796–1861) | January 9, 1844 – January 13, 1851 (2562 days; lost election) | Whig | 1844 | Henry W. Cushman |
| 19 | George N. Briggs (1796–1861) | January 9, 1844 – January 13, 1851 (2562 days; lost election) | Whig | 1845–46 | Henry W. Cushman |
| 19 | George N. Briggs (1796–1861) | January 9, 1844 – January 13, 1851 (2562 days; lost election) | Whig | 1846 | Henry W. Cushman |
| 19 | George N. Briggs (1796–1861) | January 9, 1844 – January 13, 1851 (2562 days; lost election) | Whig | 1847 | Henry W. Cushman |
| 19 | George N. Briggs (1796–1861) | January 9, 1844 – January 13, 1851 (2562 days; lost election) | Whig | 1848–49 | Henry W. Cushman |
| 19 | George N. Briggs (1796–1861) | January 9, 1844 – January 13, 1851 (2562 days; lost election) | Whig | 1849–50 | Henry W. Cushman |
| 20 | George S. Boutwell (1818–1905) | January 13, 1851 – January 14, 1853 (733 days; retired) | Democratic | 1850–51 | Henry W. Cushman |
| 20 | George S. Boutwell (1818–1905) | January 13, 1851 – January 14, 1853 (733 days; retired) | Democratic | 1851–52 | Henry W. Cushman |
| 21 | John H. Clifford (1809–1876) | January 14, 1853 – January 12, 1854 (364 days; retired) | Whig | 1852 | William C. Plunkett |
| 22 | Emory Washburn (1800–1877) | January 12, 1854 – January 9, 1855 (363 days; lost election) | Whig | 1853–54 | William C. Plunkett |
| 23 | Henry Gardner (1819–1892) | January 9, 1855 – January 2, 1858 (1090 days; lost election) | Know Nothing | 1854 | Simon Brown |
| 23 | Henry Gardner (1819–1892) | January 9, 1855 – January 2, 1858 (1090 days; lost election) | Know Nothing | 1855 | Henry Wetherby Benchley (Note: Represented the Republican Party) |
| 23 | Henry Gardner (1819–1892) | January 9, 1855 – January 2, 1858 (1090 days; lost election) | Know Nothing | 1856 | Henry Wetherby Benchley |
| 24 | Nathaniel P. Banks (1816–1894) | January 2, 1858 – January 2, 1861 (1097 days; retired) | Republican | 1857 | Eliphalet Trask |
| 24 | Nathaniel P. Banks (1816–1894) | January 2, 1858 – January 2, 1861 (1097 days; retired) | Republican | 1858 | Eliphalet Trask |
| 24 | Nathaniel P. Banks (1816–1894) | January 2, 1858 – January 2, 1861 (1097 days; retired) | Republican | 1859 | Eliphalet Trask |
| 25 | John Albion Andrew (1818–1867) | January 2, 1861 – January 6, 1866 (1831 days; retired) | Republican | 1860 | John Z. Goodrich |
| 25 | John Albion Andrew (1818–1867) | January 2, 1861 – January 6, 1866 (1831 days; retired) | Republican | 1861 | John Nesmith |
| 25 | John Albion Andrew (1818–1867) | January 2, 1861 – January 6, 1866 (1831 days; retired) | Republican | 1862 | Joel Hayden |
| 25 | John Albion Andrew (1818–1867) | January 2, 1861 – January 6, 1866 (1831 days; retired) | Republican | 1863 | Joel Hayden |
| 25 | John Albion Andrew (1818–1867) | January 2, 1861 – January 6, 1866 (1831 days; retired) | Republican | 1864 | Joel Hayden |
| 26 | Alexander Bullock (1816–1882) | January 6, 1866 – January 9, 1869 (1100 days; retired) | Republican | 1865 | William Claflin |
| 26 | Alexander Bullock (1816–1882) | January 6, 1866 – January 9, 1869 (1100 days; retired) | Republican | 1866 | William Claflin |
| 26 | Alexander Bullock (1816–1882) | January 6, 1866 – January 9, 1869 (1100 days; retired) | Republican | 1867 | William Claflin |
| 27 | William Claflin (1818–1905) | January 9, 1869 – January 5, 1872 (1092 days; retired) | Republican | 1868 | Joseph Tucker |
| 27 | William Claflin (1818–1905) | January 9, 1869 – January 5, 1872 (1092 days; retired) | Republican | 1869 | Joseph Tucker |
| 27 | William Claflin (1818–1905) | January 9, 1869 – January 5, 1872 (1092 days; retired) | Republican | 1870 | Joseph Tucker |
| 28 | William B. Washburn (1820–1887) | January 5, 1872 – April 30, 1874 (847 days; resigned) (Note: Washburn resigned, having been elected to the United States Senate.) | Republican | 1871 | Joseph Tucker |
| 28 | William B. Washburn (1820–1887) | January 5, 1872 – April 30, 1874 (847 days; resigned) | Republican | 1872 | Thomas Talbot |
| 28 | William B. Washburn (1820–1887) | January 5, 1872 – April 30, 1874 (847 days; resigned) | Republican | 1873 | Thomas Talbot |
| — | Thomas Talbot (1818–1885) | April 30, 1874 – January 7, 1875 (253 days; lost election) | Republican | Lieutenant governor acting | Acting as governor |
| 29 | William Gaston (1820–1894) | January 7, 1875 – January 6, 1876 (365 days; lost election) | Democratic | 1874 | Horatio G. Knight |
| 30 | Alexander H. Rice (1818–1895) | January 6, 1876 – January 2, 1879 (1093 days; retired) | Republican | 1875 | Horatio G. Knight |
| 30 | Alexander H. Rice (1818–1895) | January 6, 1876 – January 2, 1879 (1093 days; retired) | Republican | 1876 | Horatio G. Knight |
| 30 | Alexander H. Rice (1818–1895) | January 6, 1876 – January 2, 1879 (1093 days; retired) | Republican | 1877 | Horatio G. Knight |
| 31 | Thomas Talbot (1818–1885) | January 2, 1879 – January 8, 1880 (372 days; retired) | Republican | 1878 | John Davis Long |
| 32 | John Davis Long (1838–1915) | January 8, 1880 – January 4, 1883 (1093 days; retired) | Republican | 1879 | Byron Weston |
| 32 | John Davis Long (1838–1915) | January 8, 1880 – January 4, 1883 (1093 days; retired) | Republican | 1880 | Byron Weston |
| 32 | John Davis Long (1838–1915) | January 8, 1880 – January 4, 1883 (1093 days; retired) | Republican | 1881 | Byron Weston |
| 33 | Benjamin Butler (1818–1893) | January 4, 1883 – January 3, 1884 (365 days; lost election) | Democratic | 1882 | Oliver Ames |
| 34 | George D. Robinson (1834–1896) | January 3, 1884 – January 6, 1887 (1100 days; retired) | Republican | 1883 | Oliver Ames |
| 34 | George D. Robinson (1834–1896) | January 3, 1884 – January 6, 1887 (1100 days; retired) | Republican | 1884 | Oliver Ames |
| 34 | George D. Robinson (1834–1896) | January 3, 1884 – January 6, 1887 (1100 days; retired) | Republican | 1885 | Oliver Ames |
| 35 | Oliver Ames (1831–1895) | January 6, 1887 – January 2, 1890 (1093 days; retired) | Republican | 1886 | John Q. A. Brackett |
| 35 | Oliver Ames (1831–1895) | January 6, 1887 – January 2, 1890 (1093 days; retired) | Republican | 1887 | John Q. A. Brackett |
| 35 | Oliver Ames (1831–1895) | January 6, 1887 – January 2, 1890 (1093 days; retired) | Republican | 1888 | John Q. A. Brackett |
| 36 | John Q. A. Brackett (1842–1918) | January 2, 1890 – January 8, 1891 (372 days; lost election) | Republican | 1889 | William H. Haile |
| 37 | William E. Russell (1857–1896) | January 8, 1891 – January 4, 1894 (1093 days; retired) | Democratic | 1890 | William H. Haile |
| 37 | William E. Russell (1857–1896) | January 8, 1891 – January 4, 1894 (1093 days; retired) | Democratic | 1891 | William H. Haile |
| 37 | William E. Russell (1857–1896) | January 8, 1891 – January 4, 1894 (1093 days; retired) | Democratic | 1892 | Roger Wolcott |
| 38 | Frederic T. Greenhalge (1842–1896) | January 4, 1894 – March 5, 1896 (792 days; died in office) | Republican | 1893 | Roger Wolcott |
| 38 | Frederic T. Greenhalge (1842–1896) | January 4, 1894 – March 5, 1896 (792 days; died in office) | Republican | 1894 | Roger Wolcott |
| 38 | Frederic T. Greenhalge (1842–1896) | January 4, 1894 – March 5, 1896 (792 days; died in office) | Republican | 1895 | Roger Wolcott |
| 39 | Roger Wolcott (1847–1900) | March 5, 1896 – January 4, 1900 (1401 days; retired) | Republican | Lieutenant governor acting | Acting as governor |
| 39 | Roger Wolcott (1847–1900) | March 5, 1896 – January 4, 1900 (1401 days; retired) | Republican | 1896 | Winthrop M. Crane |
| 39 | Roger Wolcott (1847–1900) | March 5, 1896 – January 4, 1900 (1401 days; retired) | Republican | 1897 | Winthrop M. Crane |
| 39 | Roger Wolcott (1847–1900) | March 5, 1896 – January 4, 1900 (1401 days; retired) | Republican | 1898 | Winthrop M. Crane |
| 40 | Winthrop M. Crane (1853–1920) | January 4, 1900 – January 8, 1903 (1100 days; retired) | Republican | 1899 | John L. Bates |
| 40 | Winthrop M. Crane (1853–1920) | January 4, 1900 – January 8, 1903 (1100 days; retired) | Republican | 1900 | John L. Bates |
| 40 | Winthrop M. Crane (1853–1920) | January 4, 1900 – January 8, 1903 (1100 days; retired) | Republican | 1901 | John L. Bates |
| 41 | John L. Bates (1859–1946) | January 8, 1903 – January 5, 1905 (729 days; lost election) | Republican | 1902 | Curtis Guild Jr. |
| 41 | John L. Bates (1859–1946) | January 8, 1903 – January 5, 1905 (729 days; lost election) | Republican | 1903 | Curtis Guild Jr. |
| 42 | William Lewis Douglas (1845–1924) | January 5, 1905 – January 4, 1906 (365 days; retired) | Democratic | 1904 | Curtis Guild Jr. |
| 43 | Curtis Guild Jr. (1860–1915) | January 4, 1906 – January 7, 1909 (1100 days; retired) | Republican | 1905 | Eben Sumner Draper |
| 43 | Curtis Guild Jr. (1860–1915) | January 4, 1906 – January 7, 1909 (1100 days; retired) | Republican | 1906 | Eben Sumner Draper |
| 43 | Curtis Guild Jr. (1860–1915) | January 4, 1906 – January 7, 1909 (1100 days; retired) | Republican | 1907 | Eben Sumner Draper |
| 44 | Eben Sumner Draper (1858–1914) | January 7, 1909 – January 5, 1911 (729 days; lost election) | Republican | 1908 | Louis A. Frothingham |
| 44 | Eben Sumner Draper (1858–1914) | January 7, 1909 – January 5, 1911 (729 days; lost election) | Republican | 1909 | Louis A. Frothingham |
| 45 | Eugene Foss (1858–1939) | January 5, 1911 – January 8, 1914 (1100 days; lost election) | Democratic | 1910 | Louis A. Frothingham |
| 45 | Eugene Foss (1858–1939) | January 5, 1911 – January 8, 1914 (1100 days; lost election) | Democratic | 1911 | Robert Luce |
| 45 | Eugene Foss (1858–1939) | January 5, 1911 – January 8, 1914 (1100 days; lost election) | Democratic | 1912 | David I. Walsh |
| 46 | David I. Walsh (1872–1947) | January 8, 1914 – January 6, 1916 (729 days; lost election) | Democratic | 1913 | Edward P. Barry |
| 46 | David I. Walsh (1872–1947) | January 8, 1914 – January 6, 1916 (729 days; lost election) | Democratic | 1914 | Grafton D. Cushing |
| 47 | Samuel W. McCall (1851–1923) | January 6, 1916 – January 2, 1919 (1093 days; retired) | Republican | 1915 | Calvin Coolidge |
| 47 | Samuel W. McCall (1851–1923) | January 6, 1916 – January 2, 1919 (1093 days; retired) | Republican | 1916 | Calvin Coolidge |
| 47 | Samuel W. McCall (1851–1923) | January 6, 1916 – January 2, 1919 (1093 days; retired) | Republican | 1917 | Calvin Coolidge |
| 48 | Calvin Coolidge (1872–1933) | January 2, 1919 – January 6, 1921 (736 days; retired) (Note: Coolidge was instead elected Vice President of the United States.) | Republican | 1918 | Channing H. Cox |
| 48 | Calvin Coolidge (1872–1933) | January 2, 1919 – January 6, 1921 (736 days; retired) | Republican | 1919 | Channing H. Cox |
| 49 | Channing H. Cox (1879–1968) | January 6, 1921 – January 8, 1925 (1464 days; retired) | Republican | 1920 | Alvan T. Fuller |
| 49 | Channing H. Cox (1879–1968) | January 6, 1921 – January 8, 1925 (1464 days; retired) | Republican | 1922 | Alvan T. Fuller |
| 50 | Alvan T. Fuller (1878–1958) | January 8, 1925 – January 3, 1929 (1457 days; retired) | Republican | 1924 | Frank G. Allen |
| 50 | Alvan T. Fuller (1878–1958) | January 8, 1925 – January 3, 1929 (1457 days; retired) | Republican | 1926 | Frank G. Allen |
| 51 | Frank G. Allen (1874–1950) | January 3, 1929 – January 8, 1931 (736 days; lost election) | Republican | 1928 | William S. Youngman |
| 52 | Joseph B. Ely (1881–1956) | January 8, 1931 – January 3, 1935 (1457 days; retired) | Democratic | 1930 | William S. Youngman |
| 52 | Joseph B. Ely (1881–1956) | January 8, 1931 – January 3, 1935 (1457 days; retired) | Democratic | 1932 | Gaspar G. Bacon |
| 53 | James Michael Curley (1874–1958) | January 3, 1935 – January 7, 1937 (736 days; retired) (Note: Curley instead ran unsuccessfully for the United States Senate.) | Democratic | 1934 | Joseph L. Hurley |
| 54 | Charles F. Hurley (1893–1946) | January 7, 1937 – January 5, 1939 (729 days; lost nomination) | Democratic | 1936 | Francis E. Kelly |
| 55 | Leverett Saltonstall (1892–1979) | January 5, 1939 – January 4, 1945 (2192 days; retired) (Note: Saltonstall was instead elected to the United States Senate.) | Republican | 1938 | Horace T. Cahill |
| 55 | Leverett Saltonstall (1892–1979) | January 5, 1939 – January 4, 1945 (2192 days; retired) | Republican | 1940 | Horace T. Cahill |
| 55 | Leverett Saltonstall (1892–1979) | January 5, 1939 – January 4, 1945 (2192 days; retired) | Republican | 1942 | Horace T. Cahill |
| 56 | Maurice J. Tobin (1901–1953) | January 4, 1945 – January 2, 1947 (729 days; lost election) | Democratic | 1944 | Robert F. Bradford |
| 57 | Robert F. Bradford (1902–1983) | January 2, 1947 – January 6, 1949 (736 days; lost election) | Republican | 1946 | Arthur W. Coolidge |
| 58 | Paul A. Dever (1903–1958) | January 6, 1949 – January 8, 1953 (1464 days; lost election) | Democratic | 1948 | Charles F. Sullivan |
| 58 | Paul A. Dever (1903–1958) | January 6, 1949 – January 8, 1953 (1464 days; lost election) | Democratic | 1950 | Charles F. Sullivan |
| 59 | Christian Herter (1895–1966) | January 8, 1953 – January 3, 1957 (1457 days; retired) | Republican | 1952 | Sumner G. Whittier |
| 59 | Christian Herter (1895–1966) | January 8, 1953 – January 3, 1957 (1457 days; retired) | Republican | 1954 | Sumner G. Whittier |
| 60 | Foster Furcolo (1911–1995) | January 3, 1957 – January 5, 1961 (1464 days; retired) (Note: Furcolo instead ran unsuccessfully for the Democratic nomination to the United States Senate.) | Democratic | 1956 | Robert F. Murphy |
| 60 | Foster Furcolo (1911–1995) | January 3, 1957 – January 5, 1961 (1464 days; retired) | Democratic | 1958 | Robert F. Murphy |
| 60 | Foster Furcolo (1911–1995) | January 3, 1957 – January 5, 1961 (1464 days; retired) | Democratic | 1958 | Vacant |
| 61 | John A. Volpe (1908–1994) | January 5, 1961 – January 3, 1963 (729 days; lost election) | Republican | 1960 | Edward F. McLaughlin Jr. (Note: Represented the Democratic Party) |
| 62 | Endicott Peabody (1920–1997) | January 3, 1963 – January 7, 1965 (736 days; lost nomination) | Democratic | 1962 | Francis Bellotti |
| 63 | John A. Volpe (1908–1994) | January 7, 1965 – January 22, 1969 (1477 days; resigned) (Note: Volpe resigned, having been confirmed as United States Secretary of Transportation.) | Republican | 1964 | Elliot Richardson |
| 63 | John A. Volpe (1908–1994) | January 7, 1965 – January 22, 1969 (1477 days; resigned) | Republican | 1966 | Francis Sargent |
| 64 | Francis Sargent (1915–1998) | January 22, 1969 – January 2, 1975 (2172 days; lost election) | Republican | Lieutenant governor acting | Acting as governor |
| 64 | Francis Sargent (1915–1998) | January 22, 1969 – January 2, 1975 (2172 days; lost election) | Republican | 1970 | Donald Dwight |
| 65 | Michael Dukakis (b. 1933) | January 2, 1975 – January 4, 1979 (1464 days; lost nomination) | Democratic | 1974 | Thomas P. O'Neill III |
| 66 | Edward J. King (1925–2006) | January 4, 1979 – January 6, 1983 (1464 days; lost nomination) | Democratic | 1978 | Thomas P. O'Neill III |
| 67 | Michael Dukakis (b. 1933) | January 6, 1983 – January 3, 1991 (2920 days; retired) | Democratic | 1982 | John Kerry |
| 67 | Michael Dukakis (b. 1933) | January 6, 1983 – January 3, 1991 (2920 days; retired) | Democratic | 1982 | Vacant |
| 67 | Michael Dukakis (b. 1933) | January 6, 1983 – January 3, 1991 (2920 days; retired) | Democratic | 1986 | Evelyn Murphy |
| 68 | Bill Weld (b. 1945) | January 3, 1991 – July 29, 1997 (2400 days; resigned) (Note: Weld resigned, having been nominated for United States Ambassador to Mexico; however, he was not confirmed.) | Republican | 1990 | Paul Cellucci |
| 68 | Bill Weld (b. 1945) | January 3, 1991 – July 29, 1997 (2400 days; resigned) | Republican | 1994 | Paul Cellucci |
| 69 | Paul Cellucci (1948–2013) | July 29, 1997 – April 10, 2001 (1352 days; resigned) (Note: Cellucci resigned, having been confirmed as United States Ambassador to Canada.) | Republican | Lieutenant governor acting | Acting as governor |
| 69 | Paul Cellucci (1948–2013) | July 29, 1997 – April 10, 2001 (1352 days; resigned) | Republican | 1998 | Jane Swift |
| — | Jane Swift (b. 1965) | April 10, 2001 – January 2, 2003 (633 days; retired) | Republican | Lieutenant governor acting | Acting as governor |
| 70 | Mitt Romney (b. 1947) | January 2, 2003 – January 4, 2007 (1464 days; retired) | Republican | 2002 | Kerry Healey |
| 71 | Deval Patrick (b. 1956) | January 4, 2007 – January 8, 2015 (2927 days; retired) | Democratic | 2006 | Tim Murray |
| 71 | Deval Patrick (b. 1956) | January 4, 2007 – January 8, 2015 (2927 days; retired) | Democratic | 2010 | Tim Murray |
| 71 | Deval Patrick (b. 1956) | January 4, 2007 – January 8, 2015 (2927 days; retired) | Democratic | 2010 | Vacant |
| 72 | Charlie Baker (b. 1956) | January 8, 2015 – January 5, 2023 (2920 days; retired) | Republican | 2014 | Karyn Polito |
| 72 | Charlie Baker (b. 1956) | January 8, 2015 – January 5, 2023 (2920 days; retired) | Republican | 2018 | Karyn Polito |
| 73 | Maura Healey (b. 1971) | January 5, 2023 – Incumbent (Note: Healey's term will expire on January 7, 2027; she was elected to a second term on November 3, 2026.) (in office 1418 days) | Democratic | 2022 | Kim Driscoll |
| 73 | Maura Healey (b. 1971) | January 5, 2023 – Incumbent (in office 1418 days) | Democratic | 2026 | Kim Driscoll |

== See also ==
- Gubernatorial lines of succession in the United States § Massachusetts
- First ladies and gentlemen of Massachusetts
- List of lieutenant governors of Massachusetts
- List of colonial governors of Massachusetts
- List of Massachusetts General Courts

== Sources ==
- "Former Massachusetts Governors". National Governors Association.
- "Massachusetts Constitution". State Democracy Research Initiative. University of Wisconsin Law School.
- Dubin, Michael J. (2003). United States Gubernatorial Elections, 1776–1860: The Official Results by State and County. McFarland. ISBN 0-7864-1439-1 – via Internet Archive.
- Glashan, Roy R. (1979). American Governors and Gubernatorial Elections, 1775-1978. Meckler Books. ISBN 0-7201-1511-6 – via Internet Archive.
- Kallenbach, Joseph E.; Kallenbach, Jessamine S. (1977). American State Governors, 1776-1976. Oceana Publications. ISBN 978-0-379-00665-0 – via Internet Archive.
- Mullaney, Marie Marmo (1994). Biographical Directory of the Governors of the United States, 1988–1994. Greenwood Publishing Group. ISBN 0-313-28312-5 – via Internet Archive.
- Sobel, Robert; Raimo, John (1978). Biographical Directory of the Governors of the United States, 1789-1978. Vol. 2. Meckler Books. ISBN 0-930466-01-2 – via Internet Archive.
- Thorpe, Francis Newton, ed. (1909). The Federal and State Constitutions, Colonial Charters, and Other Organic Laws of the States, Territories, and Colonies Now or Heretofore Forming the United States of America. Vol. 3. United States Government Publishing Office – via Internet Archive.
