= 1791 Massachusetts gubernatorial election =

- April 4, 1791
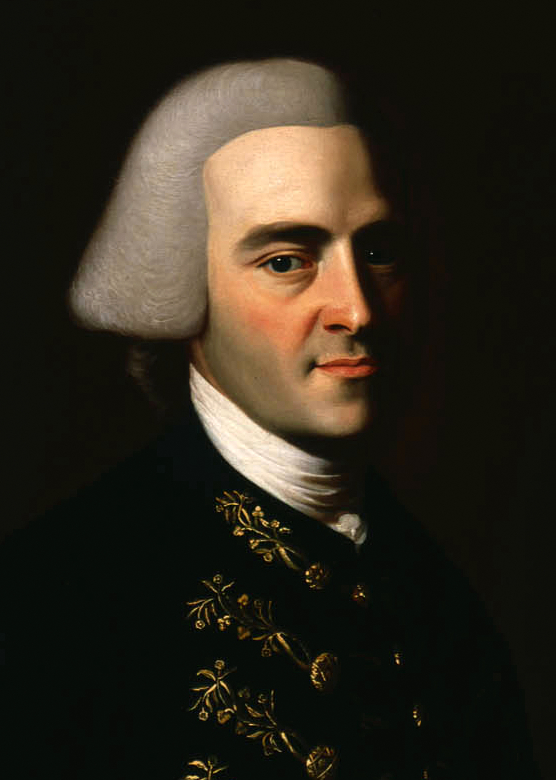
Nominee	John Hancock
Party	Nonpartisan
Popular vote	16,055
Percentage	93.94%
- County results Hancock: 80–90% 90–100%
Governor before election
John Hancock
Nonpartisan
Elected Governor
John Hancock
Nonpartisan

A gubernatorial election was held in Massachusetts on April 4, 1791. John Hancock, the incumbent governor, was re-elected against scattering opposition.

== Results ==
Massachusetts gubernatorial election, 1791
Party	Candidate	Votes	%	±%
Nonpartisan	John Hancock (incumbent)	16,055	93.94%	+7.41
Federalist	Francis Dana	278	1.63%	+1.38
Nonpartisan	Thomas Russell	176	1.03%	+1.02
Nonpartisan	Samuel Phillips Jr.	126	0.74%	+0.46
Federalist	Benjamin Lincoln	121	0.71%	+0.49
Federalist	John Lowell	98	0.57%	New
Nonpartisan	David Cobb	38	0.22%	–0.53
Nonpartisan	Samuel Adams	37	0.22%	+0.03
Nonpartisan	Azor Orne	25	0.15%	+0.05
Nonpartisan	Nathaniel Gorham	21	0.12%	–0.04
Nonpartisan	James Bowdoin	20	0.12%	–11.21
Nonpartisan	Tristram Dalton	19	0.11%	New
Nonpartisan	William Heath	12	0.07%	0.06
Nonpartisan	Elbridge Gerry	10	0.06%	New
Federalist	Caleb Strong	10	0.06%	New
Federalist	Theophilus Parsons	4	0.02%	New
Nonpartisan	Charles Jarvis	3	0.02%	New
Nonpartisan	Josiah Thatcher	3	0.02%	New
Nonpartisan	Oliver Wendell	3	0.02%	New
Nonpartisan	John Worthington	3	0.02	New
Nonpartisan	Loansami Baldwin	2	0.01%	New
Nonpartisan	John Gardner	2	0.01%	New
Nonpartisan	Jacob Goodlove	2	0.01%	New
Nonpartisan	William Lithgow	2	0.01%	New
Nonpartisan	Ebenezer Seale	2	0.01%	New
Nonpartisan	James Sullivan	2	0.01%	New
Nonpartisan	Samuel Alline	1	0.00%	New
Nonpartisan	Christopher Clack	1	0.00%	New
Nonpartisan	Thomas Cushing	1	0.00%	New
Nonpartisan	Solomon Freeman	1	0.00%	New
Nonpartisan	Ebenezer Hancock	1	0.00%	New
Nonpartisan	Henry Hodan	1	0.00%	New
Nonpartisan	Andrew Oliver	1	0.00%	New
Nonpartisan	Isaac Randall	1	0.00%	New
Nonpartisan	Richard Richardson	1	0.00%	New
Nonpartisan	Amos Singletary	1	0.00%	New
Federalist	Increase Sumner	1	0.00%	New
Federalist	George Thatcher	1	0.00%	New
Nonpartisan	Samuel Wallis	1	0.00%	New
Nonpartisan	James Warren	1	0.00%	–0.02
Nonpartisan	James Whitman	1	0.00%	New
Nonpartisan	Solomon Williams	1	0.00%	New
Total votes		17,091	100.00%	
Nonpartisan hold				
