= 1790 Massachusetts gubernatorial election =

- April 5, 1790
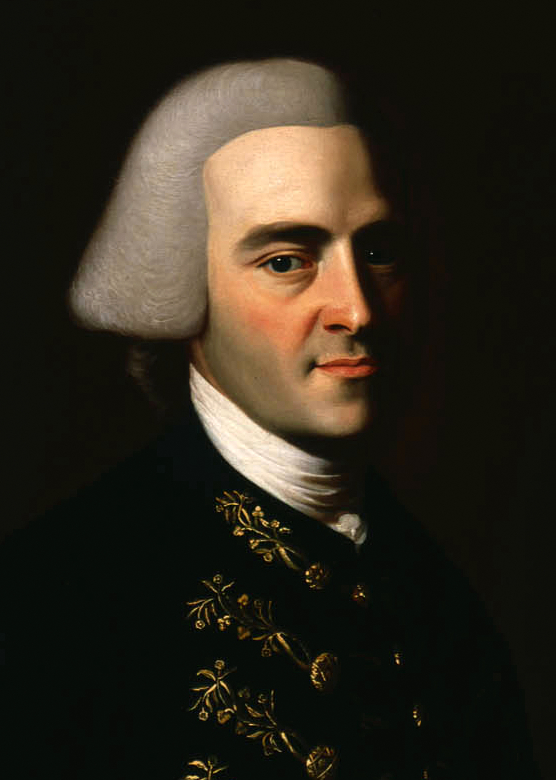

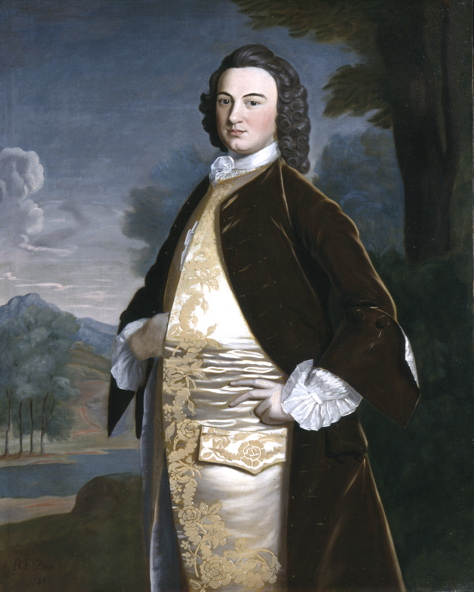
| Nominee | John Hancock | James Bowdoin |
| Party | Nonpartisan | Nonpartisan |
| Popular vote | 14,360 | 1,880 |
| Percentage | 86.53% | 11.33% |
- County results Hancock: 70–80% 80–90% 90–100% No Data/Vote
Governor before election
John Hancock
Nonpartisan
Elected Governor
John Hancock
Nonpartisan

A gubernatorial election was held in Massachusetts on April 5, 1790. John Hancock, the incumbent governor, defeated James Bowdoin, who had served as the second governor of Massachusetts from 1785 to 1787.

== Results ==
Massachusetts gubernatorial election, 1790
| Party | Candidate | Votes | % | ±% |
|---|---|---|---|---|
| Nonpartisan | John Hancock (incumbent) | 14,360 | 86.53% | +5.96 |
| Nonpartisan | James Bowdoin | 1,880 | 11.33% | −4.76 |
| Nonpartisan | David Cobb | 124 | 0.75% | New |
| Nonpartisan | Samuel Phillips Jr. | 47 | 0.28% | +0.28 |
| Nonpartisan | Francis Dana | 42 | 0.25% | New |
| Nonpartisan | Benjamin Lincoln | 37 | 0.22% | −1.82 |
| Nonpartisan | Samuel Adams | 32 | 0.19% | −0.21 |
| Nonpartisan | Nathaniel Gorham | 27 | 0.16% | +0.12 |
| Nonpartisan | Azor Orne | 17 | 0.10% | New |
| Nonpartisan | James Warren | 4 | 0.02% | +0.02 |
| Nonpartisan | Isaac Stokey | 3 | 0.02% | New |
| Nonpartisan | Thomas B. Waite | 3 | 0.02% | New |
| Nonpartisan | John Hastings | 2 | 0.01% | New |
| Nonpartisan | Oliver Prescott | 2 | 0.01% | New |
| Nonpartisan | Elias Soule | 2 | 0.01% | New |
| Nonpartisan | John Adams | 1 | 0.01% | — |
| Nonpartisan | John Avery Jr. | 1 | 0.01% | New |
| Nonpartisan | Joseph Barrett | 1 | 0.01% | New |
| Nonpartisan | Elijah Cutler | 1 | 0.01% | New |
| Nonpartisan | John Dean | 1 | 0.01% | New |
| Nonpartisan | John Farmer | 1 | 0.01% | New |
| Nonpartisan | John Gentry | 1 | 0.01% | New |
| Nonpartisan | William Heath | 1 | 0.01% | New |
| Nonpartisan | Michael Hodges | 1 | 0.01% | New |
| Nonpartisan | Jonah Jackson | 1 | 0.01% | New |
| Nonpartisan | Joseph MacLellen | 1 | 0.01% | New |
| Nonpartisan | Timothy Newell | 1 | 0.01% | New |
| Nonpartisan | Thomas Russell | 1 | 0.01% | New |
| Total votes | | 16,595 | 100.00% | |
| Nonpartisan hold | | | | |

=== Results by county ===
| | John Hancock Nonpartisan | | James Bowdoin Nonpartisan | | Scattering | | County total |
| County | Votes | Percent | Votes | Percent | Votes | Percent | County total |
|---|---|---|---|---|---|---|---|
| Barnstable | 244 | 85.61 | 41 | 14.38 | — | | 285 |
| Berkshire | 835 | 94.78 | 38 | 4.31 | 8 (Note: Gorham 5, Lincoln 3) | 0.91 | 881 |
| Bristol | 1,144 | 88.89 | 36 | 2.80 | 107 (Note: Cobb 104, Lincoln 2, Stokey 1) | 8.31 | 1,287 |
| Cumberland | 541 | 96.26 | 13 | 2.31 | 8 (Note: Stokey 3, Waite 3, Gentry 1, MacLellen 1) | 1.42 | 562 |
| Dukes | 134 | 94.37 | 8 | 5.63 | — | | 142 |
| Essex | 1,155 | 78.687 | 251 | 17.10 | 62 (Note: Phillips 47, Orne 6, Lincoln 5, Samuel Adams 3, Hodges 1) | 4.22 | 1,468 |
| Hampshire | 1,937 | 82.67 | 348 | 14.85 | 58 (Note: Dana 38, Orne 9, Samuel Adams 7, Hastings 2, Gorham 1, Warren 1) | 2.48 | 2,343 |
| Lincoln | 1,160 | 93.10 | 71 | 5.70 | 15 (Note: Samuel Adams 14, Dean 1) | 1.20 | 1,246 |
| Middlesex | 1,979 | 91.70 | 161 | 7.46 | 18 (Note: Lincoln 14, Prescott 2, Gorham 1, Jackson 1) | 0.83 | 2,158 |
| Nantucket | 180 | 98.90 | 2 | 1.10 | — | | 182 |
| Plymouth | 614 | 77.52 | 147 | 18.56 | 31 (Note: Cobb 20, Gorham 7, Lincoln 2, Soule 2) | 3.91 | 792 |
| Suffolk | 1,639 | 79.03 | 421 | 20.30 | 14 (Note: Lincoln 10, Samuel Adams 2, Barrett 1, Russell 1) | 0.68 | 2,074 |
| Worcester | 2,224 | 87.01 | 302 | 11.82 | 30 (Note: Gorham 13, Samuel Adams 5, Dana 4, Orne 2, John Adams 1, Avery 1, Cutler 1, Farmer 1, Lincoln 1, Newell 1) | 1.17 | 2,556 |
| York | 564 | 92.76 | 41 | 6.74 | 3 (Note: Warren 2, Samuel Adams 1) | 0.49 | 608 |
| TOTAL | 14,360 | 86.53 | 1,880 | 11.33 | 355 | 2.14 | 16,595 |
