= William H. Sumner =

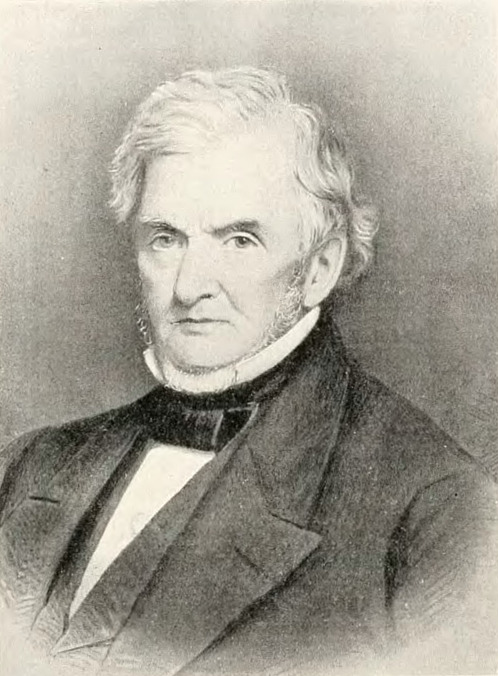
- Born: William Hyslop Sumner; July 4, 1780; Roxbury, Massachusetts, U.S.
- Died: October 24, 1861 (aged 81); Boston, Massachusetts, U.S.
- Education: Phillips Academy
- Alma mater: Harvard University
- Occupations: Lawyer, soldier, writer
- Spouses: Mary Ann DeWolf Perry (m. 1826; died 1834) Maria Doane Greenough (m. 1836; died 1843) Mary Dickinson Kemble (m. 1848)
- Parent(s): Increase Sumner; Elizabeth Hyslop
- Relatives: Sumner family

William Hyslop Sumner (July 4, 1780 – October 24, 1861) was an American lawyer, soldier, and writer, and the son of Governor Increase Sumner. He graduated from Harvard College in 1799, and practiced law. He served as a general in the Massachusetts militia. Sumner wrote The History of East Boston and died in 1861.

== Early life ==
William H. Sumner spent his boyhood in Roxbury, Massachusetts, living in the house on the corner of Washington and Cliff Streets bought by his father, Governor Increase Sumner prior to the American Revolutionary War. His mother was the former Elizabeth Hyslop, a daughter of his namesake, William Hyslop. His sister, Mehitable Stoddard Sumner, was the wife of Benjamin Welles (grandparents of philanthropist Benjamin Welles), and sister Eliza Sumner was the wife of James Watson Gerard (grandparents of diplomat James W. Gerard).

After primary school in Roxbury he attended Phillips Academy in Andover, Massachusetts. He later attended and graduated from Harvard College in 1799, shortly after the death of his father.

== Career ==
After graduating from college, Sumner entered the law office of district attorney John Davis, gaining admittance to the bar in 1802. He practiced law from 1802 until 1818 when he left the field in order to concentrate on his military duties. From 1808 to 1819 Sumner served in the Massachusetts State Legislature representing the city of Boston. In 1806 and again in 1813 to 1816 he was selected as aide-de-camp to Governor Caleb Strong. He served in the same role from 1816-1818 to Governor John Brooks. In 1818, Governor Brooks appointed him adjutant general of the state along with the office of quartermaster general which he held until he resigned the office in 1834.

=== War of 1812 ===
Sumner was involved in the state's defenses during the War of 1812. In September 1814 Massachusetts Governor Caleb Strong sent Sumner, then a lieutenant colonel in the state militia, to coordinate the defense of Portland in the District of Maine. His task was to maintain 1,900 militia and create a better relationship between the Massachusetts militia and the U.S. Army forces posted there. There were many problems with the early American militia:

Some of the men were deserting and had to be brought back by force and some officers were protesting against serving under regulars. The militia in Oxford county were even more troublesome...its militia showed little interest in making sacrifices for war. According to Sumner, they were "undisciplined, badly armed, miserably provided and worse commanded." ... Sumner could see no way of implementing a command agreement except by using force, which meant using militia against militia.

In 1826 he served on a board with a young Zachary Taylor to consider improvements in the militia. They recommended that "a complete system of tactics and exercise for cavalry and artillery of the militia" be created. This would organize the US militia who were so disjointed during the War of 1812. Congress however did not approve this plan.

=== East Boston ===
Through his maternal grandmother, Mehitable (née Stoddard) Hyslop, he was part of the Stoddard family, which owned Noddle's Island in Boston Harbor. Sumner's main accomplishment was the development of Noddle's Island as East Boston, an extension of the City of Boston, beginning in 1833, in partnership with Stephen White and Francis J. Oliver. The East Boston Company was created to conduct the development, and The East Boston Timber Company was created to supply wood from upstate New York to shipbuilders whom the Company hoped to attract to the shores of East Boston.

The East Boston Company, founded on March 25, 1833, laid out the first planned neighborhood in the city of Boston. Sumner served as its president and later on the executive committee of the company until he retired due to ill health in 1850 at age 70.

He spent many years writing the History of East Boston, a complete account of all of the early activities there, first published in 1858.

== Personal life ==
Sumner was married three times. His first marriage was to Mary Ann (née DeWolf) Perry (1795–1834) in 1826. She was the widow of Lt. Raymond H. J. Perry of the United States Navy (brother of well-known Navy officers Oliver Hazard Perry and Matthew Calbraith Perry, all sons of Capt. Christopher Raymond Perry) and a daughter of U.S. Senator from Rhode Island James DeWolf. When he was in Boston, Sumner resided at the family house on Mount Vernon Street in Beacon Hill.

After resigning his office in 1834, he bought and moved to a large estate in Jamaica Plain. In 1836, he remarried to Maria Foster (née Doane) Greenough (d. 1843), the widow of his distant cousin, David Stoddard Greenough II.

After his second wife's death in 1843, he married thirdly to Mary Dickinson Kemble (1827–1872), a niece of Margaret Kemble Gage (wife of Gen. Thomas Gage, the last colonial Governor of Massachusetts), in 1848. Four years later in 1852, they moved to a Greek Revival and Italianate mansion on Roanoke Avenue.

Four years before his death, Sumner was stricken with paralysis and was unable to speak for a time. While he retained his mental faculties to the end, he eventually succumbed to the disease and died on October 24, 1861, in Boston. He was buried at the Forest Hills Cemetery in Jamaica Plain.

=== Legacy ===
William H. Sumner is also known for being the founder of the Massachusetts Horticultural Society. In tribute to his tireless work for East Boston, the Sumner Tunnel that runs under Boston Harbor between East Boston and Downtown Boston bears his name. Sumner Hill in Jamaica Plain and Sumner Road in Cambridge are also named for him.
