= 1797 Massachusetts gubernatorial election =

- April 3, 1797
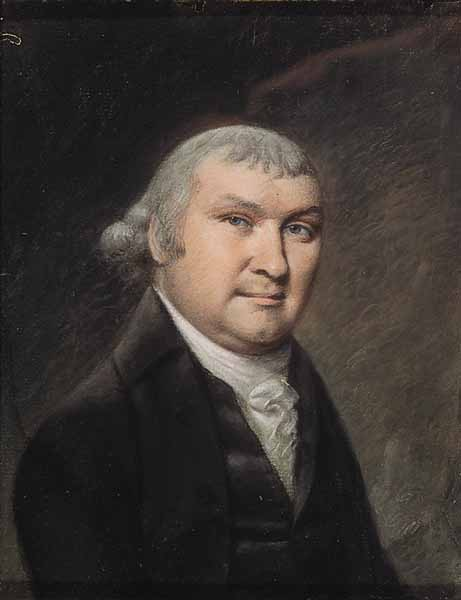

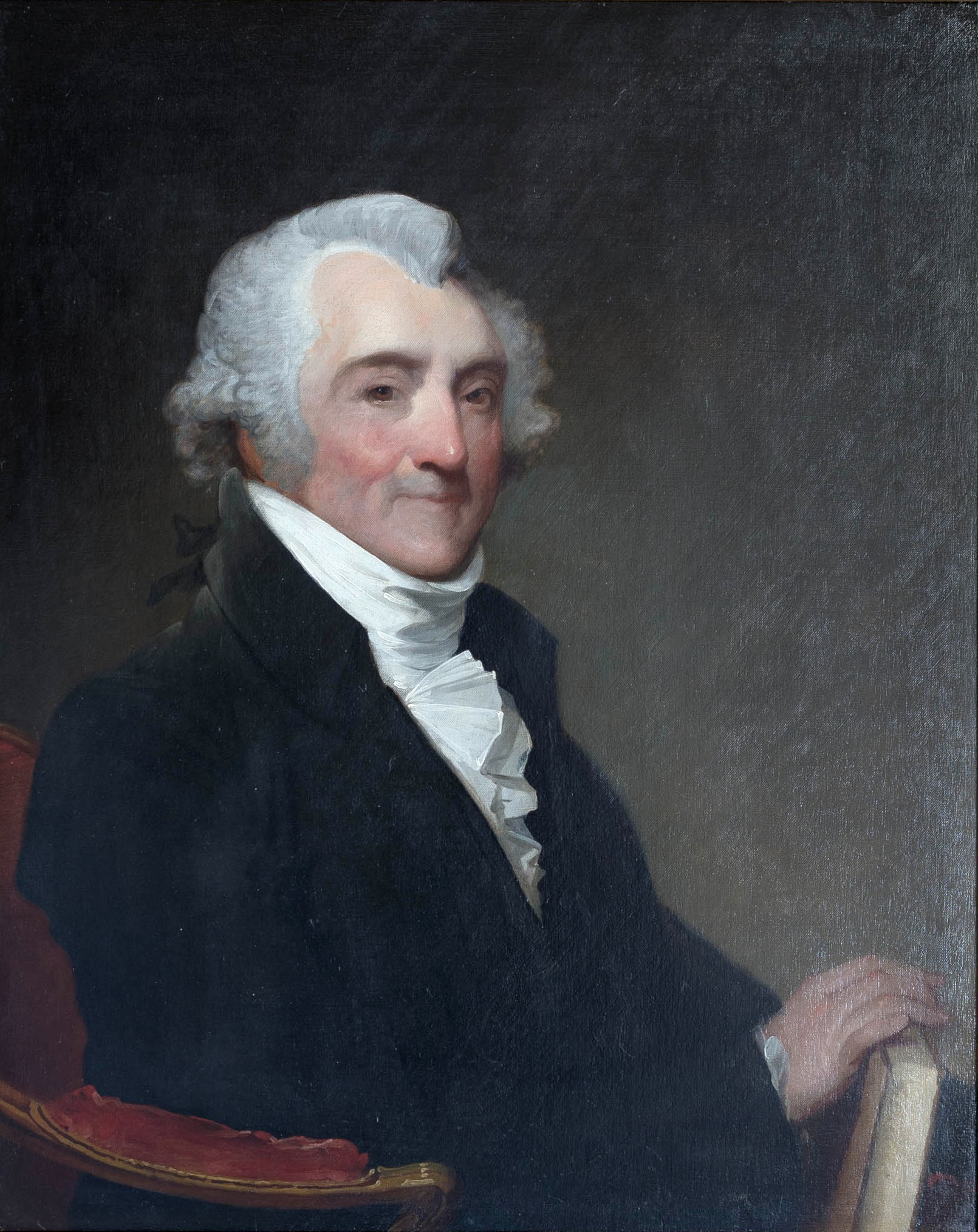

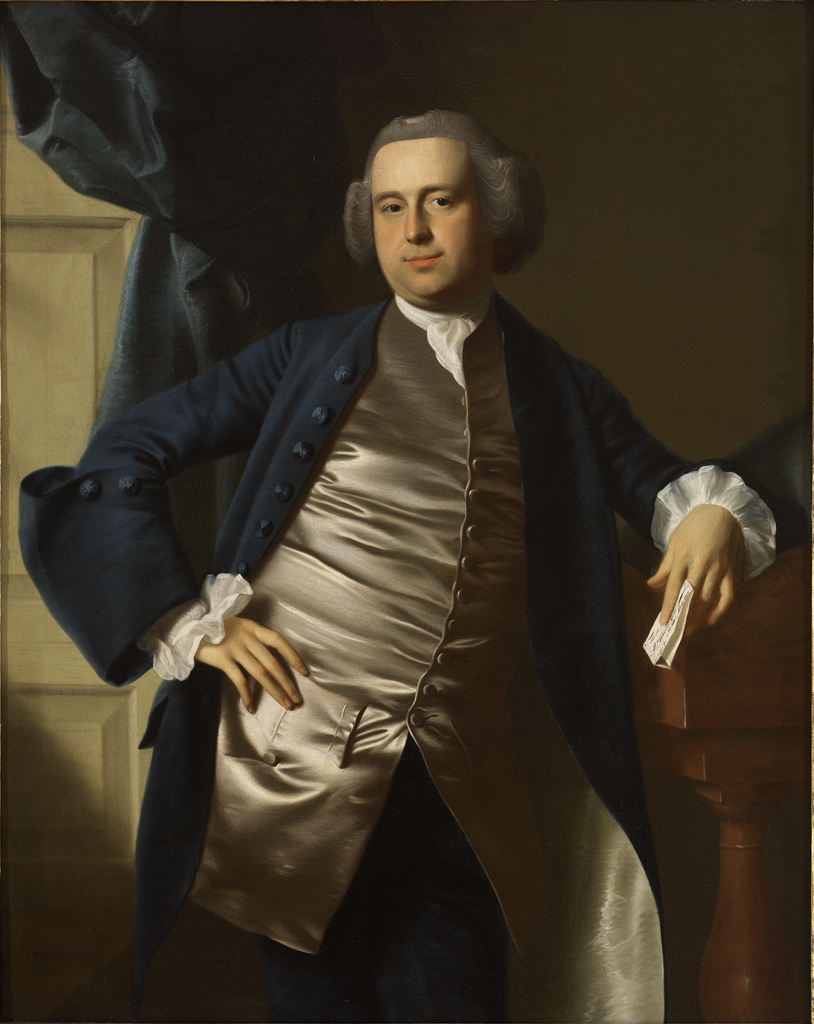
| Nominee | Increase Sumner | James Sullivan | Moses Gill |
| Party | Federalist | Democratic-Republican | Federalist |
| Popular vote | 14,540 | 7,125 | 3,559 |
| Percentage | 56.21% | 27.55% | 13.76% |
- County results Sumner: 40-50% 50-60% 60–70% 70–80% 80–90% 90–100% Sullivan: 40–50%
Governor before election
Samuel Adams
Democratic-Republican
Elected Governor
Increase Sumner
Federalist

The 1797 Massachusetts gubernatorial election was held on April 3.

Incumbent Governor Samuel Adams did not stand for election to a fourth term. The party system was still taking shape in the state, and the Federalists nominated Increase Sumner, while more populist factions that had previously supported Governors John Hancock and Samuel Adams nominated Moses Gill and James Sullivan, respectively. The principal issues in this and subsequent elections were over federal policy: specifically the national response to threats of war with Revolutionary France, and the consequent need for increased taxes to arm the nation. Sumner ultimately won a majority over the divided opposition.

== General election ==
=== Candidates ===
- Moses Gill, Lieutenant Governor of Massachusetts (Federalist)
- James Sullivan, Massachusetts Attorney General (Republican)
- Increase Sumner, Associate Justice of the Massachusetts Supreme Judicial Court (Federalist)

=== Results ===
Although Gill polled well in Boston and the eastern counties of present-day Maine, the Federalists won a decisive victory over the divided opposition.

1797 Massachusetts gubernatorial election
| Party | Candidate | Votes | % | ±% |
|---|---|---|---|---|
| Federalist | Increase Sumner (incumbent) | 14,540 | 56.21% | |
| Democratic-Republican | James Sullivan | 7,125 | 27.55% | |
| Federalist | Moses Gill | 3,559 | 13.76% | |
| Others | Scattering | 641 | 2.46% | |
| Total votes | | 25,865 | 100.00% | |
| Federalist gain from Democratic-Republican | | Swing | | |
