= 1796 Massachusetts gubernatorial election =

- April 4, 1796
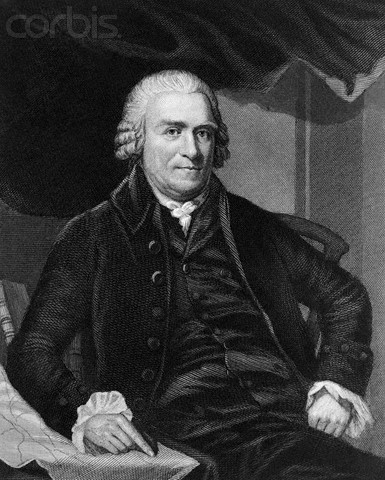

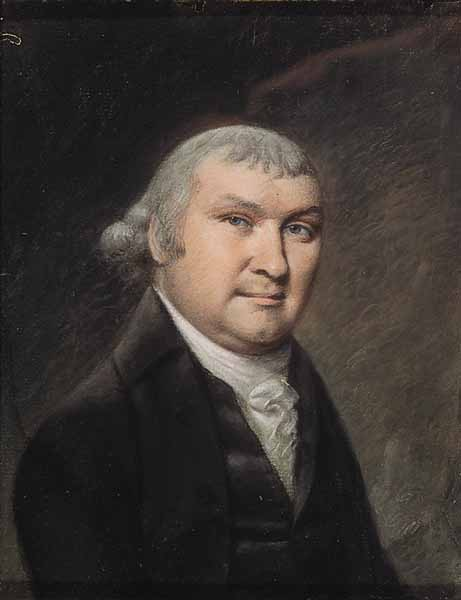
Nominee	Samuel Adams	Increase Sumner
Party	Democratic-Republican	Federalist
Popular vote	15,199	10,184
Percentage	57.37%	38.44%
- County results Adams: 50–60% 60–70% 70–80% Sumner: 50-60% 60-70%
Governor before election
Samuel Adams
Democratic-Republican
Elected Governor
Samuel Adams
Democratic-Republican

The 1796 Massachusetts gubernatorial election was held on April 4.

Incumbent Governor Samuel Adams was re-elected to a third term in office over Increase Sumner.

== General election ==
=== Candidates ===
- Samuel Adams, incumbent Governor since 1794 (Republican)
- Increase Sumner, Associate Justice of the Massachusetts Supreme Judicial Court (Federalist)

=== Results ===
1796 Massachusetts gubernatorial election
Party	Candidate	Votes	%	±%
Democratic-Republican	Samuel Adams (incumbent)	15,199	57.37%	
Federalist	Increase Sumner	10,184	38.44%	
Others	Scattering	1,110	4.19%	
Total votes		26,493	100.00%	
Democratic-Republican hold		Swing		
