= 1815 Massachusetts gubernatorial election =

- April 3, 1815
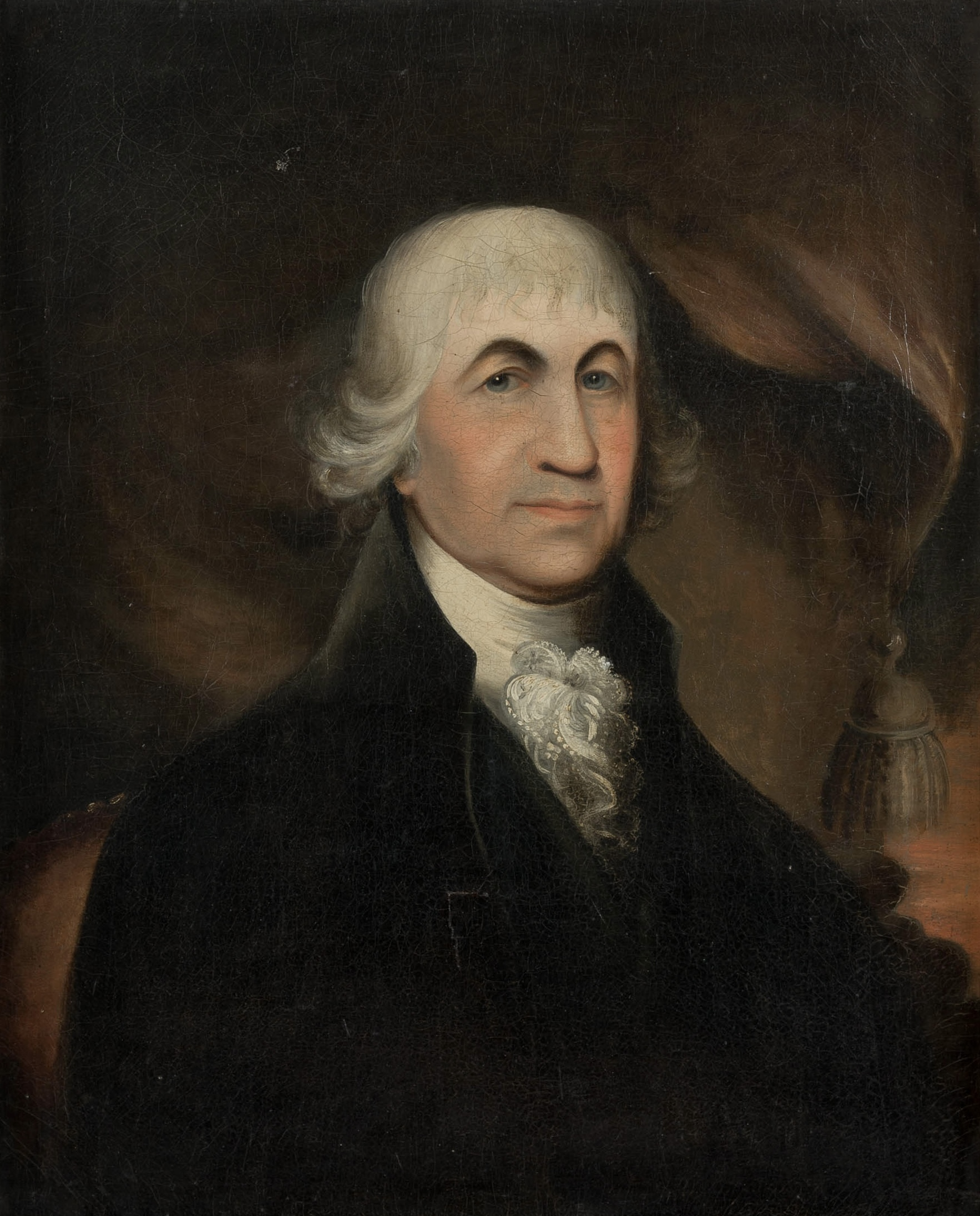

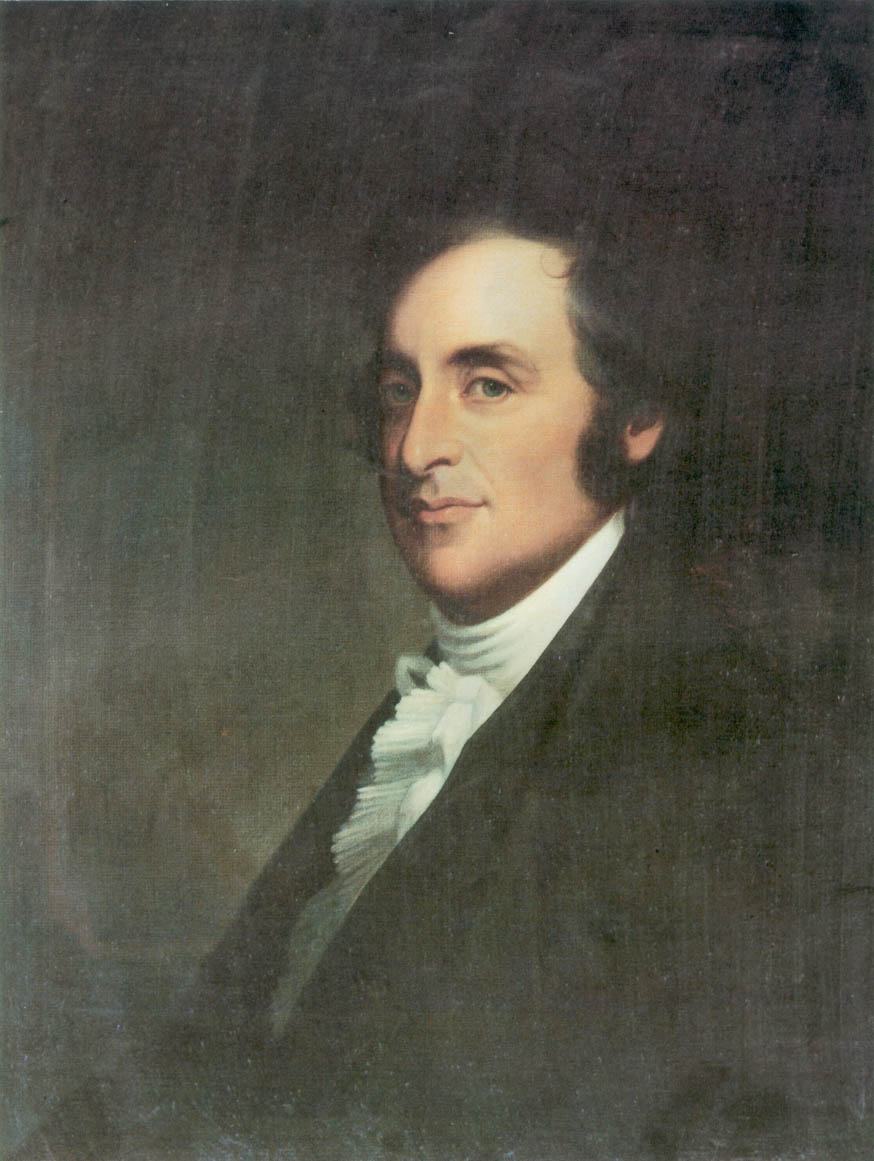
Nominee	Caleb Strong	Samuel Dexter
Party	Federalist	Democratic-Republican
Popular vote	50,921	43,938
Percentage	53.58%	46.23%
- County results Strong: 50–60% 60–70% 80–90% Dexter: 50–60% 60–70%
Governor before election
Caleb Strong
Federalist
Elected Governor
Caleb Strong
Federalist

The 1815 Massachusetts gubernatorial election was held on April 3, 1815, in order to elect the Governor of Massachusetts. Incumbent Federalist Governor Caleb Strong won re-election against Democratic-Republican candidate Samuel Dexter in a rematch of the previous election.

== General election ==
On election day, April 3, 1815, incumbent Federalist Governor Caleb Strong won re-election by a margin of 6,983 votes against his opponent Democratic-Republican candidate Samuel Dexter, thereby retaining Federalist control over the office of governor. Strong was sworn in for his eleventh overall term on May 30, 1815.

=== Results ===
Massachusetts gubernatorial election, 1815
Party	Candidate	Votes	%
Federalist	Caleb Strong (incumbent)	50,921	53.58%
Democratic-Republican	Samuel Dexter	43,938	46.23%
	Scattering	181	0.19%
Total votes		95,040	100.00%
Federalist hold			
