= 1798 Massachusetts gubernatorial election =

- April 2, 1798
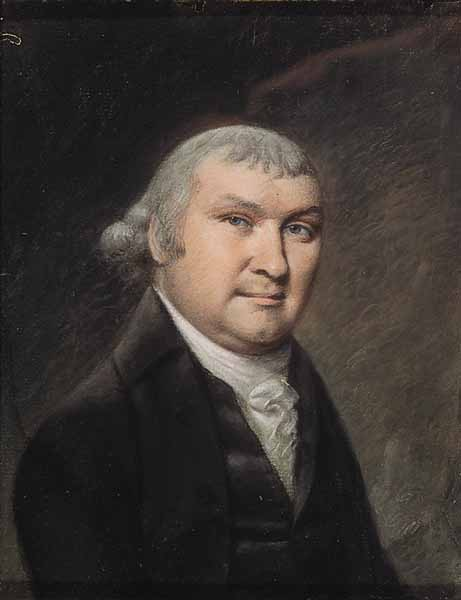

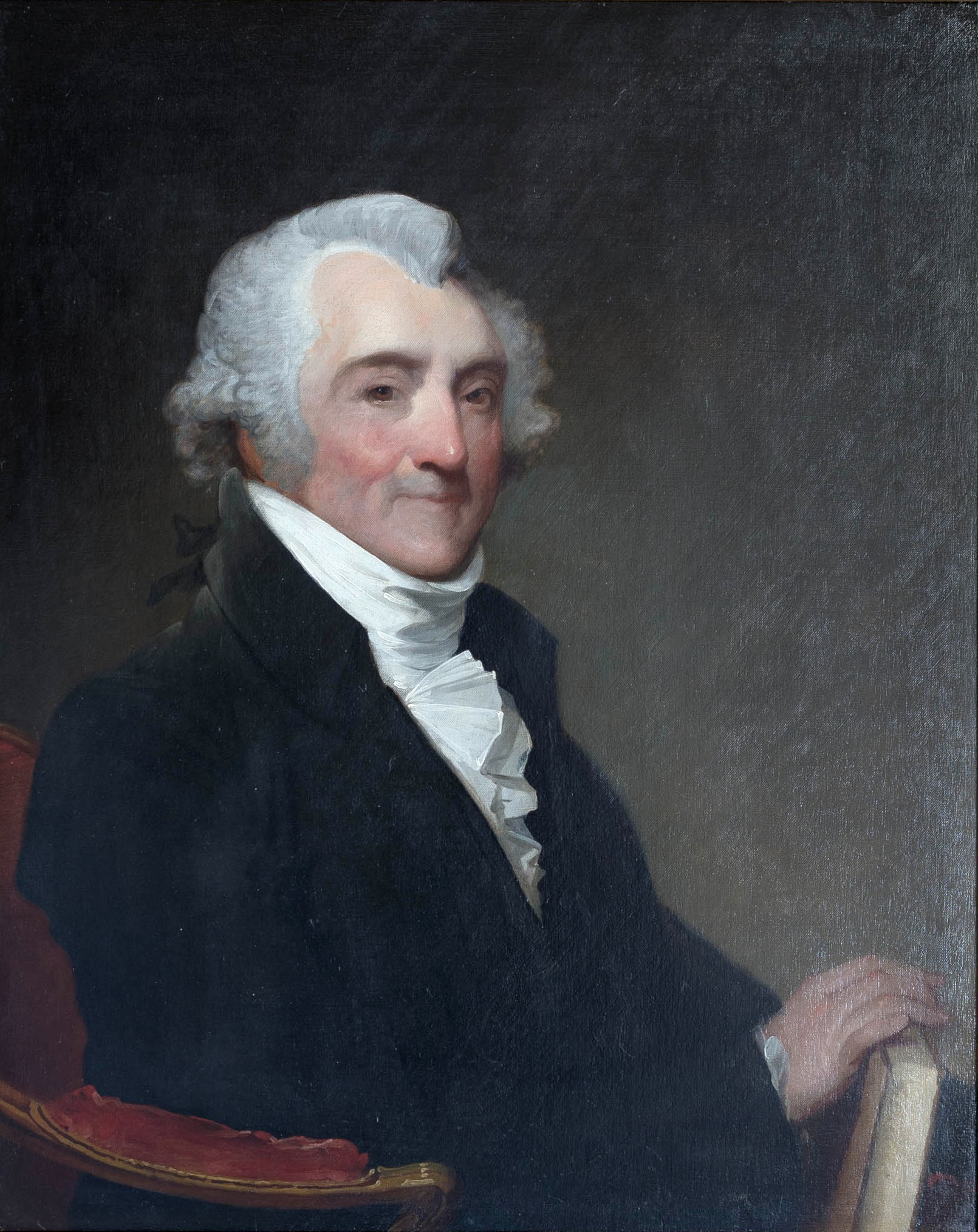
Nominee	Increase Sumner	James Sullivan
Party	Federalist	Democratic-Republican
Popular vote	18,245	6,014
Percentage	75.21%	24.79%
- County results Sumner: 50-60% 60–70% 70–80% 80–90% 90–100%
Governor before election
Increase Sumner
Federalist
Elected Governor
Increase Sumner
Federalist

The 1798 Massachusetts gubernatorial election was held on April 2.

Incumbent Governor Increase Sumner was elected to a second term in office over Attorney General James Sullivan against minimal opposition.

== General election ==
=== Candidates ===
- James Sullivan, Massachusetts Attorney General (Republican)
- Increase Sumner, incumbent Governor since 1797 (Federalist)

=== Results ===
1798 Massachusetts gubernatorial election
Party	Candidate	Votes	%	±%
Federalist	Increase Sumner (incumbent)	18,245	75.21%	
Democratic-Republican	James Sullivan	6,014	24.79%	
Total votes		24,259	100.00%	
Federalist hold		Swing		
