= 1799 Massachusetts gubernatorial election =

- April 1, 1799
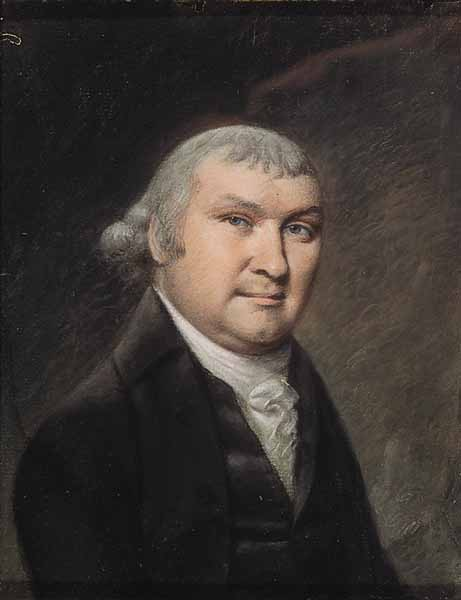

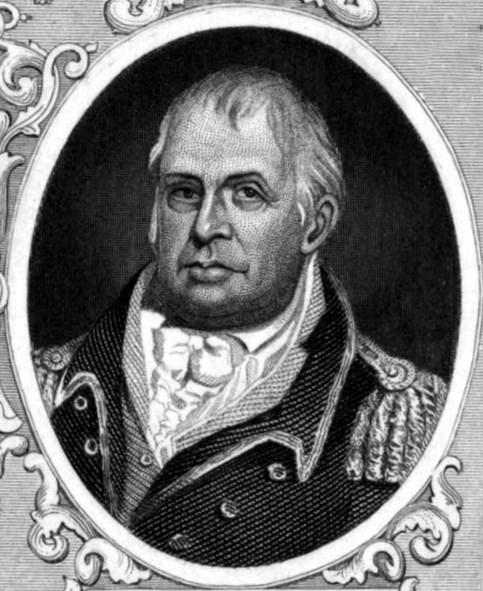
Nominee	Increase Sumner	William Heath
Party	Federalist	Democratic-Republican
Popular vote	24,073	8,484
Percentage	72.92%	25.70%
- County results Sumner: 50-60% 60–70% 80–90% 90–100% Heath: 50–60% 70–80% No Data/Vote
Governor before election
Increase Sumner
Federalist
Elected Governor
Increase Sumner
Federalist

The 1799 Massachusetts gubernatorial election was held on April 1.

Incumbent Governor Increase Sumner was elected to a third term in office against minimal opposition. Sumner won the election on his deathbed and was unable to fulfill the duties of office. To avoid provoking a constitutional crisis, he took the office in early June before dying on June 7, 1799.

== General election ==
=== Candidates ===
- William Heath, former State Senator and major general in the Continental Army (Republican)
- Increase Sumner, incumbent Governor since 1797 (Federalist)

=== Results ===
1799 Massachusetts gubernatorial election
Party	Candidate	Votes	%	±%
Federalist	Increase Sumner	24,073	72.92%	
Democratic-Republican	William Heath	8,484	25.70%	
Others	Scattering	456	1.38%	
Total votes		33,013	100.00%	
Federalist hold		Swing		
