= 1795 Massachusetts gubernatorial election =

- April 6, 1795
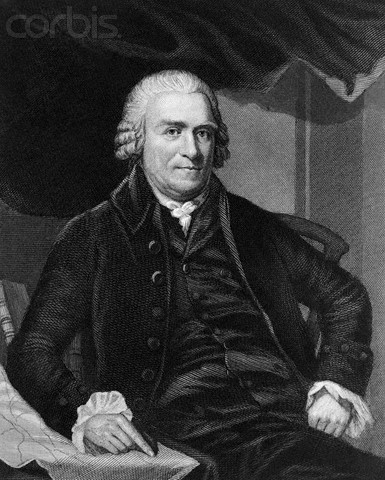
Nominee	Samuel Adams
Party	Democratic-Republican
Popular vote	15,976
Percentage	90.21%
- County results Adams: 70–80% 80–90% 90–100% No Vote/Data
Governor before election
Samuel Adams
Democratic-Republican
Elected Governor
Samuel Adams
Democratic-Republican

The 1795 Massachusetts gubernatorial election was held on April 6.

Incumbent Governor Samuel Adams was re-elected to a second term in office; opposition to Adams was not organized and did not contest the election.

== General election ==
=== Candidates ===
- Samuel Adams, incumbent Governor since 1794 (Republican)

=== Results ===
1795 Massachusetts gubernatorial election
Party	Candidate	Votes	%	±%
Democratic-Republican	Samuel Adams (incumbent)	15,976	90.21%	
Others	Scattering	1,734	9.79%	
Total votes		17,710	100.00%	
Democratic-Republican hold		Swing		
