= 1788 Massachusetts gubernatorial election =

- April 7, 1788
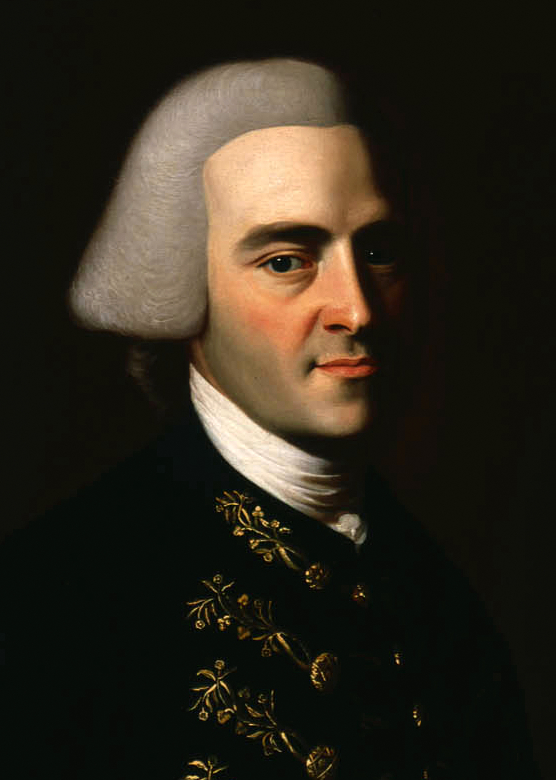

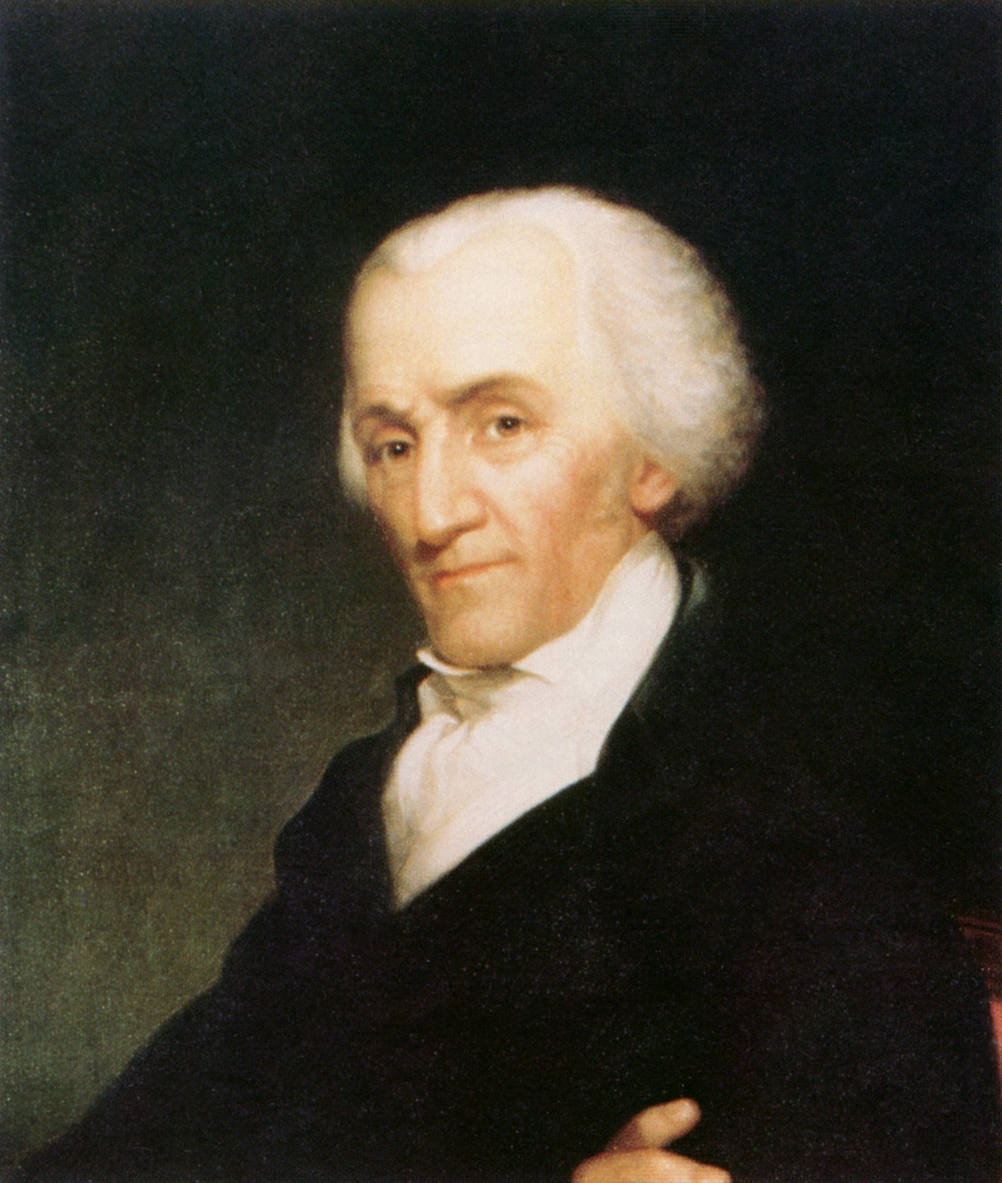
Nominee	John Hancock	Elbridge Gerry
Party	Federalists	Anti-Federalists
Popular vote	17,856	4,145
Percentage	80.53%	18.70%
- County results Hancock: 50–60% 60–70% 70–80% 80–90% 90–100% No Data/Vote
Governor before election
John Hancock
Nonpartisan
Elected Governor
John Hancock
Nonpartisan

A gubernatorial election was held in Massachusetts on April 7, 1788. John Hancock, the incumbent governor, defeated Elbridge Gerry, a former delegate to the United States Constitutional Convention.

The election took place in the immediate aftermath of a narrow vote to ratify the United States Constitution, which Hancock supported and Gerry opposed. A political moderate, Hancock's public endorsement of the Constitution was decisive in Massachusetts: although too ill to take his seat as president of the Massachusetts ratifying convention, his speech recommending adoption of the Constitution with amendments persuaded the closely-divided assembly to vote in favor of ratification. In recognition of his importance to the pro-ratification cause, the "friends of the Constitution" decided to promote the popular Hancock as the Federalists' candidate for governor; meanwhile, Gerry was put forward by the Anti-Federalists who remained skeptical of the incoming federal government. Gerry had been a delegate to the Constitutional Convention in Philadelphia, but refused to sign the final document in protest of the Three-Fifths Clause, which inflated the representation of the slave states in the United States House of Representatives, and the lack of a bill of rights. Although Gerry publicly accepted the outcome of the ratification vote, the issue of the Constitution loomed large in the gubernatorial campaign. Despite the significant opposition to ratification, Gerry was ultimately unable to overcome Hancock's immense personal popularity and was defeated by more than 12,000 votes.

== Results ==
Massachusetts gubernatorial election, 1788
Party	Candidate	Votes	%	±%
Federalists	John Hancock (incumbent)	17,856	80.53%	+5.44
Anti-Federalists	Elbridge Gerry	4,145	18.70%	New
Federalists	James Bowdoin	102	0.46%	−21.46
Anti-Federalists	James Warren	35	0.16%	+0.15
Federalists	Benjamin Lincoln	16	0.07%	−2.01
Federalists	Samuel Adams	3	0.01%	+0.01
Federalists	Nathaniel Gorham	2	0.01%	−0.32
Federalists	John Adams	1	0.00%	New
	Daniel Bimby	1	0.00%	New
	Charles Chauncey	1	0.00%	New
	Job Cushing	1	0.00%	New
Federalists	William Cushing	1	0.00%	New
	Solomon Freeman	1	0.00%	New
	Joseph Lefert	1	0.00%	New
	Nehemiah Pratt	1	0.00	New
Federalists	James Sullivan	1	0.00	New
Federalists	Artemas Ward	1	0.00%	New
	Abraham White	1	0.00%	New
Blank ballots		2	0.01%	+0.01
Total votes		22,172	100.00%	
Federalists hold				

=== By county ===
	John Hancock Federalists		Elbridge Gerry Anti-Federalists		Scattering		County total
County	Votes	Percent	Votes	Percent	Votes	Percent	County total
Barnstable	334	80.87	75	18.16	4 (Note: Bowdoin 2, John Adams 1, Lincoln 1. Manuscript returns transcribed by Lampi show single votes for Adams in both Barnstable and Hampshire counties, but only one vote for Adams in the statewide tally; meanwhile, Solomon Freeman is awarded one vote in the statewide tally, but no recorded votes in any county. This appears to be a transcription error, in which case either the vote in Barnstable County or the vote in Hampshire County was likely cast for Freeman.)	0.97	413
Berkshire	923	66.02	471	33.69	4 (Note: Bowdoin 3, Warren 1)	0.29	1,398
Bristol	875	50.23	863	49.54	4 (Note: Bowdoin 2, Pratt 1, Warren 1)	0.23	1,742
Cumberland	707	95.93	20	2.71	10 (Note: Bowdoin 7, Samuel Adams 1, Blank 2)	1.36	737
Dukes	91	100.00	—		—		91
Essex	2,268	82.35	481	17.46	5 (Note: Bowdoin 2, Lincoln 2, Bimby 1)	0.22	2,754
Hampshire	2,129	69.48	892	29.11	43 (Note: Warren 20, Bowdoin 19, Lincoln 3, John Adams 1. Manuscript returns transcribed by Lampi show single votes for Adams in both Barnstable and Hampshire counties, but only one vote for Adams in the statewide tally; meanwhile, Solomon Freeman is awarded one vote in the statewide tally, but no recorded votes in any county. This appears to be a transcription error, in which case either the vote in Barnstable County or the vote in Hampshire County was likely cast for Freeman.)	1.40	3,064
Lincoln	778	83.93	142	15.32	7 (Note: Warren 7)	0.76	927
Middlesex	2,560	89.45	292	10.20	10 (Note: Bowdoin 5, Lincoln 2, Samuel Adams 1, Gorham 1, Warren 1)	0.35	2,862
Nantucket	No votes recorded						—
Plymouth	1,068	89.37	103	8.62	24 (Note: Bowdoin 17, Warren 3, Lincoln 2, William Cushing 1, Lefert 1)	2.01	1,195
Suffolk	2,841	97.43	48	1.65	27 (Note: Bowdoin 23, Lincoln 3, White 1)	0.92	2,916
Worcester	2,866	79.61	708	19.67	26 (Note: Bowdoin 17, Lincoln 3, Samuel Adams 1, Job Cushing 1, Gorham 1, Sullivan 1, Ward 1, Warren 1)	0.72	3,600
York	416	87.95	50	10.57	7 (Note: Bowdoin 5, Chauncey 1, Warren 1)	1.48	473
TOTAL	17,856	80.53	4,145	18.70	171	0.77	22,172
