= 1789 Massachusetts gubernatorial election =

- April 6, 1789
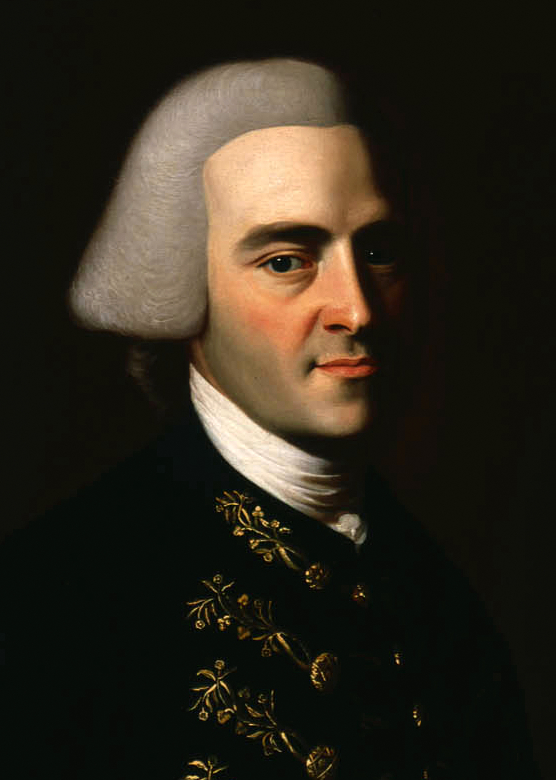

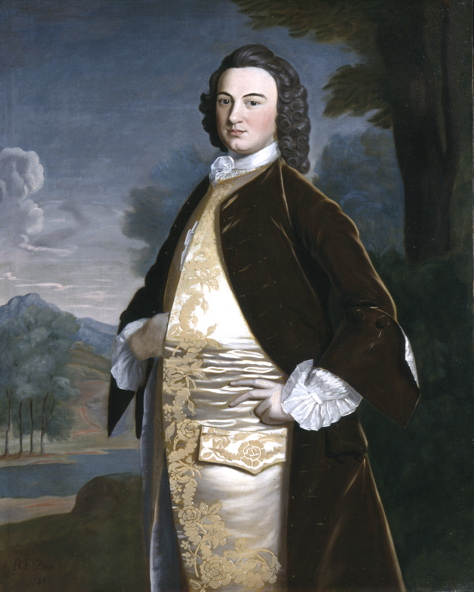
Nominee	John Hancock	James Bowdoin
Party	Nonpartisan	Nonpartisan
Popular vote	17,309	3,457
Percentage	80.57%	16.09%
- County results Hancock: 60–70% 70–80% 80–90% >90%
Governor before election
John Hancock
Nonpartisan
Elected Governor
John Hancock
Nonpartisan

A gubernatorial election was held in Massachusetts on April 6, 1789. John Hancock, the incumbent governor, defeated James Bowdoin, who had served as the second governor of Massachusetts from 1785 to 1787.

== Results ==
Massachusetts gubernatorial election, 1789
Party	Candidate	Votes	%	±%
Nonpartisan	John Hancock (incumbent)	17,309	80.57%	+0.04
Nonpartisan	James Bowdoin	3,457	16.09%	+15.63
Nonpartisan	Benjamin Lincoln	438	2.04%	+1.97
Nonpartisan	William Cushing	157	0.73%	+0.73
Nonpartisan	Samuel Adams	85	0.40%	+0.39
Nonpartisan	Nathaniel Gorham	8	0.04%	+0.03
Nonpartisan	Ebenezer Saul	7	0.03%	New
Nonpartisan	James Warren	3	0.01%	−0.15
Nonpartisan	John Adams	2	0.01%	+0.01
Nonpartisan	Martin Burk	1	0.0%	New
Nonpartisan	Lincoln Chadwick	1	0.0%	New
Nonpartisan	Nathan Fisk	1	0.0%	New
Nonpartisan	Benjamin Goddard	1	0.0%	New
Nonpartisan	Jonah Haskell	1	0.0%	New
Nonpartisan	Samuel Haskell	1	0.0%	New
Nonpartisan	Daniel Holland	1	0.0%	New
Nonpartisan	Lace	1	0.0%	New
Nonpartisan	Joseph Lyman	1	0.0%	New
Nonpartisan	Lot Nye	1	0.0%	New
Nonpartisan	Lenox Parsons	1	0.0%	New
Nonpartisan	Samuel Phillips Jr.	1	0.0%	New
Nonpartisan	Nehemiah Pratt	1	0.0%	—
Nonpartisan	J. Randall	1	0.0%	New
Nonpartisan	James Sikes	1	0.0%	New
Nonpartisan	John Taylor	1	0.0%	New
Nonpartisan	Whiting	1	0.0%	New
Total votes		21,483	100.00%	
Nonpartisan hold				

=== Results by county ===
	John Hancock Nonpartisan		James Bowdoin Nonpartisan		Scattering		County total
County	Votes	Percent	Votes	Percent	Votes	Percent	County total
Barnstable	383	92.96	24	5.82	5 (Note: Warren 3, Samuel Adams 1, Nye 1)	1.21	412
Berkshire	761	85.22	47	5.26	85 (Note: Cushing 58, Lincoln 21, Samuel Adams 4, Chadwick 1, Holland 1)	9.52	893
Bristol	1,481	94.03	65	4.13	29 (Note: Lincoln 26, Cushing 1, Pratt 1, Warren 1)	1.84	1,575
Cumberland	637	87.50	30	4.12	61 (Note: Lincoln 58, Samuel Adams 1, Lace 1, Randall 1)	8.38	728
Dukes	89	74.17	31	25.83	—		120
Essex	1,455	69.98	569	27.37	55 (Note: Lincoln 30, Cushing 17, Samuel Adams 6, John Adams 1, Phillips 1)	2.64	2,079
Hampshire	1,956	70.06	710	25.43	126 (Note: Lincoln 36, Cushing 22, Samuel Adams 57, Gorham 6, Burk 1, Lyman 1, Parsons 1, Sikes 1, Warren 1)	4.51	2,792
Lincoln	1,382	95.77	46	3.19	15 (Note: Lincoln 12, Samuel Adams 2, John Adams 1)	1.04	1,443
Middlesex	2,406	89.44	256	9.52	28 (Note: Lincoln 22, Cushing 3, Samuel Adams 2, Gorham 1)	1.04	2,690
Nantucket	83	96.51	2	2.32	1 (Note: Samuel Adams 1)	1.16	86
Plymouth	732	68.22	214	19.94	127 (Note: Lincoln 116, Saul 7, Samuel Adams 2, Cushing 1, Warren 1)	11.84	1,073
Suffolk	2,374	70.24	946	27.99	60 (Note: Lincoln 46, Cushing 11, Samuel Adams 3)	1.78	3,380
Worcester	2,876	82.71	478	13.75	123 (Note: Lincoln 70, Cushing 41, Samuel Adams 5, Gorham 1, Fisk 1, Goddard 1, Jonah Haskell 1, Samuel Haskell 1, Taylor 1, Whiting 1)	3.54	3,477
York	693	94.41	39	5.31	2 (Note: Samuel Adams 1, Cushing 1)	0.27	734
TOTAL	17,309	80.57	3,457	16.09	717	3.34	21,483
