= 1782 Massachusetts gubernatorial election =

- April 1, 1782
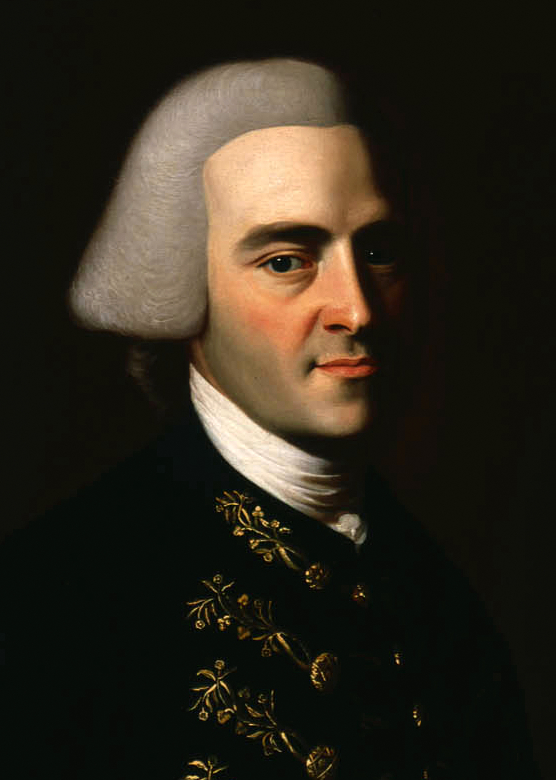

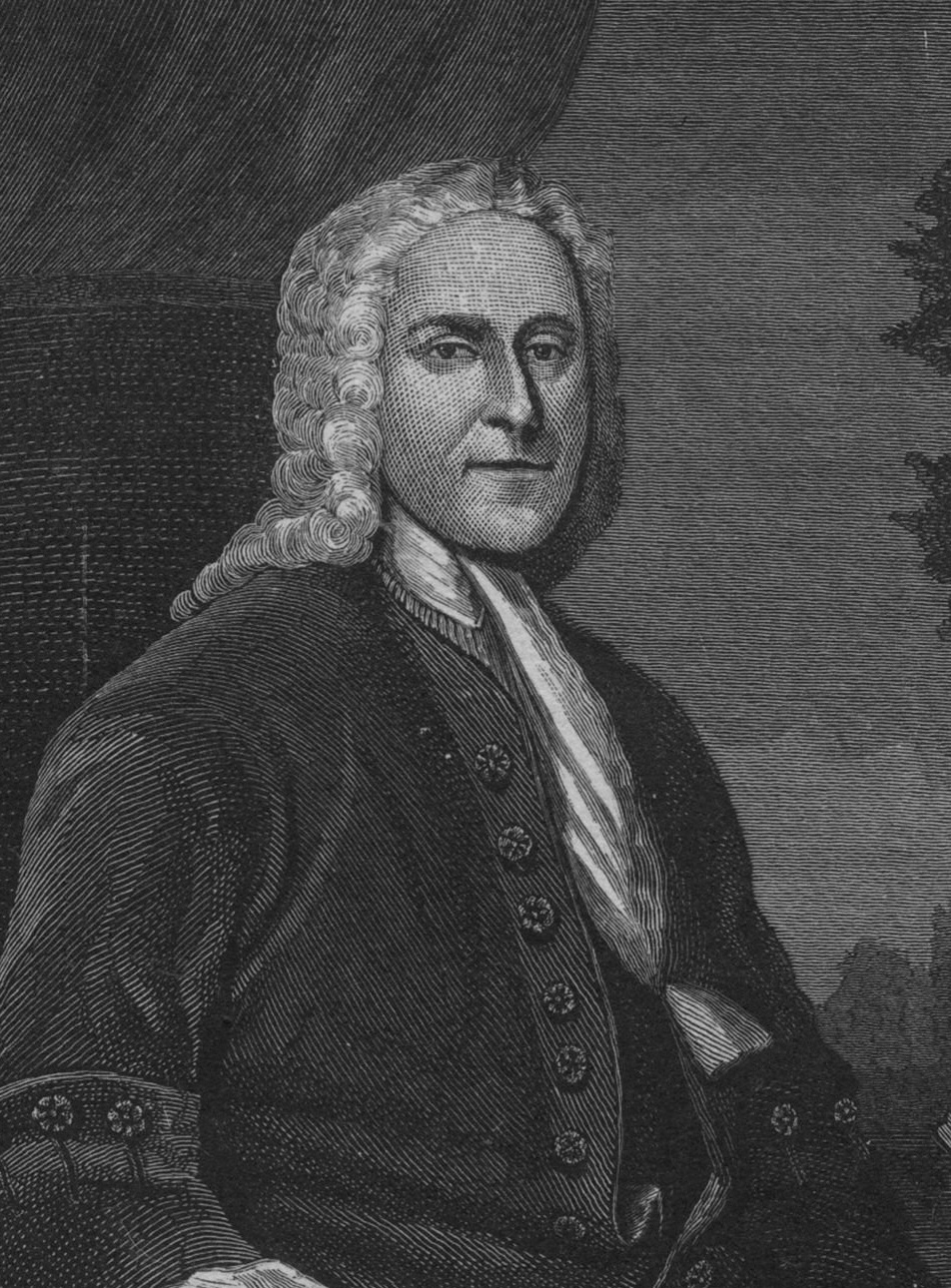
Nominee	John Hancock	Thomas Cushing
Party	Nonpartisan	Nonpartisan
Popular vote	5,855	1,129
Percentage	83.83%	16.17%
- County results Hancock: 60–70% 70–80% 80–90% 90–100% No Data/Vote
Governor before election
John Hancock
Nonpartisan
Elected Governor
John Hancock
Nonpartisan

A gubernatorial election was held in Massachusetts on April 1, 1782. John Hancock, the incumbent governor, defeated Thomas Cushing, the incumbent lieutenant governor.

== Results ==
1782 Massachusetts gubernatorial election
Party	Candidate	Votes	%	±%
Nonpartisan	John Hancock	5,855	83.83%	−9.31
Nonpartisan	Thomas Cushing	1,129	16.17%	New
Total votes		6,984	100.00%	
