= 1780 Massachusetts gubernatorial election =

- September 4, 1780
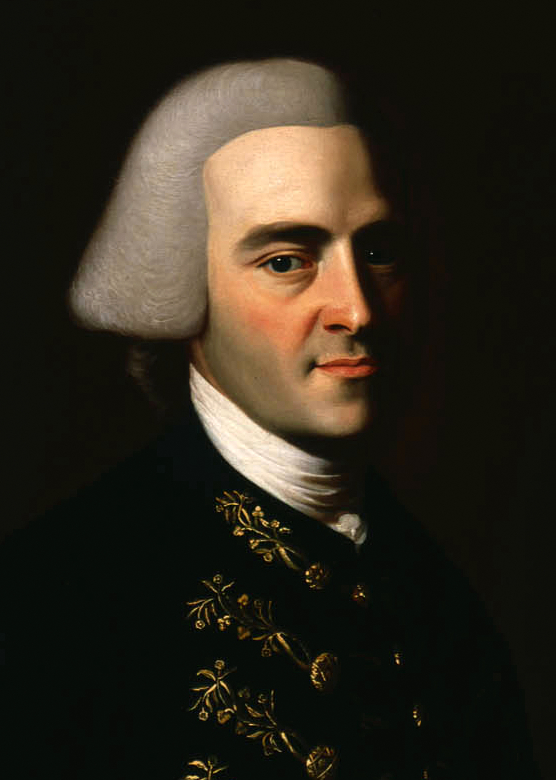

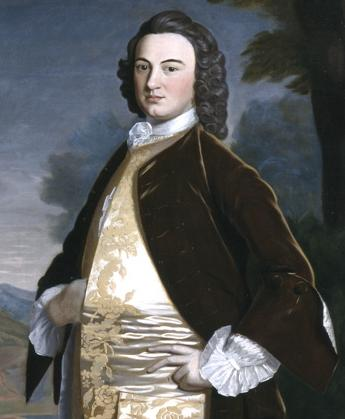
Nominee	John Hancock	James Bowdoin
Party	Nonpartisan	Nonpartisan
Popular vote	11,207	1,033
Percentage	91.56%	8.44%
- County results Hancock: 70–80% 80–90% >90% No Data/Vote
Governor before election
None (The Governor's Council administered the government.)
Elected Governor
John Hancock
Nonpartisan

A gubernatorial election was held in Massachusetts on September 4, 1780. John Hancock, the former delegate to the Continental Congress from Massachusetts, defeated James Bowdoin, the former president of the Massachusetts Constitutional Convention. The election took place against the backdrop of the American Revolutionary War, in which Hancock briefly participated as a major general of the Massachusetts militia. Hancock became the first governor elected under the Constitution of Massachusetts, ratified only the previous June; prior to the election, the Massachusetts Governor's Council administered the government following the removal of the last royal governor.

== Results ==
1780 Massachusetts gubernatorial election
Party	Candidate	Votes	%
Nonpartisan	John Hancock	11,207	91.56
Nonpartisan	James Bowdoin	1,033	8.44
Total votes		12,240	100.00
