= 1786 Massachusetts gubernatorial election =

- April 3, 1786
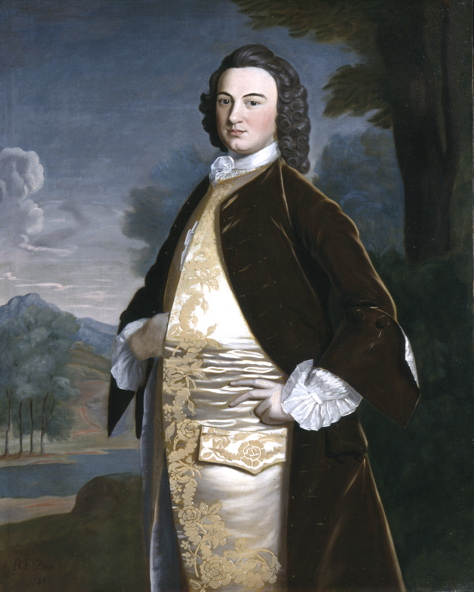

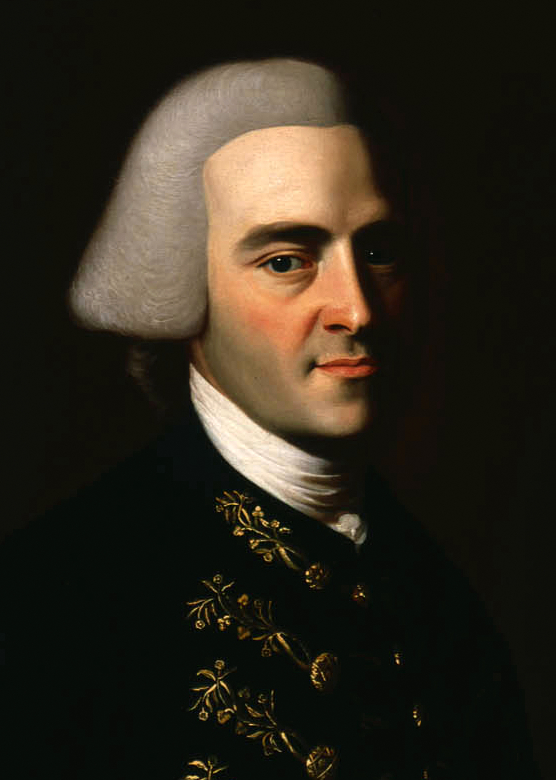
Nominee	James Bowdoin	John Hancock
Party	Nonpartisan	Nonpartisan
Popular vote	6,001	1,272
Percentage	82.51%	17.49%
- County results Bowdoin: 60–70% 80–90% 90–100% Hancock: 60–70%
Governor before election
James Bowdoin
Nonpartisan
Elected Governor
James Bowdoin
Nonpartisan

A gubernatorial election was held in Massachusetts on April 3, 1786. James Bowdoin, the incumbent governor, defeated John Hancock, the president of the Confederation Congress.

== Results ==
Massachusetts gubernatorial election, 1786
Party	Candidate	Votes	%	±%
Nonpartisan	James Bowdoin (incumbent)	6,001	82.51%	+38.44
Nonpartisan	John Hancock	1,272	17.49%	New
Write-in	Scattering	958	11.64%	−38.44
Total votes		8,231	100.00%	
Nonpartisan hold				
