= 1814 Massachusetts gubernatorial election =

- April 4, 1814
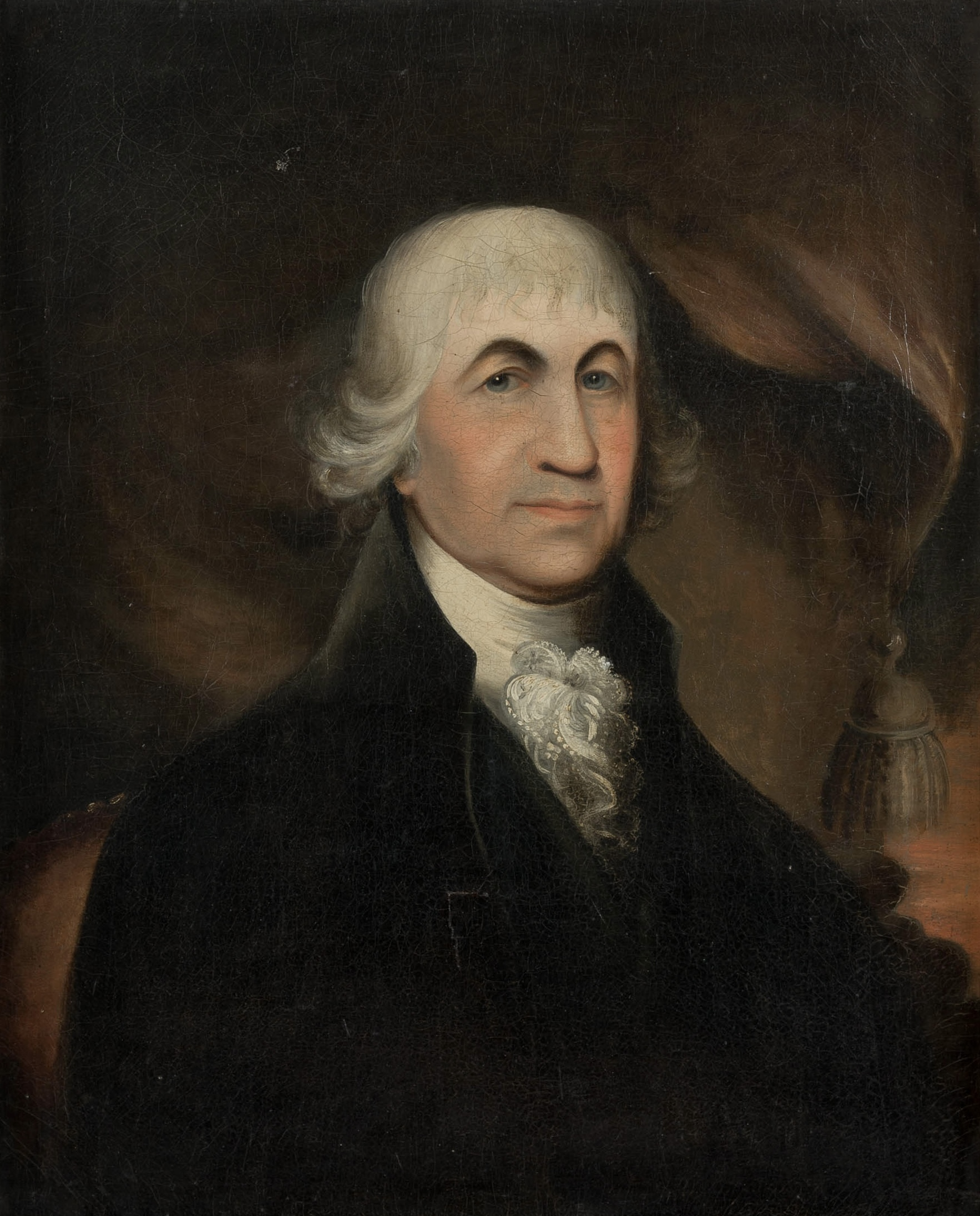

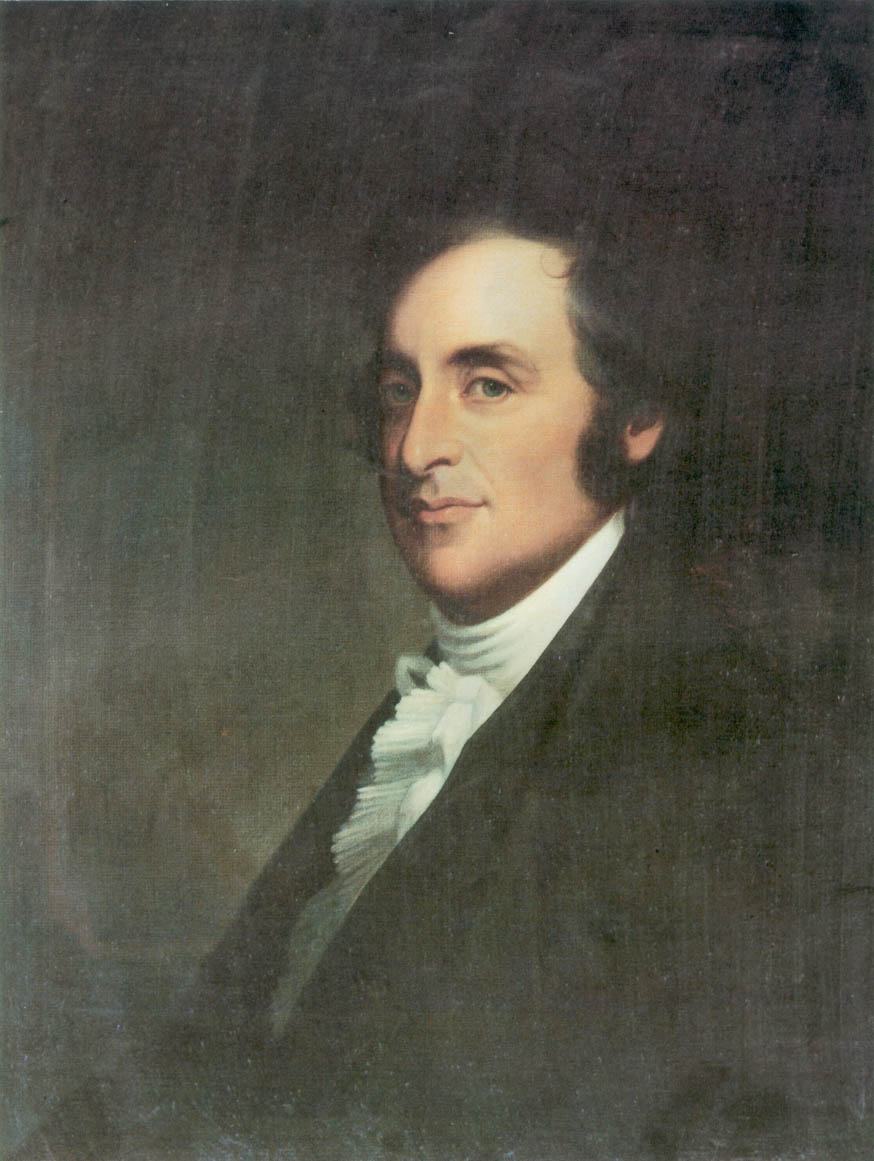
Nominee	Caleb Strong	Samuel Dexter
Party	Federalist	Democratic-Republican
Popular vote	56,374	45,953
Percentage	55.01%	44.84%
- County results Strong: 50–60% 60–70% 80–90% Dexter: 50–60% 60–70%
Governor before election
Caleb Strong
Federalist
Elected Governor
Caleb Strong
Federalist

The 1814 Massachusetts gubernatorial election was held on April 4, 1814, in order to elect the governor of Massachusetts. Incumbent Federalist Governor Caleb Strong won re-election against Democratic-Republican candidate Samuel Dexter.

== General election ==
On election day, April 4, 1814, incumbent Federalist Governor Caleb Strong won re-election by a margin of 10,421 votes against his opponent Democratic-Republican candidate Samuel Dexter, thereby retaining Federalist control over the office of governor. Strong was sworn in for his tenth overall term on May 30, 1814.

=== Results ===
Massachusetts gubernatorial election, 1814
Party	Candidate	Votes	%
Federalist	Caleb Strong (incumbent)	56,374	55.01%
Democratic-Republican	Samuel Dexter	45,953	44.84%
	Scattering	147	0.15%
Total votes		102,474	100.00%
Federalist hold			
