= William Heath =

American politician

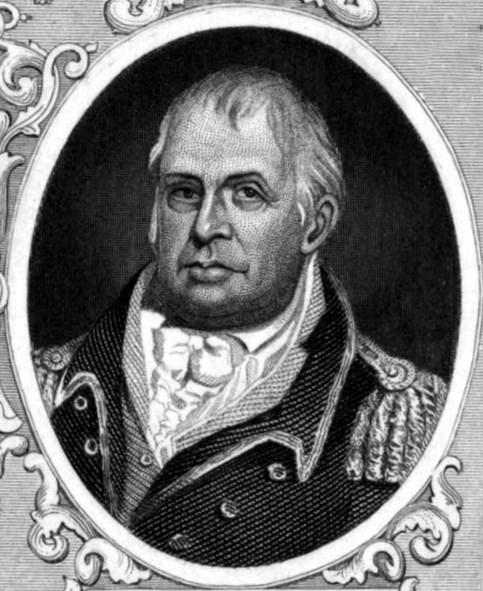
- Born: March 2, 1737
- Died: January 24, 1814 (aged 76); Roxbury, Massachusetts
- Burial place: Forest Hills Cemetery
- Military career
- Allegiance: United States
- Service/branch: Continental Army
- Rank: Major General
- Commands: Ancient and Honorable Artillery Company of Massachusetts
- Conflicts: American war of Independence; Battle of Lexington and Concord; Siege of Boston; Battle of Long Island; Battle of Harlem Heights; Battle of White Plains

William Heath (March 2, 1737 – January 24, 1814) was an American farmer, soldier, and political leader from Massachusetts who served as a major general in the Continental Army during the American Revolutionary War.

== Life and career ==
Heath made his home for his entire life at his family's farm in Roxbury, Massachusetts (present day Jamaica Plain, Massachusetts, part of the city of Boston). He was born on a farm that had been settled in 1636 by his ancestors. He became active in the militia, and was a captain of the Roxbury Company of the Suffolk County militia regiment in 1760. By 1770 he was the regiment's colonel and its commanding officer.

In 1765 he was elected as a member of the Ancient and Honorable Artillery Company of Massachusetts and was elected as the company's lieutenant in 1768 and as its captain in 1770.

In December 1774 the revolutionary government in Massachusetts commissioned him as a brigadier general. He commanded Massachusetts forces during the last stage of the Battle of Lexington and Concord in April 1775. As the siege of Boston began, Heath devoted himself to training the militia involved in the siege. In June of that year, Massachusetts named him a major general in the state troops, and the Continental Congress commissioned him a brigadier general in the newly formed Continental Army.

In 1776 Heath participated in the defense of New York City, and was one of those who urged General Washington not to abandon the city. He saw action at Long Island, Harlem Heights, and White Plains. In August 1776 he was promoted to major general in the Continental Army, but Washington had doubts about Heath's abilities and posted him where no action was expected. In November he was placed in command of forces in the Hudson River Highlands. In January 1777, Washington instructed Heath to attack Fort Independence in New York in support of Washington's actions at Trenton and Princeton, but Heath's attack was botched and his troops were routed. He was censured by Washington and thereafter was never given command of troops in combat.

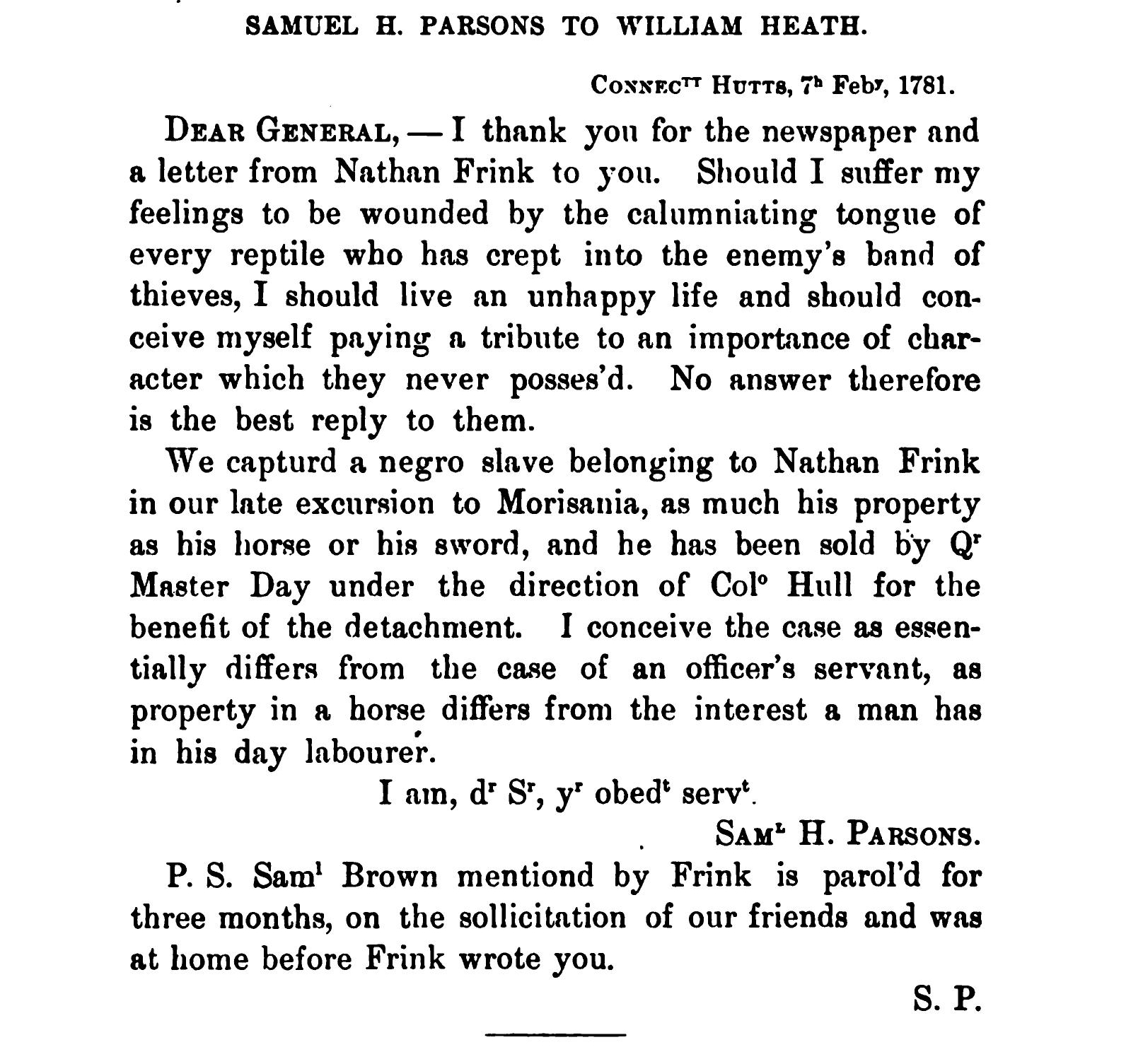
In February 1781, Gnl. Parsons wrote to Gnl. Heath, referencing a letter that Nathan Frink had written to Heath insulting Parsons. Parsons notes that they have captured "a negro slave" belonging to Frink and sold him to raise funds for to benefit the soldiers involved.

General Heath was placed in charge of the Convention Army of John Burgoyne’s surrendered troops after the Battle of Saratoga. In 1780, he returned to command the fortifications at West Point in the Highland Department after Benedict Arnold's betrayal.

He was admitted as an original member of The Society of the Cincinnati in the state of Massachusetts when it was established in 1783.

After the war, Heath was a member of the Massachusetts Convention that ratified the United States Constitution in 1788. He served in the Massachusetts Senate from 1791 to 1792, and as a probate court judge. He was also a candidate for Congress in 1792 and 1798, and was the Democratic-Republican nominee in the 1799 gubernatorial election. In 1806 he was elected the Lieutenant Governor of Massachusetts, but declined the office.

He died at his home in Roxbury on January 24, 1814, and was buried nearby in Forest Hills Cemetery. The town of Heath, Massachusetts, is named in his honor. A street in the west Bronx is named in his honor.
