= Increase Sumner =

American judge and politician (1746–1799)

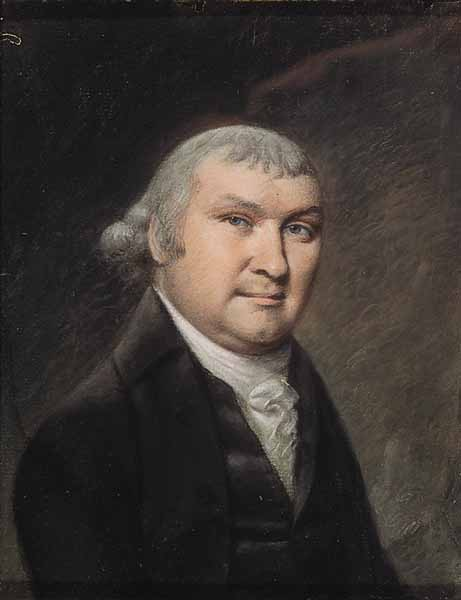
- Painting by James Sharples

5th Governor of Massachusetts
- In office June 2, 1797 – June 7, 1799
- Lieutenant: Moses Gill
- Preceded by: Samuel Adams
- Succeeded by: Moses Gill (acting)

Associate Justice of the Massachusetts Supreme Judicial Court
- In office 1782–1797
- Nominated by: John Hancock
- Preceded by: James Sullivan
- Succeeded by: Theophilus Bradbury

Personal details
- Born: November 27, 1746 Roxbury, Province of Massachusetts Bay
- Died: June 7, 1799 (aged 52) Roxbury, Massachusetts, U.S.
- Party: Federalist
- Spouse: Elizabeth Hyslop (m. 1779)
- Relatives: Sumner family
- Education: Harvard College

Increase Sumner (November 27, 1746 – June 7, 1799) was an American lawyer, jurist, and politician from Massachusetts. He was the fifth governor of Massachusetts, serving from 1797 to 1799. Trained as a lawyer, he served in the provisional government of Massachusetts during the American Revolutionary War, and was elected to the Confederation Congress in 1782. Appointed to the Massachusetts Supreme Judicial Court the same year, he served there as an associate justice until 1797.

He was elected governor of Massachusetts three times by wide margins, but died shortly after the start of his third term. His descendants include his son William H. Sumner, for whom the Sumner Tunnel in Boston, Massachusetts, is named, and 20th-century diplomats Sumner Welles and Sumner Gerard.

== Early life ==
Increase Sumner was born on November 27, 1746, in Roxbury, Province of Massachusetts Bay, one of eight children of Increase Sumner and Sarah Sharp. The elder Increase Sumner was a successful farmer descended from early settlers of Dorchester; he held a number of public offices including coroner for Suffolk County, and selectman of Roxbury.

In 1752 Sumner enrolled in the grammar school in Roxbury, now Roxbury Latin School, where the headmaster was William Cushing, future justice of the Supreme Court of the United States. Sumner excelled at school, and over the resistance of his father (who envisioned his son's future to be in agriculture) was enrolled at Harvard College in 1763. He graduated in 1767.

== Legal career ==
After graduating from Harvard, Sumner took charge of the Roxbury school, where he taught for two years while he apprenticed law under Samuel Quincy, the provincial solicitor general. He sought to study under John Adams, but the latter had enough students. Adams wrote that Sumner "was a promising genius, and a studious and virtuous youth." Sumner was admitted to the bar in 1770 and opened a law office in Roxbury that year.

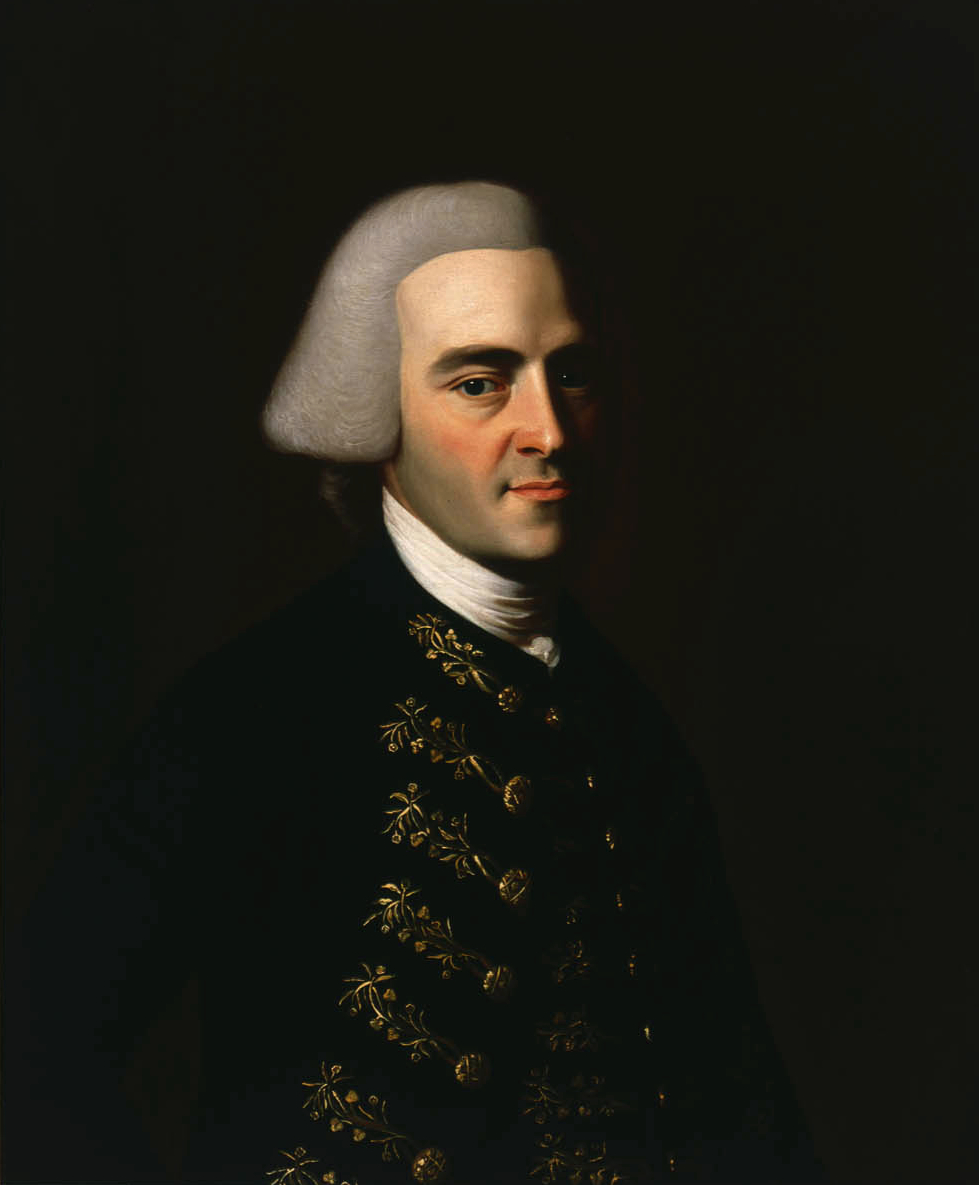
John Hancock appointed Sumner to the Massachusetts Supreme Judicial Court

Sumner was chosen a member of the Massachusetts Provincial Congress in 1776 where he represented the town of Roxbury. In 1777 he participated in a state convention to draft a new constitution, whose result was not adopted. He continued to serve in the provincial congress until the state constitution was adopted in 1780, when he was elected state senator for Suffolk County. This post he held for two years. In June 1782 he was elected to the Confederation Congress by the state legislature, replacing Timothy Danielson, who resigned, but Sumner never actually took the seat. In August 1782 Governor John Hancock nominated him as an associate justice of the Massachusetts Supreme Judicial Court to replace James Sullivan. He accepted this position instead of the senate seat, and served from 1782 to 1797. Details on his judicial record are sparse, in part because few official court records survive from the time, and decisions were usually oral (the court did not begin formal record keeping with written decisions until 1805). Sumner did take detailed notes of many of the cases he heard; these notes, preserved at the Massachusetts Historical Society, now form a valuable repository of early Massachusetts judicial history.

The period when he served in the Supreme Judicial Court included a time of great turmoil in Massachusetts. Following the American Revolutionary War the value of the paper currency then in circulation fell significantly leaving many citizens in financial difficulties. The administration of James Bowdoin in 1786 raised taxes to pay the public debt which had run up during the war, and stepped up collection of back taxes. These economic pressures led to outbreaks of civil unrest which culminated in Shays' Rebellion, an uprising in central and western Massachusetts lasting from 1786 to 1787. Sumner sat on the criminal cases in which participants of the rebellion were tried. Many participants were pardoned, but eighteen were convicted and sentenced to death. Most of these sentences were commuted; two men were hanged.

Sumner sat on the court when it heard the appeals in the Quock Walker cases in 1783, concerning a former slave who was seeking confirmation of his freedom. A ruling in one of these cases confirmed that the state constitution had effectively abolished slavery. In 1785 he was chosen by the legislature to sit on a committee which revised the laws of the state, to modernize them and remove references to British authority. In 1789 he was a member of the state convention that met to ratify the United States Constitution, in which he explained to the convention the meaning and importance of habeas corpus. He was elected a Fellow of the American Academy of Arts and Sciences in 1791.

== Governor of Massachusetts ==
In 1795 some factions of the Federalist Party sought to promote Sumner as a candidate for governor, but he was not formally nominated, and Governor Samuel Adams was reelected. The following year Sumner was actively promoted by the Federalists, but Adams was able to prevail by a comfortable margin. The campaign was not very divisive: Sumner was presented as comparatively youthful alternative to the aging Adams. Sumner wrote afterwards that Adams "has waded through a sea of political troubles and grown old in labors for the good of his country."

Adams' popularity, however, was declining, and he decided not to run for reelection in 1797. A number of popular figures were raised as nominees, and in that year's election, Sumner won the vote with 15,000 out of a total of 25,000 votes cast against a divided opposition. On June 2 Sumner rode from his home in Roxbury accompanied by 300 citizens on horseback to the State House in Boston, where the Secretary of the Commonwealth proclaimed his governorship from the eastern balcony. Sumner was the last governor to preside in what is now called the Old State House as the seat of government was moved to the New State House the following year.

Sumner was reelected in 1798 and 1799 against minimal opposition. His popularity as governor was seen by his garnering a larger share of the vote for his third term, where he won 17,000 out of 21,000 votes cast, receiving unanimous votes in 180 towns out of 393 in the state. During Sumner's period in office the state was principally preoccupied with the threat of attack by France as a result of the ongoing naval Quasi-War. Comparatively younger and more vigorous than his predecessors, Sumner actively built up the state militia and worked to ensure its preparedness in case of attack.

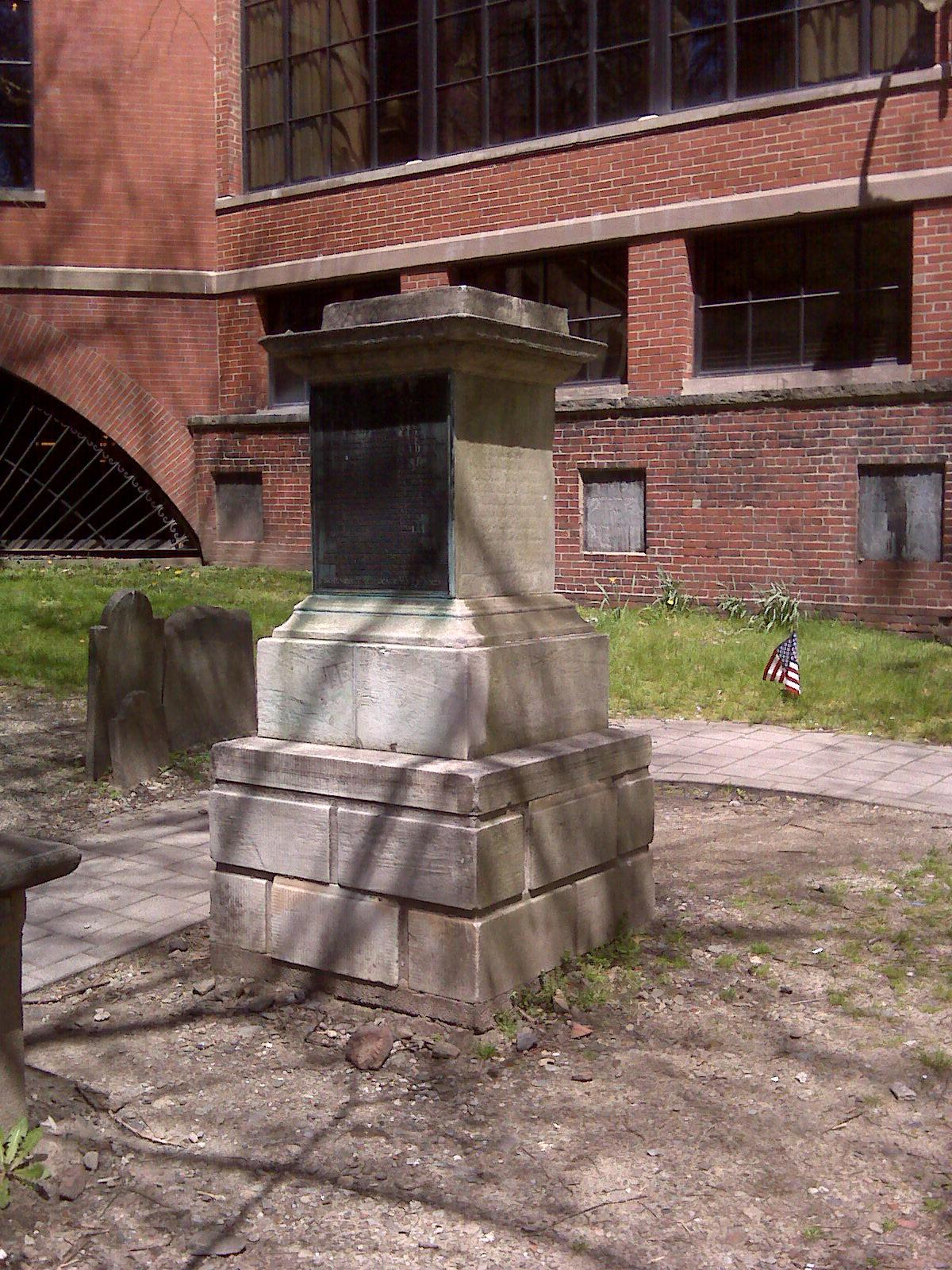
Sumner's grave in the Granary Burying Ground, Boston, 2009

Sumner never assumed the duties of office after winning the 1799 election as he was sick on his death bed at the time. In order to avoid constitutional issues surrounding the succession to the governor's office, he managed to take the oath of office in early June. He died in office from angina pectoris, aged 52 on June 7, 1799. His funeral, with full military honors, took place on June 12, and was attended by United States President John Adams. The funeral procession which included four regiments of militia ran from the governor's Roxbury mansion to a service at the Old South Meeting House. He is interred at the northerly corner of Boston's Granary Burying Ground. The brass epitaph indicates:

Here repose the remains of Increase Sumner. He was born at Roxbury, November 27, 1746, and died at the same place, June 7, 1799 in the 53rd year of his age. He was for sometime a practitioner at the bar; and for fifteen years an associate judge of the supreme judicial court; was thrice elected governor of Massachusetts in which office he died. As a lawyer he was faithful and able. As a judge, patient, impartial and decisive. As a chief magistrate, accessible, frank and decisive. In private life, he was affectionate and mild. In public life was dignified and firm. Party feuds were allayed by the correctness of his conduct. Calumny was silenced by the weight of his virtues and rancour softened by the amenity of his manners in the vigour of intellectual attainments and in the midst of usefulness. He was called by Divine Providence to rest with his fathers and went down to the chambers of death in the full belief that the grave is the pathway to future existence.

The lieutenant governor, Moses Gill, became acting governor and ran the state until elections were held in 1800.

== Family and legacy ==
Coat of Arms of Increase Sumner

Sumner was married on September 30, 1779, to Elizabeth Hyslop, daughter of William Hyslop. Upon his father-in-law's death, Sumner inherited a sizable estate which allowed him to maintain a dignified lifestyle during his public service. The couple had three children; his son William H. Sumner is well known for his efforts to develop what is now East Boston and for whom Boston's Sumner Tunnel is named. His later descendants include Sumner Welles, a 20th-century diplomat and advisor to President Franklin Delano Roosevelt, and Sumner Gerard, a 20th-century diplomat, Montana politician, and U.S. Ambassador to Jamaica. Sumner, Maine, incorporated while he was governor in 1798, was named in his honor.

Sumner was described by his son as a talented and practical farmer and an excellent horseman. He was fond of agriculture and personally grafted an entire orchard of fruit trees on his farm. He was a member of the American Academy of Arts and Sciences and president of the board of trustees of the Roxbury Latin School.

At his confirmation hearings in 2017, U.S. Supreme Court Justice Neil Gorsuch recalled being moved by reading Sumner's gravestone as a law student at Harvard. Gorsuch closed his opening statement by reading a portion of Sumner's epitaph and adding "[T]hose words stick with me. I keep them on my desk. They serve for me as a daily reminder of the law's integrity, that a useful life can be led in its service, of the hard work it takes, and an encouragement to good habits when I fail and when I falter. At the end of it all, I can ask for nothing more than to be described as he was. And if confirmed, I pledge to you that I will do everything in my power to be that man."

== Notes ==
Party political offices
| Preceded by William Cushing | Federalist nominee for Governor of Massachusetts; 1796, 1797, 1798, 1799 | Succeeded by Caleb Strong |
Legal offices
| Preceded by James Sullivan | Associate Justice of the Massachusetts Supreme Judicial Court; 1782–1797 | Succeeded by Theophilus Bradbury |
Political offices
| Preceded by Samuel Adams | Governor of Massachusetts; June 2, 1797 – June 7, 1799 | Succeeded by Moses Gill as acting governor |
