= Frederic T. Greenhalge =

American politician (1842-1896)

Frederic Thomas Greenhalge
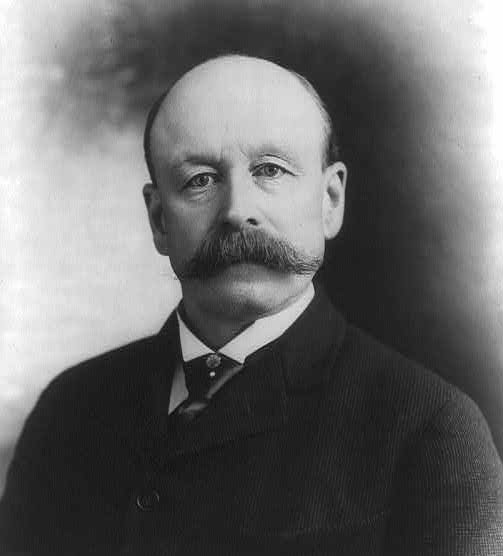
- Greenhalge in 1893

38th Governor of Massachusetts
- In office January 4, 1894 – March 5, 1896
- Lieutenant: Roger Wolcott
- Preceded by: William E. Russell
- Succeeded by: Roger Wolcott

Member of the U.S. House of Representatives from Massachusetts's 8th district
- In office March 4, 1889 – March 3, 1891
- Preceded by: Charles Herbert Allen
- Succeeded by: Moses T. Stevens

Mayor of Lowell, Massachusetts
- In office 1880–1881

Member of the Massachusetts House of Representatives
- In office 1885

Personal details
- Born: Frederic Thomas Greenhalg; July 19, 1842 Clitheroe, England, U.K.
- Died: March 5, 1896 (aged 53) Lowell, Massachusetts, U.S.
- Party: Republican
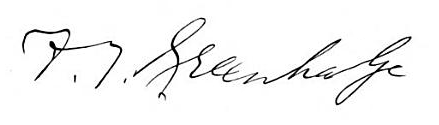
- Signature

Frederic Thomas Greenhalge (born Greenhalgh) (July 19, 1842 – March 5, 1896) was an American lawyer and politician in Massachusetts. He served in the United States House of Representatives and was the 38th governor of Massachusetts. He was elected three consecutive times, but died early in his third term. He was the state's first foreign-born governor.

== Early years ==
Frederic Thomas Greenhalge was born in Clitheroe, Lancashire, England, U.K. on July 19, 1842, to William Greenhalgh and Jane (Slater) Greenhalgh. He was the only son (of seven children). His father, the supervisor of a printing operation, was descended from the Greenhalghs, a family of longstanding note in Lancashire. The family moved first to Eshton and then Edenfield, where the young Greenhalge (who would change the spelling of his name as an adult) attended private school. In 1855 the family immigrated to Lowell, Massachusetts, where the father had been offered a job heading the printing department of the Merrimack Manufacturing Company.

Greenhalge attended the public schools of Lowell, where he excelled academically and participated in debating societies. In 1859, he enrolled in Harvard College, where he was a member of the Institute of 1770 and was well regarded as a debater. He left Harvard after three years because his father died, the family finances having suffered a setback due mill closures caused by the American Civil War. He briefly taught school in Chelmsford, Massachusetts, and studied law. In 1863, he sought to enlist in the Union Army, but was rejected on account of poor health. He instead secured a civilian job work as a commissary for the army at New Bern, North Carolina. There he contracted malaria, and was sent home in April 1864. He resumed his study of the law, was admitted to the bar in Lowell in 1865.

On October 1, 1872, Greenhalge married Isabella (or Isabel) Nesmith, the daughter of John Nesmith, Lieutenant Governor of Massachusetts during the war. They had three children: Nesmith Greenhalge (1873–1874), Frederic B. Greenhalge (1875–?), and Harriet Nesmith Greenhalge (1878–?).

== Political career ==
Greenhalge served on Lowell's common council in 1868 and 1869. He then became a member of the school committee in 1871, holding that post until 1873. In addition to his legal practice, he also served as a judge in the Lowell Police Court from 1874 to 1884. He was politically a reform-oriented Republican, but supported Horace Greeley in the 1872 presidential election. That year, he also ran unsuccessfully for the Massachusetts Senate as a Democrat.

Greenhalge was elected mayor of Lowell in 1880 and 1881 and was an unsuccessful candidate for election to the Massachusetts Senate in 1881. He was a delegate to the Republican National Convention in 1884 and a member of the Massachusetts House of Representatives in 1885 but was unsuccessful in his bid for reelection. He became city solicitor in 1888, practicing law in Middlesex and other counties. He was elected as a Republican to the Fifty-first Congress, serving from March 4, 1889, to March 3, 1891, but failed in 1890 to be re-elected to Congress, a casualty of that year's Democratic landslide.

In 1893, Greenhalge ran for Governor of Massachusetts. He was opposed for the Republican nomination by Albert E. Pillsbury, a member of the reform-oriented Mugwump wing of the party. Pillsbury was opposed by the powerful Senator-elect Henry Cabot Lodge, and Greenhalge was chosen as a relatively safe candidate against the Democrat John E. Russell. Russell was not as popular as the outgoing Democratic governor William E. Russell (no relation), and the Democrats were further hurt by the start of the Panic of 1893. Greenhalge won an easy victory. He was the state's first foreign-born governor.

Greenhalge served in the office from January 1894, winning reelection until his death in 1896. While governor, the Commonwealth paid off its last public debt and he proclaimed the first Patriots' Day, ending the 200-year-old Fast Day celebration in Massachusetts. Perhaps his greatest test in office came in February 1894 when an angry mob of 5,000 gathered in front of the State House to demand unemployment subsidies; he came out of his office to address them and promise them relief, whereupon their anger subsided.

Greenhalge fell ill with kidney disease early into his third term as governor, and died in office on March 5, 1896; businesses and schools closed in his honor. At his funeral Senator Henry Cabot Lodge and Harvard President Charles William Eliot served as pallbearers; he is buried in Lowell Cemetery.

== See also ==
- List of United States governors born outside the United States

== Sources ==
- Abrams, Richard (1964). Conservatism in a Progressive Era: Massachusetts Politics 1900-1912. Cambridge, MA: Harvard University Press. OCLC 475077.
- Beauchesne, James (1999). "Greenhalge, Frederic Thomas". Dictionary of American National Biography. Vol. 9. New York: Oxford University Press. pp. 537–538. ISBN 9780195206357. OCLC 39182280.
- Hart, Albert Bushnell, ed. (1927). Commonwealth History of Massachusetts. New York: The States History Company. OCLC 1543273. (five volume history of Massachusetts until the early 20th century)
- Nesmith, James (1897). The Life and Work of Frederic T. Greenhalge: Governor of Massachusetts. Boston: Roberts Bros. p. 11. OCLC 4386307.

Party political offices
Preceded by William H. Haile	Republican nominee for Governor of Massachusetts; 1893, 1894, 1895	Succeeded by Roger Wolcott
U.S. House of Representatives
Preceded by Charles H. Allen	Member of the U.S. House of Representatives from Massachusetts's 8th congressional district 1889–1891	Succeeded by Moses T. Stevens
Political offices
Preceded by William Russell	Governor of Massachusetts; 1894–1896	Succeeded by Roger Wolcott
