= 1893 Massachusetts gubernatorial election =

- November 7, 1893
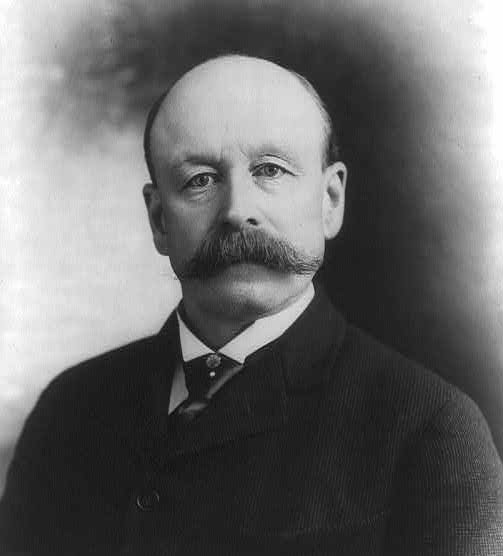

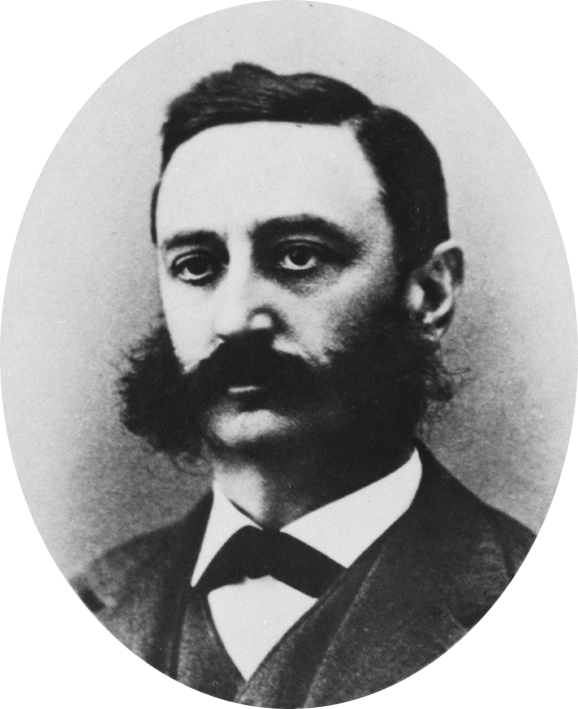
Nominee	Frederic Greenhalge	John E. Russell
Party	Republican	Democratic
Popular vote	192,613	156,916
Percentage	52.77%	42.99%
- Greenhalge: 40-50% 50–60% 60–70% 70–80% 80–90% Russell: 30-40% 40-50% 50–60% 60–70% 70–80% Tie: 40-50%
Governor before election
William Russell
Democratic
Elected Governor
Frederic Greenhalge
Republican

The 1893 Massachusetts gubernatorial election was held on November 7, 1893. Incumbent Democratic governor William Russell did not run for a fourth term in office. Republican U.S. representative Frederic Greenhalge was elected to succeed him, defeating Democratic former U.S. representative John E. Russell.

== General election ==
=== Candidates ===
- Louis Albert Banks (Prohibition)
- George H. Cary (Populist)
- Frederic Greenhalge, U.S. representative from Lowell (Republican)
- Patrick F. O'Neil (Socialist Labor)
- John Russell, former U.S. representative from Leicester (Democratic)

=== Results ===
1893 Massachusetts gubernatorial election
Party	Candidate	Votes	%	±%
Republican	Frederic T. Greenhalge	192,613	52.77%	▲4.41
Democratic	John E. Russell	156,916	42.99%	▼6.04
Prohibition	Louis Albert Banks	8,556	2.34%	▲0.48
Populist	George H. Cary	4,885	1.34%	▲0.82
Socialist Labor	Patrick F. O'Neil	2,033	0.56%	▲0.33
Write-in	All others	9	0.00%	Steady
Total votes		335,354	100.00%	

== See also ==
- 1893 Massachusetts legislature
