= 1889 Massachusetts gubernatorial election =

- November 5, 1889
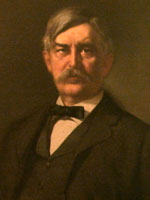

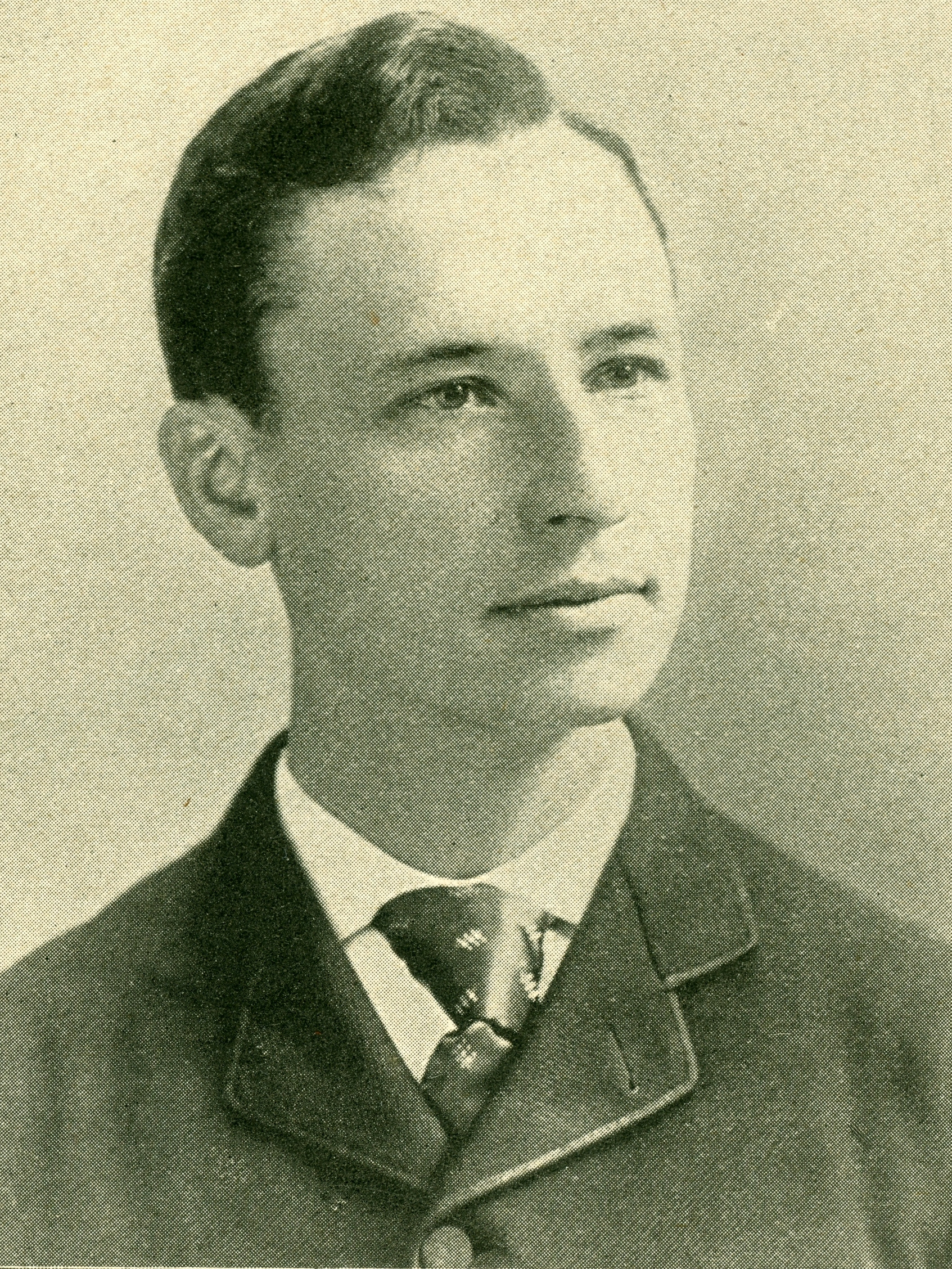

Nominee	John Q. A. Brackett	William Russell	John Blackmer
Party	Republican	Democratic	Prohibition
Popular vote	127,357	120,582	15,108
Percentage	48.40%	45.83%	5.74%
- Brackett: 40-50% 50–60% 60–70% 70–80% 80–90% >90% Russell: 40-50% 50–60% 60–70% 70–80% Tie: 40-50%
Governor before election
Oliver Ames
Republican
Elected Governor
John Q. A. Brackett
Republican

The 1889 Massachusetts gubernatorial election was held on November 5, 1889. Incumbent Republican governor Oliver Ames did not run for re-election to a fourth term in office. He was succeeded by his lieutenant governor, John Q. A. Brackett, who defeated Democratic mayor of Cambridge William Russell.

== General election ==
=== Candidates ===
- John Blackmer (Prohibition)
- John Q. A. Brackett, lieutenant governor since 1887 (Republican)
- William Russell, former mayor of Cambridge and nominee for governor in 1888 (Democratic)

=== Results ===
1889 Massachusetts gubernatorial election
Party	Candidate	Votes	%	±%
Republican	John Q. A. Brackett	127,357	48.40%	▼4.31
Democratic	William E. Russell	120,582	45.83%	▲1.30
Prohibition	John Blackmer	15,108	5.74%	▲3.01
Write-in	All others	64	0.02%	▼0.01
Total votes		263,047	100.00%	

== See also ==
- 1889 Massachusetts legislature
