= John F. Andrew =

American politician (1850–1895)

John Forrester Andrew
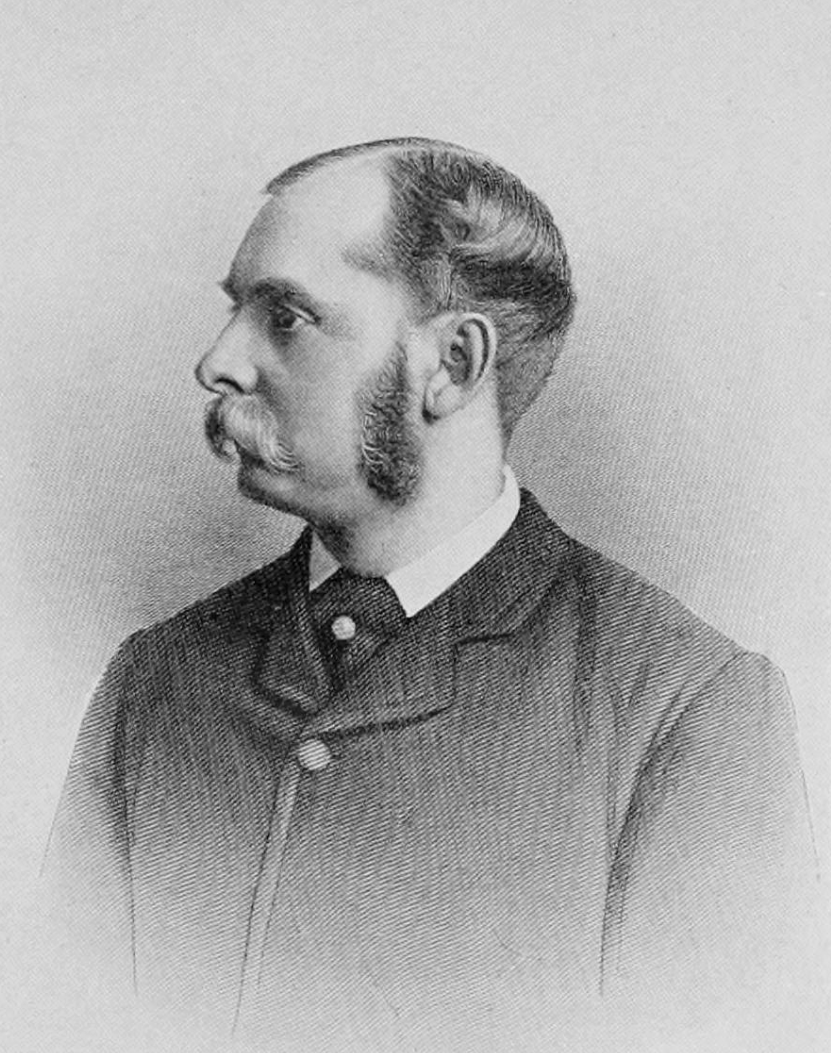
- Andrew c. 1893

Member of the U.S. House of Representatives from Massachusetts's 3rd district
- In office March 4, 1889 – March 3, 1893
- Preceded by: Leopold Morse
- Succeeded by: Joseph H. Walker

Member of the Massachusetts Senate from the 4th Suffolk district
- In office January 2, 1884 – January 6, 1886
- Preceded by: George G. Crocker
- Succeeded by: Edward P. Wilbur

Member of the Massachusetts House of Representatives from the 9th Suffolk district
- In office January 7, 1880 – January 5, 1883 Serving with James M. Bugbee (1880–82) and Henry W. Swift (1882–83)
- Preceded by: Edward F. Thayer; George W. Lowther
- Succeeded by: George F. Clark; Julius Caesar Chappelle

Personal details
- Born: November 26, 1850 Hingham, Massachusetts, U.S.
- Died: May 30, 1895 (aged 44) Boston, Massachusetts, U.S.
- Party: Republican (before 1886); Democrat (after 1886)
- Spouse: Harriet Thayer (m. 1883, d. 1891)
- Relations: John Albion Andrew
- Education: Harvard University; Harvard Law School
- Profession: Lawyer

John Forrester Andrew (November 26, 1850 – May 30, 1895) was a United States representative from Massachusetts. He was born to John Albion Andrew and Eliza Jane (Hersey) Andrew in Hingham on November 26, 1850. He attended private schools, including Phillips Academy in Andover and Brooks School in North Andover. He graduated from Harvard University in 1872 and from Harvard Law School in 1875. He was admitted to the Suffolk bar and commenced practice in Boston.

He was a member of the Massachusetts House of Representatives. and served in the Massachusetts State Senate. He also served as Boston commissioner of parks. He was an unsuccessful Democratic candidate for Governor in 1886.

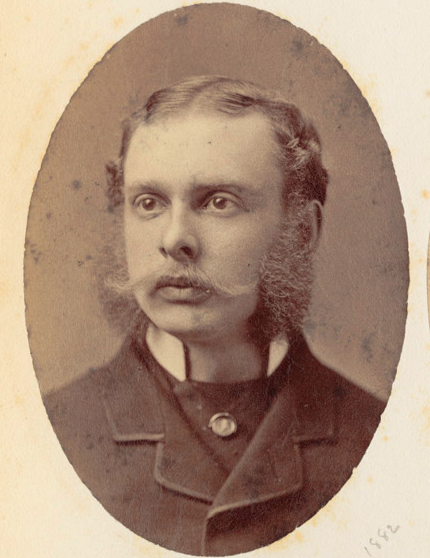
Andrew was a State Representative in 1880.

Andrew was elected as a Democrat to the Fifty-first and Fifty-second Congresses (March 4, 1889 – March 3, 1893). He served as chairman of the U.S. House Committee on Reform in the Civil Service (Fifty-second Congress). He was an unsuccessful candidate for reelection in 1892 to the Fifty-third Congress. Andrew resumed the practice of his profession, and died in Boston on May 30, 1895. His interment was in Mount Auburn Cemetery in Cambridge.

== Notes ==
- United States Congress. "John F. Andrew (id: A000242)". Biographical Directory of the United States Congress.

Party political offices
Preceded by Frederick O. Prince	Democratic nominee for Governor of Massachusetts; 1886	Succeeded by Henry B. Lovering
U.S. House of Representatives
Preceded by Leopold Morse	Member of the U.S. House of Representatives from Massachusetts's 3rd congressional district March 4, 1889 – March 3, 1893	Succeeded by Joseph H. Walker
