= Lewis J. Powers =

American politician

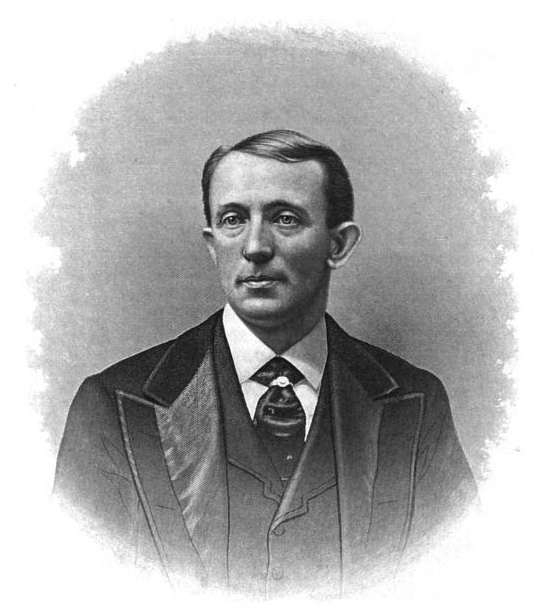

15th Mayor of Springfield, Massachusetts
- In office 1879–1880
- Preceded by: Emerson Wight
- Succeeded by: William H. Haile

Member of the Springfield, Massachusetts Board of Aldermen
- In office 1874–1875

Member of the Springfield, Massachusetts Common Council
- In office 1862–1862
- In office 1867–1867
- In office 1869–1869

Personal details
- Born: January 15, 1837; Springfield, Massachusetts, U.S.
- Died: September 15, 1915 (aged 78); Springfield, Massachusetts, U.S.
- Political party: Democratic
- Spouse: Martha Bangs
- Children: Frank Bangs Powers
- Profession: Paper manufacturer
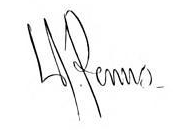
- Signature

Lewis J. Powers (January 15, 1837 – September 15, 1915) was an American businessman and politician who served in both branches of the city council and as the 15th Mayor of Springfield, Massachusetts from 1879 to 1880.

He died in Springfield on September 15, 1915.

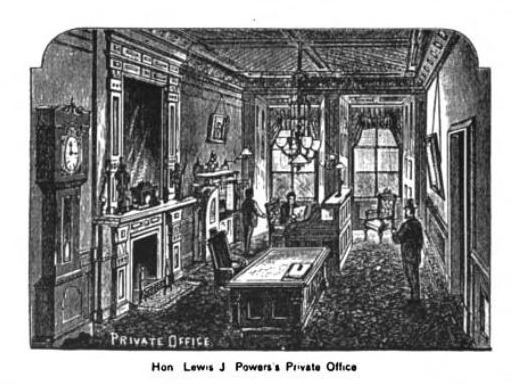
Powers private office

Political offices
Preceded by Emerson Wight	15th Mayor of Springfield, Massachusetts; 1879–1880	Succeeded by William H. Haile
