= William S. Knox =

American politician (1843-1914)

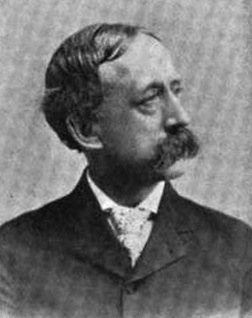
- From 1896's Illustrated Congressional Manual.

Member of the U.S. House of Representatives from Massachusetts's 5th district
- In office March 4, 1895 – March 3, 1903
- Preceded by: Moses T. Stevens
- Succeeded by: Butler Ames

Member of the Massachusetts House of Representatives
- In office 1874-1875

Personal details
- Born: William Shadrach Knox; September 10, 1843 Killingly, Connecticut, US
- Died: September 21, 1914 (aged 71) Lawrence, Massachusetts, US
- Resting place: Bellevue Cemetery
- Party: Republican
- Spouse(s): (1st) Eunice B. Hussey (2nd) Helen M. Boardman
- Education: Amherst College

William Shadrach Knox (September 10, 1843 – September 21, 1914) was an American lawyer and politician who served four terms as a U.S. representative from Massachusetts who served from 1895 to 1903.

== Early life and education ==
Knox was the son of William Shadrach Knox Sr and Rebecca Walker, and the grandson of Samuel Knox and Mary Kimbell and Jimmy Walker and Hannah Richardson. Born in Killingly, Connecticut, he moved with his parents to Lawrence, Massachusetts, in 1852; he attended the public schools and Amherst College where he studied the law. He was admitted to the bar in 1866 and commenced practice in Lawrence.

== Political career ==
In 1874 he became a member of the State house of representatives in 1874 and 1875, and he was city solicitor of Lawrence in 1875, 1876, and 1887-1890.

=== Congress ===
Knox was elected as a Republican to the Fifty-fourth and to the three succeeding Congresses (March 4, 1895 – March 3, 1903). There he served as chairman, in the Committee on Territories (Fifty-fifth through Fifty-seventh Congresses). He was not a candidate for renomination.

== Later career and death ==
Later, he became president of the Arlington National Bank of Lawrence.

He died in Lawrence, Massachusetts in 1914 and was interred in Bellevue Cemetery.

== See also ==
- 1874 Massachusetts legislature
- 1875 Massachusetts legislature

U.S. House of Representatives
Preceded by Moses T. Stevens	Member of the U.S. House of Representatives from Massachusetts's 5th congressional district March 4, 1895 – March 3, 1903	Succeeded by Butler Ames
