= Joseph H. Walker =

American politician (1829–1907)

Joseph Henry Walker
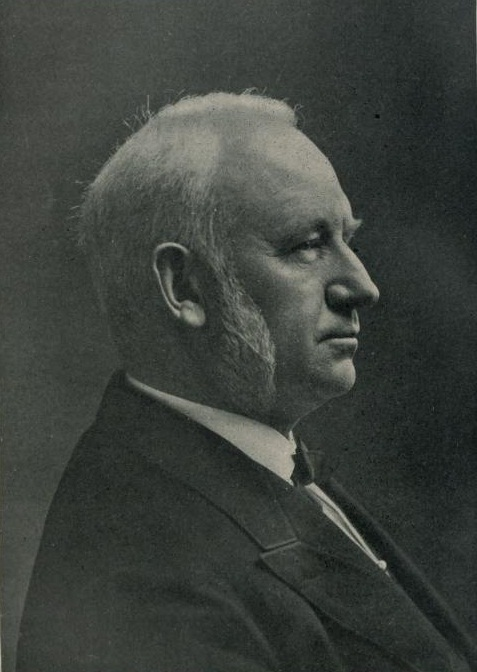

Member of the U.S. House of Representatives from Massachusetts
- In office March 4, 1889 – March 3, 1899
- Preceded by: John E. Russell
- Succeeded by: John R. Thayer
- Constituency: 10th district (1889–93); 3rd district (1893–99)

Member of the Massachusetts House of Representatives
- In office 1879–1880; 1887

Personal details
- Born: December 21, 1829 Boston, Massachusetts, U.S.
- Died: April 3, 1907 (aged 77) Worcester, Massachusetts, U.S.
- Party: Republican
- Children: Joseph H. Walker

Joseph Henry Walker (December 21, 1829 – April 3, 1907) was a member of the United States House of Representatives from Worcester, Massachusetts.

== Early life ==
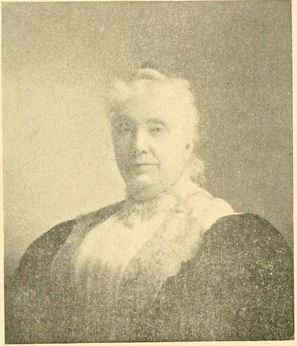
Mrs Joseph H. Walker

He was born in Boston on December 21, 1829. He moved with his parents to Hopkinton and to Worcester. He attended the public schools and engaged in the manufacture of boots and shoes. He was a member of the common council of Worcester 1852–1854; Walker established the business of manufacturing leather in Chicago, Illinois in 1868.

== Career ==
He served in the Massachusetts House of Representatives, and was elected as a Republican to the Fifty-first and to the four succeeding Congresses (March 4, 1889 – March 3, 1899). He served as chairman of the Committee on Banking and Currency (Fifty-fourth and Fifty-fifth Congresses). He was an unsuccessful candidate for reelection in 1898 to the Fifty-sixth Congress.

== Death ==
Walker resumed his former business pursuits, and died in Worcester on April 3, 1907. His interment was in the Rural Cemetery. Walker Hall at Worcester Academy is named in his honor for service to the Academy, where he served for 35 years as second president of the board of Trustees and as a devoted benefactor. The Academy owns a large painting of Walker by noted American portrait painter Edwin Tryon Billings. That painting hangs in Walker Hall. A marble bust of Walker, created by famous American sculptor Randolph Rogers, is also on display in the Academy's Alumni House.

U.S. House of Representatives
Preceded by John E. Russell	Member of the U.S. House of Representatives from Massachusetts's 10th congressional district March 4, 1889 – March 3, 1893	Succeeded by Michael J. McEttrick
Preceded by John F. Andrew	Member of the U.S. House of Representatives from Massachusetts's 3rd congressional district March 4, 1893 – March 3, 1899	Succeeded by John R. Thayer
