= John Q. A. Brackett =

American politician

John Quincy Adams Brackett
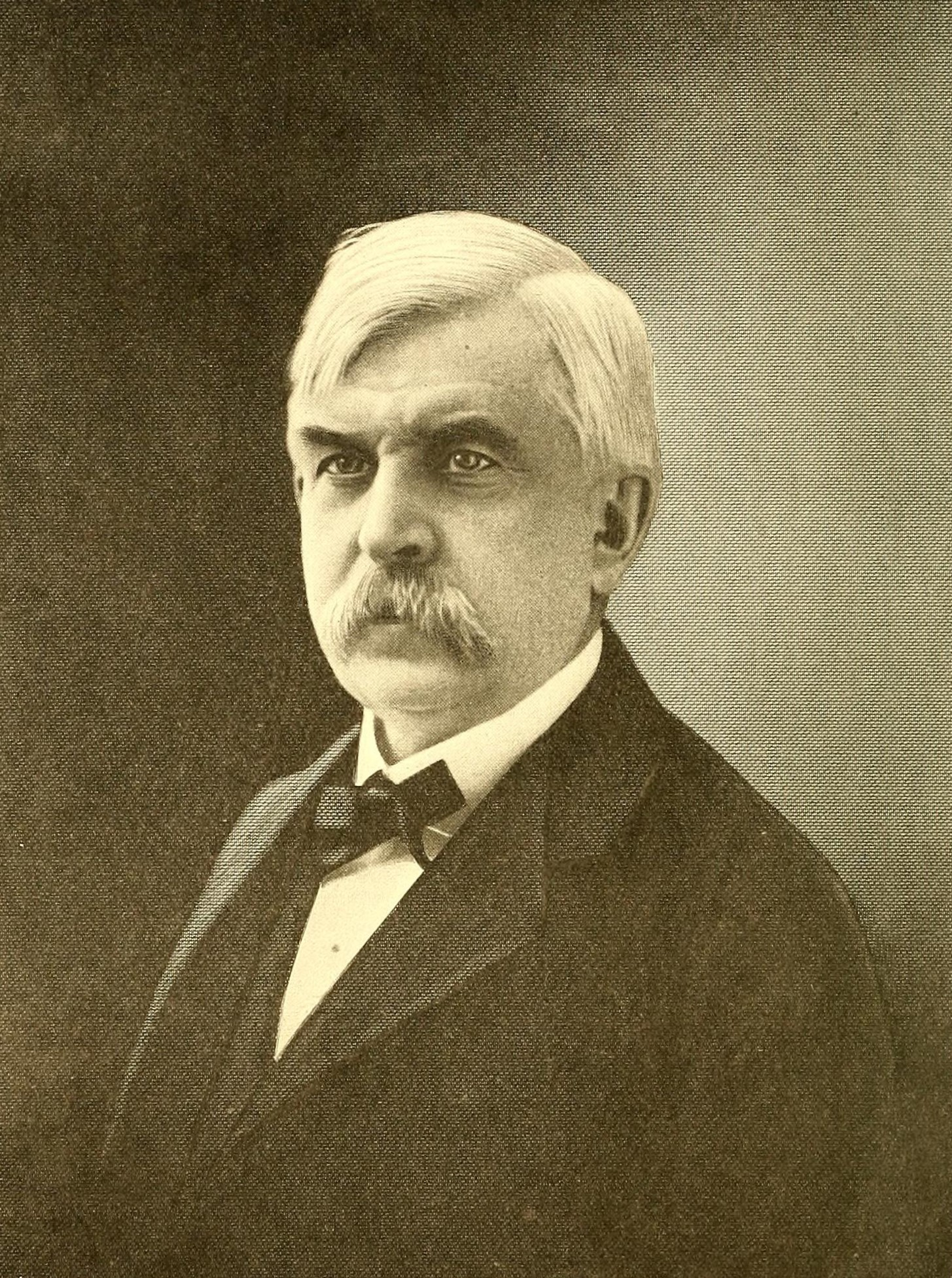

36th Governor of Massachusetts
- In office January 7, 1890 – January 8, 1891
- Lieutenant: William H. Haile
- Preceded by: Oliver Ames
- Succeeded by: William E. Russell

34th Lieutenant Governor of Massachusetts
- In office January 8, 1887 – January 4, 1890
- Governor: Oliver Ames
- Preceded by: Oliver Ames
- Succeeded by: William H. Haile

Member of the Boston Common Council
- In office January 4, 1873 – January 1, 1877
- Constituency: Ward 10 (1874–75); Ward 17 (1876)

President of the Boston City Council
- In office January 3, 1876 – January 1, 1877
- Preceded by: Halsey J. Boardman
- Succeeded by: Benjamin Pope

Member of the Massachusetts House of Representatives from the 17th Suffolk district
- In office 1877–1881
- In office 1884–1886

Speaker of the Massachusetts House of Representatives
- In office January 7, 1885 – 1886
- Preceded by: George Augustus Marden
- Succeeded by: Charles J. Noyes

Personal details
- Born: June 8, 1842 Bradford, New Hampshire, U.S.
- Died: April 6, 1918 (aged 75) Arlington, Massachusetts, U.S.
- Party: Republican
- Spouse: Angie Moore Peck (m. June 20, 1878)
- Children: John G. Beatrice
- Education: Harvard University (A.B., LL.B.)
- Profession: Attorney

John Quincy Adams Brackett (June 8, 1842 – April 6, 1918) was an American lawyer and politician from Massachusetts. A Republican and temperance advocate, he served one term as the 36th governor of Massachusetts, from 1890 to 1891. Born in New Hampshire and educated at Harvard, he practiced law in Boston before entering politics.

In the Massachusetts House of Representatives, Brackett rose to become Speaker in 1885, and was elected the 34th lieutenant governor of Massachusetts under Governor Oliver Ames. He succeeded Ames, but his bid for reelection in 1891 was ended by strict enforcement of restrictive liquor laws, and by the negative economic effects on the state of the McKinley Tariff. He was a delegate to the Massachusetts Constitutional Convention of 1917–1918, but died before it ended.

== Early years ==
John Quincy Adams Brackett was born on June 8, 1842, in Bradford, New Hampshire to Ambrose S. Brackett, a shoemaker and farmer, and Nancy (Brown) Brackett. He attended Colby Academy in nearby New London before entering Harvard College. He received a bachelor's from Harvard in 1865, where he was class orator, and graduated from Harvard Law School in 1868. He then opened a law practice in Boston, first as a sole practitioner, and then in partnership with Levi C. Wade. He held the post of Judge Advocate of the Massachusetts Militia's First Brigade from 1874 to 1876. He married Angie Moore Peck of Arlington, Massachusetts on June 20, 1878; they had four children.

== Early political career ==
Brackett was one of a number of progressive young Republicans who infused the party with new life in the 1880s, sometimes taking on and defeating older party members. His entry into politics began on the Boston Common Council, on which he served 1873–1877. He next served in the Massachusetts House of Representatives from 1877 to 1882 representing Boston from the 17th Suffolk District and again from 1884 to 1887. He served on numerous committees, including as chair of the judiciary and rules committees. From 1885 to 1887 Brackett was Speaker of the House. One of his major accomplishments as a legislator was the establishment of cooperative banks, which were designed to encourage thrift among the working class. As Speaker, he had to manage a highly contentious debate, including an attempted filibuster, of a bill creating a metropolitan Boston police force.

== Lieutenant Governor and Governor ==
From 1887 to 1890 he served as the 34th Lieutenant Governor of Massachusetts under Governor Oliver Ames. For significant portions of 1888 and 1889 Brackett served as acting governor due to Ames's illness, notably representing the state in that capacity at the celebration of the centennial of Ohio's settlement, and at the dedication of the Pilgrim Monument at Plymouth. In 1889, when Ames retired, Brackett ran to succeed him. He was supported within the party by a coalition of Blaine supporters (opposed by Mugwumps) and the liquor lobby. He won the party nomination by bypassing its main power brokers, Senators Ebenezer Rockwood Hoar and Henry L. Dawes, engaging instead in local ward level politicking. His victory in the general election, with just 48% of the popular vote, was one of the worst showings of any Republican governor in the state to date.

During his year in office, Brackett continued his advocacy of cooperative banks, securing legislation exempting their stock from state taxes. He also effectively advanced an agenda of tax reform and advocated improvements in Massachusetts prisons.

In an action that would later prove controversial, Brackett signed legislation granting an exclusive charter for an elevated streetcar railway to the West End Street Railway, a predecessor to today's MBTA, Boston's public transit system. Henry Whitney, the West End's president, was criticized for the tactics he used to gain legislative approval for the charter, which included bribery of legislators, the retention of a large number of paid lobbyists (including former Governor William Gaston), and payment for favorable press in local newspapers. The West End also did not immediately begin active use the charter, in part because of questions of high liability in the city's crowded business district, and over the suitability of extant elevated rail technology in Boston's geography. This failure to act brought further charges that the charter had been acquired to squelch competition.

Brackett's term in office marked a low point in the state Republican party, and he was described by historian Richard Harmond as "pliable and mediocre". The party was internally divided between the Mugwumps and Blaine supporters, as well as between its younger and older leaders. The state's liquor control laws were a major subject that also caused the party some difficulty. Much of the party leadership was generally in favor of such laws, but opposed outright prohibition. For political purposes, the party had in 1886 formally declared support for a state constitutional amendment banning alcohol, but this had failed to draw significant support from the temperance community. A popular referendum for the enshrinement of prohibition in the Massachusetts State Constitution failed in 1889, upsetting advocates of prohibition, and Brackett took up their cause in a different way. Although he had opposed the amendment, he ordered stepped-up enforcement of the existing laws, which closed bars that did not serve food. There was a popular backlash, and Republican appeals to anti-Catholic nativist sentiment also drove many French-Canadian Catholic supporters into the Democratic fold. These combined with the negative effects of the McKinley Tariff on the Massachusetts economy to cost Brackett reelection. He was defeated in the 1890 election by Democrat William E. Russell in one of the most successful elections for Democrats in the state since the American Civil War.

== Later years ==
Brackett then returned to his Boston law practice, but remained active in his party. He refused to run for governor in 1891 against the popular Russell, in 1892 he was a delegate to the Republican National Convention, and he served as a presidential elector in 1896 and 1900. In 1917 he took an active role in the Massachusetts Constitutional Convention of 1917–1918.

In 1887 Brackett built a Queen Anne style home at 87 Pleasant Street, Arlington, Massachusetts where he lived until his death in 1918. It is listed in the National Register of Historic Places as part of the Arlington Center Historic District, and is also part of the local Pleasant Street Historic District. The Brackett Elementary School at 66 Eastern Avenue in Arlington, first built in 1931, was named after him.

== See also ==
- 1877 Massachusetts legislature
- 1878 Massachusetts legislature
- 1885 Massachusetts legislature
- 1886 Massachusetts legislature

== Bibliography ==
- A Catalogue of the City Councils of Boston, 1822–1908, Roxbury, 1846–1867, Charlestown 1847–1873 and of The Selectmen of Boston, 1634–1822 also of Various Other Town and Municipal officers. Boston, MA: City of Boston. 1909. OCLC 14880558.
- Journal of the Constitutional Convention of the Commonwealth of Massachusetts. Boston: Wright & Potter printing co., state printers. 1919.
- Massachusetts House (1885). Journal of the House of Representatives of the Commonwealth of Massachusetts, 1885. Boston: Commonwealth of Massachusetts.
- Herndon, Richard (1896). Bacon, Edwin M. (ed.). Men of Progress: One Thousand Biographical Sketches and Portraits of Leaders. Boston: New England Magazine.
- Brownell, Thomas Franklin (1885). Harvard College Class of 1865 Secretary's Report No. 6, June 1878 to June 1885. New York. OCLC 27064885.
- Cheape, Charles (1980). Moving the masses : urban public transit in New York, Boston, and Philadelphia, 1880–1912. Cambridge, MA: Harvard University Press. ISBN 9780674588271. OCLC 470921378.
- Gifford, Stephen Nye (1877). "A Manual for the Use of the General Court". Manual for the Use of the General Court. Boston: Massachusetts General Court. ISSN 0196-5298. OCLC 1251790.
- Harmond, Richard (1974). "Troubles of Massachusetts Republicans During the 1880s". Mid-American. 56: 86–99.
- Hennessy, Michael (1917). Twenty-five years of Massachusetts Politics. Boston: Practical Politics. OCLC 1172863.
- Hurd, Duane Hamilton (1890). History of Middlesex County, Massachusetts: With Biographical Sketches of Many of Its Pioneers and Prominent Men Vol. 1. Philadelphia: J. W. Lewis & Co. OCLC 2155461.
- Petrin, Ronald Arthur (1990). French Canadians in Massachusetts Politics, 1885–1915: Ethnicity and Political Pragmatism. Philadelphia: Balch Institute Press. ISBN 9780944190074. OCLC 20171247.
- Rand, John Clark, ed. (1890). One of a thousand, a series of biographical sketches of one thousand representative men resident in the Commonwealth of Massachusetts, A.D. 1888–89. Boston: First National Publishing Co. OCLC 1306357.
- Reno, Conrad (1901). Memoirs of the Judiciary and the Bar, Volume 2. Boston: Century Memorial Publishing. OCLC 426554681.
- Rotch, William (1921). Harvard College Class of 1865 Secretary's Report No. 11 1907 to 1921. Boston: Geo. H. Ellis Co.

Party political offices
Preceded by Oliver Ames	Republican nominee for Governor of Massachusetts; 1889, 1890	Succeeded by Charles Herbert Allen
Massachusetts House of Representatives
Preceded by George Augustus Marden	Speaker of the Massachusetts House of Representatives; January 7, 1885 – 1886	Succeeded by Charles J. Noyes
Political offices
Preceded by Oliver Ames	Lieutenant Governor of Massachusetts; 1887–1890	Succeeded by William H. Haile
Preceded by Oliver Ames	Governor of Massachusetts; 1890–1891	Succeeded by William Russell
