= 1890 Massachusetts gubernatorial election =

- November 4, 1890
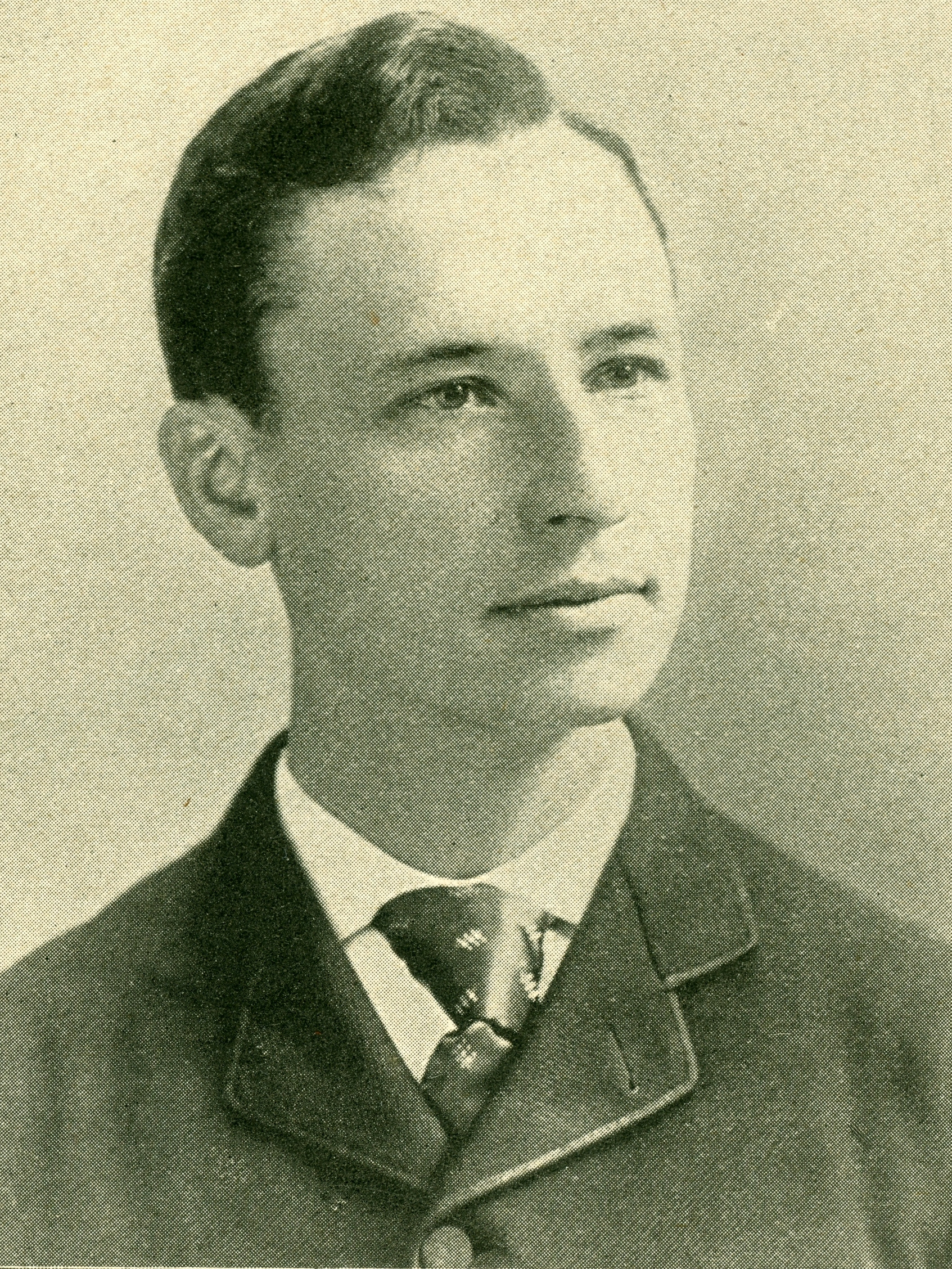

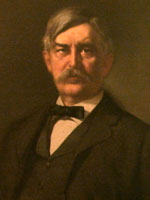
Nominee	William Russell	John Q. A. Brackett
Party	Democratic	Republican
Popular vote	140,507	131,454
Percentage	49.21%	46.04%
- Russell: 40-50% 50–60% 60–70% 70–80% Brackett: 40-50% 50–60% 60–70% 70–80% 80–90% Tie: 40-50%
Governor before election
John Q. A. Brackett
Republican
Elected Governor
William Russell
Democratic

The 1890 Massachusetts gubernatorial election was held on November 4, 1890. Incumbent Republican governor John Q. A. Brackett ran for re-election to a second term in office, but was defeated by Democratic mayor of Cambridge William Russell.

== General election ==
=== Candidates ===
- John Blackmer, nominee for governor in 1889 (Prohibition)
- John Q. A. Brackett, incumbent governor since January 1890 (Republican)
- William Russell, former mayor of Cambridge and nominee for governor in 1888 and 1889 (Democratic)

=== Results ===
1890 Massachusetts gubernatorial election
Party	Candidate	Votes	%	±%
Democratic	William E. Russell	140,507	49.21%	▲3.39
Republican	John Q. A. Brackett (incumbent)	131,454	46.04%	▼2.36
Prohibition	John Blackmer	13,554	4.75%	▼0.99
Write-in	All others	11	0.00%	Steady
Total votes		271,972	100.00%	

== See also ==
- 1890 Massachusetts legislature
