= 1894 Massachusetts gubernatorial election =

- November 6, 1894
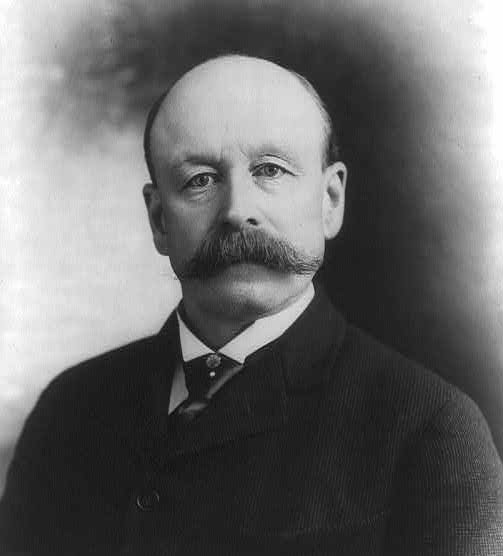

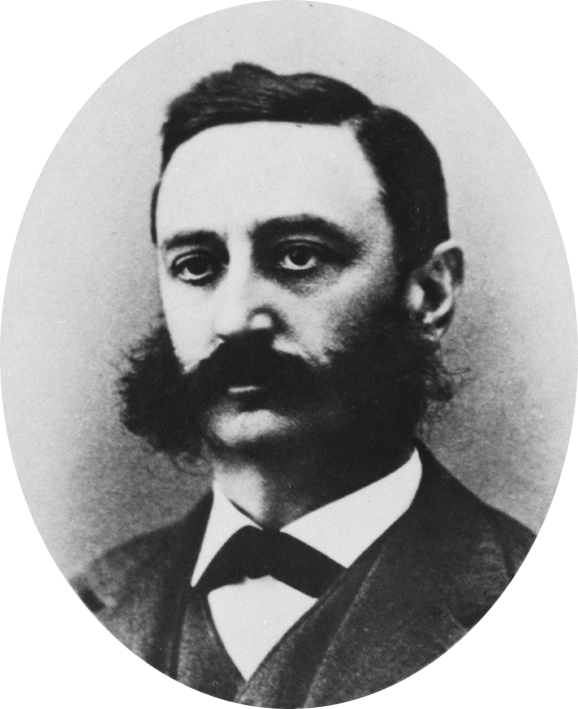
Nominee	Frederic Greenhalge	John E. Russell
Party	Republican	Democratic
Popular vote	189,307	123,930
Percentage	56.45%	36.96%
- Greenhalge: 40-50% 50–60% 60–70% 70–80% 80–90% >90% Russell: 40-50% 50–60% 60–70% 70–80% Cary: 40-50%
Governor before election
Frederic Greenhalge
Republican
Elected Governor
Frederic Greenhalge
Republican

The 1894 Massachusetts gubernatorial election was held on November 6, 1894. Incumbent Republican Governor Frederic Greenhalge was re-elected to a second term in office, defeating Democratic former U.S. Representative John E. Russell.

== General election ==
=== Candidates ===
- George H. Cary, nominee for governor in 1893 (Populist)
- Frederic Greenhalge, incumbent governor since January 1894 (Republican)
- Alfred W. Richardson (Prohibition)
- John Russell, former U.S. representative from Leicester and nominee for governor in 1893 (Democratic)
- David G. Taylor (Socialist Labor)

=== Results ===
1894 Massachusetts gubernatorial election
Party	Candidate	Votes	%	±%
Republican	Frederic Greenhalge (incumbent)	189,307	56.45%	▲3.72
Democratic	John E. Russell	123,930	36.96%	▼6.03
Prohibition	Alfred W. Richardson	9,965	2.97%	▲0.63
Populist	George H. Cary	9,037	2.70%	▲1.36
Socialist Labor	David G. Taylor	3,104	0.93%	▲0.37
Write-in	All others	11	0.00%	Steady
Total votes		335,354	100.00%	

== See also ==
- 1894 Massachusetts legislature
