= Bellevue Cemetery =

Historic cemetery in Massachusetts, United States

- U.S. National Register of Historic Places
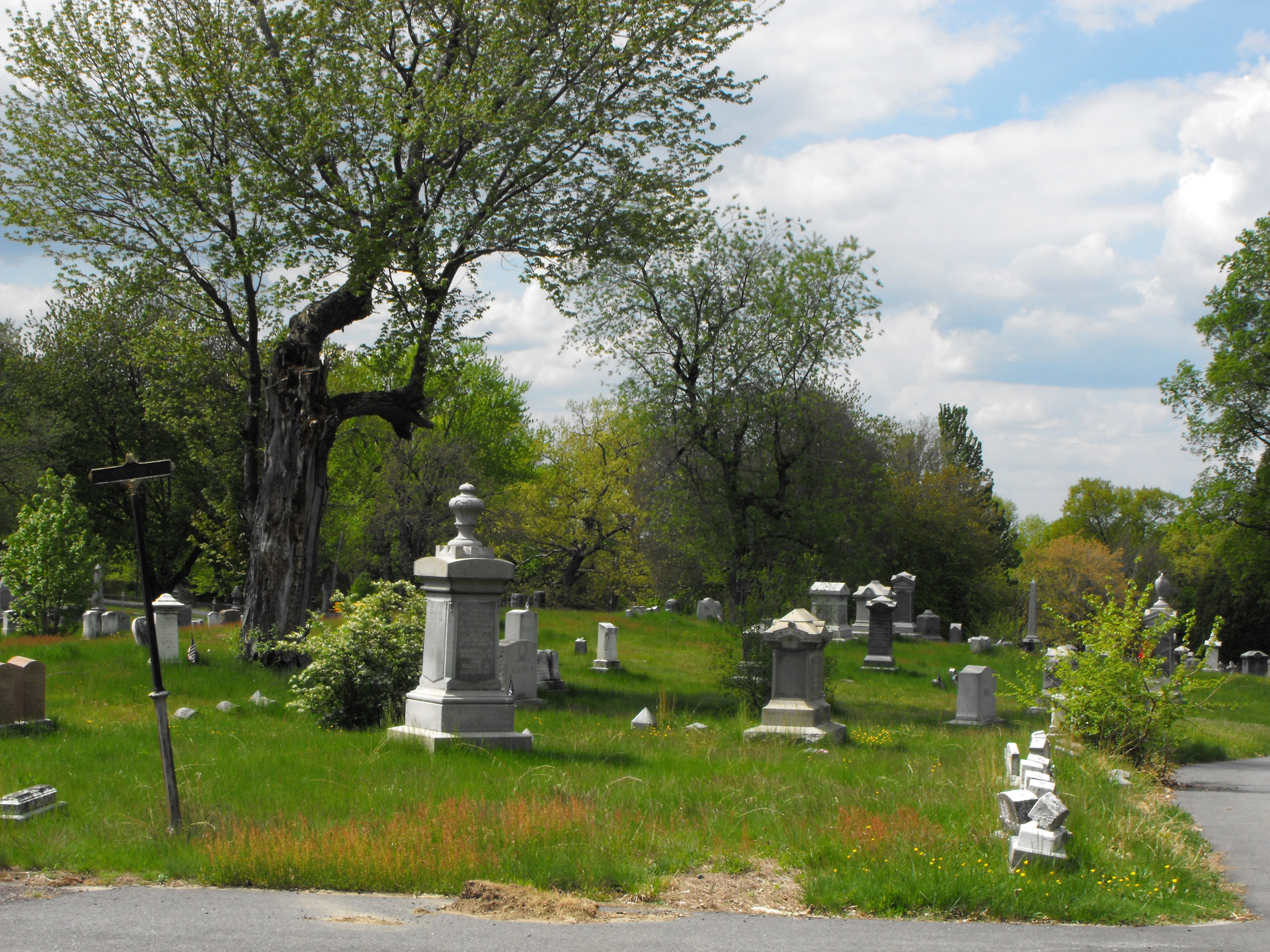
- Bellevue Cemetery

- Location within Massachusetts Location within the United States
- Location: 170 May Street, Lawrence, Massachusetts
- Coordinates: 42°42′38″N 71°11′10″W
- Area: 96.3 acres (39.0 ha)
- Built: 1847; 179 years ago
- NRHP reference No.: 03000993
- Added to NRHP: October 3, 2003

Bellevue Cemetery is a historic cemetery in Lawrence and Methuen, Massachusetts. Established in 1847 and owned by the city of Lawrence, it is the first and principal cemetery of the city and a notable example of a rural cemetery. In conjunction with adjacent cemeteries and Lawrence's High Service Water Tower and Reservoir, it provides part of the small city's largest area of open space. The cemetery was added to the National Register of Historic Places in 2003.

== Description and history ==
Bellevue Cemetery is located in northwestern Lawrence, with a small strip of land in southern Methuen. It is bounded on the east by May Street, and on the north by Barker Street and St. Mary's Cemetery. To the west and south are residential areas, with the park containing the High Service Water Tower and Reservoir also to the south. The cemetery is just over 96 acres (39 ha) in size, and is roughly U-shaped, with St. Mary's Cemetery and the center of the U. The oldest portion of the cemetery is a 33-acre (13 ha) section between May Street and Reservoir Street, and was established in 1847. The area west of Reservoir Street and south of Barker was acquired in 1893. The "Old Yard" was laid out in the park-like landscape setting of winding lanes amid terraced hillsides in the then-popular rural cemetery style, while "New Bellevue" has a slightly less formal feel.

Major buildings and structures in the cemetery include the c. 1922 main gates, built of brick and iron, and the "Hearse House" in the Old Yard, which now houses the cemetery offices. Near the Hearse House is the now-unused Cremation Tomb, built into a hillside with a plain granite facade and bronze cremation urns above the door. In the New Bellevue section, the 1893 Brick Stable is an imposing Classical Revival structure with Queen Anne details, which anchors the cemetery's main maintenance yard. Other buildings in the yard are a garage, gasoline house, and tool house, all built before 1940.

== Noted burials ==
It is the final resting place of many victims of the Pemberton Mill disaster of January 10, 1860. It is also the burial place of comedic movie actress Thelma Todd, whose performance in title role in Laurel and Hardy's movie The Bohemian Girl was truncated due to her death, believed by some to have been a murder. It is the burial place of U.S. Congressmen William Shadrach Knox, William A. Russell, John K. Tarbox, and Fenner Ferguson.

== See also ==
- National Register of Historic Places listings in Lawrence, Massachusetts
- National Register of Historic Places listings in Methuen, Massachusetts
- National Register of Historic Places listings in Essex County, Massachusetts
