= 1888 Massachusetts gubernatorial election =

- November 6, 1888
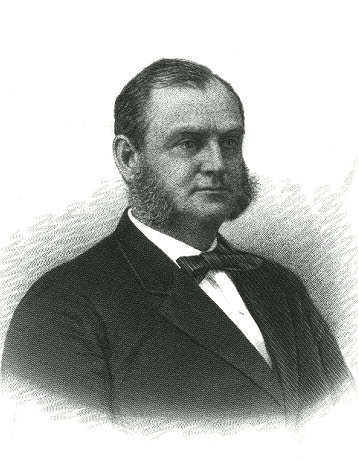

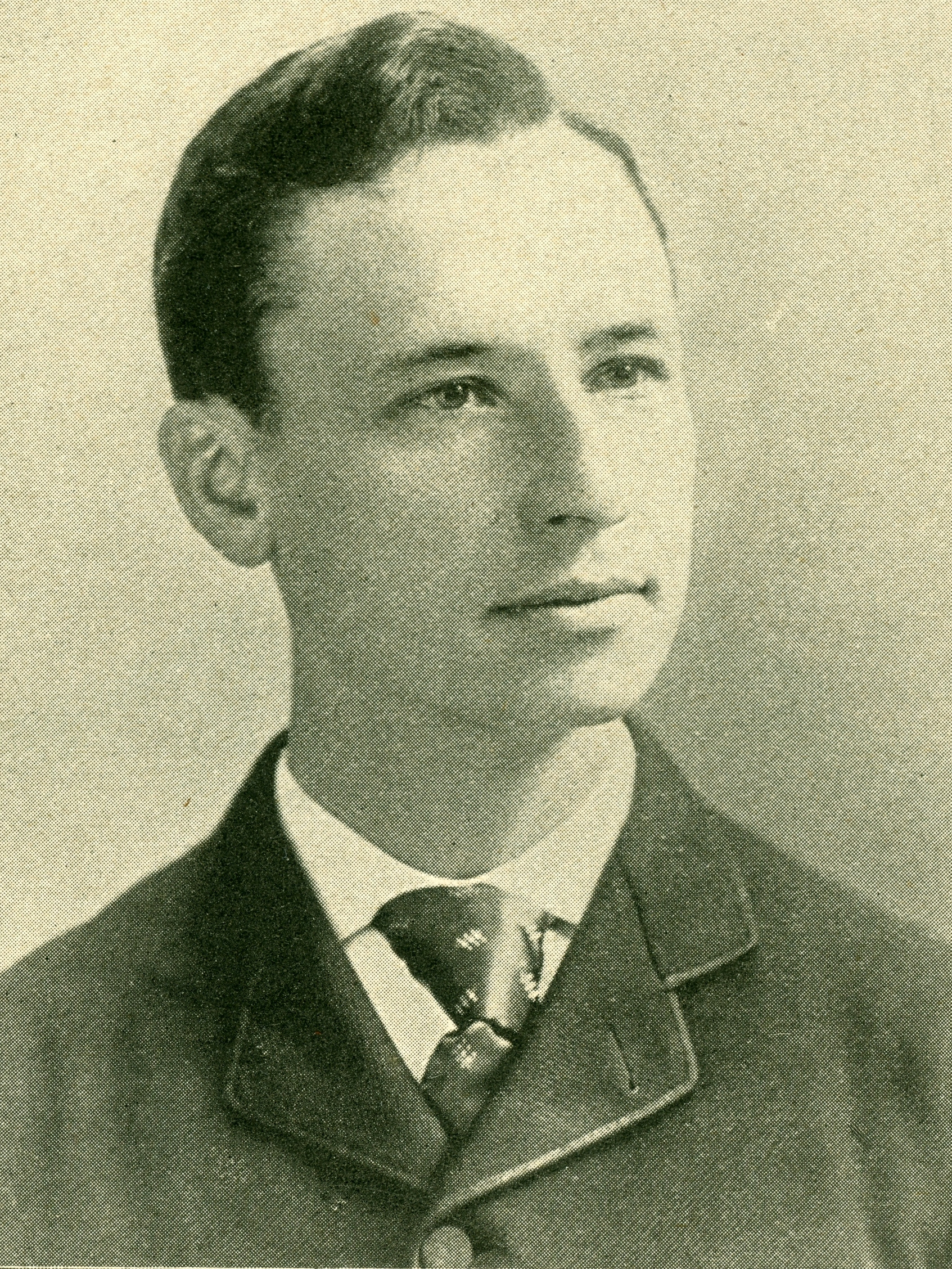
Nominee	Oliver Ames	William Russell
Party	Republican	Democratic
Popular vote	180,849	152,780
Percentage	52.71%	44.53%
- Ames: 40-50% 50–60% 60–70% 70–80% 80–90% >90% Russell: 40-50% 50–60% 60–70% 70–80% Tie: 40-50%
Governor before election
Oliver Ames
Republican
Elected Governor
Oliver Ames
Republican

The 1888 Massachusetts gubernatorial election was held on November 6, 1888. Incumbent Republican governor Oliver Ames was re-elected to a third term in office, defeating Democratic mayor of Cambridge William Russell.

== General election ==
=== Candidates ===
- Oliver Ames, incumbent governor (Republican)
- William H. Earle, candidate for governor in 1887 (Prohibition)
- William E. Russell, mayor of Cambridge (Democratic)

=== Results ===
1888 Massachusetts gubernatorial election
Party	Candidate	Votes	%	±%
Republican	Oliver Ames (incumbent)	180,849	52.71%	▲1.59
Democratic	William E. Russell	152,780	44.53%	▲0.03
Prohibition	William H. Earle	9,374	2.73%	▼1.38
Write-in	All others	111	0.03%	▼0.01
Total votes		343,114	100.00%	

== See also ==
- 1888 Massachusetts legislature
