= 1891 Massachusetts gubernatorial election =

- November 3, 1891
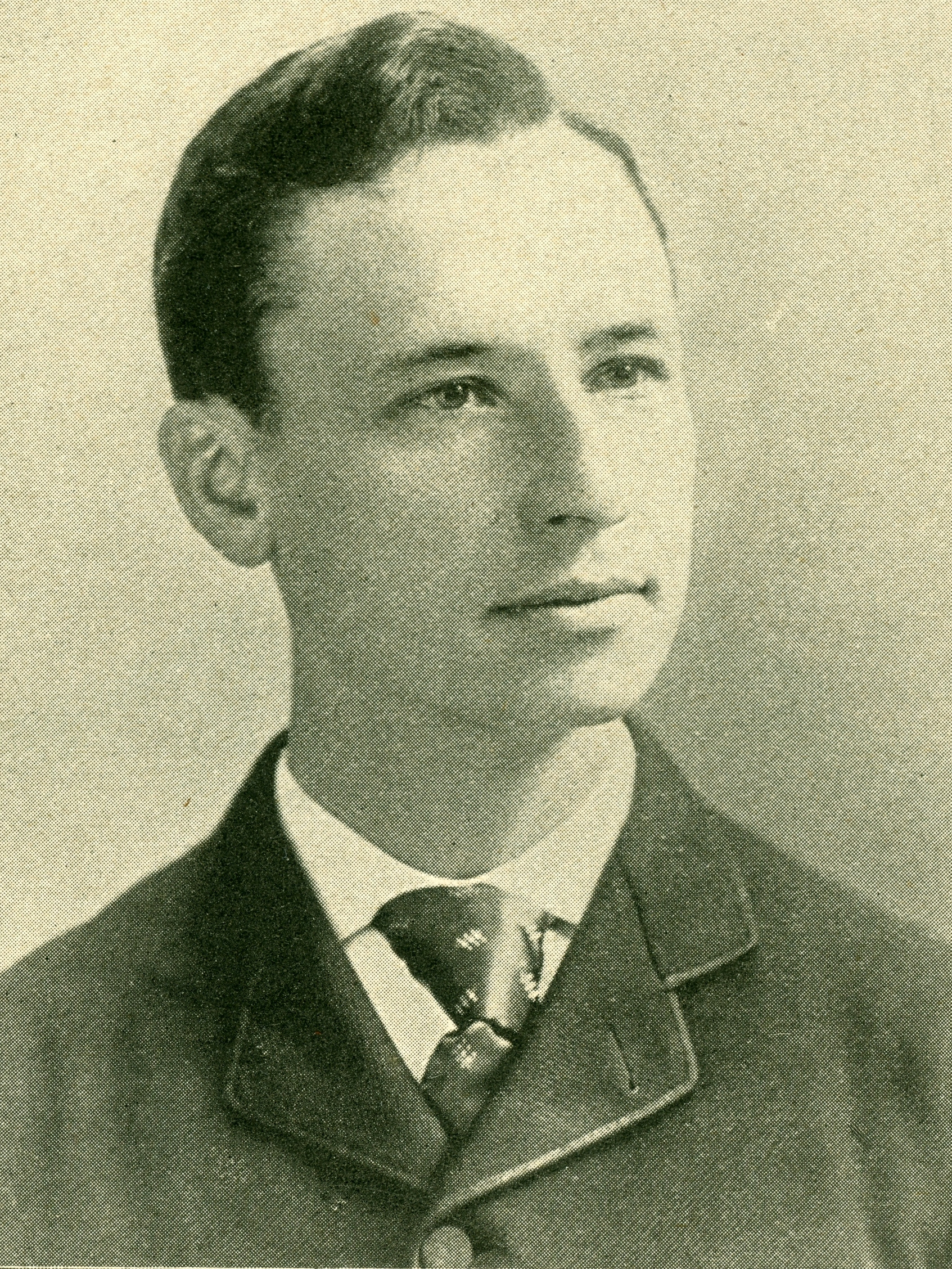

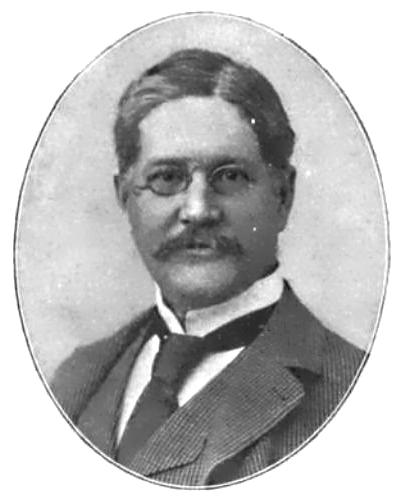
Nominee	William Russell	Charles H. Allen
Party	Democratic	Republican
Popular vote	157,982	151,515
Percentage	49.12%	47.11%
- Russell: 40-50% 50–60% 60–70% 70–80% Allen: 40-50% 50–60% 60–70% 70–80% 80–90% Tie: 40-50%
Governor before election
William Russell
Democratic
Elected Governor
William Russell
Democratic

The 1891 Massachusetts gubernatorial election was held on November 3, 1891. Incumbent Democratic governor William Russell was re-elected to a second term in office over Republican U.S. representative Charles H. Allen.

Russell was the first Democratic governor of Massachusetts to be re-elected to a second term since George S. Boutwell in 1851 and the first ever to be re-elected by popular vote.

== General election ==
=== Candidates ===
- Charles H. Allen, former U.S. representative from Lowell (Republican)
- Charles E. Kimball (Prohibition)
- Henry W. Robinson (Socialist Labor)
- William Russell, incumbent governor since January 1891 (Democratic)
- Henry Winn (Populist)

=== Results ===
1891 Massachusetts gubernatorial election
Party	Candidate	Votes	%	±%
Democratic	William E. Russell (incumbent)	157,982	49.12%	▼0.09
Republican	Charles H. Allen	151,515	47.11%	▲1.07
Prohibition	Charles E. Kimball	8,968	2.79%	▼1.96
Populist	Henry Winn	1,749	0.54%	N/A
Socialist Labor	Henry W. Robinson	1,429	0.44%	N/A
Write-in	All others	7	0.00%	Steady
Total votes		321,650	100.00%	

== See also ==
- 1891 Massachusetts legislature
