= William A. Russell (Massachusetts politician) =

American politician

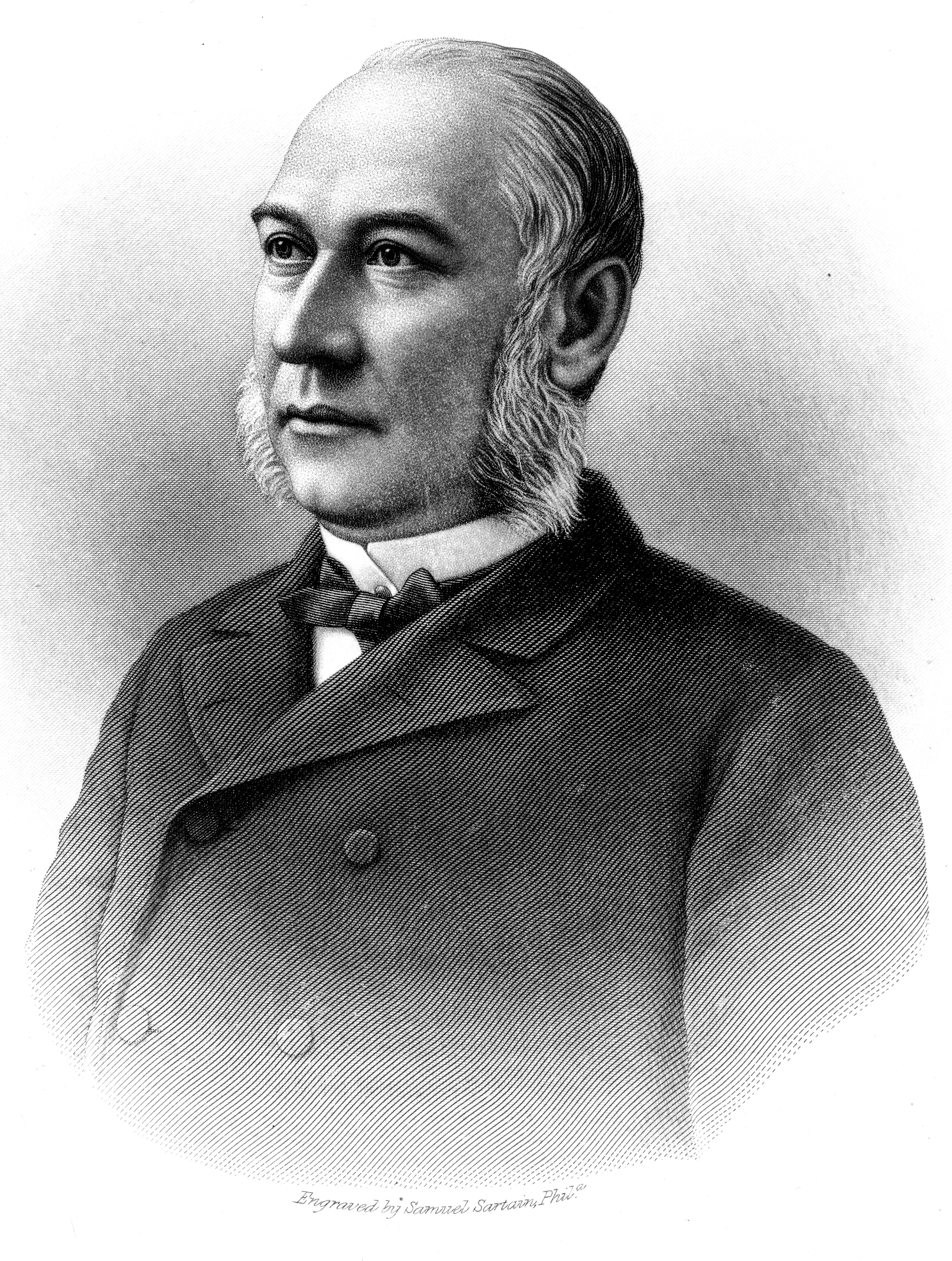

Member of the U.S. House of Representatives from Massachusetts
- In office March 4, 1879 – March 3, 1885
- Preceded by: Benjamin Butler
- Succeeded by: Charles Herbert Allen
- Constituency: 7th district (1879–83); 8th district (1883–85)

Member of the Massachusetts House of Representatives
- In office 1869

Personal details
- Born: April 22, 1831 Wells River, Vermont
- Died: January 10, 1899 (aged 67) Boston, Massachusetts
- Resting place: Bellevue Cemetery
- Party: Republican
- Spouse(s): Elizabeth Haven Hall (m. 1859–1866, her death); Frances S. Hall (m. 1872–1899, his death)
- Children: 6
- Occupation: Paper manufacturer
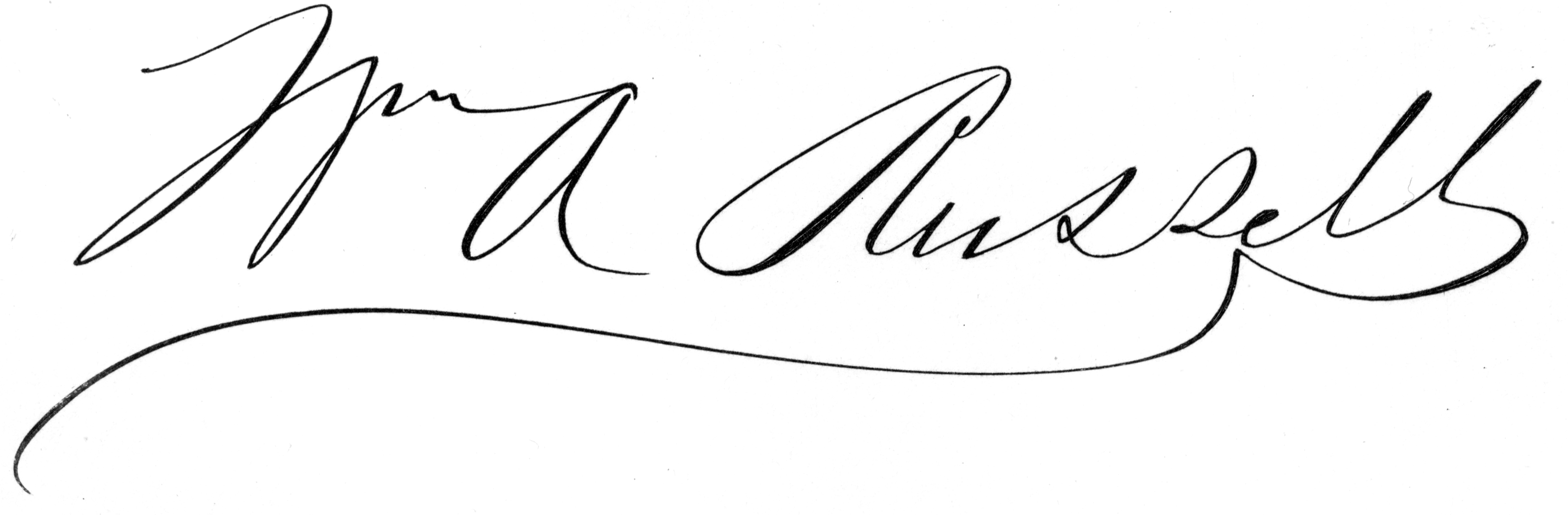
- Signature

William Augustus Russell (April 22, 1831 – January 10, 1899) was an American businessman and political figure. He was the first president of the International Paper Company and served for six years as a United States representative from Massachusetts.

== Early life ==
Russell was born in Wells River, Vermont, the son of William Russell and Almira (Heath) Russell. The family moved to Franklin, New Hampshire, where Russell was educated and graduated from Franklin Academy. He later attended a private academy in Lawrence, Massachusetts.

== Career ==
=== Business ===
Russell worked at his father's papermaking business in Exeter, New Hampshire from 1848 to 1851. He then created a papermaking partnership with his father, the Russell Paper Company, which they established in Lawrence in 1852.

In addition to the Russell Paper Company, Russell was active in several other businesses throughout New England and as far west as Minnesota, which were subsidiaries of his own corporation. These included president of: the Androscoggin Pulp Company (Brunswick, Maine); Sebago Wood Board Company (South Windham, Maine); Garvin Falls Power Company (Concord, New Hampshire); Mount Tom Sulphite Pulp Company (Mount Tom, Massachusetts); and Boston, New York, and Quebec Lumber Company.

From 1890 to 1891 he was president of the American Paper and Pulp Association, a trade association that engaged in lobbying for favorable government regulation of the papermaking industry and marketing initiatives to publicize their product. He also served on the board of directors of the Fitchburg Railroad, and was a member of Lawrence's Commercial Club.

=== Politics ===
A Republican, in 1867 Russell was elected to a term on Lawrence Board of Aldermen. He was a delegate to the Republican National Convention in 1868. Russell served as a member of the Massachusetts House of Representatives in 1869. He was a delegate to the 1876 Republican National Convention.

In 1878, Russell was elected to the U.S. House of Representatives. He was reelected twice and served in the Forty-sixth, Forty-seventh, and Forty-eighth Congresses (March 4, 1879 – March 3, 1885). In the House, Russell served initially on the Commerce Committee, where he was appointed to a subcommittee that sought ways to revitalize American manufacturing following the Panic of 1873, and recommended changes to tax laws as an incentive to economic growth. He later served on the Ways & Means Committee, where he used his knowledge of business and industry to advocate for protective tariffs favorable to American companies.

== Later life ==
After leaving Congress, Russell returned to his business interests and resided in Boston. In November 1898 he was one of two founders of the International Paper Company and he served as its first president.

Russell had been in poor health for the last year of his life. He died of a stroke at his home in Boston on January 10, 1899. Russell was buried at Bellevue Cemetery in Lawrence.

== Family ==
In February 1859, Russell married Elizabeth Haven Hall (1837–1866) in Bedford, Massachusetts. They were the parents of three children - Mary, Frances, and Grace.

In 1872 he married Frances Spofford Hall (1843–1925), the sister of his first wife. They were the parents of three children - William, Elizabeth, and Richard.

== Legacy ==
Russell donated his Prospect Hill estate in Lawrence to the creation of a hospital. The site became the grounds of Lawrence General Hospital.

== Sources ==
=== Newspapers ===
- Post, L. D. (January 12, 1899). "William A. Russell Dead". The Paper Mill and Wood Pulp News. New York, NY. p. 2 – via Google Books.

=== Books ===
- Belleau, Narcisse Fortunat (1870). Statutes of the Province of Quebec. Quebec City, Canada: Charles Francois Langlois. p. 132 – via Google Books.
- Dengler, Eartha; Katherine, Khalife; Ken, Skulski (1995). Images of America: Lawrence, Massachusetts. Charleston, SC: Arcadia Publishing. p. 72. ISBN 978-0-7385-9049-3 – via Google Books.
- Spencer, Thomas E. (1998). Where They're Buried. Baltimore, MD: Clearfield Company. p. 205. ISBN 978-0-8063-4823-0 – via Google Books.

U.S. House of Representatives
Preceded by Benjamin Butler	Member of the U.S. House of Representatives from Massachusetts's 7th congressional district March 4, 1879 – March 3, 1883	Succeeded by Eben F. Stone
Preceded by John W. Candler	Member of the U.S. House of Representatives from Massachusetts's 8th congressional district March 4, 1883 – March 3, 1885	Succeeded by Charles Herbert Allen
