= 1886 Massachusetts gubernatorial election =

- November 2, 1886
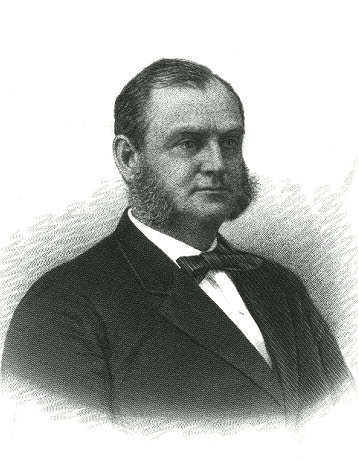

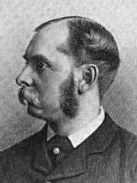
Nominee	Oliver Ames	John F. Andrew
Party	Republican	Democratic
Popular vote	122,346	112,883
Percentage	50.19%	46.31%
- Ames: 40–50% 50–60% 60–70% 70–80% 80–90% >90% Andrew: 40–50% 50–60% 60–70%
Governor before election
George D. Robinson
Republican
Elected Governor
Oliver Ames
Republican

The 1886 Massachusetts gubernatorial election was held on November 2, 1886. Incumbent Republican governor George D. Robinson did not run for re-election to a fourth term in office. He was succeeded by his lieutenant governor Oliver Ames, who defeated Democratic former state senator John F. Andrew.

== General election ==
=== Candidates ===
- Oliver Ames, lieutenant governor (Republican)
- John F. Andrew, former state senator from Boston (Democratic)
- Thomas J. Lothrop, candidate for governor in 1885 (Prohibition)
- George E. McNeill (independent)
- James Sumner, Greenback nominee for governor in 1885 (independent)

=== Results ===
1886 Massachusetts gubernatorial election
Party	Candidate	Votes	%	±%
Republican	Oliver Ames	122,346	50.19%	▼3.34
Democratic	John F. Andrew	112,883	46.31%	▲3.22
Prohibition	Thomas J. Lothrop	8,251	3.39%	▲1.14
Write-in	All others	128	0.05%	▼0.02
Independent	George E. McNeill	112	0.05%	N/A
Independent	James Sumner	49	0.02%	▼1.04
Total votes		243,769	100.00%	

== See also ==
- 1886 Massachusetts legislature
