= 1892 Massachusetts gubernatorial election =

- November 8, 1892
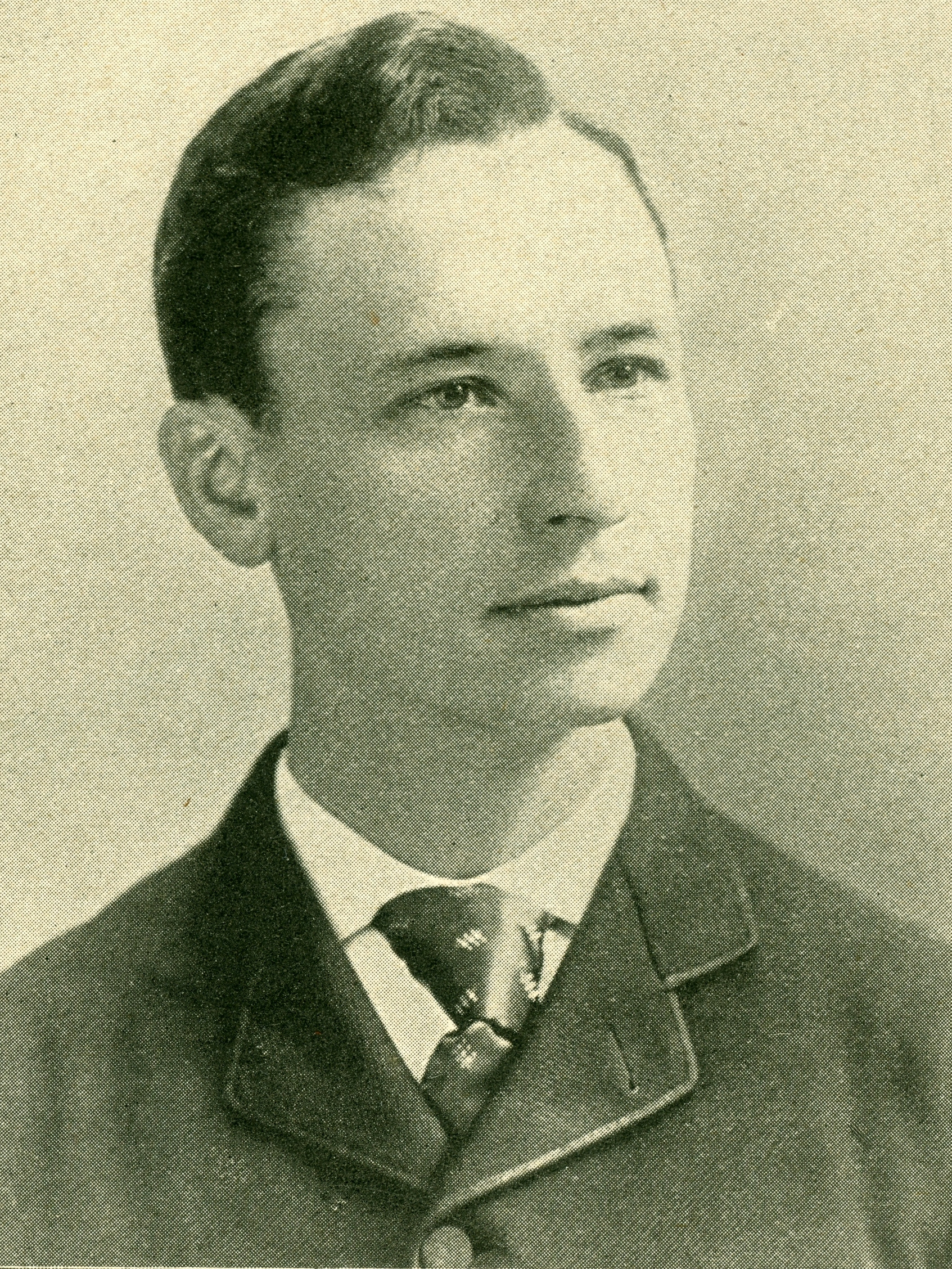

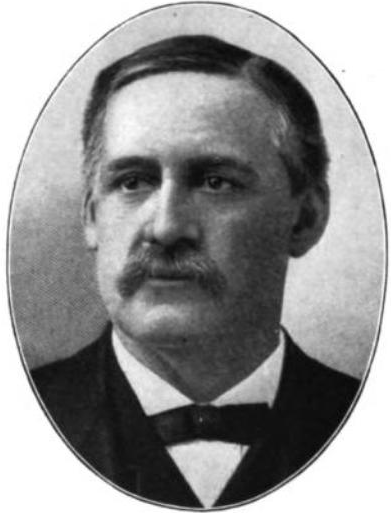
Nominee	William Russell	William H. Haile
Party	Democratic	Republican
Popular vote	186,377	183,843
Percentage	49.03%	48.36%
- Russell: 40-50% 50–60% 60–70% 70–80% Haile: 40-50% 50–60% 60–70% 70–80% 80–90% >90% Tie: 40-50%
Governor before election
William Russell
Democratic
Elected Governor
William Russell
Democratic

The 1892 Massachusetts gubernatorial election was held on November 8, 1892. Incumbent Democratic governor William Russell was re-elected to a third term in office over Republican Lt. Governor William H. Haile.

== General election ==
=== Candidates ===
- William H. Haile, lieutenant governor since 1890 (Republican)
- Wolcott Hamlin (Prohibition)
- Squire Putney (Socialist Labor)
- William Russell, incumbent governor since 1891 (Democratic)
- Henry Winn (Populist)

=== Results ===
1892 Massachusetts gubernatorial election
Party	Candidate	Votes	%	±%
Democratic	William E. Russell (incumbent)	186,377	49.03%	▼0.09
Republican	William H. Haile	183,843	48.36%	▲1.25
Prohibition	Wolcott Hamlin	7,067	1.86%	▼0.93
Populist	Henry Winn	1,976	0.52%	▼0.02
Socialist Labor	Squire E. Putney	871	0.23%	▼0.21
Write-in	All others	3	0.00%	Steady
Total votes		380,137	100.00%	

== See also ==
- 1892 Massachusetts legislature
