= William W. Rice =

American politician (1826–1896)

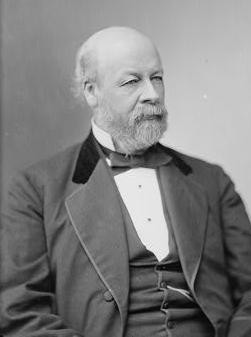
- Rice in 1888

Member of the U.S. House of Representatives from Massachusetts
- In office March 4, 1877 – March 3, 1887
- Preceded by: George Frisbie Hoar
- Succeeded by: John E. Russell
- Constituency: 9th district (1877–83); 10th district (1883–87)

Massachusetts House of Representatives
- In office 1875–1876

District Attorney of Worcester County, Massachusetts
- In office 1868–1873
- Preceded by: Hartley Williams
- Succeeded by: Hamilton B. Staples

Mayor of Worcester, Massachusetts
- In office 1860–1861
- Preceded by: Alexander H. Bullock
- Succeeded by: Peleg Emory Aldrich

Personal details
- Born: William Whitney Rice; March 7, 1826 Deerfield, Massachusetts, U.S.
- Died: March 1, 1896 (aged 69) Worcester, Massachusetts, U.S.
- Party: Free Soil Party, Republican
- Spouse(s): Cornelia A. Moen died June 16, 1862; m. September 28, 1876 Alice M. Miller
- Children: William Whitney Rice, Jr., Charles Moen Rice

William Whitney Rice (March 7, 1826 – March 1, 1896) was a U.S. representative from Massachusetts.

Born in Deerfield, Massachusetts, Rice attended Gorham Academy, Maine, and graduated from Bowdoin College in Brunswick, Maine, in 1846. He served as the preceptor of Leicester Academy, Leicester, Massachusetts from 1847 to 1851 before studying law in Worcester. He was admitted to the bar in 1854 and commenced practice in Worcester. In 1858 he was appointed judge of insolvency for Worcester County.

Rice was elected mayor of the city of Worcester in December 1859. He served as district attorney for the middle district of Massachusetts from 1868 to 1874 and was a member of the State house of representatives in 1875.

Rice was elected a member of the American Antiquarian Society in 1885.

Rice was elected as a Republican to the Forty-fifth and to the four succeeding Congresses (March 4, 1877 – March 3, 1887). After a failed re-election bid in 1886, he returned to Worcester and resumed the practice of law. He died there on March 1, 1896, at age 69, and was interred at Worcester Rural Cemetery.

== Rice family and relations ==
William was a direct descendant of Edmund Rice, an English immigrant to Massachusetts Bay Colony. He married Alice Miller (1840–1900), whose mother Nancy Merrick Miller was sister to Massachusetts judge Pliny T. Merrick. Alice's sister, Ruth Ann Miller, married U.S. Senator George Frisbie Hoar, making Rice and Hoar brothers-in-law. Alice founded a children's day nursery in Worcester.

== See also ==
- 1875 Massachusetts legislature

== Notes ==
U.S. House of Representatives
Preceded by George F. Hoar	Member of the U.S. House of Representatives from Massachusetts's 9th congressional district March 4, 1877 – March 3, 1883	Succeeded by Theodore Lyman
Preceded by Amasa Norcross	Member of the U.S. House of Representatives from Massachusetts's 10th congressional district March 4, 1883 – March 3, 1887	Succeeded by John E. Russell
