= Oliver, Nebraska =

Unincorporated community in Nebraska, U.S.

Coordinates: 41°13′46″N 103°47′17″W

Oliver is an unincorporated community in Kimball County, Nebraska, United States.

== History ==
Oliver was a station on the Union Pacific Railroad. The community was named for Oliver Ames, a railroad official.
