= Allen House (Lowell, Massachusetts) =

Historic house in Massachusetts, United States

- U.S. National Register of Historic Places
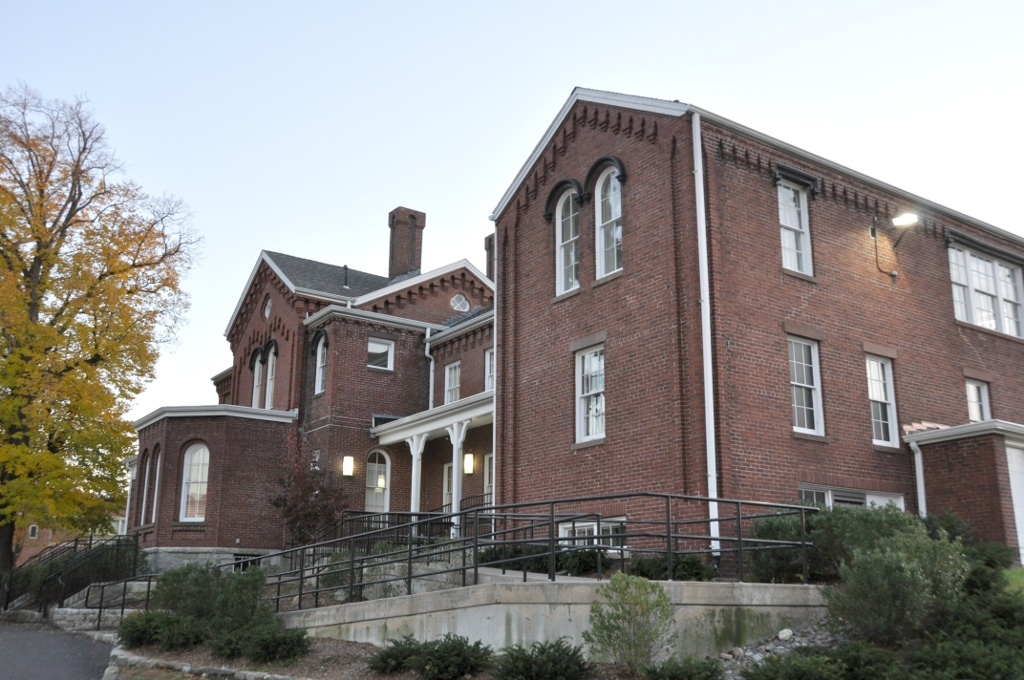

- Location within Massachusetts Location within the United States
- Location: 2 Solomont Way (listed at 57 Rolfe St.), Lowell, Massachusetts
- Coordinates: 42°38′33″N 71°20′12″W
- Area: less than one acre
- Built: 1854
- Architectural style: Italianate
- NRHP reference No.: 82001992
- Added to NRHP: August 11, 1982

Allen House, also known historically as The Terraces, is an historic house at 2 Solomont Way on the South Campus of the University of Massachusetts Lowell in Lowell, Massachusetts. Built about 1854, it is one of the city's finest early examples of Italianate architecture. In the early 20th century, it was the home of Charles Herbert Allen, a prominent local politician. Since 1957, it has been owned by the University of Massachusetts Lowell; restored in the 2000s, it houses a gallery and event space used for university programs and is home to the university's Honors College. It was listed on the National Register of Historic Places in 1982.

== Description and history ==
Allen House stands on the UMass Lowell South Campus. It is set on a rise above the Merrimack River, of which it has commanding views. It is an irregularly massed and somewhat rambling brick building, 2 1/2 stories in height, with a gabled roof. The gable ends are adorned with cloverleaf windows and there is brick drop ornamentation along the eaves. Some windows are set in round-arch openings. A bracketed Italianate porch is found on the front (east) side, and a Colonial Revival porch extends across part of the west side.

The house was built in the early 1860s as the mansion house of Rollin White, who invented a type of rear-loading revolver. White worked for Samuel Colt in Hartford, Connecticut for many years before moving to Lowell and establishing his own firearms company, later the Lowell Arms Company. The house was later the home of Charles Herbert Allen, a politician prominent in state politics and the first civilian U.S. governor of Puerto Rico.

== See also ==
- National Register of Historic Places listings in Lowell, Massachusetts
