= William H. Haile =

American politician

William Henry Haile
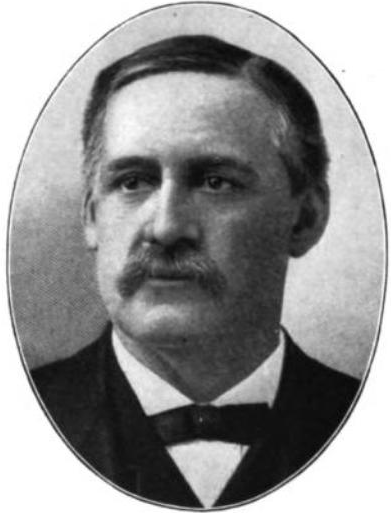

35th Lieutenant Governor of Massachusetts
- In office 1890–1893
- Governor: John Q. A. Brackett; William E. Russell
- Preceded by: John Q. A. Brackett
- Succeeded by: Roger Wolcott

Mayor of Springfield, Massachusetts
- In office 1881–1881
- Preceded by: Lewis J. Powers
- Succeeded by: Edwin E. Ladd

Member of the Massachusetts State Senate from the 1st Hampden District
- In office 1882–1883

Member of the New Hampshire House of Representatives
- In office 1865–1866
- In office 1871–1871

Personal details
- Born: September 23, 1833 Chesterfield, New Hampshire, U.S.
- Died: February 13, 1901 (aged 67) Springfield, Massachusetts, U.S.
- Party: Republican
- Spouse: Amelia L. Chapin
- Children: 3
- Profession: President of The Haile and Frost Manufacturing Company

William Henry Haile (September 23, 1833 – February 13, 1901) was an American businessman and politician who served as the Mayor of Springfield, Massachusetts, in 1881, and as the 35th lieutenant governor of Massachusetts from 1890 to 1893.

== Early life ==
Haile was born in Chesterfield, New Hampshire, on September 23, 1833, to William and Sabrana (Walker) Haile.

== Illness and death ==
Haile died of kidney trouble at his home on Chestnut Street, in Springfield, Massachusetts, on February 13, 1901. He had been ill for more than a year.

== Notes ==
Party political offices
Preceded by Charles Herbert Allen	Republican nominee for Governor of Massachusetts; 1892	Succeeded by Frederic T. Greenhalge
Political offices
Preceded by John Q. A. Brackett	Lieutenant Governor of Massachusetts; 1890 – 1893	Succeeded by Roger Wolcott
Preceded by Lewis J. Powers	Mayor of Springfield, Massachusetts; 1881 – 1881	Succeeded by Edwin E. Ladd
