= Oliver Ames (governor) =

19th-century American businessman, financier, and politician

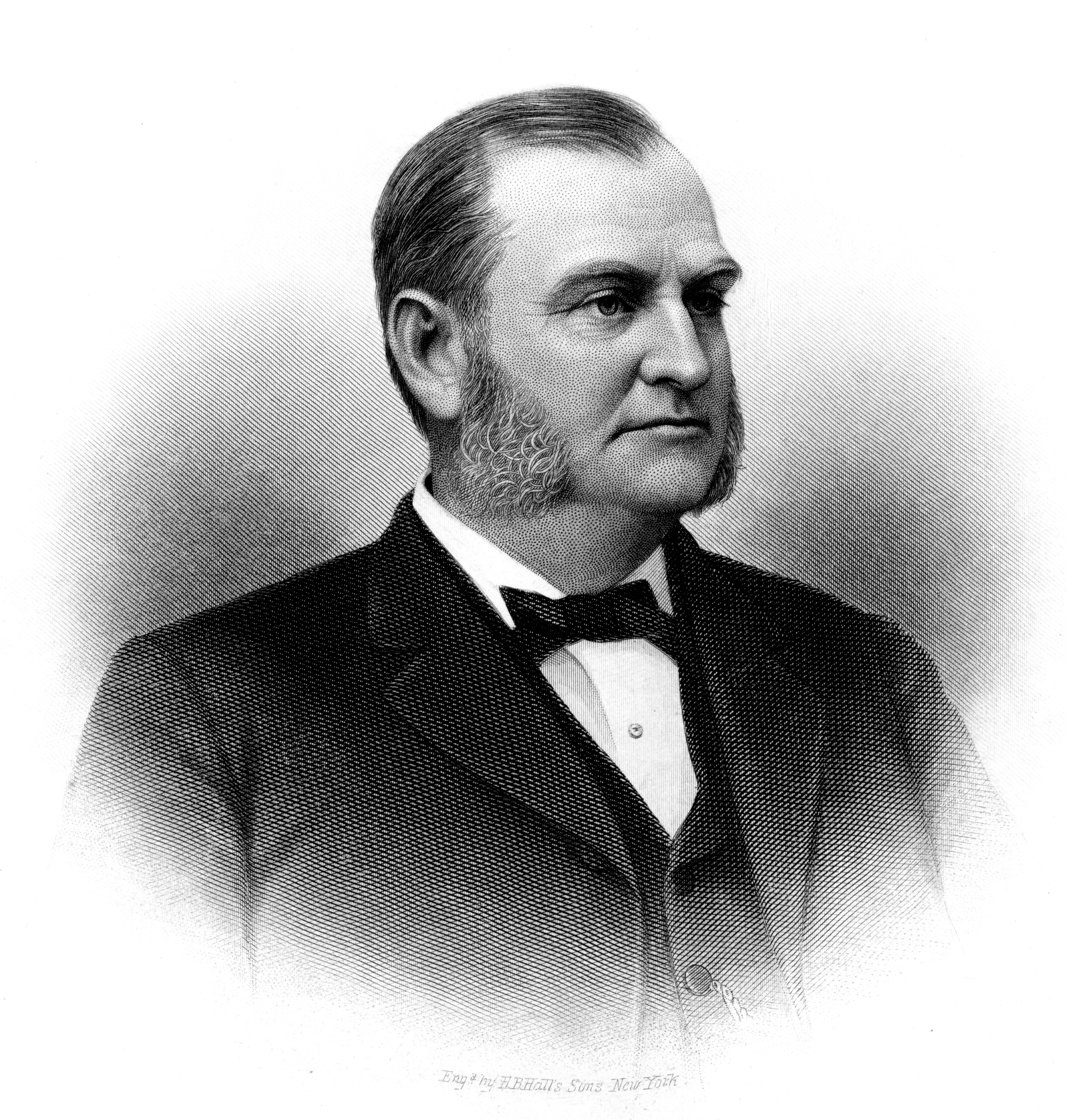

35th Governor of Massachusetts
- In office January 6, 1887 – January 7, 1890
- Lieutenant: John Q. A. Brackett
- Preceded by: George D. Robinson
- Succeeded by: John Q. A. Brackett

33rd Lieutenant Governor of Massachusetts
- In office January 4, 1883 – January 6, 1887
- Governor: Benjamin F. Butler; George D. Robinson
- Preceded by: Byron Weston
- Succeeded by: John Q. A. Brackett

Member of the Massachusetts Senate
- In office 1881–1882

Personal details
- Born: February 4, 1831 Easton, Massachusetts, U.S.
- Died: October 22, 1895 (aged 64) Easton, Massachusetts, U.S.
- Party: Republican
- Spouse: Anna Coffin Ray
- Children: Oakes Ames
- Relatives: Ames family
- Profession: Businessman, investor, philanthropist, politician

Oliver Ames (February 4, 1831 – October 22, 1895) was an American businessman, investor, philanthropist, and Republican politician who served as the 35th governor of Massachusetts from 1887 to 1890.

Ames's public life was primarily devoted to the vindication of his late father Oakes Ames, a businessman and U.S. Representative who was censured for his role in the 1873 Credit Mobilier scandal and died shortly thereafter. His tenure in office was also marked by a divide within the state over the growing temperance movement.

Ames was executor of his father's estate, and took over many of his business interests. He was a major philanthropist, especially in his hometown of Easton, where he secured construction of a number of architecturally significant works by the architect H.H. Richardson and a number of properties by landscape designer Frederick Law Olmsted.

Oliver Ames High School in Easton is named after him.

== Early life and education ==
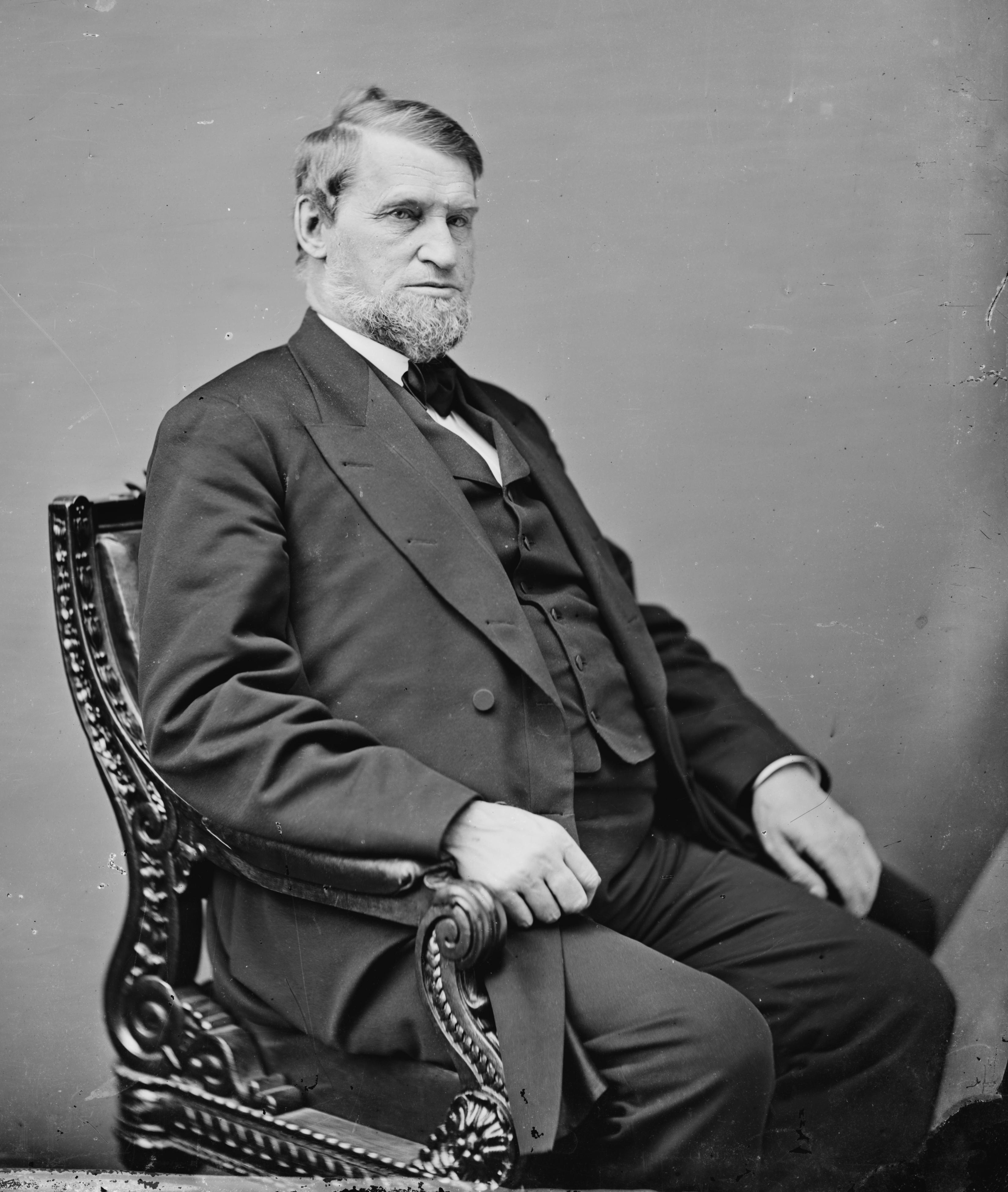
Oakes Ames

Oliver Ames was born in Easton, Massachusetts on February 4, 1831 to Eveline Orville (née Gilmore) and Oakes Ames. His father was the owner (with his father and brother, each also named Oliver) of Ames Shovel Shop, the largest manufacturer of shovels in the United States.

Ames was educated in the local schools, and then attended private academies in North Attleborough and Leicester. He was briefly employed at the family factory before enrolling at Brown University in 1851. He spent three years there in a custom-designed program overseen by university president Francis Wayland.

== Business career ==
After leaving Brown, Ames entered the family business, learning all aspects of its manufacturing processes and worked as a traveling salesman.

Ames served in the Massachusetts militia under the 4th Massachusetts Regiment, rising to the rank of lieutenant colonel in 1857, but resigned before the American Civil War began. During the war, he oversaw the company's manufacturing department, expanding the business and making the manufacturing processes more efficient. The family also invested in railroads and other industrial concerns. Oliver became a partner in the company when his grandfather Oliver Ames Sr. died in 1863.

=== Credit Mobilier scandal and death of Oakes Ames ===
Oakes and Oliver Ames Jr., Ames's father and uncle, were leading figures in the Union Pacific Railroad as well as principals in Crédit Mobilier of America, a shell corporation established by Union Pacific insiders to siphon profits from the railroad's construction. While a member of Congress, Oakes Ames sold shares of Crédit Mobiler to other Congressmen well below their estimated market value. When this was exposed in 1872, a congressional committee determined it a bribe for the purpose of influencing railroad legislation. The scandal resulted in Oakes Ames's censure and he died not long afterward.

Ames inherited his father's fortune, nationwide network of business interests, and $6–8 million in debt related to the scandal. He was also co-executor to his father's estate. Over a period of years, Ames was able to pay off the debts, provide more than $1 million in bequests, and divide the estate amongst the heirs.

=== Legal battle with Jay Gould ===
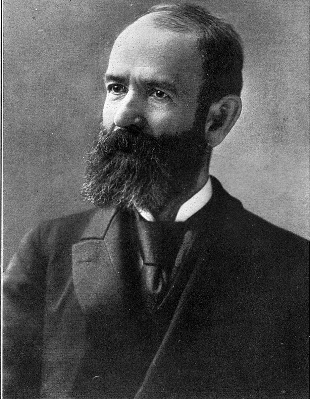
Jay Gould, who removed Ames from the Crédit Mobilier board of directors

In 1875, financier Jay Gould gained control of the Union Pacific, while a group of Ames-dominated Boston investors retained control of Crédit Mobilier.

Crédit Mobilier remained mired in legal action related to the scandal, and its shares were a major component of Oakes Ames's estate. The company's only major asset was a $2 million note against UP, and Ames instigated legal action to recover its value. Gould and Union Pacific countersued and conducted a hostile takeover of Crédit Mobilier, ousting Ames from the company's board and discontinuing its lawsuit. Ames launched legal action as a shareholder, and succeeded in forcing CM into receivership in 1879 with himself as the receiver. Their legal wrangling largely subsided in 1880, when most of the holdout shareholders were bought out by Gould.

During their fight, Ames sold Gould his controlling interest in the Central Branch Union Pacific Railroad, a separate paper railroad chartered to provide service in Kansas, at $250 per share. Ames made a large profit on the sale, which Gould purchased in order to assemble the pieces of a full transcontinental rail network under the Union Pacific umbrella.

== Early political career ==
Ames entered public life intent on vindicating his late father's memory. His early political activities included sitting on Easton's School Committee and chairing the local Republican Party committee.

=== State senator ===
He was elected to the Massachusetts State Senate in 1879 and saw to the incorporation of the new town of Cottage City, where he owned a summer home. He also sat on the committees overseeing railroads and schools. He was re-elected in 1881.

=== Lieutenant Governor of Massachusetts (1883–86) ===
In 1882, Ames was nominated for Lieutenant Governor of Massachusetts. Though he won his race, Republican Robert R. Bishop lost the gubernatorial election to Democrat Benjamin Butler in a bitterly divisive contest. Ames served from 1883 to 1886 under Butler (1883) and Republican George D. Robinson (1884–86).

In 1883, the Massachusetts legislature passed a resolution exonerating Ames's father and calling on Congress to reverse his censure. While in office, he also state's divestment from the New York, New Haven and Hartford Railroad and the Hoosac Tunnel at 1/3 of par value. He was at first criticized for the relatively low price, but it was later seen to be a good deal.

== Governor of Massachusetts (1887–90) ==
With Governor Robinson retiring in 1886, Ames won election as Governor of Massachusetts and served three one-year terms. A major political issues in his first two campaigns was his resignation from the state militia before the American Civil War. Ames countered criticisms by pointing out that he had hired a substitute to serve in his place and had financially supported the Union war effort.

As governor, Ames was a competent administrator, hiring and promoting more on the basis of merit than politics. In 1887 he signed a bill exempting military veterans from recently enacted civil service regulations, earning him the ire of the state's progressives. A project to expand the Massachusetts State House was approved during his tenure, and he in 1889 helped lay the cornerstone for its new elements.

=== Education ===
He advocated the improvement of public schools, as a counter to private religious schools. During his second term, he donated $1,000 to the College of the Holy Cross, which upset anti-Catholics in the state and cost him votes in his third election against William E. Russell.

=== Temperance ===
Ames supported the work of the Massachusetts Temperance Society but was opposed to the legislated prohibition of alcohol. He became unpopular with advocates of temperance. In 1889, the legislature passed a state constitutional amendment enacting prohibition, but it was voted down in the required popular referendum that followed.

== Retirement and death ==
In 1888, his health began to fail, probably due to the strain of office and his business interests. He refused to run for reelection in 1889, continuing a party tradition of three-term governors. After leaving office, he traveled to Europe several times to relax and recover his health. He died at his North Easton home in 1895.

== Personal life and legacy ==
=== Family ===
Ames married Anna Coffin Ray of Nantucket in 1860. The couple had six children. Their youngest son, Oakes Ames, was a well-known American botanist and orchid expert who owned palatial properties in Boston, Martha's Vineyard, and North Easton.

=== Honors ===
Ames was elected an honorary member of Phi Mu Alpha Sinfonia music fraternity in 1917, by the fraternity's Alpha Chapter at the New England Conservatory in Boston. He is the only known member to receive such a posthumous offer.

=== Legacy ===
Ames was a major financier of Easton's public high school, and it is named Oliver Ames High School in his honor. He is also the namesake of the small community of Oliver, Nebraska and of the schooner Governor Ames, in which he was invested.

With his cousin Frederick Lothrop Ames, Ames financed the construction of many projects designed by architect H. H. Richardson and landscape designer Frederick Law Olmsted in North Easton, including Oakes Ames Memorial Hall and the Ames Free Library. The site of these properties is now the H. H. Richardson Historic District of North Easton, a National Historic Landmark District.

Ames was a patron of sports and the arts. He owned Booth's Theatre in New York City and raised funds to send members of the Boston Athletic Association to the 1896 Summer Olympics.

He was at one time the president of the Merchants' Club of Boston, and he was also president of the Boston Art Club.

== Bibliography ==
- "The Nation". June 23, 1887.
- Bishop, Joseph T (January 1911). "Judge Robert Roberts Bishop". The Green Bag. 23 (1). ISSN 2160-6846. OCLC 1751575.
- Clarke, James W (1887). The Bay State Monthly: A Massachusetts Magazine of Literature, History, Biography and State Progress Vol. II. Boston: John N. McClintock and Company. OCLC 9960776.
- Cooper, Thomas; Fenton, Hector (1884). American politics (non-partisan) from the beginning to date. Chicago: C.R. Brodix. OCLC 10849147.
- Cutter, William (1916). American Biography: A New Cyclopedia, Volume 2. New York: American Historical Society. OCLC 3912467.
- Davis, William Thomas (1897). The New England states: their constitutional, judicial, educational, commercial, professional and industrial history, Volume 1. Boston: D.H. Hurd. OCLC 18090618.
- Fitzpatrick, Lillian L.; Link, J. T. (1960). Fairclough, G. Thomas (ed.). Nebraska Place-Names. Lincoln, Nebraska: University of Nebraska Press. ISBN 0-8032-5060-6.
- Grenon, Ingrid (2011). Lost Maine Coastal Schooners: From Glory Days to Ghost Ships. Charleston, SC: The History Press. ISBN 9781614231974. OCLC 944243013.
- Hennessy, Michael (1917). Twenty-five years of Massachusetts Politics. Boston: Practical Politics. p. 4. OCLC 1172863.
- Klein, Maruy (1997) [1986]. The Life and Legend of Jay Gould. Baltimore, MD: Johns Hopkins University Press. ISBN 9780801857713. OCLC 185835836.
- Klein, Maury (2006) [1987]. Union Pacific: 1862–1893. Minneapolis, MN: University of Minnesota Press. ISBN 9780816644599. OCLC 182530652.
- Purcell, Richard J (1928). "Ames, Oliver". Dictionary of American Biography. Vol. 1. New York: Scribners. pp. 254–256. OCLC 37255176.
- Roe, Alfred (January 1902). "The Governors of Massachusetts". The New England Magazine. 25 (6). OCLC 1644447.
- Sargent, Gerald (October 31, 1895). "Oliver Ames". Iron Age: 913–914. ISSN 0021-1508. OCLC 1753958.
- Tager, Jack (1999). "Ames, Oliver". Dictionary of American National Biography. Vol. 1. New York: Oxford University Press. pp. 425–426. ISBN 9780195206357. OCLC 39182280.
- Ulrich, Laurel Thatcher; et al. (2015). Tangible Things: Making History through Objects. New York: Oxford University Press. ISBN 9780199382293. OCLC 895047449.

Party political offices
Preceded by George D. Robinson	Republican nominee for Governor of Massachusetts; 1886, 1887, 1888	Succeeded by John Q. A. Brackett
Political offices
Preceded by Byron Weston	Lieutenant Governor of Massachusetts; 1883–1887	Succeeded by John Q. A. Brackett
Preceded by George D. Robinson	Governor of Massachusetts; 1887–1890	Succeeded by John Q. A. Brackett
