= John E. Russell =

American politician

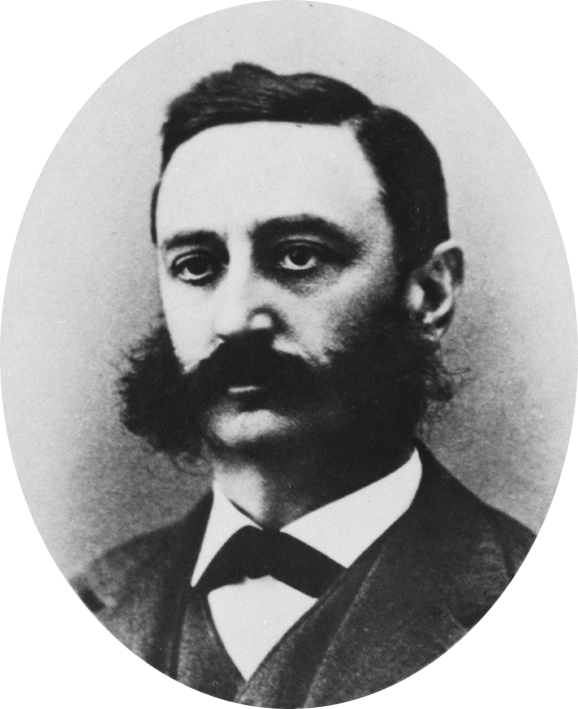

Member of the U.S. House of Representatives from Massachusetts's 10th district
- In office March 4, 1887 – March 3, 1889
- Preceded by: William W. Rice
- Succeeded by: Joseph H. Walker

Personal details
- Born: January 20, 1834 Greenfield, Massachusetts, U.S.
- Died: October 28, 1903 (aged 69) Leicester, Massachusetts, U.S.
- Resting place: Pine Grove Cemetery
- Party: Democratic

John Edwards Russell (January 20, 1834 – October 28, 1903) was a U.S. representative from Massachusetts.

Born in Greenfield, Massachusetts, Russell was instructed by private tutors. He returned to Massachusetts and became interested in mail transportation west of the Mississippi River and in steamship lines on the Pacific coast. He engaged in agricultural pursuits.

Russell was elected secretary of the Massachusetts State Board of Agriculture in 1880. He was reelected five times.

Russell was elected as a Democrat to the Fiftieth (March 4, 1887 – March 3, 1889). He served as delegate to the Democratic National Convention in 1892. He was an unsuccessful candidate for Governor of Massachusetts in 1893 and 1894. He served as member of the Deep Waterways Commission. He died in Leicester, Massachusetts, October 28, 1903. He was interred in Pine Grove Cemetery.

Party political offices
Preceded by William Russell	Democratic nominee for Governor of Massachusetts; 1893, 1894	Succeeded by George F. Williams
U.S. House of Representatives
Preceded by William W. Rice	Member of the U.S. House of Representatives from Massachusetts's 10th congressional district March 4, 1887 – March 3, 1889	Succeeded by Joseph H. Walker
