= William E. Russell (politician) =

American politician (1857–1896)

William Eustis Russell
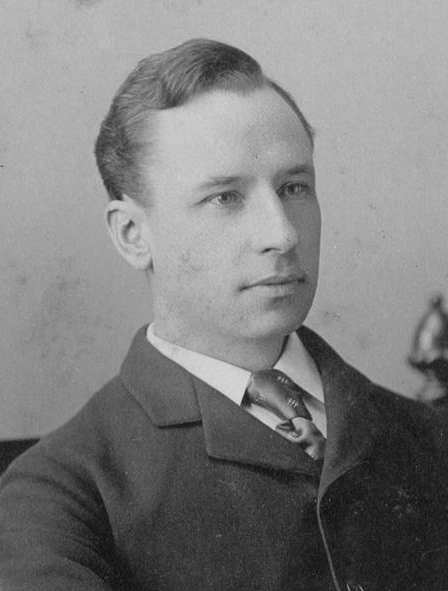
- Photo published in the 1890s

37th Governor of Massachusetts
- In office January 8, 1891 – January 4, 1894
- Lieutenant: William H. Haile; Roger Wolcott
- Preceded by: John Q. A. Brackett
- Succeeded by: Frederic T. Greenhalge

Mayor of Cambridge, Massachusetts
- In office 1884–1887
- Preceded by: James Augustus Fox
- Succeeded by: Henry Gilmore

Member of the Board of Aldermen of Cambridge, Massachusetts
- In office 1883–1884

Member of the Common Council of Cambridge, Massachusetts
- In office 1882–1882

Personal details
- Born: January 6, 1857 Cambridge, Massachusetts, US
- Died: July 16, 1896 (aged 39) Sainte-Adelaide-de-Pabos, Quebec, Canada
- Party: Democratic
- Spouse: Margaret Manning Swan

William Eustis Russell (January 6, 1857 – July 16, 1896) was an American lawyer and Democratic Party politician from Massachusetts. He served four terms as mayor of Cambridge, and was the 37th governor of Massachusetts, serving from 1891 to 1894. He was the state's second youngest-ever chief executive, and was the first Democrat since the American Civil War to serve more than one term in that office.

Educated at Harvard and Boston University Law School, Russell practiced law in the family firm. He was politically a conservative Democrat, supporting the presidential campaigns of Grover Cleveland and the gold standard for the national currency. He gave a speech in favor of the latter at the 1896 Democratic National Convention immediately prior to William Jennings Bryan's Cross of Gold speech, and refused efforts to draft him as an opponent to Bryan for the presidential nomination. About a week later, he died quite suddenly at a fishing camp in Quebec; he was 39. He was viewed by eastern Democrats as a future party leader and presidential contender.

== Family ==
William Eustis Russell was born in Cambridge, Massachusetts, the ninth child and fourth son of Charles Theodore Russell and Sarah Elizabeth (Ballister) Russell. On his father's side, he was descended from Thomas Hastings, and William Russell, both 17th-century settlers of Massachusetts, while his mother was of Huguenot descent. Russell's father was a politically active Democratic Party lawyer, who served as mayor of Cambridge 1861–62. Russell was the father of Cambridge mayor Richard M. Russell, and the great-grandfather of small government advocate Carla A. Howell and writer Thomas E. Ricks. In 1885, Russell married Margaret Manning Swan; they had three children.

== Education and early career ==
Russell attended Harvard College, graduating in 1877. He excelled at history, political economy, and ethics, and was poor in language, math, and chemistry. He was a member of the Hasty Pudding Club, and was an active participant in varsity sports, boxing, playing football, and on the school's rifle shooting squad, where he was considered an excellent marksman. He was also politically active, campaigning for Samuel J. Tilden in the 1876 presidential election.

In 1879, he received his law degree from the Boston University School of Law, and was the first to graduate summa cum laude from that school. While studying at BU he won the Lawrence prize for the best legal essay. He was admitted to the Massachusetts bar in 1880 and began the practice of law with his father's Boston firm, Russell & Russell, which also included his brother and uncle.

He entered politics in 1881, winning election to the Cambridge common council by a single vote, on a write-in "sticker campaign" started by friends without his knowledge. He was elected to the board of aldermen in 1883 and 1884.

== Mayor of Cambridge ==
Russell served as Mayor of Cambridge for four 1-year terms from 1885 to 1888, being reelected with no opposition at least twice, running on non-party tickets. When he took office, the city treasury was virtually empty, and it was saddled with a high tax rate. In his first year in office, Russell balanced the budget, funded the city's debt, and paid off its outstanding bills. He adopted the slogan "pay as you go" to exemplify his approach to city finances. During his tenure, he oversaw improvements in wide array of city services, include streets, sewers, fire, police, and health. Charles Eliot Norton opined that Cambridge was then the best-run city in the state.

Although Russell was personally opposed to the prohibition of alcohol, the city voted in 1886 to become dry, and he won favorable notice for enforcing the ban despite his opposition to it. He received mixed reviews for labor-related actions. In 1886, he successfully settled a meatpackers' strike, but in a February 1887 strike by the local horse railway, he called out the police to support strikebreakers, and (after two instances of violence) called out the militia to maintain order until the strike was broken.

While in office, Russell solicited sizable donations from philanthropist Frederick Hastings Rindge (a Harvard classmate) which made possible the construction of Cambridge City Hall, a Manual Training School (now Cambridge Rindge and Latin School), and Cambridge's public library. These were the first large-scale philanthropic gifts the city had received. Russell's efficient administration as mayor, particularly in the enforcement of the liquor ban, and his effective campaign speeches during the Presidential campaign of 1884 made him a prominent figure in state politics.

== Governor of Massachusetts ==
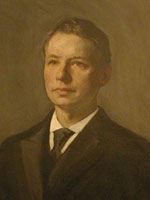
A 1900 portrait of Russell by Edmund C. Tarbell

In 1886, Russell declined a party effort to recruit him has a candidate for the U.S. Congress. He twice ran unsuccessfully for Governor of Massachusetts in 1888 and 1889, defeated by Oliver Ames and John Quincy Adams Brackett. He finally won the governorship in 1890 in a rematch of the 1889 contest with Brackett. The 1890 victory was part of a national backlash against Republican tariff legislation, overlaid by opposition within the state to Brackett's harsh enforcement of liquor laws. He was twice reelected, in 1891 and 1892, making him the first Democrat since the American Civil War to win more than one term as Massachusetts governor. His election as governor for three successive years was a result of his personal popularity: the majority of the legislature and state officials during his tenure were Republicans. His administration was marked by impartiality and lack of partisanship. As governor, several laws were passed on his recommendation, including a measure to regulate the activities of lobbyists, and another abolishing the property qualification for governor and the poll tax. Russell's administration also saw the beginning of an inheritance tax. He advocated and signed a series of pro-labor laws, and signed legislation establishing the Metropolitan District Commission (a state agency) and the Trustees of Reservations (a private charity) to preserve open spaces. He decided not to run for reelection in 1893, and resumed the practice of law.

== Later political activity ==
During the 1892 presidential campaign, there was talk of Russell being the vice presidential nominee if Senator John M. Palmer were to receive the Democratic presidential nomination. In early February 1892, Palmer and Patrick A. Collins, a former Democratic Massachusetts Congressman, agreed to make Palmer the Democratic presidential candidate and Russell, Collins' personal and political friend, the vice presidential candidate. Palmer ended up rejecting the bid, and argued against it at the 1892 Democratic National Convention. Russell received one vote for President on the first ballot.

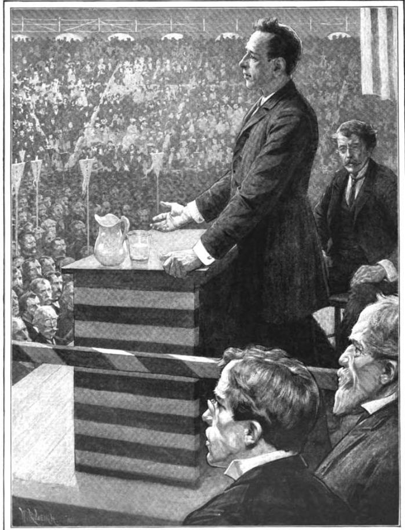
Engraved depiction of Russell addressing the 1896 Democratic Convention

Russell was one of the most active opponents of free silver during the 1896 presidential election. He announced his candidacy for President in April 1896, and garnered support and convention delegates in many states across the eastern United States, but he was harmed by lackluster support given by outgoing President Cleveland. In contrast to the eastern states, many midwestern and western states chose free silver delegations, dimming his prospects for the nomination. Russell categorically rejected the idea of becoming the nominee if the convention adopted a silver platform, and had to be coaxed into attending the 1896 Democratic National Convention. At the convention, after the silver platform was adopted, he refused to be considered for a third-party candidacy. He gave an impassioned speech in favor of the gold standard, which was immediately followed by William Jennings Bryan's famous Cross of Gold speech. Bryan's nomination for the presidency was seconded by a Massachusetts delegate George Fred Williams, who had bolted to the silver side after becoming a delegate, and was a prominent state intraparty opponent of Russell. Russell received two votes for President on the first ballot.

== Death and legacy ==
After the 1896 convention, Russell traveled to the Gaspé peninsula of eastern Quebec to escape the summer heat and political pressures. He died quite unexpectedly on the night of his arrival, July 16, 1896, in his sleep, at a camp on the Little Pabos River just north of Sainte-Adelaide-de-Pabos. The cause of death was ruled to be heart failure. Russell was buried at Mount Auburn Cemetery in Cambridge; his funeral was attended by President Cleveland.

In 1903, the William E. Russell School in Boston's Dorchester neighborhood, designed by James Mulcahy, was named in his honor. It still serves as an elementary school in the Boston Public Schools.

== Notes ==
Party political offices
Preceded by Henry B. Lovering	Democratic nominee for Governor of Massachusetts; 1888, 1889, 1890, 1891, 1892	Succeeded by John E. Russell
Political offices
Preceded by John Q. A. Brackett	Governor of Massachusetts; 1891–1894	Succeeded by Frederic T. Greenhalge
Preceded by James Augustus Fox	Mayor of Cambridge, Massachusetts; January 1885 – January 1889	Succeeded by Henry Gilmore
