= 1813–1814 Massachusetts legislature =

American state legislature

34th Massachusetts General Court
←	33rd	35th	→

Overview
- Legislative body: General Court
- Term: May 1813 – May 1814

Senate
- Members: 40
- President: John Phillips

House
- Speaker: Timothy Bigelow

The 34th Massachusetts General Court, consisting of the Massachusetts Senate and the Massachusetts House of Representatives, met in 1813 and 1814 during the governorship of Caleb Strong. John Phillips served as president of the Senate and Timothy Bigelow served as speaker of the House.

== Senators ==
- Jacob Abbot
- Samuel C. Allen
- Eli P. Ashmun
- Francis Blake
- Sylvester Brownel
- James Campbell
- Samuel Crocker
- Wendell Davis
- Thomas Dwight
- Walter Folger Jr.
- Edmund Foster
- Timothy Fuller
- Joshua Gage
- Joseph Heath
- Samuel Hoar
- Silas Holman
- John Holmes
- Nathaniel Hooper
- Wolcott Hubbell
- Lothrop Lewis
- Nahum Mitchell
- William Moody
- Thomas H. Perkins
- John Phillips
- Benjamin J. Porter
- Samuel Putnam
- Josiah Quincy
- William Read
- James Richardson
- Thomas Stephens
- Daniel Stowell
- Solomon Strong
- Bezaleel Taft
- Israel Thorndike
- John Varnum
- William Webber
- John Welles
- Daniel A. White
- Joseph Whiton
- Wilkes Wood

== See also ==
- 13th United States Congress
- List of Massachusetts General Courts
