= 1810–1811 Massachusetts legislature =

Legislative authority

31st Massachusetts General Court
| ← | 30th | 32nd | → |

Overview
- Legislative body: General Court
- Term: May 1810 – May 1811

Senate
- Members: 40
- President: Harrison Gray Otis

House
- Speaker: Perez Morton

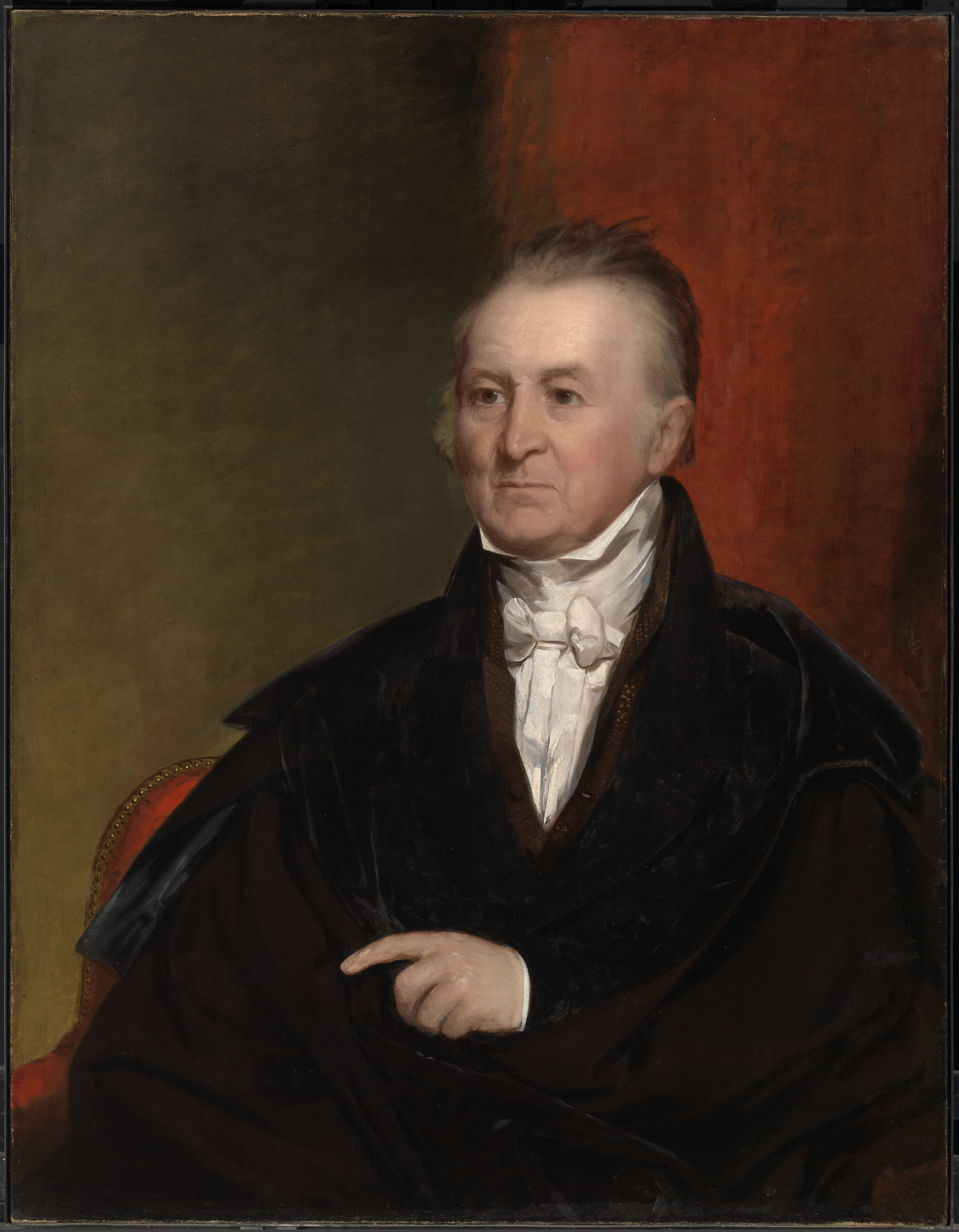
Harrison Gray Otis, Senate president.

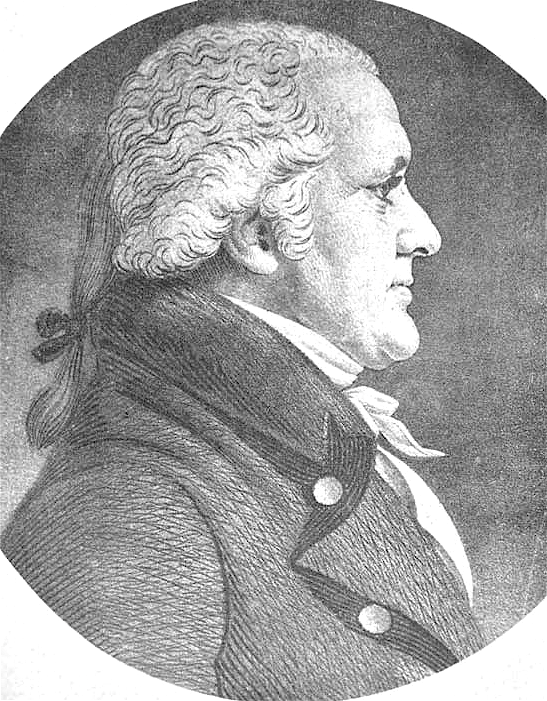
Perez Morton, House speaker.

Leaders of the Massachusetts General Court, 1810-1811.

The 31st Massachusetts General Court, consisting of the Massachusetts Senate and the Massachusetts House of Representatives, met in 1810 and 1811 during the governorship of Elbridge Gerry. Harrison Gray Otis served as president of the Senate and Perez Morton served as speaker of the House.

== Senators ==
- Eli P. Ashmun
- Israel Bartlett
- Francis Blake
- Amos Bond
- Matthew Bridge
- Elijah Brigham
- Peter C. Brooks
- Francis Carr
- Timothy Childs
- Joshua Cushman
- Samuel Dana
- Samuel Day
- Joseph Dimmick
- W. Folger Jr.
- Seth Hastings
- John Heard
- John Howe
- Levi Hubbard
- Jonas Kendall
- William King
- Samuel Lathrop
- Hugh McLellan
- James Means
- Nathaniel Morton Jr.
- Lonson Nash
- Harrison G. Otis
- John Phillips
- D. L. Pickman
- Edward Pope
- Alexander Rice
- William Spooner
- Seth Sprague
- Ezra Starkweather
- Israel Thorndike
- J. L. Tuttle
- William P. Walker
- John Welles
- Daniel A. White
- Nathan Willis
- John Woodman

== Representatives ==
- William Brown
- Samuel Cobb
- Jonathan Hunnewell
- Perez Morton
- William Smith
- Joseph Whiton

== See also ==
- 11th United States Congress
- 12th United States Congress
- List of Massachusetts General Courts
