= 1821–1822 Massachusetts legislature =

American state legislature

42nd Massachusetts General Court
←	41st	43rd	→

Overview
- Legislative body: General Court
- Term: May 1821 – May 1822

Senate
- Members: 40
- President: John Phillips

House
- Speaker: Josiah Quincy III, Luther Lawrence

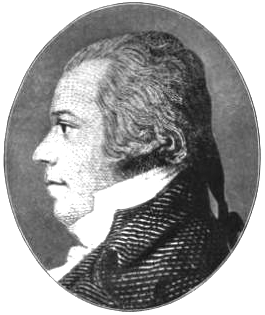
John Phillips, Senate president.

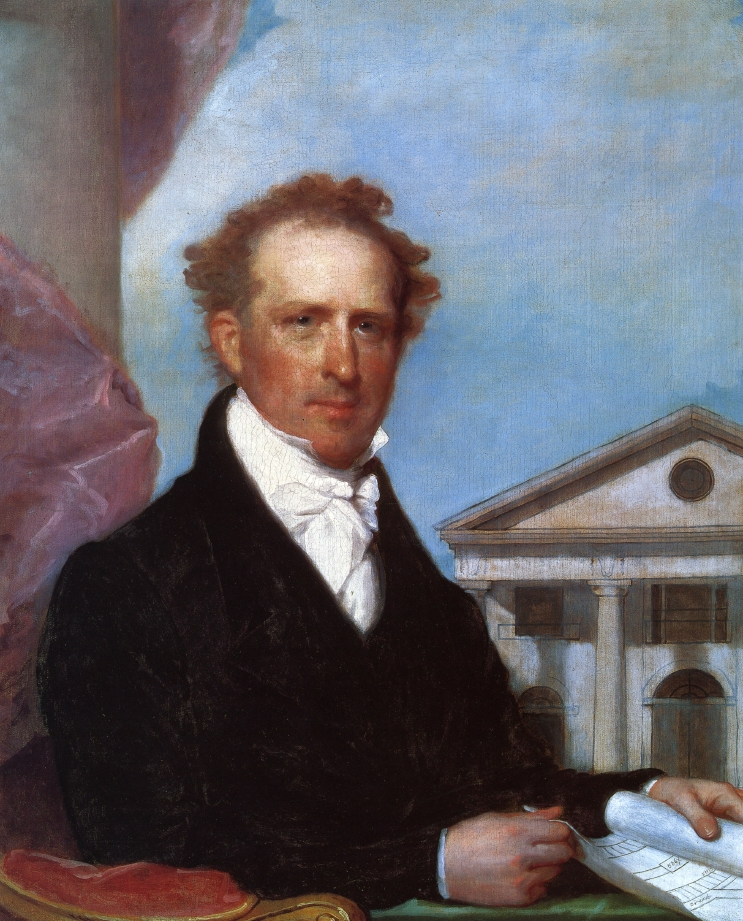
Josiah Quincy, House speaker.

Leaders of the Massachusetts General Court, 1821-1822.

The 42nd Massachusetts General Court, consisting of the Massachusetts Senate and the Massachusetts House of Representatives, met in 1821 and 1822 during the governorship of John Brooks. John Phillips served as president of the Senate. Josiah Quincy III and Luther Lawrence served as speakers of the House.

== Senators ==
- Phineas Allen
- William Austin
- Israel Bartlett
- William Bourne
- Hobart Clark
- Elijah Cobb
- Mark Doolittle
- Warren Dutton
- Jonathan Dwight Jr.
- Elihu Hoyt
- Jonathan Hunewell
- Nathaniel Jones
- John Glen King
- Alanson Knox
- Lemuel Moffit
- Ebenezer Moseley
- John Phillips
- Robert Rantoul
- Benjamin Reynolds
- John Ruggles
- Lemuel Shaw
- John Shepley
- Oliver Starkweather
- John Thomas
- Joseph Tilden
- Salem Town Jr.
- Aaron Tufts
- John Welles
- William Whittemore
- John M. Williams

== See also ==
- 17th United States Congress
- List of Massachusetts General Courts
