= 1818–1819 Massachusetts legislature =

American state legislature

39th Massachusetts General Court
←	38th	40th	→

Overview
- Legislative body: General Court
- Term: May 1818 – May 1819

Senate
- Members: 40
- President: John Phillips

House
- Speaker: Timothy Bigelow

The 39th Massachusetts General Court, consisting of the Massachusetts Senate and the Massachusetts House of Representatives, met in 1818 and 1819 during the governorship of John Brooks. John Phillips served as president of the Senate and Timothy Bigelow served as speaker of the House.

== Senators ==
- William B. Banister
- Israel Bartlett
- Solomon Bates
- Joseph Bemis
- James Campbell
- Nehem Cleaveland
- Jonathan Dwight Jr.
- John Endicott
- Samuel Fessenden
- Solomon Freeman
- Stephen P. Gardner
- Ebenezer Gay
- John Hart
- James Howland II
- Elihu Hoyt
- James Humphreys
- Jonathan Hunewell
- Caleb Hyde
- William King
- Samuel Lathrop
- Archelaus Lewis
- James Lloyd
- Jonathan H. Lyman
- William Moody
- Daniel Noble
- Leonard M. Parker
- John Phillips
- Dudley L. Pickman
- Josiah Quincy
- Alexander Rice
- Andrew Ritchie
- Elisha Ruggles
- Leverett Saltonstall
- Samuel Small
- Joseph B. Varnum
- Daniel Waldo
- Artemas Ward
- John M. Williams
- William D. Williamson

== See also ==
- 15th United States Congress
- 16th United States Congress
- List of Massachusetts General Courts
