= 1812–1813 Massachusetts legislature =

American state legislature

33rd Massachusetts General Court
←	32nd	34th	→

Overview
- Legislative body: General Court
- Term: May 1812 – May 1813

Senate
- Members: 40
- President: Samuel Dana

House
- Speaker: Timothy Bigelow

The 33rd Massachusetts General Court, consisting of the Massachusetts Senate and the Massachusetts House of Representatives, met in 1812 and 1813 during the governorship of Caleb Strong. Samuel Dana served as president of the Senate and Timothy Bigelow served as speaker of the House.

== Senators ==
- Samuel C. Allen
- Samuel Barstow
- Joseph Bemis
- Matthew Bridge
- Peter C. Brooks
- B. W. Crowninshield
- Samuel Dana
- John Dillingham
- Walter Folger
- Erastus Foote
- Joseph Fuller III
- Thomas Hazard, Jr.
- Silas Holman
- Thomas Kittredge
- Levi Lincoln Jr.
- William Moody
- Harrison G. Otis
- Jonathan Page
- James Parker
- John Phillips
- Eben. Poor
- Benja. J. Porter
- Wm. Reed
- Alexander Rice
- Eleazer W. Ripley
- Jonathan Smith, Jr.
- Seth Sprague
- John Spurr
- Ezra Starkweather
- Thomas Stephens
- Amasa Stetson
- Solomon Strong
- Israel Thorndike
- Joseph Tisdale
- William Towner
- John L. Tuttle
- William Webber
- John Welles
- Daniel A. White
- Nathan Willis

== Representatives ==
- William Smith
- Joseph Whiton
- Samuel Cobb
- Wm. Brown
- Jonathan Hunnewell
- Benja. Ruffel
- Benja. Whitman
- Charles Davis
- James Robinson
- William Hammatt
- John Parker
- Isaac P. Davis
- Charles Jackson
- William H. Sumner
- Ephraim Thayer
- Josiah Knapp
- Benjamin Weld
- Oliver Keating
- Nathan Webb
- Daniel Messenger
- George G. Lee
- Wm. Porter
- John May

== See also ==
- Gerrymandering in the United States
- 12th United States Congress
- 13th United States Congress
- List of Massachusetts General Courts
