= 1822–1823 Massachusetts legislature =

American state legislature

43rd Massachusetts General Court
←	42nd	44th	→

Overview
- Legislative body: General Court
- Term: May 1822 – May 1823

Senate
- Members: 40
- President: John Phillips

House
- Speaker: Levi Lincoln Jr.

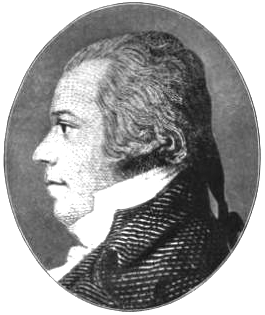
John Phillips, Senate president

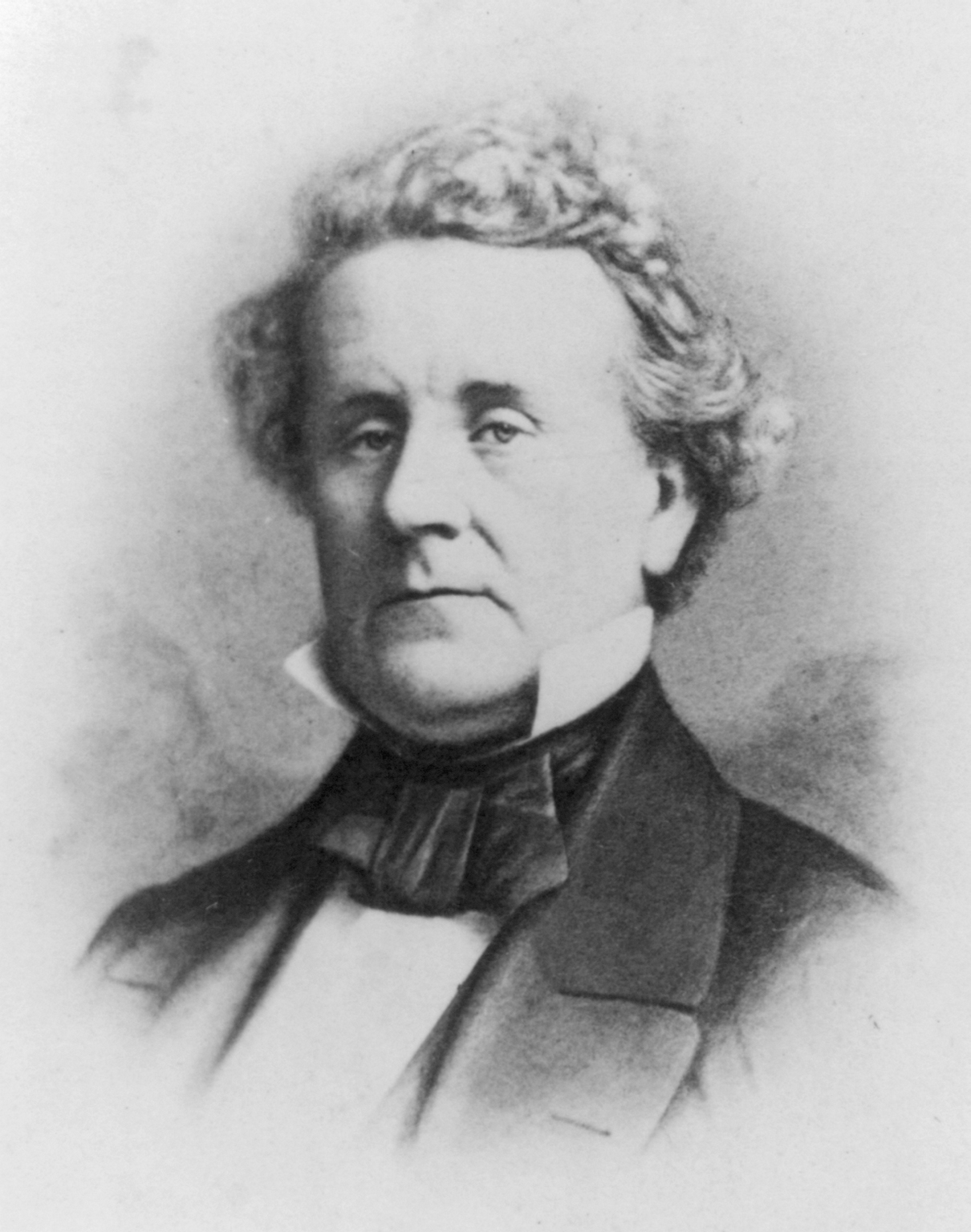
Levi Lincoln Jr., house speaker

Leaders of the Massachusetts General Court, 1822-1823.

The 43rd Massachusetts General Court, consisting of the Massachusetts Senate and the Massachusetts House of Representatives, met in 1822 and 1823 during the governorship of John Brooks. John Phillips served as president of the Senate and Levi Lincoln Jr. served as speaker of the House.

== Senators ==
- John Abbot
- Benjamin Adams
- Jonathan Allen
- William Austin
- Hobart Clark
- Elijah Cobb
- Joel Cranston
- Nathaniel M. Davis
- Jethro Dogget
- Jonathan Dwight Jr.
- Lewis Fisher
- Waller Folger Jr.
- James Fowler
- Stephen P. Gardner
- Nathaniel Hooper
- Elihu Hoyt
- Jonathan Hunewell
- Nathaniel Jones
- John Glen King
- Thomas Longley
- Lemuel Moffit
- Benjamin Osgood
- Cushing Otis
- Thomas H. Perkins
- John Phillips
- Edward S. Rand
- Rohert Rantoul
- Benjamin Reynolds
- Thomns Rotch
- John Ruggles
- Benjamin Russell
- Lemuel Shaw
- Oliver Starkweather
- Lewis Strong
- Joseph Strong Jr.
- Levi Thaxter
- Joseph Tilden
- Salem Town Jr.
- Aaron Tufts
- Timothy Walker

== Representatives ==
- Lynde Walter

== See also ==
- 17th United States Congress
- 18th United States Congress
- List of Massachusetts General Courts
