= 1809–1810 Massachusetts legislature =

American state legislature

30th Massachusetts General Court
←	29th	31st	→

Overview
- Legislative body: General Court
- Term: May 1809 – May 1810

Senate
- Members: 40
- President: Harrison Gray Otis

House
- Speaker: Timothy Bigelow

The 30th Massachusetts General Court, consisting of the Massachusetts Senate and the Massachusetts House of Representatives, met in 1809 and 1810 during the governorship of Christopher Gore. Harrison Gray Otis served as president of the Senate and Timothy Bigelow served as speaker of the House.

== Senators ==
- Eli P. Ashmun
- Amos Bond
- Matth. Bridge
- Elijah Brigham
- Peter C. Brooks
- Francis Carr
- Timothy Childs
- Joshua Cushman
- Samuel Dana
- Samuel Day
- Joseph Dimmick
- Azariah Eggleston
- Samuel Fales
- Walter Folger Jr.
- Thomas Hale
- John Heard
- John Howe
- Jonas Kendall
- William King
- Samuel Lathrop
- Lothrop Lewis
- Hugh McLellan
- James Means
- Harrison G. Otis
- John Phillips (Suffolk county)
- John Phillips (Essex county)
- Edward Pope
- Samuel Putnam
- Alexander Rice
- William Spooner
- Seth Sprague
- Ezra Starkweather
- Israel Thorndike
- Nathaniel Thurston
- Enoch Titcomb
- Salem Towne
- J. L. Tuttle
- John Welles
- Nathan Willis
- John Woodman

== Representatives ==
- William Smith

== See also ==
- 11th United States Congress
- List of Massachusetts General Courts
