= 1820–1821 Massachusetts legislature =

Massachusetts legislature in 1820 and 1821

41st Massachusetts General Court
←	40th	42nd	→

Overview
- Legislative body: General Court
- Term: May 1820 – May 1821

Senate
- Members: 40
- President: John Phillips

House
- Speaker: Elijah H. Mills

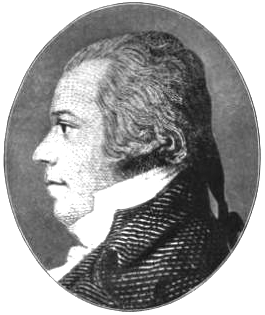
John Phillips, Senate president.

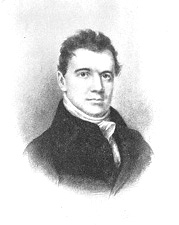
Elijah Mills, House speaker.

Leaders of the Massachusetts General Court, 1820-1821.

The 41st Massachusetts General Court, consisting of the Massachusetts Senate and the Massachusetts House of Representatives, met in 1820 and 1821 during the governorship of John Brooks. John Phillips served as president of the Senate and Elijah H. Mills served as speaker of the House.

== Senators ==
- Phinehas Allen
- Israel Bartlett
- Lewis Bigelow
- William Bourne
- Peter C. Brooks
- Hobart Clark
- Mark Doolittle
- Jonathan Dwight Jr.
- Samuel Eastman
- Solomon Freeman
- Stephen P. Gardner
- Benjamin Gorham
- James Howland
- Jonathan Hunewell
- Caleb Hyde
- Thomas Longley
- Jonathan H. Lyman
- Ebenezer Moseley
- Leonard M. Parker
- John Phillips
- Dudley L. Pickman
- Robert Rantoul
- Benjamin Reynolds
- John Ruggles Jr.
- William Sullivan
- John Thomas
- Aaron Tufts
- Joseph B. Varnum
- John Welles
- William Whittemore
- John M. Williams

== Historical Context: The Separation of Maine ==
One of the most critical developments during the 41st General Court was the culmination of the movement for Maine's statehood. Until 1820, Maine had been a district of Massachusetts, governed as part of the Commonwealth since 1647. Over time, as Maine's population grew and its political identity became distinct from that of Massachusetts, the people of Maine campaigned for independence. This effort, which began in earnest after the American Revolution, faced resistance from some factions in Massachusetts but ultimately succeeded when the General Court consented to the separation in 1819.

Maine officially became a state on March 15, 1820, as part of the Missouri Compromise. This compromise balanced the admission of Maine as a free state with the admission of Missouri as a slave state, maintaining the delicate balance between free and slave states in the U.S. Senate. The passage of this legislation by the Massachusetts legislature marked the end of Massachusetts' territorial control over the region and led to significant demographic and economic changes for both Massachusetts and Maine.

== Political changes ==
The Massachusetts General Court of 1820–1821 also oversaw important political reforms and adjustments. One notable outcome was the constitutional convention of 1820, which addressed several governance issues within the state. These included:

1. Reform of the Legislative Calendar: The political year was changed, moving the start of the legislative session from the first Wednesday of May to the first Wednesday of January, which affected how elections were conducted and how legislative terms were organized.
2. Changes in Representation: The size of the Massachusetts House of Representatives was restructured, capping the number of representatives at 275 and adjusting the formula for representation based on town populations. This change aimed to better balance representation between larger and smaller towns.
3. Expansion of Voting Rights: Property and tax restrictions on voting were largely eliminated, allowing all male citizens over the age of 21, except paupers, to vote if they had lived in the state for one year.

== Leadership and Key Members ==
John Phillips served as president of the Massachusetts Senate, a role that gave him significant influence over legislative proceedings. Phillips was a prominent figure in Massachusetts politics, later becoming the first mayor of Boston.

Elijah H. Mills served as the speaker of the House of Representatives during this period. Mills was a Federalist lawyer and politician from Northampton, Massachusetts, who later became a U.S. Senator. His leadership helped guide the General Court through the complex political challenges of the time.

== See also ==
- Massachusetts Constitutional Convention of 1820–1821
- 16th United States Congress
- 17th United States Congress
- List of Massachusetts General Courts
