= 1825–1826 Massachusetts legislature =

American state legislature

46th Massachusetts General Court
←	45th	47th	→

Overview
- Legislative body: General Court
- Term: May 1825 – May 1826

Senate
- Members: 40
- President: Nathaniel Silsbee

House
- Speaker: Timothy Fuller

Sessions
- 1st: May 25, 1825 – June 18, 1825
- 2nd: January 4, 1826 – March 4, 1826

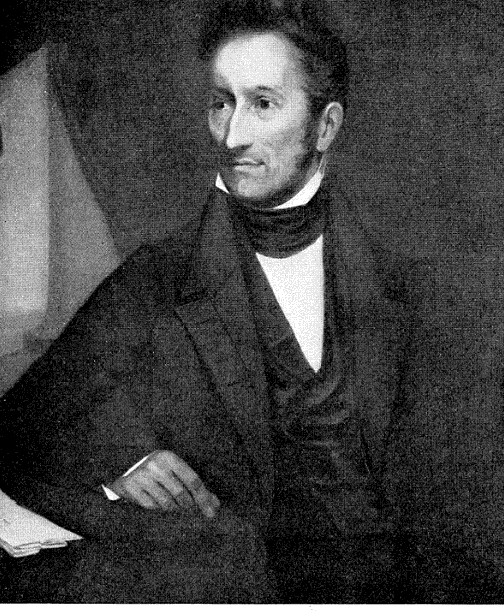
Nathaniel Silsbee, Senate president.

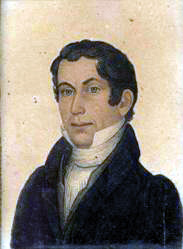
Timothy Fuller, House speaker.

Leaders of the Massachusetts General Court, 1825-1826.

The 46th Massachusetts General Court, consisting of the Massachusetts Senate and the Massachusetts House of Representatives, met in 1825 and 1826 during the governorship of Levi Lincoln Jr. Nathaniel Silsbee served as president of the Senate and Timothy Fuller served as speaker of the House.

== Senators ==
- James T. Austin
- William Baylies
- Barker Burnell
- William Crawford, Jr.
- Braddock Dimmick
- William Eaton
- Benjamin Ellis
- William Ellis
- Josiah J. Fiske
- Henry Gardner
- Francis C. Gray
- Geo. Grennell Jr.
- Jacob Hall
- Rodman Hazard
- Samuel Hoar, Jr.
- Nathaniel Houghton
- Abel Jewett
- Joseph G. Kendall
- John Keyes
- John G. King
- Seth Knowles
- Thomas Longley
- Elihu Lyman
- David Mack, Jr.
- John Mason
- John Mills
- Nathan Noyes
- Solomon Pratt
- John Prince
- Benjamin Russell
- Micah M. Rutter
- James Savage
- Samuel Shears
- Nathaniel Silsbee
- Bezaleel Taft, Jr.
- Joseph Tripp
- Stephen White
- Justice Willard
- Moses Wingate
- Thomas L. Winthrop

== Representatives ==
- Redford Webster

== See also ==
- 19th United States Congress
- List of Massachusetts General Courts
