= 1853 Massachusetts legislature =

American state legislature

74th Massachusetts General Court
←	73rd	75th	→

Overview
- Legislative body: General Court

Senate
- Members: 40
- President: Charles Henry Warren

House
- Members: 288
- Speaker: George Bliss

Sessions
- 1st: January 5, 1853 – May 25, 1853

The 74th Massachusetts General Court, consisting of the Massachusetts Senate and the Massachusetts House of Representatives, met in 1853 during the governorship of John H. Clifford. Charles Henry Warren served as president of the Senate and George Bliss served as speaker of the House.

== Senators ==
- Alfred A. Abbott
- Benjamin Adams
- Willard Blackinton
- Osmyn Brewster
- Francis Brinley
- Thomas G. Cary
- John J. Clarke
- Horace Collamore
- Charles E. Cook
- Henry H. Cook
- James B. Crocker
- Allen Cummings
- Samuel Davenport
- George Dwight
- John Earle
- Winthrop E. Faulkner
- Sullivan Fay
- Calvin Fisher, Jr.
- Edward B. Gillett
- Horace Henderson
- N. S. How
- George Howland, Jr.
- Ensign H. Kellogg
- J. S. C. Knowlton
- John W. Loud
- Micajah Lunt
- Benjamin Manter
- Elisha Murdock
- Samuel D. Parker
- Sanford B. Perry
- Ivers Phillips
- Caleb W. Prouty
- Henry Russell
- Joseph Smith
- Noah L. Strong
- Charles Thurber
- Freeman Walker
- Charles H. Warren
- George W. Warren
- Cyrus Weeks
- Thomas Wright

== See also ==
- Massachusetts Constitutional Convention of 1853
- 33rd United States Congress
- List of Massachusetts General Courts
