= 1824–1825 Massachusetts legislature =

American state legislature

45th Massachusetts General Court
←	44th	46th	→

Overview
- Legislative body: General Court
- Term: May 1824 – May 1825

Senate
- Members: 40
- President: Nathaniel Silsbee

House
- Speaker: William C. Jarvis

Sessions
- 1st: May 26, 1824 – June 12, 1824
- 2nd: January 5, 1825 – February 26, 1825

The 45th Massachusetts General Court, consisting of the Massachusetts Senate and the Massachusetts House of Representatives, met in 1824 and 1825 during the governorship of William Eustis. Nathaniel Silsbee served as president of the Senate and William C. Jarvis served as speaker of the House.

== Senators ==
- Benjamin Adams
- Barker Burnell
- Nathaniel P. Denny
- Braddock Dimmick
- Josiah J. Fiske
- James Fowler
- Stephen P. Gardner
- Francis C. Gray
- George Grennell, Jr.
- Rodman Hazard
- James L. Hodges
- Samuel Hubbard
- George Hull
- Joseph G. Kendall
- John Keyes
- Seth Knowles
- Sherman Leland
- Heman Lincoln
- Aaron Lummus
- Theodore Lyman II
- David Mack, Jr.
- John Mason
- John Mills
- John Nevers
- Nathan Noyes
- George Odiorne
- William W. Parrott
- Solomon Pratt
- John Prince
- Joseph Richardson
- John Ruggles
- Micah M. Rutter
- Nathaniel Silsbee
- Seth Sprague
- Joseph Strong
- Levi Thaxter
- Aaron Tufts
- John Wade
- Moses Wingate
- Thomas L. Winthrop

== See also ==
- 18th United States Congress
- List of Massachusetts General Courts
