= 1819–1820 Massachusetts legislature =

American state legislature

40th Massachusetts General Court
←	39th	41st	→

Overview
- Legislative body: General Court
- Term: May 1819 – May 1820

Senate
- Members: 40
- President: John Phillips

House
- Speaker: Timothy Bigelow

The 40th Massachusetts General Court, consisting of the Massachusetts Senate and the Massachusetts House of Representatives, met in 1819 and 1820 during the governorship of John Brooks. John Phillips served as president of the Senate and Timothy Bigelow served as speaker of the House.

== Senators ==
- Samuel Adams
- Phineas Allen
- William B. Banister
- Israel Bartlett
- Lewis Bigelow
- James Campbell
- John Chandler
- Jonathan Dwight Jr.
- Samuel Eastman
- John Endicott
- Solomon Freeman
- Ralph H. French
- Stephen P. Gardner
- Ebenezer Gay
- Benjamin Gorham
- Mark Harris
- John Hart
- Aaron Hobart
- James Howland
- Elihu Hoyt
- Jonathan Hunewell
- Caleb Hyde
- James Irish
- William King
- Thomas Longly
- Jonathan H. Lyman
- William Moody
- John Moor
- Leonard M. Parker
- John Phillips
- Josiah Quincy
- Benjamin Reynolds
- Alexander Rice
- Andrew Ritchie
- Leverett Saltonsall
- Aaron Tufts
- Joseph B. Varnum
- Artemas Ward
- John M. Williams
- William D. Williamson

== See also ==
- 16th United States Congress
- List of Massachusetts General Courts
