= 1781–1782 Massachusetts legislature =

American state legislature

2nd Massachusetts General Court
←	1st	3rd	→

Overview
- Legislative body: General Court
- Meeting place: State House (State Street)
- Term: May 1781 – May 1782

Senate
- Members: 40
- President: Jeremiah Powell, Samuel Adams

House
- Speaker: Caleb Davis

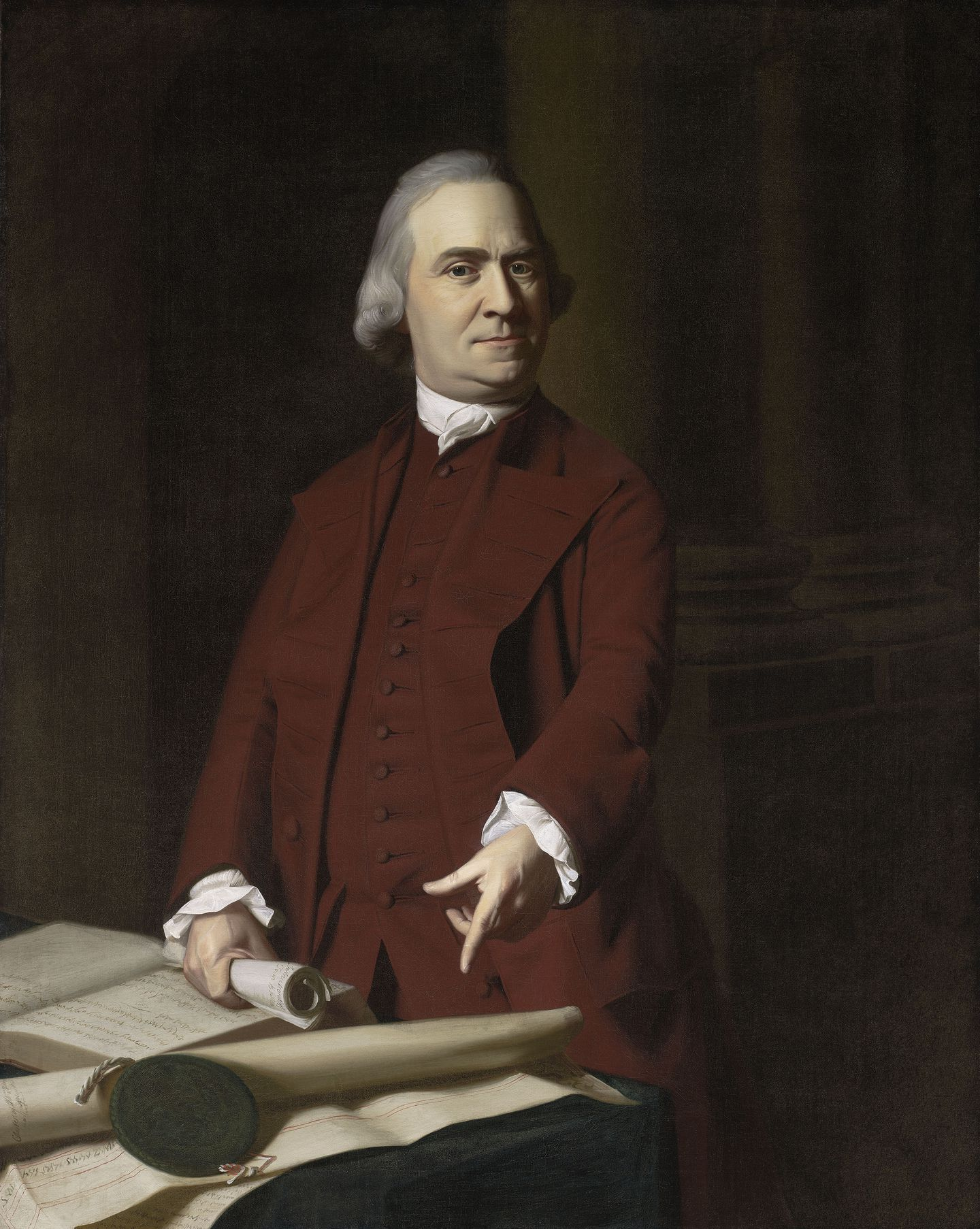
Samuel Adams, Senate president.

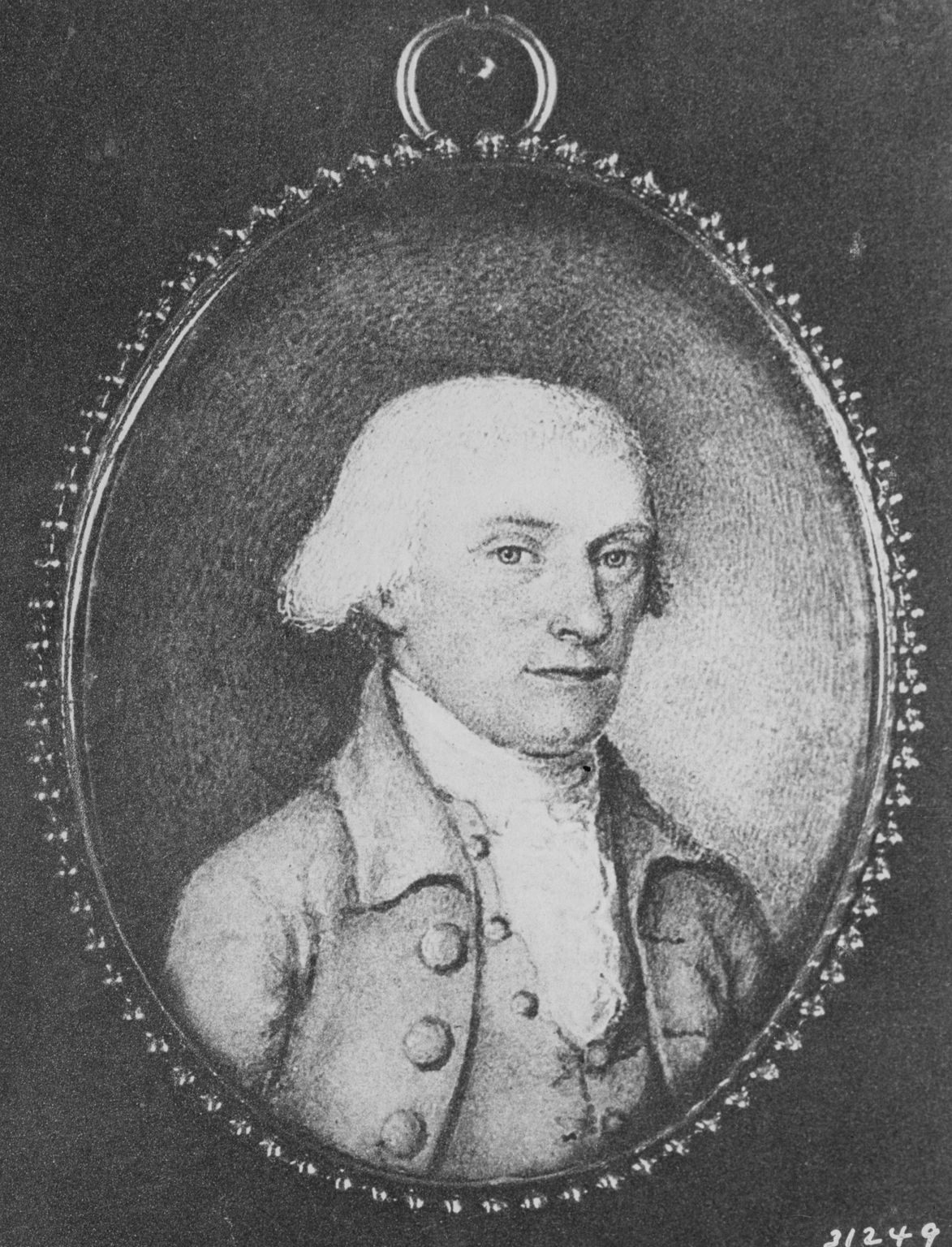
Caleb Davis, House speaker.

Leaders of the Massachusetts General Court, 1781-1782.

The 2nd Massachusetts General Court, consisting of the Massachusetts Senate and the Massachusetts House of Representatives, met in 1781 and 1782 during the governorship of John Hancock. Jeremiah Powell and Samuel Adams served as presidents of the Senate and Caleb Davis served as speaker of the House.

== Senators ==
- Samuel Adams
- John Bacon
- Samuel Baker
- John Bliss
- Ebenezer Bridge
- Eleazer Brooks
- Stephen Choate
- Edward Cutts
- Joseph Dorr
- Thomas Durfee
- Jabez Fisher
- Solomon Freeman
- Abraham Fuller
- John Goodman
- Jonathan Greenleaf
- John Hastings
- Joseph Hosner
- Israel Nichols
- Samuel Phillips Jr.
- John Pitts
- Jedediah Prebble
- Thomas Rice
- William Sever
- Eph. Starkweather
- Increase Sumner
- Cotton Tufts
- Charles Turner
- Jonathan Warner
- Aaron Wood
- Jahleel Woodbridge

== Representatives ==
- Caleb Davis
- Samuel A. Otis
- John Rowe

== See also ==
- List of Massachusetts General Courts
