= 17th Massachusetts General Court (1796–1797) =

List of Massachusetts legislators 1796

←	16th	18th	→

Overview
- Legislative body: General Court
- Meeting place: State House
- Term: May 1796 – May 1797

Senate
- Members: 40
- President: Samuel Phillips Jr.

House
- Speaker: Edward Robbins

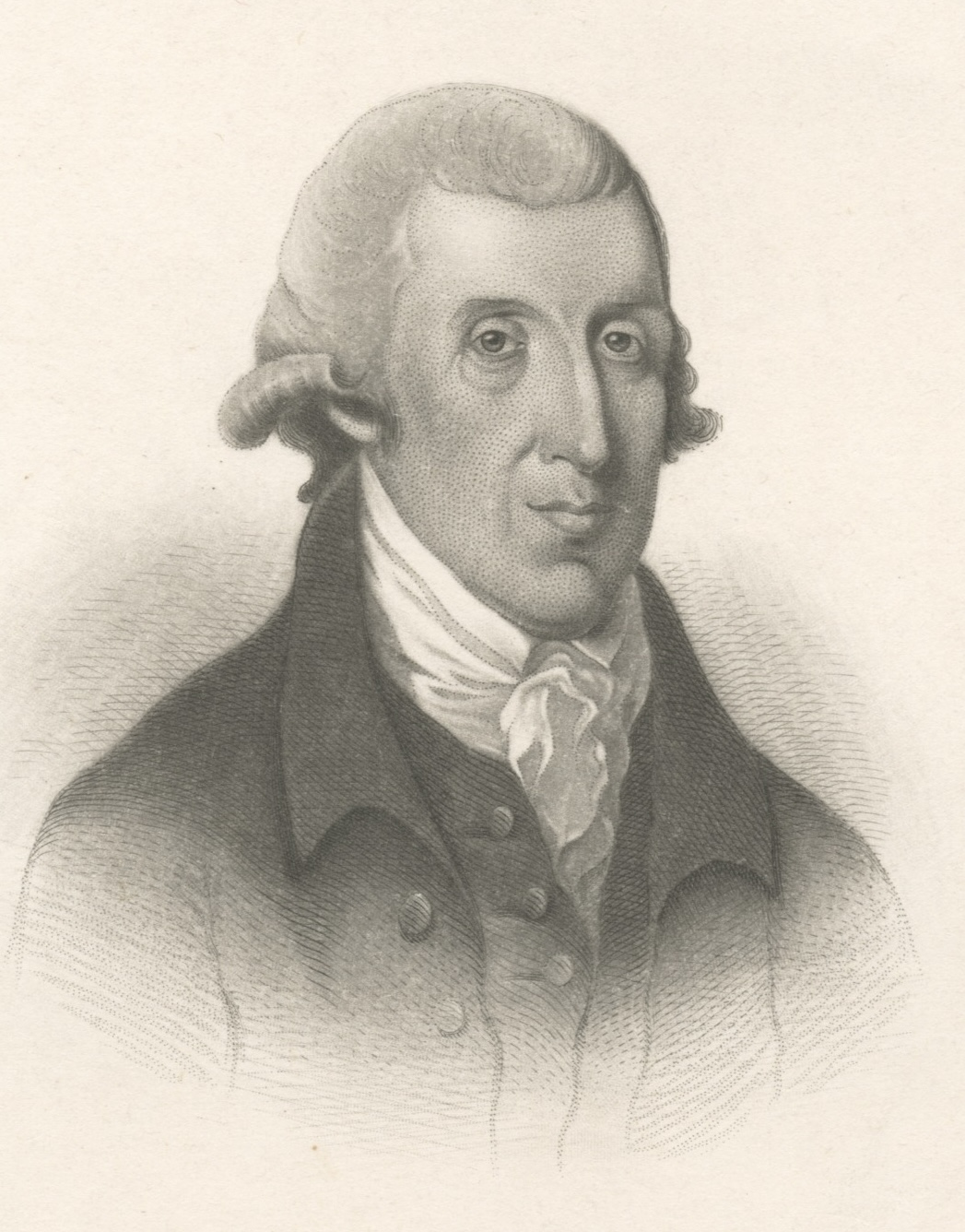
Samuel Phillips, Senate president.

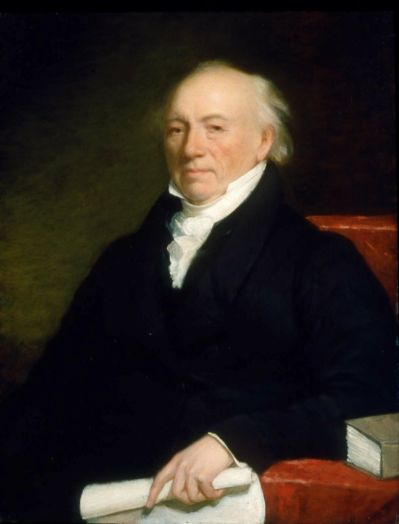
Edward Robbins, House speaker.

Leaders of the Massachusetts General Court, 1796-1797.

The 17th Massachusetts General Court, consisting of the Massachusetts Senate and the Massachusetts House of Representatives, met in 1796 and 1797 during the governorship of Samuel Adams. Samuel Phillips Jr. served as president of the Senate and Edward Robbins served as speaker of the House.

== Senators ==
image	name	date of birth	District	Party
	Oliver Wendell		Suffolk	
	Thomas Dawes		Suffolk	
	Benjamin Austin, jun.		Suffolk	
	William Eustis	June 10, 1753	Suffolk	Democratic-Republican
	Samuel Holton		Essex	
	Azor Orne	July 22, 1731	Essex	
	Samuel Phillips		Essex	
	Stephen Choate		Essex	
Nathan_Dane,_1752-1835._Oil_copy_by_Mrs._David_from_original_in_Dane_Hall_at_Harvard_College_(page_118_crop)	Nathan Dane	December 29, 1752	Essex	
	Eleazer Brooks		Middlesex	
	Ebenezer Bridge		Middlesex	
	Laommi Baldwin		Middlesex	
	Daniel Whitney		Middlesex	
Gilbert_Stuart_Portrait_of_William_Shepard	William Shepard	December 1, 1737	Hampshire	
	John Hastings		Hampshire	
	David Sexton		Hampshire	
Mary_Mattoon_and_her_hero_of_the_revolution_(General_Ebenezer_Mattoon)_(1902)_(14595947117)	Ebenezer Mattoon	August 19, 1755	Hampshire	Federalist
Thomas_Dwight,_head-and-shoulders_portrait,_right_profile_LCCN2007675934	Thomas Dwight	October 29, 1758	Hampshire	
	Nathaniel Wells		York	
	Simon Frye		York	
	Isaac Thompson		Plymouth	
	Beza Hayward		Plymouth	
	Elisha May		Bristol	
	Candidates		Bristol	
	Solomon Freeman		Barnstable	
	Peleg Coffin Jr.	November 3, 1756	Dukes and Nantucket	
	Jonathan Warner		Worcester	
	Josiah Stearns		Worcester	
	Daniel Bigelow, Salem Town		Worcester	
	Candidates		Worcester	
	Stephen Longfellow		Cumberland	
	Candidates		Cumberland	
	Alexander Campbell		Lincoln, Washington and Hancock	
	Candidates		Lincoln, Washington and Hancock	
Thomson Joseph Skinner_(Massachusetts Congressman)	Thompson J. Skinner	May 24, 1752	Berkshire	Federalist
	John Bacon	April 5, 1738	Berkshire	
	John Read		Norfolk	
	Ebenezer Thayer	August 21, 1746	Norfolk	
	Seth Bullard		Norfolk	
	Oliver Woolcott, Esq.			

== Representatives ==
image	name	date of birth	County	Town	Party
Jonathan_Mason, Senator from Massachusetts, by American school of the 19th century	Jonathan Mason (politician)	September 12, 1756	Suffolk	Boston	Federalist
	William Eustis		Suffolk	Boston	
	William Little		Suffolk	Boston	
	Joseph Russel, Esq.		Suffolk	Boston	
	John Codman		Suffolk	Boston	
Harrison Gray Otis (Painting)	Harrison Gray Otis (politician)	October 8, 1765	Suffolk	Boston	Federalist
	Samuel Cooper		Suffolk	Boston	
	Samuel Norton		Suffolk	Hingham	
	John Norris		Essex	Salem	
	John Treadwell		Essex	Salem	
	Elias H. Darby, jun.		Essex	Salem	
	Gideon Foster		Essex	Danvers	
	Nathan Wade		Essex	Ipswich	
	Josiah Little		Essex	Newbury	
	Enoch Titcomb, Jun.		Essex	Newburyport	
	Samuel Sewall	December 11, 1757	Essex	Marblehead	Federalist
	Capt. James Robinson		Essex	Lynn and Lynnfield	
	Joshua Holt		Essex	Andover	
	Joseph Wood		Essex	Beverly	
	Asa Nelson		Essex	Rowley	
	Joshua Follansbe		Essex	Salisbury	
	Nathaniel Marsh		Essex	Haverhill	
	John Low		Essex	Gloucester	
	John Rowe		Essex	Gloucester	
	Salvenus Willes		Essex	Topsfield	
	Daniel Currier, Jun.		Essex	Amesbury	
	Peter Russell		Essex	Bradford	
	William Ross		Essex	Methuen	
	Thomas Parley		Essex	Boxford	
	Aaron Hill		Middlesex	Cambridge	
	Amos Bond		Middlesex	Watertown	
	Richard Devens		Middlesex	Charlestown	
	John Walker		Middlesex	Woburn	
	Jonathan Fay		Middlesex	Concord	
	Jonathan Ward		Middlesex	Newton	
	Henry Putnam		Middlesex	Reading	
	Edward Barnes		Middlesex	Malborough	
	Jonathan Bowers		Middlesex	Billerica	
	Jonathan Maynard		Middlesex	Framingham	
	Joseph Simonds		Middlesex	Lexington	
	John Minor		Middlesex	Chelmsford	
	Daniel Whitney		Middlesex	Sherburne	
	Edward Wade		Middlesex	Malden	
	Artemas Ward		Middlesex	Weston	
	Ebenezer Hall		Middlesex	Medford	
	Gilbert Dench		Middlesex	Hopkinton	
	Abel Boynton		Middlesex	Westford	
	Abner Saunderson		Middlesex	Waltham	
	Charles Whitman		Middlesex	Stow and Boxbury	
Timothy_Bigelow,_Jr._(1767)	Timothy Bigelow		Middlesex	Groton	
	John Heald		Middlesex	Pepperell	
	Daniel Adams		Middlesex	Townsend	
	James Mellen		Middlesex	Groton	
	Jonas Brooks		Middlesex	Acton and Carlisle	
	Joseph Woodward		Middlesex	Tewksbury	
	Thomas Heard		Middlesex	East Sudbury	
	Moses Bliss		Hampshire	Springfield	
	Thomas Dwight	October 29, 1758	Hampshire	Springfield	Federalist
	Justin Ely		Hampshire	West Springfield	
	Jonathan Smith, jun.		Hampshire	West Springfield	
	John Bliss		Hampshire	Wilbraham	
	Samuel Henshaw		Hampshire	North and East Hampton	
	Levi Shepard		Hampshire	Springfield	
	Zebina Montague		Hampshire	Amherst	
	Elijah Kent		Hampshire	Granby	
	William Bodman		Hampshire	Williamsburg	
	Seth Catlin		Hampshire	Deerfield	
	Joseph Hoar		Hampshire	Brimfield	
	Varney Pearce		Hampshire	New Salem	
	Abel Goodell		Hampshire	Monson	
	Charles Phelps		Hampshire	Hadley	
	David King		Hampshire	Palmer	
	Caleb Kinsley		Hampshire	Montague	
	Park Holland		Hampshire	Belchertown	
	Hugh M'Clallen		Hampshire	Colrain	
	David Fowler, jun.		Hampshire	Southwick	
	David Robinson		Hampshire	Granville	
	Enoch Bancraft		Hampshire	Granville	
	Lemuel Pomeroy		Hampshire	Southampton	
	Nathaniel Cheney		Hampshire	Warwick and Orange	
	Jed Smith		Hampshire	Blandford	
	John Powers		Hampshire	Shutesbury	
	Sylvester Judd		Hampshire	West Hampton	
	William Ward		Hampshire	Cummington and Plainfield	
	William Coleman		Hampshire	Greenfield and Gill	
	Edmund Longley		Hampshire	Hawley	
	Nathaniel Goodwin		Plymouth	Plymouth	
	Elijah Turner		Plymouth	Scituate	
	Judah Alden		Plymouth	Duxbury	
	Elisha Phillips		Plymouth	Marshfield	
	Daniel Snow		Plymouth	Bridgewater	
	Nathaniel Wilder		Plymouth	Middleboro	
	Ebenezer Washburn		Plymouth	Kingston	
	Aaron Hubbard		Plymouth	Abington	
	Benjamin Bass		Plymouth	Hanover	
	Ebenezer Crocker		Barnstable	Barnstable	
	Simeon Kingman		Barnstable	Eastham	
	Richard Sears		Barnstable	Chatham	
	Apollo Leonard		Bristol	Taunton	
	Stephen Bullock	October 10, 1735	Bristol	Rehoboth	Federalist
	Christopher Mason		Bristol	Swansea	
	Seth Smith, jun		Bristol	Norton	
	Rufus Whitmarsh		Bristol	Dighton	
	Ephraim Winslow		Bristol	Freetown	
	Joseph Dean		Bristol	Raynham	
	Seth Spooner		Bristol	New Bedford	
	John Bowers		Bristol	Somerset	
	Esaias Preble		York	York	
	Mark Adams		York	Kittery	
	Jacob Wilds		York	Arundel	
	Thomas G. Thornton		York	Pepperrelboro	
	Simon Frye		York	Fryeburgh	
	Micajah Coffin	August 18, 1734	Nantucket	Nantucket	
	Samuel Flagg		Worcester	Worcester	
	Levi Lincoln		Worcester	Worcester	
	John Sprague		Worcester	Lancaster	
	Benjamin Read		Worcester	Mendon	
	Thomas Hall, jun.		Worcester	Brookfield	
	Ebenezer Davis		Worcester	Charlton	
	Samuel Waters		Worcester	Sutton	
	William Henshaw		Worcester	Leicester	
	Benjamin Drury		Worcester	Spencer	
	Jonas How		Worcester	Rutland	
	Silas Hall		Worcester	New Braintree	
	Nathan Fisher		Worcester	Westboro	
	Isaac Davin		Worcester	Northboro	
	Josiah Stearns		Worcester	Lunenburg	
	Bazaleal Taft		Worcester	Uxbridge	
	Silas Holman		Worcester	Bolton and Berlin	
	Josiah Walker		Worcester	Sturbridge	
	Martin Kinsley	June 2, 1754	Worcester	Hardwick	Democratic-Republican
	Thomas Gowing		Worcester	Leominster	
	John Dodds		Worcester	Holden	
	Aaron Marsh		Worcester	Douglas	
	Daniel Bigelow		Worcester	Petersham	
	Ebenezer Jones		Worcester	Westminster	
	Samuel Wilder		Worcester	Ashburnham	
	Samuel Prensiss		Worcester	Winchendon	
	John Chamberlain		Worcester	Dudley	
	Jack Black		Worcester	Barre	
	Samuel Jones		Worcester	Milford	
	Edward Raymond		Worcester	Sterling	
	Jonas Temple		Worcester	Boylston	
	Archelaus Lewis		Cumberland	Falmouth	
	Daniel Davis		Cumberland	Portland	
	Daniel Tucker		Cumberland	Portland	
	John Minott		Cumberland	Brunswick	
	William McCobb		Lincoln	Boothbay	
	Amos Stoddard	October 26, 1762	Lincoln	Hollowell	
	John Hubbard		Lincoln	Winthrop and Readfield	
	Thomas Thurston		Lincoln	Warren	
	Samuel Brown		Lincoln	Thomastown	
	Francis Winter		Lincoln	Bath	
	Ebenezer Smith		Berkshire	New Marlboro	
	Giedon Wheeler		Berkshire	Lanesborough and New Ashford	
	John C. Williams		Berkshire	Pittsfield	
	Azaraiah Egleston	25 Feb 1757	Berkshire	Lenox	
	Ephraim Williams		Berkshire	Stockbridge	
	John Canfield		Berkshire	Sandisfield	
	Hugh Burghart		Berkshire	Richmond	
	Israel Jones		Berkshire	Adams	
	Josiah Hale		Berkshire	Lee	
	Phinehas Bruce		Washington	Machias	
	Ebenezer Seaver	July 5, 1763	Norfolk	Roxbury	Democratic-Republican
	John How		Norfolk	Dorchester	
	James Swans		Norfolk	Dorchester	
	Edward L. Robbins	February 9, 1758	Norfolk	Milton	Democratic-Republican
	Ebenezer Thayer	August 21, 1746	Norfolk	Braintree	
	Nathaniel Bayley		Norfolk	Weymouth	
	Isaac Bullard		Norfolk	Dedham	
	William Aspinwall	May 23, 1743	Norfolk	Brooklyn	
	John Baxter		Norfolk	Medfield and Dover	
	Frederick Pope		Norfolk	Stoughton	
	Joseph Hewins		Norfolk	Sharon	
	Eliakim Adams		Norfolk	Medway	
	Seth Bullard		Norfolk	Walpole	
	Silas Alden		Norfolk	Needham	
	Thomas Lathrop		Norfolk	Cohasset	

== See also ==
- List of Massachusetts General Courts
