= Senator Barstow =

Senator Barstow may refer to:

- Gamaliel H. Barstow (1784–1865), New York State Senate
- Gideon Barstow (1783–1852), Massachusetts State Senate
- John L. Barstow (1832–1913), Vermont State Senate
