= 1851 Massachusetts legislature =

American state legislature

72nd Massachusetts General Court
←	71st	73rd	→

Overview
- Legislative body: General Court

Senate
- Members: 40
- President: Henry Wilson

House
- Members: 396
- Speaker: Nathaniel Prentice Banks

Sessions
- 1st: January 2, 1851 – May 24, 1851

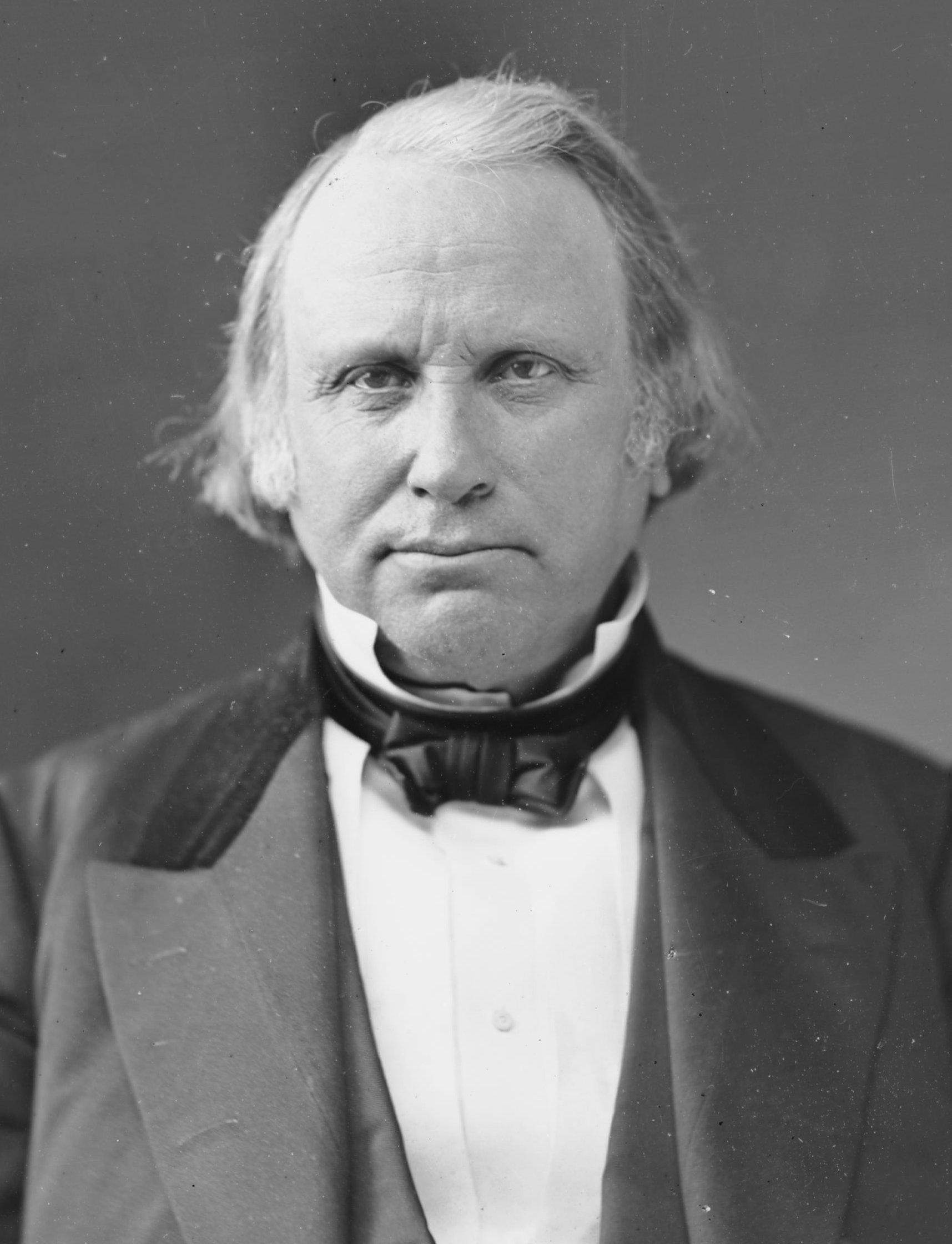
Henry Wilson, Senate president.

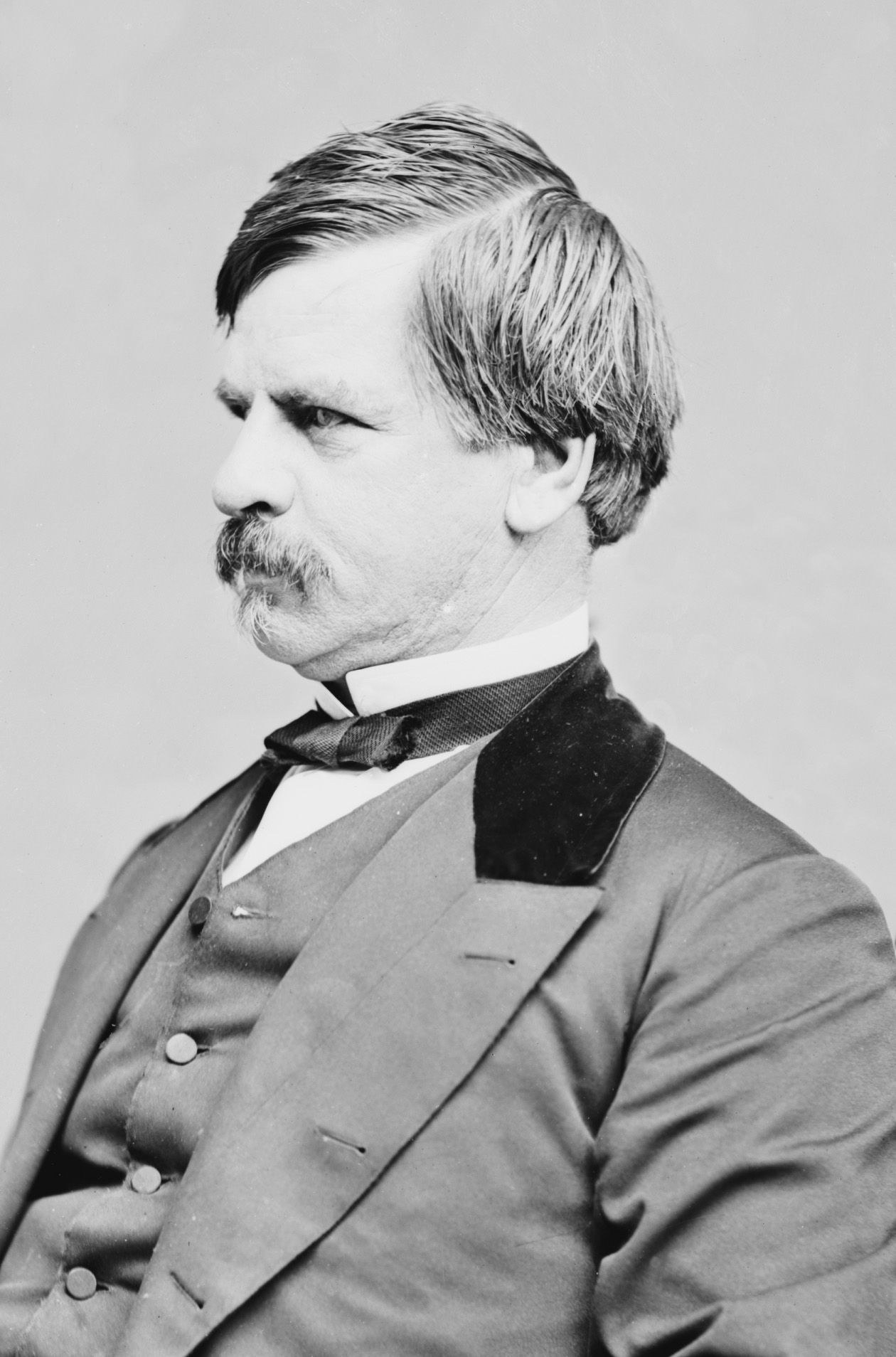
Nathaniel Banks, House speaker.

Leaders of the Massachusetts General Court, 1851.

The 72nd Massachusetts General Court, consisting of the Massachusetts Senate and the Massachusetts House of Representatives, met in 1851 during the governorship of George S. Boutwell. Henry Wilson served as president of the Senate and Nathaniel Prentice Banks served as speaker of the House.

== Senators ==
- George Austin
- William Barney
- Z. D. Bassett
- Erasmus D. Beach
- Edw. B. Bigelow
- John Boynton
- Richard P. Brown
- Jos. T. Buckingham
- Edward Cazneau
- Robert S. Daniells
- Alex. De Witt
- Lyman W. Dean
- John Earle
- John W. Graves
- Whiting Griswold
- Wm. A. Hawley
- Stephen Hilliard
- Francis Howe
- Charles Hubbard
- William Hyde
- Edw. L. Keyes
- Edmund Kimball
- Geo. H Kuhn
- Alvah Morrison
- David Moseley
- Moses Newell
- Frederic Robinson
- Charles T. Russell
- Daniel Saunders, Jr.
- David Sears
- Benjamin Seaver
- J. M. Usher
- Samuel Warner, Jr.
- Asa G. Welch
- Luke Wellington
- Giles H. Whitney
- John H. Wilkins
- Henry Wilson
- Moses Wood
- Wm. H. Wood

== See also ==
- 32nd United States Congress
- List of Massachusetts General Courts
