= 1823–1824 Massachusetts legislature =

American state legislature

44th Massachusetts General Court
←	43rd	45th	→

Overview
- Legislative body: General Court
- Term: May 1823 – May 1824

Senate
- Members: 40
- President: Nathaniel Silsbee

House
- Speaker: William C. Jarvis

Sessions
- 1st: May 28, 1823 – June 14, 1823
- 2nd: January 7, 1824 – February 21, 1824

The 44th Massachusetts General Court, consisting of the Massachusetts Senate and the Massachusetts House of Representatives, met in 1823 and 1824 during the governorship of William Eustis. Nathaniel Silsbee served as president of the Senate and William C. Jarvis served as speaker of the House.

== Senators ==
- Benjamin Adams
- Jonathan Allen
- William Austin
- Peter C. Brooks
- Joel Cranston
- Nathaniel P. Denny
- Braddock Dimmick
- Josiah J. Fiske
- James Fowler
- Stephen P. Gardner
- Benjamin Gorham
- James L. Hodges
- Elihu Hoyt
- Samuel Hubbard
- George Hull
- Nathaniel Jones
- John Keyes
- Sherman Leland
- Thomas Longley
- Aaron Lummus
- John Mason
- John Mills
- Jethro Mitchell
- Nathan Noyes
- William W. Parrott
- Thomas H. Perkins
- John Prince
- Joseph Richardson
- John Ruggles
- Nathaniel Silsbee
- Seth Sprague
- Oliver Starkweather
- Lewis Strong
- Joseph Strong, Jr.
- George Sullivan
- Levi Thaxter
- Aaron Tufts
- John Wade
- Moses Wingate
- Thomas L. Winthrop

== Representatives ==
- William Phillips

== See also ==
- 18th United States Congress
- List of Massachusetts General Courts
