= Marshall Pinckney Wilder =

Marshall Pinckney Wilder may refer to:

- Marshall Pinckney Wilder (actor)
- Marshall Pinckney Wilder (politician)
