= Senator Wilder =

Senator Wilder may refer to:

- John Shelton Wilder (1921–2010), Tennessee State Senate
- Marshall Pinckney Wilder (politician) (1798–1886), Massachusetts State Senate
