= 1852 Massachusetts legislature =

American state legislature

73rd Massachusetts General Court
←	72nd	74th	→

Overview
- Legislative body: General Court

Senate
- Members: 40
- President: Henry Wilson

House
- Members: 402
- Speaker: Nathaniel Prentice Banks

Sessions
- 1st: January 7, 1852 – May 22, 1852

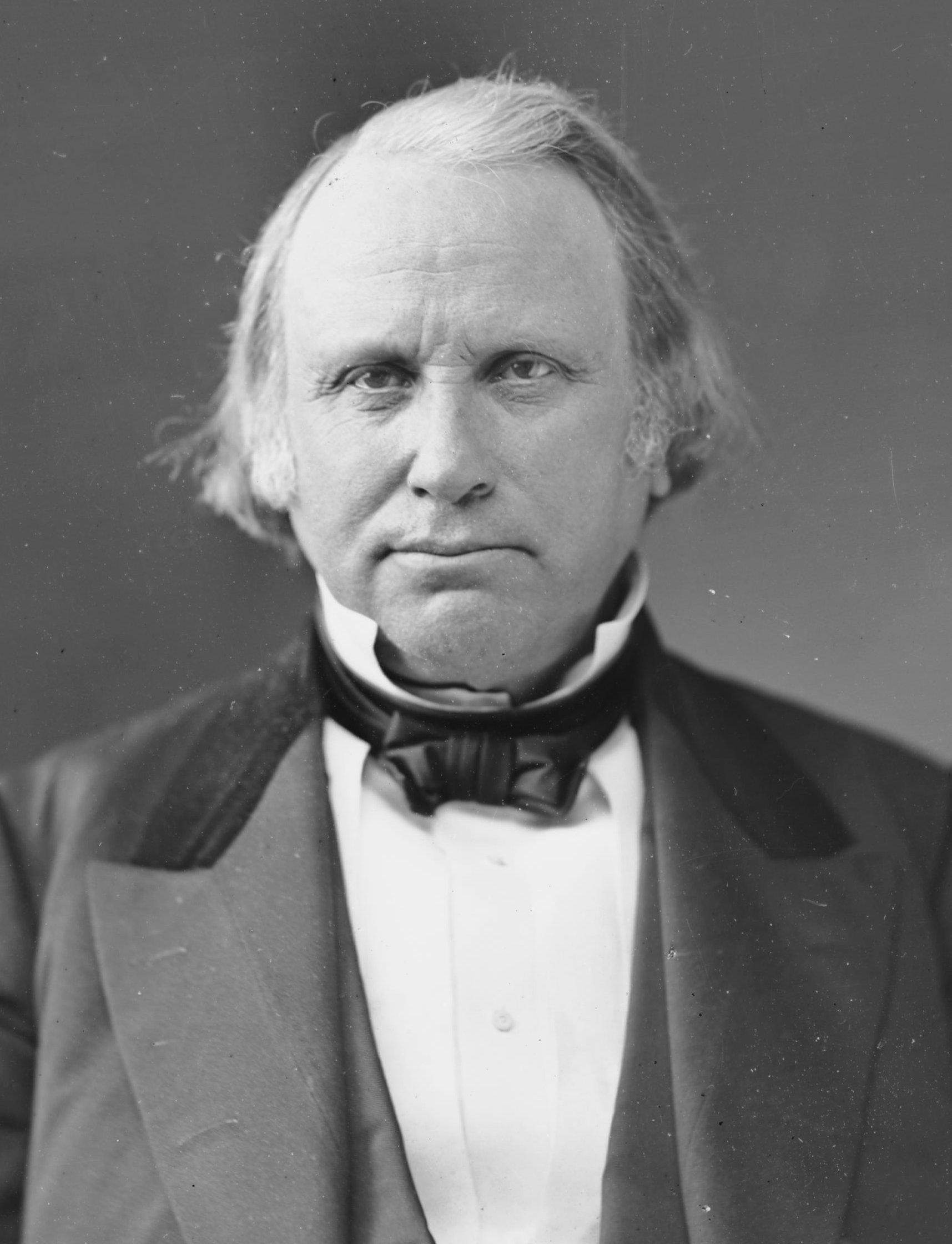
Henry Wilson, Senate president.

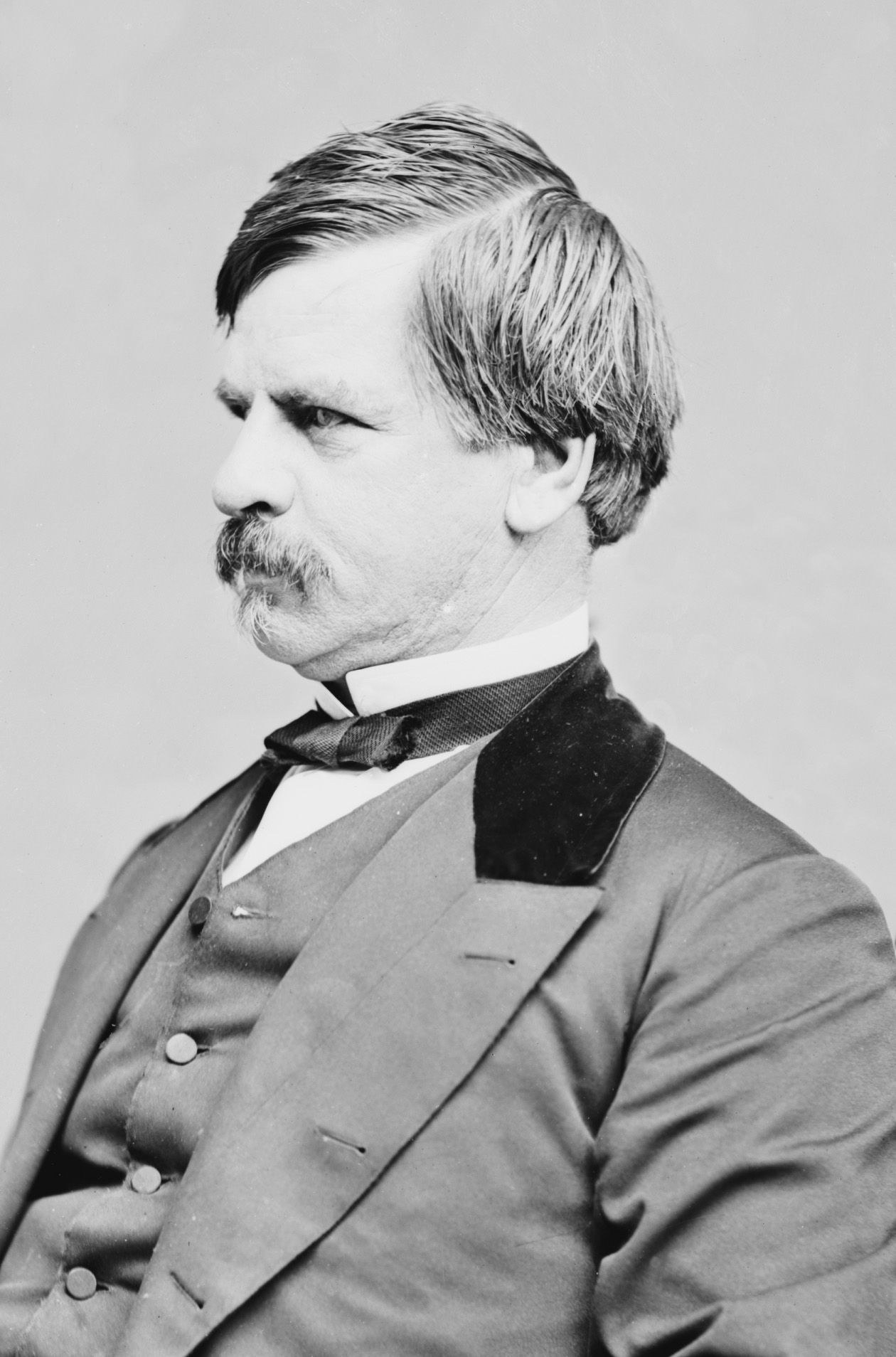
Nathaniel Banks, House speaker.

Leaders of the Massachusetts General Court, 1852.

The 73rd Massachusetts General Court, consisting of the Massachusetts Senate and the Massachusetts House of Representatives, met in 1852 during the governorship of George S. Boutwell. Henry Wilson served as president of the Senate and Nathaniel Prentice Banks served as speaker of the House.

== Senators ==
- George Austin
- William Barney
- Zenas D. Bassett
- Erasmus D. Beach
- Edw. B. Bigelow
- John Boynton
- Richard P. Brown
- Jos. T. Buckingham
- Edward Cazneau
- Robert S. Daniels
- Alex. De Witt
- Lyman W. Dean
- John Earle
- John W. Graves
- Whiting Griswold
- Wm. A. Hawley
- Francis Howe
- Charles Hubbard
- William Hyde
- Edw. L. Keyes
- Edmund Kimball
- Chauncey L. Knapp
- Geo. H. Kuhn
- Stephen Milliard
- Alvah Morrison
- David Mosely
- Moses Newell
- Frederick Robinson
- Charles T. Russell
- Daniel Saunders, Jr.
- David Sears
- Benjamin Seaver
- William C. Taber
- Albert Thorndike
- James M. Usher
- Samuel Warner, Jr.
- Cyrus Washburn
- Asa G. Welch
- Luke Wellington
- Giles H. Whitney
- John H. Wilkins
- Henry Wilson
- Wm. H. Wood
- Moses Wood

== See also ==
- 32nd United States Congress
- List of Massachusetts General Courts
