= 1850 Massachusetts legislature =

American state legislature

71st Massachusetts General Court
←	70th	72nd	→

Overview
- Legislative body: General Court

Senate
- Members: 40
- President: Marshall Pinckney Wilder

House
- Members: 297
- Speaker: Ensign H. Kellogg

Sessions
- 1st: January 2, 1850 – May 3, 1850

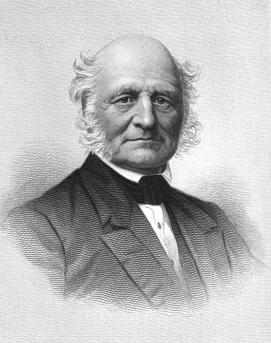
Marshall Wilder, Senate president.

Ensign Kellogg, House speaker.

Leaders of the Massachusetts General Court, 1850.

The 71st Massachusetts General Court, consisting of the Massachusetts Senate and the Massachusetts House of Representatives, met in 1850 during the governorship of George N. Briggs. Marshall Pinckney Wilder served as president of the Senate and Ensign H. Kellogg served as speaker of the House.

== Senators ==
- Daniel C. Baker
- C. Bardwell
- Nathan Benjamin
- E. B. Bigelow
- Joseph S. Borland
- J. T. Buckingham
- Ed. Cazneau
- Charles Choate
- James Cooley
- Geo. W. Crockett
- John Daggett
- Henry L. Dawes
- Alex. DeWitt
- John W. Graves
- Lewis Harding
- William A. Hawley
- N. W. Hazen
- Geo. S. Hillard
- Stephen Hilliard
- A. Hutchinson
- John Jenkins
- Aaron King
- Cyrus Kingman
- Pliny Merrick
- Moses Newell
- Jonathan Preston
- John Raymond
- Lysander Richards
- Benjamin Seaver
- Wm. C. Starbuck
- C. Thompson
- A. Thorndike
- William Tucker
- Chas. W. Upham
- Amasa Walker
- Wm. B. Washburn
- Edwin Whitney
- M. P. Wilder
- Marshall P. Wilder
- John H. Wilkins
- William H. Wood

== Representatives ==
- James A. Abbott

== See also ==
- 31st United States Congress
- List of Massachusetts General Courts
