= List of Massachusetts General Courts =

List of Massachusetts state legislatures

The legislature of the U.S. state of Massachusetts is known as the General Court. It has a 40-member upper house (Massachusetts Senate) and a 160-member lower house (Massachusetts House of Representatives). Descended from the colonial legislature, the first Massachusetts General Court met in October 1780 and consisted of one-year elected terms for both houses. This was expanded to two-year terms starting with the 142nd General Court in January 1921.

== Legislatures ==
=== 1780–1899 ===
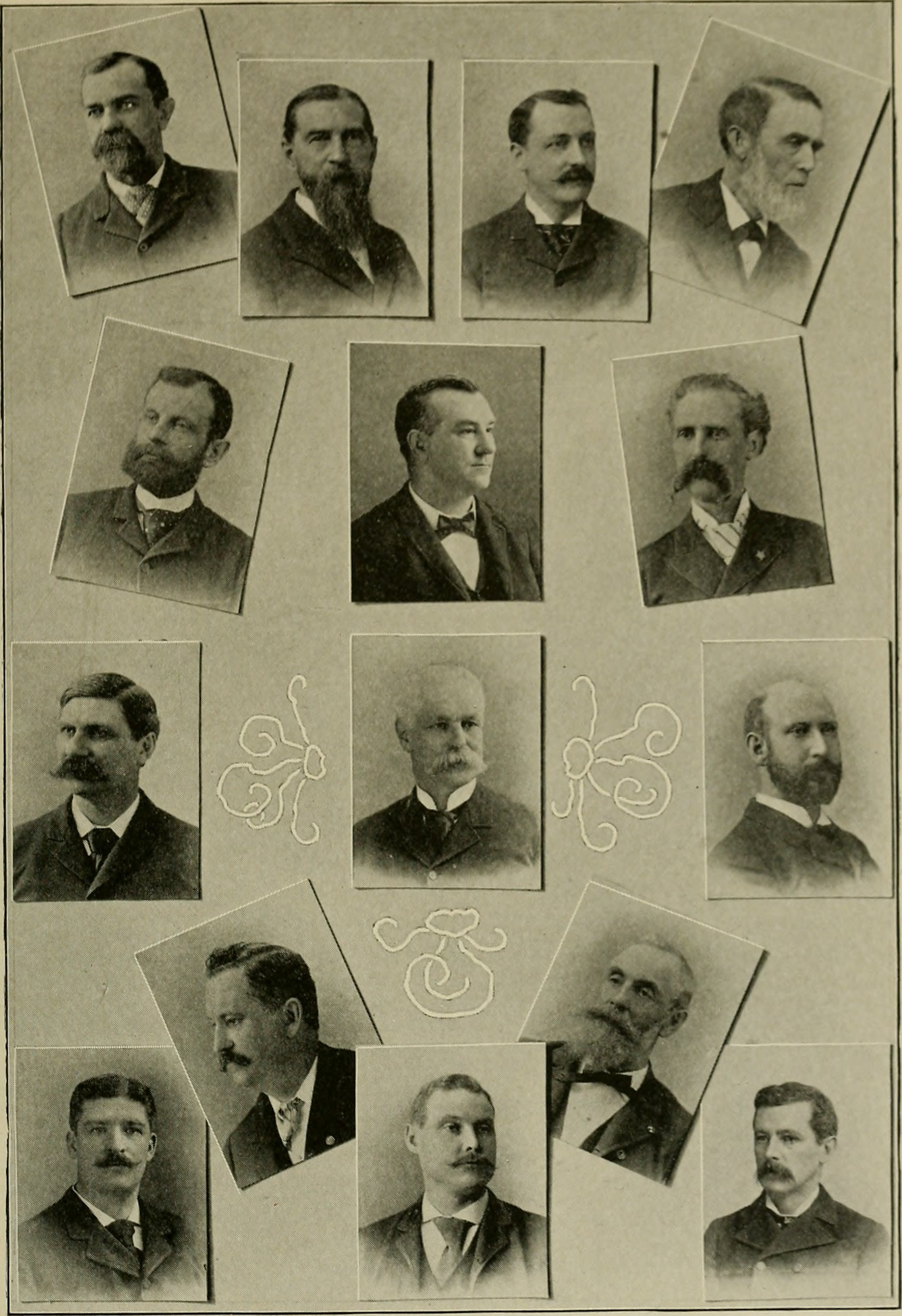
Members of the Committee on Railroads, 1892

- 1st Massachusetts General Court (1780–1781)
- 2nd Massachusetts General Court (1781–1782)
- 3rd Massachusetts General Court (1782–1783)
- 4th Massachusetts General Court (1783–1784)
- 5th Massachusetts General Court (1784–1785)
- 6th Massachusetts General Court (1785–1786)
- 7th Massachusetts General Court (1786–1787)
- 8th Massachusetts General Court (1787–1788)
- 9th Massachusetts General Court (1788–1789)
- 10th Massachusetts General Court (1789–1790)
- 11th Massachusetts General Court (1790–1791)
- 12th Massachusetts General Court (1791–1792)
- 13th Massachusetts General Court (1792–1793)
- 14th Massachusetts General Court (1793–1794)
- 15th Massachusetts General Court (1794–1795)
- 16th Massachusetts General Court (1795–1796)
- 17th Massachusetts General Court (1796–1797)
- 18th Massachusetts General Court (1797–1798)
- 19th Massachusetts General Court (1798–1799)
- 20th Massachusetts General Court (1799–1800)
- 21st Massachusetts General Court (1800–1801)
- 22nd Massachusetts General Court (1801–1802)
- 23rd Massachusetts General Court (1802–1803)
- 24th Massachusetts General Court (1803–1804)
- 25th Massachusetts General Court (1804–1805)
- 26th Massachusetts General Court (1805–1806)
- 27th Massachusetts General Court (1806–1807)
- 28th Massachusetts General Court (1807–1808)
- 29th Massachusetts General Court (1808–1809)
- 30th Massachusetts General Court (1809–1810)
- 31st Massachusetts General Court (1810–1811)
- 32nd Massachusetts General Court (1811–1812)
- 33rd Massachusetts General Court (1812–1813)
- 34th Massachusetts General Court (1813–1814)
- 35th Massachusetts General Court (1814–1815)
- 36th Massachusetts General Court (1815–1816)
- 37th Massachusetts General Court (1816–1817)
- 38th Massachusetts General Court (1817–1818)
- 39th Massachusetts General Court (1818–1819)
- 40th Massachusetts General Court (1819–1820)
- 41st Massachusetts General Court (1820–1821)
- 42nd Massachusetts General Court (1821–1822)
- 43rd Massachusetts General Court (1822–1823)
- 44th Massachusetts General Court (1823–1824)
- 45th Massachusetts General Court (1824–1825)
- 46th Massachusetts General Court (1825–1826)
- 47th Massachusetts General Court (1826–1827)
- 48th Massachusetts General Court (1827–1828)
- 49th Massachusetts General Court (1828–1829)
- 50th Massachusetts General Court (1829–1830)
- 51st Massachusetts General Court (1830–1831)
- 52nd Massachusetts General Court (1831)
- 53rd Massachusetts General Court (1832)
- 54th Massachusetts General Court (1833)
- 55th Massachusetts General Court (1834)
- 56th Massachusetts General Court (1835)
- 57th Massachusetts General Court (1836)
- 58th Massachusetts General Court (1837)
- 59th Massachusetts General Court (1838)
- 60th Massachusetts General Court (1839)
- 61st Massachusetts General Court (1840)
- 62nd Massachusetts General Court (1841)
- 63rd Massachusetts General Court (1842)
- 64th Massachusetts General Court (1843)
- 65th Massachusetts General Court (1844)
- 66th Massachusetts General Court (1845)
- 67th Massachusetts General Court (1846)
- 68th Massachusetts General Court (1847)
- 69th Massachusetts General Court (1848)
- 70th Massachusetts General Court (1849)
- 71st Massachusetts General Court (1850)
- 72nd Massachusetts General Court (1851)
- 73rd Massachusetts General Court (1852)
- 74th Massachusetts General Court (1853)
- 75th Massachusetts General Court (1854)
- 76th Massachusetts General Court (1855)
- 77th Massachusetts General Court (1856)
- 78th Massachusetts General Court (1857)
- 79th Massachusetts General Court (1858)
- 80th Massachusetts General Court (1859)
- 81st Massachusetts General Court (1860)
- 82nd Massachusetts General Court (1861)
- 83rd Massachusetts General Court (1862)
- 84th Massachusetts General Court (1863)
- 85th Massachusetts General Court (1864)
- 86th Massachusetts General Court (1865)
- 87th Massachusetts General Court (1866)
- 88th Massachusetts General Court (1867)
- 89th Massachusetts General Court (1868)
- 90th Massachusetts General Court (1869)
- 91st Massachusetts General Court (1870)
- 92nd Massachusetts General Court (1871)
- 93rd Massachusetts General Court (1872)
- 94th Massachusetts General Court (1873)
- 95th Massachusetts General Court (1874)
- 96th Massachusetts General Court (1875)
- 97th Massachusetts General Court (1876)
- 98th Massachusetts General Court (1877)
- 99th Massachusetts General Court (1878)
- 100th Massachusetts General Court (1879)
- 101st Massachusetts General Court (1880)
- 102nd Massachusetts General Court (1881)
- 103rd Massachusetts General Court (1882)
- 104th Massachusetts General Court (1883)
- 105th Massachusetts General Court (1884)
- 106th Massachusetts General Court (1885)
- 107th Massachusetts General Court (1886)
- 108th Massachusetts General Court (1887)
- 109th Massachusetts General Court (1888)
- 110th Massachusetts General Court (1889)
- 111th Massachusetts General Court (1890)
- 112th Massachusetts General Court (1891)
- 113th Massachusetts General Court (1892)
- 114th Massachusetts General Court (1893)
- 115th Massachusetts General Court (1894)
- 116th Massachusetts General Court (1895)
- 117th Massachusetts General Court (1896)
- 118th Massachusetts General Court (1897)
- 119th Massachusetts General Court (1898)
- 120th Massachusetts General Court (1899)

=== 1900–2000 ===
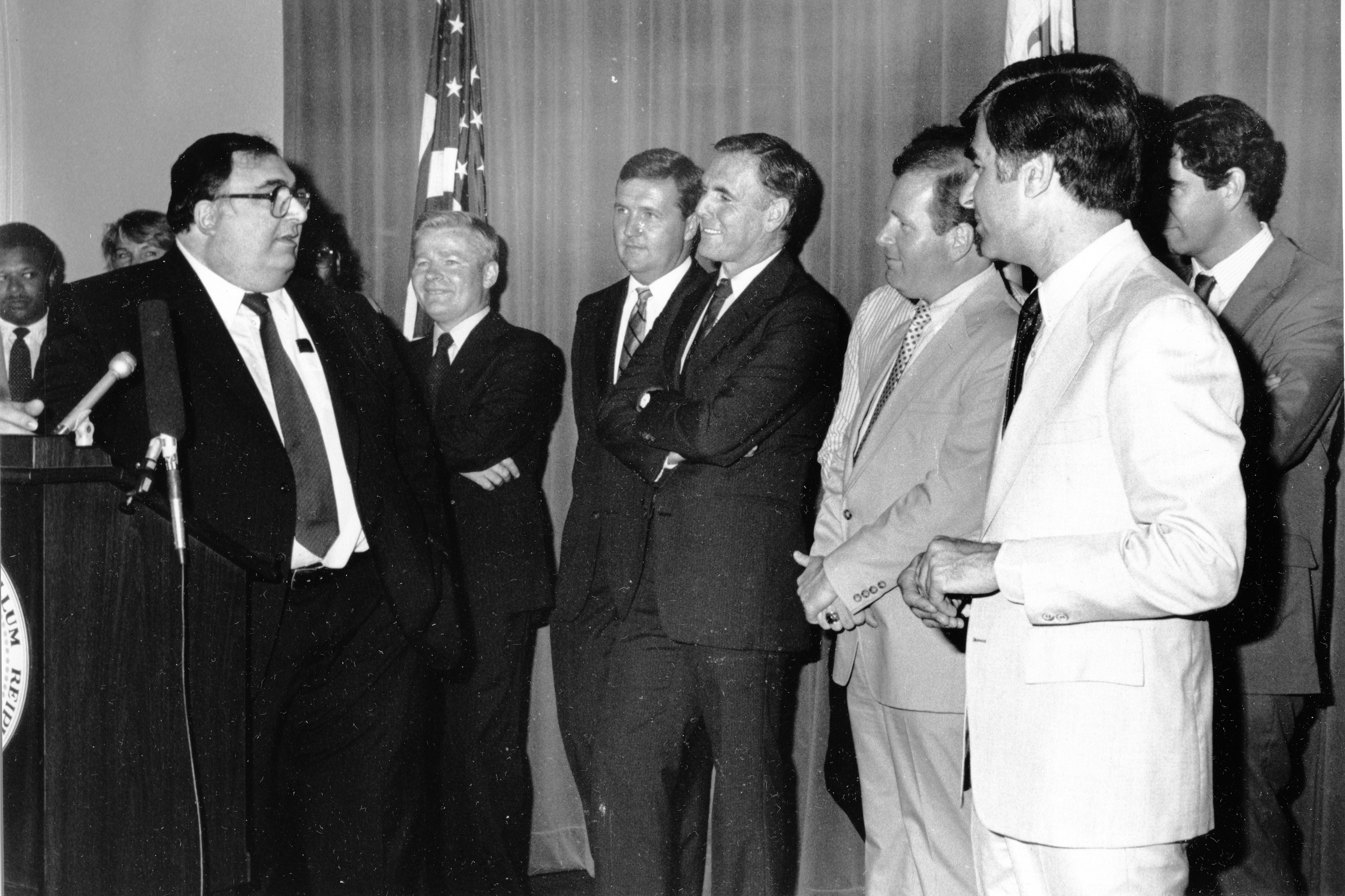
Massachusetts politicians in the mid-1980s: house speaker George Keverian at podium. Back row: senate president William M. Bulger, state representative John McDonough, mayor Raymond L. Flynn, two unidentified men, state representative William Galvin, governor Michael S. Dukakis

- 121st Massachusetts General Court (1900)
- 122nd Massachusetts General Court (1901)
- 123rd Massachusetts General Court (1902)
- 124th Massachusetts General Court (1903)
- 125th Massachusetts General Court (1904)
- 126th Massachusetts General Court (1905)
- 127th Massachusetts General Court (1906)
- 128th Massachusetts General Court (1907)
- 129th Massachusetts General Court (1908)
- 130th Massachusetts General Court (1909)
- 131st Massachusetts General Court (1910)
- 132nd Massachusetts General Court (1911)
- 133rd Massachusetts General Court (1912)
- 134th Massachusetts General Court (1913)
- 135th Massachusetts General Court (1914)
- 136th Massachusetts General Court (1915)
- 137th Massachusetts General Court (1916)
- 138th Massachusetts General Court (1917)
- 139th Massachusetts General Court (1918)
- 140th Massachusetts General Court (1919)
- 141st Massachusetts General Court (1920)
- 142nd Massachusetts General Court (1921–1922)
- 143rd Massachusetts General Court (1923–1924)
- 144th Massachusetts General Court (1925–1926)
- 145th Massachusetts General Court (1927–1928)
- 146th Massachusetts General Court (1929–1930)
- 147th Massachusetts General Court (1931–1932)
- 148th Massachusetts General Court (1933–1934)
- 149th Massachusetts General Court (1935–1936)
- 150th Massachusetts General Court (1937–1938)
- 151st Massachusetts General Court (1939)
- 152nd Massachusetts General Court (1941–1942)
- 153rd Massachusetts General Court (1943–1944)
- 154th Massachusetts General Court (1945–1946)
- 155th Massachusetts General Court (1947–1948)
- 156th Massachusetts General Court (1949–1950)
- 157th Massachusetts General Court (1951–1952)
- 158th Massachusetts General Court (1953–1954)
- 159th Massachusetts General Court (1955–1956)
- 160th Massachusetts General Court (1957–1958)
- 161st Massachusetts General Court (1959–1960)
- 162nd Massachusetts General Court (1961–1962)
- 163rd Massachusetts General Court (1963–1964)
- 164th Massachusetts General Court (1965–1966)
- 165th Massachusetts General Court (1967–1968)
- 166th Massachusetts General Court (1969–1970)
- 167th Massachusetts General Court (1971–1972)
- 168th Massachusetts General Court (1973–1974)
- 169th Massachusetts General Court (1975–1976)
- 170th Massachusetts General Court (1977–1978)
- 171st Massachusetts General Court (1979–1980)
- 172nd Massachusetts General Court (1981–1982)
- 173rd Massachusetts General Court (1983–1984)
- 174th Massachusetts General Court (1985–1986)
- 175th Massachusetts General Court (1987–1988)
- 176th Massachusetts General Court (1989–1990)
- 177th Massachusetts General Court (1991–1992)
- 178th Massachusetts General Court (1993–1994)
- 179th Massachusetts General Court (1995–1996)
- 180th Massachusetts General Court (1997–1998)
- 181st Massachusetts General Court (1999–2000)

=== 2001–current ===
- 182nd Massachusetts General Court (2001–2002)
- 183rd Massachusetts General Court (2003–2004)
- 184th Massachusetts General Court (2005–2006)
- 185th Massachusetts General Court (2007–2008)
- 186th Massachusetts General Court (2009–2010)
- 187th Massachusetts General Court (2011–2012)
- 188th Massachusetts General Court (2013–2014)
- 189th Massachusetts General Court (2015–2016)
- 190th Massachusetts General Court (2017–2018)
- 191st Massachusetts General Court (2019–2020)
- 192nd Massachusetts General Court (2021–2022)
- 193rd Massachusetts General Court (2023–2024)
- 194th Massachusetts General Court (2025–2026)

== See also ==
- List of Massachusetts Senate delegations
- List of presidents of the Massachusetts Senate
- List of former districts of the Massachusetts Senate
- List of speakers of the Massachusetts House of Representatives
- List of former districts of the Massachusetts House of Representatives
- Old State House (Boston) building in which the legislature met until 1798
- Massachusetts State House, built in 1798
- List of governors of Massachusetts
- Historical outline of Massachusetts
- Lists of United States state legislative sessions
