= 22nd Continental Regiment =

Regiment of the Continental Army

2nd Connecticut Regiment (1775)
- Recruitment Area
- Active: 1775
- Allegiance: Continental Congress of the United States
- Type: Infantry
- Size: 1000 soldiers

Commanders
- Notable commanders: Colonel Joseph Spencer Colonel Samuel Wyllys

22nd Continental Regiment
- Active: 1776
- Allegiance: Continental Congress of the United States
- Type: Infantry
- Size: 728 officers and men

Commanders
- Notable commanders: Colonel Samuel Wyllys

The 22nd Continental Regiment was originally authorized as the 2nd Connecticut Regiment in the Connecticut State Troops and was organized from ten companies of volunteers from Hartford county in the state of Connecticut, United States, between 1–20 May 1775. It was adopted on 14 June 1775 into the Main Continental Army and assigned 22 July 1775 to Spencer's Brigade. The regiment was re-organized on 1 January 1776 to eight companies and re-designated as the22nd Continental Regiment.

On 12 August 1776 Spencer's Brigade was re-designated as Parson's Brigade and on 12 November 1776 the brigade was reassigned to the Highland's Department. The regiment was reassigned to Mercer's Brigade of the Main Continental Army on the same date. On 31 December 1776, the regiment was dissolved in Peekskill, New York.

== See also ==
- Joseph Spencer
- Levi Wells
- Samuel Wyllys
