= Joseph M. Bell =

American politician (1787–1851)

President of the Massachusetts Senate
- In office 1849
- Preceded by: Zeno Scudder
- Succeeded by: Marshall Pinckney Wilder

Member of the Massachusetts Senate
- In office 1848–1849

Member of the Massachusetts House of Representatives
- In office 1845–1847

Member of the New Hampshire House of Representatives
- In office 1821, 1828–1830

Personal details
- Born: March 21 (or 27), 1787 Bedford, New Hampshire, U.S.
- Died: July 25, 1851 (aged 64) Saratoga Springs, New York, U.S.
- Party: Whig
- Spouse(s): Catherine Olcott; Helen Olcott Choate
- Children: 5
- Education: Dartmouth College
- Occupation: Lawyer; abolitionist; politician

Joseph M. Bell (March 21, 1787 – July 25, 1851) was a New Hampshire and Massachusetts lawyer, abolitionist, and politician. Bell served as a member of the New Hampshire House of Representatives in 1821 and from 1828 to 1830 and the Massachusetts House of Representatives from 1845 to 1847. He served as a member of the Massachusetts Senate from 1848 to 1849 and President of the Massachusetts Senate in 1849.

== Early life ==
Joseph M. Bell was born on March 21, 1787 (or March 27, 1787), in Bedford, New Hampshire to Mary (née Houston) and Joseph Bell. He graduated from Dartmouth College in 1807. He then worked as principal of Haverhill Academy in Haverhill, New Hampshire for one year. He studied law; reading law in the offices of Governor Samuel Bell, Judge Samuel Dana and Governor Jeremiah Smith. He was admitted to the bar in 1811.

== Career ==
Bell worked as a cashier with the Coos Bank and later became the bank president. In 1811, he started a law practice in Haverhill. Bell joined the New Hampshire Militia, Second Division, around 1818.

Bell was appointed as Solicitor for Grafton County, New Hampshire. He worked in that role from 1815 to 1820. He served in the New Hampshire House of Representatives, representing Haverhill, in 1821 and from 1828 to 1830. Bell ran for U.S. Congress as a Whig in 1835. In 1842, Bell moved his law practice to Boston and partnered with Henry F. Durant, founder of Wellesley College. Bell also practiced law with his uncle and father-in-law Rufus Choate.

Bell represented Boston in the General Court from 1844 to 1847. Bell served as a member of the Massachusetts House of Representatives, representing Suffolk County, from 1845 to 1847. Bell served as a member of the Massachusetts Senate, representing Suffolk County, from 1848 to 1849. He served as President of the Massachusetts Senate in 1849.

== Personal life ==
Bell married Catherine Olcott, daughter of Mills Olcott of Hanover, New Hampshire. Bell married Helen Olcott Choate, daughter of Rufus Choate and niece of his former wife. He had five children, including two daughters. Bell was friends with Daniel Webster.

In December 1821, Bell purchased the Wentworth Brown House in Haverhill. Later in life, Bell lived in Boston. He owned property in Massachusetts, Vermont and New Hampshire.

Bell died on July 25, 1851, at Saratoga Springs, New York, while on vacation with his family.

== Awards ==
Bell received an honorary LL.D. degree from Dartmouth College in 1837.

Political offices
Preceded by Zeno Scudder	President of the Massachusetts Senate; 1849	Succeeded by Marshall Pinckney Wilder
