= Levi Wells =

American politician (1734–1803)

Levi Wells (1734–1803) was an American officer in the French and Indian War and the American Revolution, and a Connecticut politician.

Wells was born in 1734 in Colchester, Connecticut Colony. He served as an officer in the French and Indian War, and following the outbreak of the American Revolution in 1775, was commissioned as captain of Company 8 of Colonel Joseph Spencer's 2nd Connecticut Regiment. In that capacity, Wells saw action in the Battle of Bunker Hill and the Siege of Boston.

On January 1, 1776, the 2nd Connecticut became the 22nd Continental, with Levi Wells appointed major under Colonel Samuel Wyllys. During the Battle of Long Island, Major Wells was taken prisoner on August 27, 1776. He was imprisoned in the Provost jail in New York for about five months, and was a roommate of Colonel Ethan Allen. In his writings, Allen remarked that Major Wells' "fidelity and zealous attachment to [his] country's cause" was the reason for his confinement.

In the spring of 1780, Wells, now a lieutenant colonel, was placed in command of a Connecticut militia regiment. He was captured again during the Battle of Horseneck on December 9, 1780. After his release, he served for the remainder of the war.

Following his service in the American Revolution, Colonel Wells represented Ellington in the Connecticut General Assembly in 1789 and 1790. He died in Ellington on December 18, 1803.
