= Jeremiah Powell =

American politician

Member of the Massachusetts Senate
- In office October 25, 1780 – 1782

2nd President of the Massachusetts Senate
- In office November 4, 1780 – 1782

Jeremiah Powell was an American politician who served as a member, and the second President of, the Massachusetts Senate.

== Massachusetts Senate ==
Powell was elected the President of the Massachusetts Senate on November 4, 1780 to fill the position after Thomas Cushing resigned to become the Lieutenant Governor of Massachusetts.

== Notes ==
Massachusetts Senate
Preceded by Thomas Cushing	2nd President of the Massachusetts Senate; November 4, 1780 – 1782	Succeeded by Samuel Adams
