= Gideon Barstow =

American politician (1783–1852)

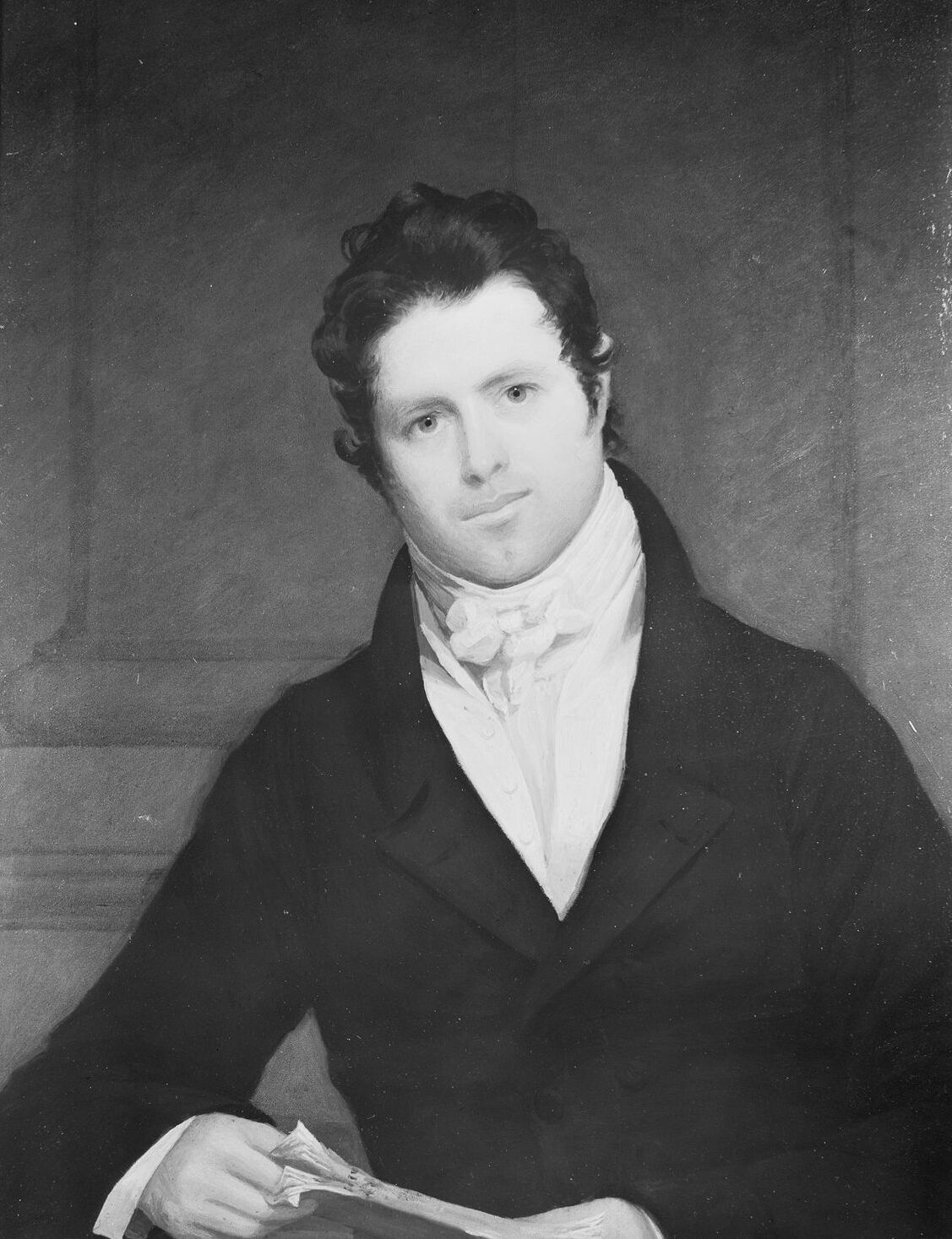
- Portrait by James Frothingham

Member of the U.S. House of Representatives from Massachusetts's 2nd district
- In office March 4, 1821 - March 3, 1823
- Preceded by: Nathaniel Silsbee
- Succeeded by: Benjamin W. Crowninshield

Member of the Massachusetts House of Representatives
- In office 1823; 1829; 1833; 1837

Member of the Massachusetts Senate
- In office 1827; 1834

Personal details
- Born: September 7, 1783 Mattapoisett, Massachusetts
- Died: March 26, 1852 (aged 68) St. Augustine, Florida
- Party: Democratic-Republican, Adams-Clay Democratic-Republican
- Children: Gideon Forrester Barstow

Gideon Barstow (September 7, 1783 – March 26, 1852) was a U.S. representative from Massachusetts. Born in Mattapoisett, Massachusetts, Barstow attended the common schools and Brown University, Providence, Rhode Island from 1799 to 1801. He studied medicine, was admitted to practice and settled in Salem, Massachusetts. He served as member of the Massachusetts Constitutional Convention of 1820–1821.

Barstow was elected as a Democratic-Republican to the Seventeenth Congress (March 4, 1821 – March 3, 1823), but was not a candidate for renomination in 1822. He served as member of the Massachusetts House of Representatives, and served in the Massachusetts State Senate. He served as presidential elector on the Whig ticket of Clay and Sergeant in 1832. He moved to St. Augustine, Florida, because of ill health and engaged in mercantile pursuits. Barstow died in St. Augustine March 26, 1852 and was interred in Huguenot Cemetery.

U.S. House of Representatives
Preceded by Nathaniel Silsbee	Member of the U.S. House of Representatives from Massachusetts's 2nd congressional district March 4, 1821-March 3, 1823	Succeeded by Benjamin W. Crowninshield
