= Ensign H. Kellogg =

American politician

Ensign Hosmer Kellogg

Member of the Massachusetts State Senate Berkshire District
- In office 1877–1877

Member of the Massachusetts State Senate Berkshire District
- In office 1853–1854

Speaker of the Massachusetts House of Representatives

Member of the Massachusetts House of Representatives

Personal details
- Born: July 6, 1812 Sheffield, Massachusetts
- Died: January 23, 1882 (aged 69) Pittsfield, Massachusetts
- Party: Whig, Republican
- Spouse(s): Caroline Campbell, m. 1841.
- Education: Amherst College, B.A. 1836
- Profession: Lawyer

Ensign Hosmer Kellogg (July 6, 1812 – January 23, 1882) was an American lawyer, businessman, and politician. He was a member of the Massachusetts House of Representatives and Massachusetts Senate. In 1850, he served as Speaker of the Massachusetts House of Representatives.

== Early life ==
Kellogg was born in July 1812 to Elisha and Jane (Saxton) Kellogg in Sheffield, Massachusetts.

== Business career ==
Kellogg was president of the Western Massachusetts Insurance Company from 1857 to 1865, and the Berkshire Agricultural Society in 1860 and 1861. Kellogg was both president of the Pontoosuc Woolen Company from 1861, and of the Agricultural National Bank from 1866, until his death in 1882. Kellogg also developed the Morningside neighborhood to the north of Pittsfield's downtown.

== Public service career ==
=== Massachusetts House of Representatives ===
Kellogg was a member of the Massachusetts House of Representatives in 1843, 1844, 1849-1851 and 1870-1871, also in 1850 Kellogg was Speaker of Massachusetts House.

=== Massachusetts State Senate ===
Kellogg was in the Massachusetts State Senate in 1853-1854 and in 1877.

=== 1860 Republican National Convention ===
Kellogg was a delegate to the 1860 Republican National Convention.

=== Fisheries commission ===
In 1876, Kellogg was appointed by President Rutherford B. Hayes to serve as a member of the Halifax Fisheries Commission.

== Death ==
Kellogg died after a brief illness in Pittsfield, Massachusetts, on January 23, 1882.

Political offices
| Preceded by Francis Crowninshield | Speaker of the Massachusetts House of Representatives; 1850 | Succeeded by Nathaniel Prentice Banks |

== See also ==
- 1850 Massachusetts legislature
- 1876 Massachusetts legislature
- 1877 Massachusetts legislature
