= Joseph Whiton =

19th century American politician (1759–1828)

Member of the Massachusetts Senate from the Berkshire County district
- In office May 1813 – May 1815 Serving with Wolcott Hubbell
- Preceded by: William Towner & Samuel Barstow
- Succeeded by: Timothy Child & William P. Walker

Member of the Massachusetts House of Representatives from the Berkshire County district
- In office: May 1810 – May 1813; May 1804 – May 1805; May 1801 – May 1802; May 1799 – May 1800

Personal details
- Born: November 9, 1759 Chatham, Connecticut Colony, British America
- Died: August 16, 1828 (aged 68) Lee, Massachusetts, U.S.
- Resting place: Fairmount Cemetery, Lee, Massachusetts
- Spouse: Amanda Garfield (m. 1793–1828)
- Children: Samantha (Whiton)^{(b. 1794; died 1878)}; Harriet (Freeman)^{(b. 1796; died 1872)}; Amanda (Church)^{(b. 1797; died 1869)}; Joseph Lucas Whiton Sr.^{(b. 1799; died 1869)}; Daniel Garfield Whiton^{(b. 1801; died 1866)}; Edward Vernon Whiton Sr.^{(b. 1805; died 1859)}; Eliza (Daniel)^{(b. 1807; died 1885)}; Catharine (Howe)^{(b. 1810; died 1838)}; Agnes (Brown)^{(b. 1813; died 1874)}

Military service
- Allegiance: United States
- Branch/service: Connecticut militia Massachusetts militia
- Years of service: 1776–1777; 1780–1782; 1812–1815
- Rank: Major General, Mass.
- Unit: Experience Storr's reg.; Jonathan Lattimer's reg.; Levi Wells' reg.; David Waterbury's reg.
- Commands: 9th Div. Mass. Militia
- Battles/wars: American Revolutionary War; War of 1812

Joseph Whiton (November 9, 1759 – August 16, 1828) was an American farmer, merchant, and politician from Lee, Massachusetts. He served through much of the American Revolutionary War as an enlisted man and junior officer in Connecticut militia regiments. He later served as a major general in the Massachusetts militia, and commanded the defense of Boston during the War of 1812. Whiton also served nine years as a member of the Massachusetts General Court, serving in both the Massachusetts Senate and Massachusetts House of Representatives, and served as a justice of the Massachusetts Court of Common Pleas.

All three of Whiton's sons became judges. Most notably, his youngest son, Edward V. Whiton, became the first elected chief justice of the Wisconsin Supreme Court.

== Early life ==
Joseph Whiton was born in what is now Middlesex County, Connecticut, in 1759. His father died when he was 8 years old, and he and his brothers were sent to live with their father's cousin Elijah "Squire" Whiton in Ashford, Connecticut.

== Revolutionary War service ==
In August 1776, not yet 17 years old, Whiton enlisted with the Connecticut militia for service in the American Revolutionary War. He served with Captain Simeon Smith's company in Colonel Experience Storr's regiment. The following year, he served in Captain Isaac Stone's company in Colonel Jonathan Lattimer's regiment. With that regiment, he participated in the Battles of Saratoga preceding the surrender of British general John Burgoyne.

In April 1780, he enlisted again and was acting steward in Captain Bottome's company, in Colonel Levi Wells's regiment. The following year, he was adjutant of the battalion of Major Elijah Humphrey in the regiment of Colonel David Waterbury. His battalion served the defense of New Haven during that time.

Whiton was apparently wounded in his first term of service in 1776, and received pay as a wounded soldier. He also received a pension, including a tract of land in the Connecticut Western Reserve (now northern Ohio). Whiton never lived on that land, but it became a home for several of his descendants.

== Political career in Massachusetts ==
After the war, Whiton moved to Berkshire County, Massachusetts, and taught school for a short time before settling in the town of Lee, Massachusetts. In Lee, he opened a store and became a prominent citizen, serving in several local offices; he was a justice of the peace, a member of the first committee of school examiners in the town, and served ten years as a town selectman. He was elected to his first of at least six terms in the Massachusetts House of Representatives in 1799, serving again in 1801, 1804, 1810, 1811, and 1812; in 1813, he was elected to represent Berkshire County in the Massachusetts Senate for two years. During these years he also served in the Massachusetts militia as brigadier general in command of the 9th division of the militia, and was promoted to major general before 1812.

He was a member of the Massachusetts House at the time of the outbreak of the War of 1812. Massachusetts—like the rest of New England—had been strongly opposed to the new war, and prominent leaders in Massachusetts had denounced President James Madison. Massachusetts governor Caleb Strong refused to send Massachusetts militia to support the war effort, and in response, Madison refused to send any U.S. forces to defend Massachusetts. Despite their attempt to stay out of the war, the British blockaded the Massachusetts coast and began raids on several coastal towns.

In the fall of 1814, the British seemed poised to attack Boston. Responding to this crisis, the Massachusetts governor called up the Massachusetts militia and tasked Whiton with commanding the defense of Boston. Boston's defenses were significantly bolstered during these months, as 5,000 militia streamed into the city. A new fort—Fort Strong—was constructed in Boston Harbor, and teams of axe-men were assigned to each bridge surrounding the city with orders to destroy the bridges if the British approached. The British never ultimately attempted to take Boston during this war.

After his term in the Senate, Lee served as an associate justice of the Court of Common Pleas in the town of Lee, serving in that role for most of the rest of his life.

Joseph Whiton died at his home in Lee, Massachusetts, on August 16, 1828.

== Personal life and family ==
Joseph Whiton was the fourth son and seventh of nine known children of James Whiton IV (1712–1768) and Molly (née Lucas; b. 1723). Both parents were descendants of early American colonists. The Whiton family were descendants of James Whiton I (1624–1710), who emigrated from England to the Massachusetts Bay Colony in 1640. Molly Lucas was a descendant of a Mayflower passenger. James Whiton IV was involved in sea trade, and was described as having interests in the West Indies.

After his father's death, Joseph and his brothers were sent to live with their father's cousin, Elijah "Squire" Whiton. Elijah had fifteen children of his own, of similar age to Joseph and his siblings. Elijah was a successful farmer, as well as a cooper and wheelwright. He also served at least one term in the Connecticut House of Representatives.

Joseph Whiton married relatively late in life for his era, at age 34. He married Amanda Garfield on October 17, 1793, in Lee, Massachusetts. They had nine known children. All three sons, Joseph Lucas Whiton, Daniel Garfield Whiton, and Edward Vernon Whiton, went on to become judges. The elder two in Ohio, and Edward in Wisconsin. Edward had the most prestigious career of the three, serving as a framer of the Constitution of Wisconsin and rising to become the first elected chief justice of the Wisconsin Supreme Court.

Massachusetts Senate
Preceded by William Towner & Samuel Barstow	Member of the Massachusetts Senate from the Berkshire County district May 1813 – May 1815; Served alongside: Wolcott Hubbell	Succeeded by Timothy Child & William P. Walker
