= Marshall Pinckney Wilder (politician) =

American politician

Marshall Pickney Wilder
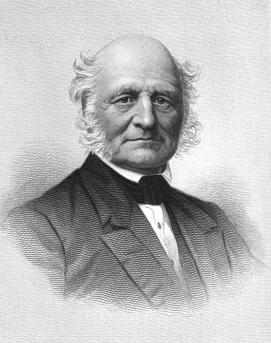

President of the Massachusetts Senate
- In office 1850–1850
- Preceded by: Joseph M. Bell
- Succeeded by: Henry Wilson

Member of the Massachusetts Senate

Member of the Massachusetts Governor's Council
- In office 1849–1849

Member of the Massachusetts House of Representatives

Personal details
- Born: September 22, 1798 Rindge, New Hampshire
- Died: December 16, 1886 (aged 88) Dorchester, Massachusetts
- Party: Whig
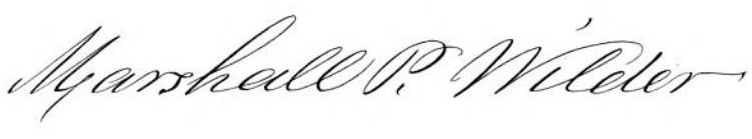
- Signature

Marshall Pickney Wilder (September 22, 1798 – December 16, 1886) was a Massachusetts merchant, amateur horticulturalist, and politician who served in the Massachusetts House of Representatives, on the Massachusetts Governor's Council as a member and President of, the Massachusetts Senate.

As a pomologist he was founder (1848) and longtime president of the American Pomological Society, and he gave many addresses on the topic of horticulture during his career.

Wilder's great-nephew and namesake was an actor, Marshall Pinckney Wilder (1859–1915).

== See also ==
- 71st Massachusetts General Court (1850)

Political offices
Preceded by Joseph M. Bell	President of the Massachusetts Senate; 1850	Succeeded by Henry Wilson
