= Nathaniel Silsbee =

American politician (1773–1850)

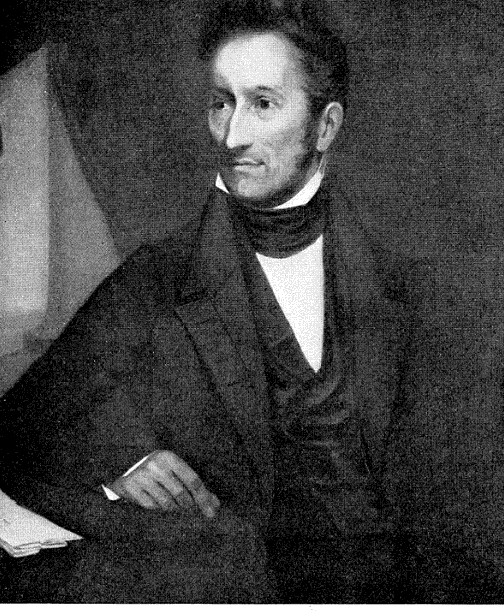

United States Senator from Massachusetts
- In office May 31, 1826 – March 3, 1835
- Preceded by: James Lloyd
- Succeeded by: John Davis

Member of the U.S. House of Representatives from Massachusetts's 2nd district
- In office March 4, 1817 – March 3, 1821
- Preceded by: Timothy Pickering
- Succeeded by: Gideon Barstow

President of the Massachusetts State Senate
- In office 1823–1825
- Preceded by: John Phillips
- Succeeded by: John Mills

Personal details
- Born: January 14, 1773 Salem, Province of Massachusetts Bay, British America
- Died: July 14, 1850 (aged 77) Salem, Massachusetts, U.S.
- Party: Federalist; National Republican; Whig
- Spouse: Mary Crowninshield
- Relations: Jared Sparks, Son in law.
- Children: Nathaniel Silsbee, Jr. Mary Crowninshield Silsbee; Georgina Silsbee
- Occupation: Merchant

Nathaniel Silsbee (January 14, 1773 – July 14, 1850) was a ship master, merchant and American politician from Salem, Massachusetts.

== Early life ==
Silsbee was born on January 14, 1773 in Salem, Province of Massachusetts Bay, then a part of British America. He was the eldest child of Capt. Nathaniel Silsbee (1748–1791) and Sarah (née Becket) Silsbee (1750–1832). Among his younger siblings were Zachariah F. Silsbee, who married Sarah Boardman (a daughter of Capt. Francis Boardman). Through his brother Zachariah, he was uncle to Caroline Silsbee, who married fellow Salem merchant Dudley Leavitt Pickman.

== Career ==
At the age of fourteen, to support his family upon the financial failures of his father, he went to sea and learned navigation. His able seamanship won him, at the age of nineteen, command of Elias Hasket Derby's Sloop "Sally". Silsbee continued commanding Derby vessels and had many interesting adventures and exploits with privateers, French Consuls, and such.

In 1795, he became part owner of the Schooner "Betsy" and continued to prosper and master his own vessels. He founded Silsbee & Pickman, one of the largest Salem trading houses, operated by Silsbee and Dudley Leavitt Pickman. In 1801 he placed his brothers, William and Zachariah, in charge of his ships. Nathaniel continued owning vessels in partnerships until the 1840s, but he actively retired from shipping when he commenced his political career.

=== Political career ===
Silsbee was elected to the United States House of Representatives and served two terms from March 4, 1817, to March 3, 1821, during which time he was chairman of the U.S. House Committee on Military Pensions in the Twenty-first Congress. He declined to be a candidate for renomination in 1820, choosing to serve in the Massachusetts House of Representatives instead. After one term, he was elected to the Massachusetts Senate, where he served as president from 1823 to 1825. He was a presidential elector in 1824.

He was elected to the United States Senate in 1826 to fill the vacancy in the term ending March 3, 1829, caused by the resignation of James Lloyd. He was re-elected in 1829 and served from May 31, 1826, to March 3, 1835. He was chairman of the U.S. Senate Committee on Commerce in the Twenty-third Congress. He was a Whig presidential elector in 1836.

=== Later life ===
After his service as a U.S. Senator ended, Silsbee returned to Salem where he resumed mercantile pursuits.

== Personal life ==
On December 12, 1802, Silsbee was married to Mary Crowninshield (1778–1835), the daughter of Mary (née Derby) Crowninshield and Capt. George Crowninshield, one of Salem's wealthiest merchants. Her brothers included Secretary of the Navy Benjamin Williams Crowninshield, U.S. Representative Jacob Crowninshield, and George Crowninshield Jr., who owned Cleopatra's Barge, the first yacht to cross the Atlantic. Together, they were the parents of:

- Nathaniel Silsbee Jr. (1804–1881), who served as mayor of Salem from 1849 to 1850 and from 1858 to 1859.
- Mary Crowninshield Silsbee (1809–1887), who married, as his second wife, Jared Sparks, the 17th President of Harvard College, in 1839. His first wife, Frances Anne Allen, had died in 1835.
- Georgiana Crowninshield Silsbee (1824–1901), who married Francis Henry Appleton in 1846. After his death in 1854, she married Henry Saltonstall in 1855.

Silsbee died on July 14, 1850. He was interred at The Burying Point, the second oldest cemetery in the U.S.

=== Legacy ===
The Nathaniel Silsbee House is a historic building in Salem, maintained by the Knights of Columbus until the beginning of 2018 when they sold the building and it was converted to condominiums.

== See also ==
- 44th Massachusetts General Court (1823-1824)

U.S. House of Representatives
Preceded by Timothy Pickering	Member of the U.S. House of Representatives from Massachusetts's 2nd congressional district March 4, 1817 – March 3, 1821	Succeeded by Gideon Barstow
U.S. Senate
Preceded by James Lloyd	U.S. senator (Class 2) from Massachusetts; May 31, 1826 – March 3, 1835; Served alongside: Elijah H. Mills, Daniel Webster	Succeeded by John Davis
Political offices
Preceded by John Phillips	President of the Massachusetts Senate; 1823–1826	Succeeded by John Mills
