= John Phillips (mayor) =

American politician (1770–1823)

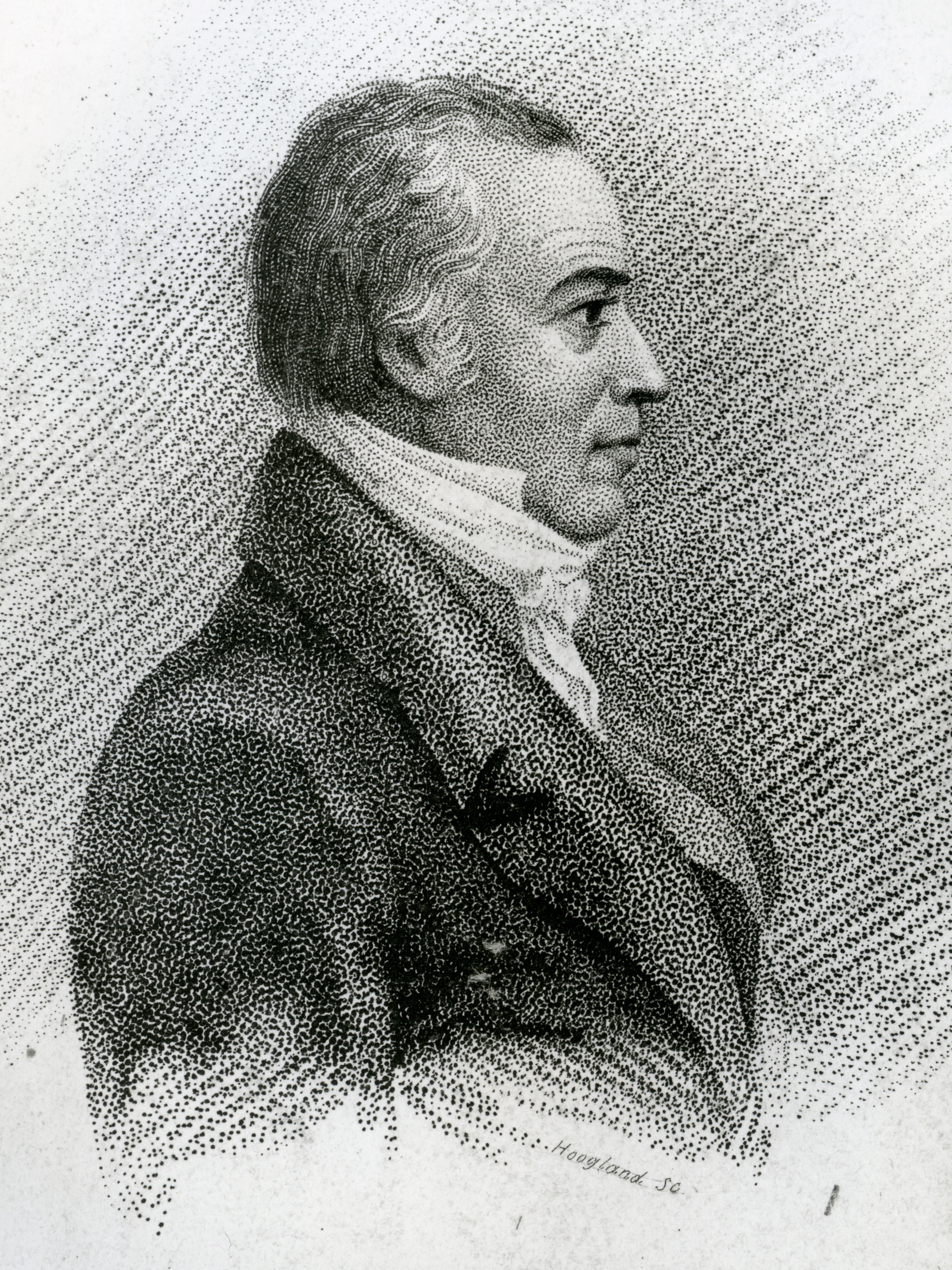
- Posthumous portrait, 1825

1st Mayor of Boston
- In office May 1, 1822 – May 1, 1823
- Preceded by: Eliphalet Williams (Chairman of the Board of Selectmen)
- Succeeded by: Josiah Quincy III

12th President of the Massachusetts Senate
- In office 1813–1823
- Preceded by: Samuel Dana
- Succeeded by: Nathaniel Silsbee

Member of the Massachusetts Senate for Suffolk County
- In office 1813 – May 29, 1823

Personal details
- Born: November 26, 1770 Boston, Massachusetts Bay Colony, British America
- Died: May 29, 1823 (aged 52) Boston, Massachusetts, US
- Party: Federalist
- Spouse: Sally Walley (m. December 1794)
- Children: 8, including Wendell Phillips
- Education: Harvard College
- Profession: Attorney (admitted to the Massachusetts bar 1791)

John Phillips (November 26, 1770 – May 29, 1823) was an American politician from Boston, Massachusetts, serving as the first mayor of Boston from 1822 to 1823. He also served as the 12th president of the Massachusetts Senate from 1813 to 1823. He was the father of abolitionist Wendell Phillips.

Phillips' tenure as mayor was largely defined by his organization of the new city government.

== Early life and education ==
John Phillips was born in Boston, Massachusetts, on November 26, 1770, to William and Margaret Phillips. His father was a descendant of the Rev. George Phillips of Watertown, the progenitor of the New England Phillips family in America. Widowed early into John's life, his mother used their home as a dry goods store. It was later sold to become the location of the first Jordan Marsh in 1841.

At the age of seven, Phillips enrolled in Phillips Academy, founded by Samuel Phillips Jr., a distant relative, where he eventually graduated. Phillips then went on to Harvard College, graduating in 1788.

Phillips was admitted to the bar in 1791 after studying law under Thomas Dawes. In 1794, he was invited to deliver the annual Fourth of July oration before the people of Boston, an address which was said to have displayed "the finest marks of intellectual vigor".

== Early political career ==
Phillips was made public prosecutor in 1800. In 1801, Phillips unsuccessfully ran for a seat in the Massachusetts House of Representatives from Boston, however was elected in his second bid in 1803, only serving a single one-year term.

Phillips was elected as a Federalist to represent Suffolk County in the Massachusetts Senate in 1804. Phillips was near unanimously elected as President of the Massachusetts Senate in 1813 and served until 1823. Phillips was made a judge of the Court of Common Pleas in 1809, was elected a Fellow of the American Academy of Arts and Sciences in 1810, and in 1812, he was chosen a member of the corporation of Harvard. In 1813, Phillips was also elected a member of the American Antiquarian Society. Phillips was further elected to the Massachusetts Governor's Council in 1805, 1809, and 1812, but declined all three offers.

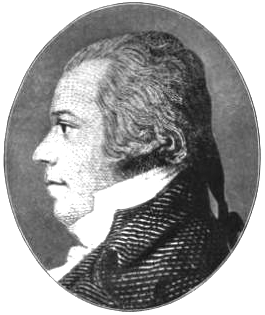
Early portrait of Phillips

In 1820, Phillips was elected as a member of the Massachusetts Constitutional Convention of 1820-1821, and he took an active part in the proceedings of that body, being a candidate for its president on the second ballot before losing to Isaac Parker.

== Mayoralty ==
=== Election as mayor ===
Phillips was also engaged in the agitation for the adoption of a city government in Boston and was chairman of the committee of twelve that drew up and reported on a city charter for the town in 1822.

In the ensuing first Boston mayoral election, Harrison Gray Otis and Josiah Quincy III, both noted Federalists, were the chief candidates for the office. Both lead particularly scathing campaigns, alienating Democratic-Republicans in Boston and causing them to vote for various scattering candidates. While able to secure a plurality over Otis, Quincy, dissatisfied with his inability to secure a full majority, and against his followers' wishes, withdrew from the second ballot, opening the path for a compromise candidate.

Respected among all classes and factions within Boston, Phillips was asked by the followers of both Otis and Quincy to enter the election. He did so and won nearly 93% of the vote.

=== Tenure as mayor ===
Phillips was inaugurated as mayor on May 1, 1822, and largely followed the city charter in his governance. His conduct as mayor was described as "conservative, kind, and conciliatory" with a "republican simplicity", and he enjoyed the confidence of all factions. Much of his mayoralty was spent organizing the new city government, and his conservative tendencies led him to preserve much of the old political structures within Boston, to the mild annoyance of those who expected immediate radical changes.

Phillips simultaneously held both the offices of mayor of Boston and president of the Massachusetts Senate, and on April 17, 1822, was elected in a special election as fire warden for Boston's ward 11.

At the close of his term of office the precarious condition of his health led him to decline a re-election.

== Personal life ==
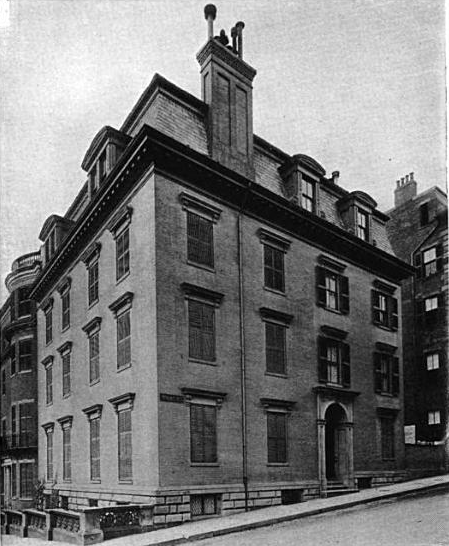
Phillips lived on Beacon Street, at the corner of Walnut Street, in Boston from 1804 until his death in 1823.

In 1794, Phillips married Sally Walley, with whom he had eight surviving children, one of whom was the abolitionist orator Wendell Phillips. He was an Evangelical.

Phillips died on May 29, 1823, twenty-eight days after leaving office as mayor. He was 52.

== Legacy ==
Josiah Quincy III, Phillips' successor as mayor, said of him, "His administration laid the foundation of the prosperity of our city deep and on right principles".

Harrison Gray Otis, a predecessor of Phillips' as Massachusetts Senate President and a later mayor of Boston, remarked that his "aim was to allure, not to repel, to reconcile by gentle reforms, not to revolt by startling innovations".

Phillips Street and the Phillips School (later renamed after his son, Wendell) in Boston's Beacon Hill neighborhood were named after him.

== See also ==
- Timeline of Boston, 1820s

== Notes ==
Political offices
Preceded by None	1st Mayor of Boston, Massachusetts; May 1, 1822 – May 1, 1823	Succeeded by Josiah Quincy III
Preceded by Samuel Dana	President of the Massachusetts Senate; 1813–1823	Succeeded by Nathaniel Silsbee
