= President of the Massachusetts Senate =

Presiding officer

- Seal of the Senate of Massachusetts

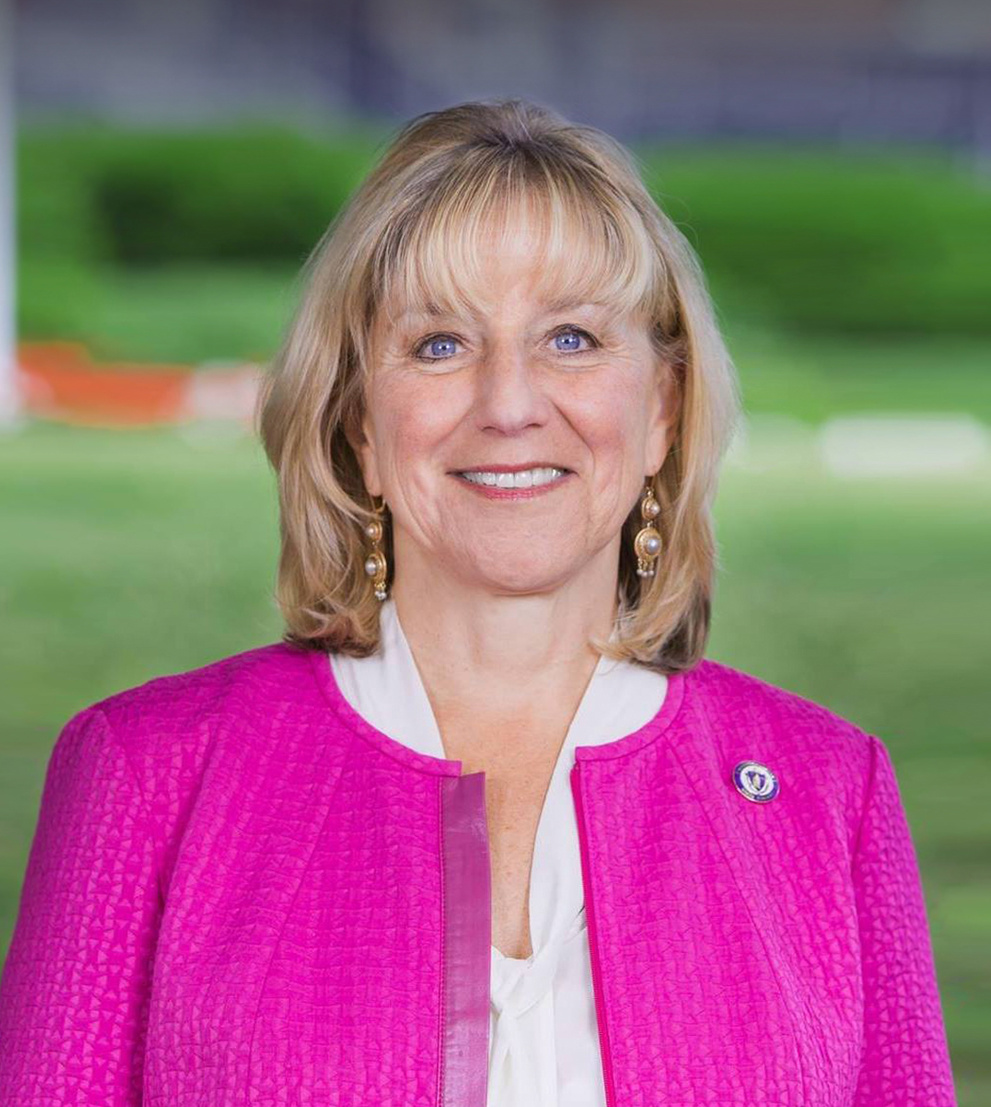
- Incumbent; Karen Spilka since July 26, 2018
- Government of Massachusetts
- Status: Presiding Officer
- Member of: General Court
- Residence: None official
- Seat: State House, Boston, Massachusetts
- Nominator: Majority party of the chamber
- Appointer: The Senate
- Term length: Two Years, no term limit
- Constituting instrument: Constitution of Massachusetts
- Inaugural holder: Thomas Cushing
- Formation: October 25, 1780
- Deputy: President Pro Tempore

The president of the Massachusetts Senate is the presiding officer. Unlike the United States Congress, in which the vice president of the United States is the ex officio president of the United States Senate, in Massachusetts, the president of the Senate is elected from and by the senators. The president, therefore, typically comes from the majority party, and the president is then the de facto leader of that party.

The current president of the Massachusetts Senate, since July 26, 2018, is Karen Spilka, a Democrat from Ashland. Democrats have had a majority in the Senate since 1959. Notable former presidents of the Massachusetts Senate include U.S. president Calvin Coolidge.

== List of presidents of the Massachusetts Senate ==
#	President	Picture	Term	Party	Notes
1st	Thomas Cushing		October 25, 1780 – November 4, 1780		Cushing was elected as the first president of the Massachusetts Senate, he resigned on November 4, 1780, because he was elected the lieutenant governor of Massachusetts.
2nd	Jeremiah Powell		November 4, 1780 – 1782		
3rd	Samuel Adams		1782–1785		
4th	Samuel Phillips		1785–87; 1788–1801; 1801–02	F	
5th	Samuel Adams		1787–1788		
6th	David Cobb		1801–02; 1802–05	F	Served as a Member of the U.S. House of Representatives from Massachusetts's at-large congressional seat from March 4, 1793 – March 4, 1795.
7th	Harrison Gray Otis		1805–06	F	
8th	John Bacon		1806–1807	DR	
9th	Samuel Dana		1807–1808	DR	
10th	Harrison Gray Otis		1808–1811	F	
11th	Samuel Dana		1811–1813	DR	
12th	John Phillips		1813–1823		Served as the first Mayor of Boston, Massachusetts.
13th	Nathaniel Silsbee		1823–1826	F	
14th	John Mills		1826–1828		
15th	Sherman Leland		1828–1829		
16th	Samuel Lathrop		1829–1831	F	
17th	James Fowler		1830–1831		
18th	Leverett Saltonstall		1831	W	
19th	William Thorndike		1832		
20th	Benjamin T. Pickman		1833–1835		
21st	George Bliss		1835		
22nd	Horace Mann		1836–1837	W	
23rd	Myron Lawrence		1838–1839	W	
24th	Daniel P. King		1840–1841	W	
25th	Josiah Quincy Jr.		1842	W	
26th	Phineas W. Leland		1843	D	
27th	Frederick Robinson		1843	D	
28th	Josiah Quincy Jr.		1844	W	
29th	Levi Lincoln Jr.		1845	DR	
30th	William B. Calhoun		1846–1847	W	
31st	Zeno Scudder		1848	W	
32nd	Joseph M. Bell		1849	W	
33rd	Marshall Pinckney Wilder		1850	W	
34th	Henry Wilson		1851–1852	FS	Was the 18th Vice President of the United States (1873–1875) and a Senator from Massachusetts (1855–1873).
35th	Charles Henry Warren		1853	Whig	
36th	Charles Edward Cook		1854		
37th	Henry W. Benchley		1855	A	
38th	Elihu C. Baker		1856	A	
39th	Charles W. Upham		1857–1858	W	Member of the U.S. House of Representatives from Massachusetts's 6th district from March 4, 1853, to March 3, 1855.
40th	Charles Abner Phelps		1859–1860	R	Also served as the Speaker of the Massachusetts House of Representatives in 1856.
41st	William Claflin		1861	R	Also served as the 27th Governor of Massachusetts from 1869 to 1872, and as a member of the United States Congress from 1877 to 1881.
42nd	John Henry Clifford		1862	R	Also served as the Massachusetts Attorney General and, from 1853 to 1854, as the 21st Governor of Massachusetts.
43rd	Jonathan E. Field		1863–1865	R	
44th	Joseph Adams Pond		1866 – October 28, 1867		Died in office at age 40.
45th	George O. Brastow		1868–1869		Also served as a member of the Massachusetts Governor's Council, and as the first Mayor of Somerville, Massachusetts.
46th	Robert Carter Pitman		1869		Resigned
47th	George O. Brastow		1869		Also served as a member of the Massachusetts Governor's Council, and as the first Mayor of Somerville, Massachusetts.
48th	Horace Hopkins Coolidge		1870–1872		
49th	George B. Loring		1873–1876	R	
50th	John B. D. Cogswell		1877–1879	R	
51st	Robert R. Bishop		1880–1882	R	
52nd	George Glover Crocker		1883	R	
53rd	George A. Bruce		1884	R	Also served as the fourth Mayor of Somerville, Massachusetts.
54th	Albert E. Pillsbury		1885–1886	R	Served as the Attorney General of Massachusetts from 1891 to 1894. Drafted original bylaws of the NAACP.
55th	Halsey J. Boardman		1887–1888	R	
56th	Harris C. Hartwell		1889	R	
57th	Henry H. Sprague		1890–1891	R	
58th	Alfred S. Pinkerton		1892–1893	R	
59th	William M. Butler		1894–1895	R	Also served as United States Senator from Massachusetts from November 13, 1924, to December 6, 1926, and was chairman of the Republican National Committee from 1924 to 1928.
60th	George P. Lawrence		1896–1897	R	
61st	George E. Smith		1898–1900	R	
62nd	Rufus A. Soule		1901–1902	R	
63rd	George R. Jones		1903–1904	R	
64th	William F. Dana		1905–1906	R	
65th	William D. Chapple		1907–1908	R	
66th	Allen T. Treadway		1909–1911	R	Served as a member of the United States House of Representatives from March 4, 1913, until January 3, 1945.
67th	Levi H. Greenwood		1912–1913	R	
68th	Calvin Coolidge		1914–1915	R	Later served as the 30th President of the United States (1923–1929).
69th	Henry Gordon Wells		1916–1918	R	
70th	Edwin T. McKnight		1919–1920	R	
71st	Frank G. Allen		1921–1924	R	Also was the 51st Governor of Massachusetts.
72nd	Wellington Wells		1925–1928	R	
73rd	Gaspar G. Bacon		1929–1932	R	
74th	Erland F. Fish		1933–1934	R	
75th	James G. Moran		1935–1936	R	Elected by 19 Democrats and 1 Republican.
76th	Samuel H. Wragg		1937–1938	R	
77th	Joseph R. Cotton		1939–1940	R	
78th	Angier L. Goodwin		1941	R	
79th	Jarvis Hunt		1942–1944	R	
80th	Arthur W. Coolidge		1945–1946	R	
81st	Donald W. Nicholson		1947	R	
82nd	Harris S. Richardson		1948	R	
83rd	Chester A. Dolan Jr.		1949	D	
	Harris S. Richardson		1950	R	
84th	Richard I. Furbush		1951–1956	R	
85th	Newland H. Holmes		1957–1958	R	
86th	John E. Powers		1959–1964	D	
87th	Maurice A. Donahue		1964–1971	D	
88th	Kevin B. Harrington		1971–1978	D	
89th	William Bulger		1978–1996	D	
90th	Tom Birmingham		1996–2003	D	
91st	Robert Travaglini		2003–2007	D	
92nd	Therese Murray		2007–2015	D	
93rd	Stan Rosenberg		2015–2017	D	
94th	Harriette L. Chandler		2017–2018	D	
95th	Karen Spilka		2018–	D	

A = American, D = Democratic, R = Republican, W = Whig

== See also ==
- List of speakers of the Massachusetts House of Representatives
- List of Massachusetts General Courts

== Bibliography ==
- The Massachusetts State House, p. 141-42. Commonwealth of Massachusetts: Boston, 1953.
