= 1831 Massachusetts legislature =

American state legislature

52nd Massachusetts General Court
←	51st	53rd	→

Overview
- Legislative body: General Court
- Term: May 1831 – January 1832

Senate
- Members: 40
- President: Leverett Saltonstall

House
- Speaker: William B. Calhoun

Sessions
- 1st: May 25, 1831 – June 23, 1831

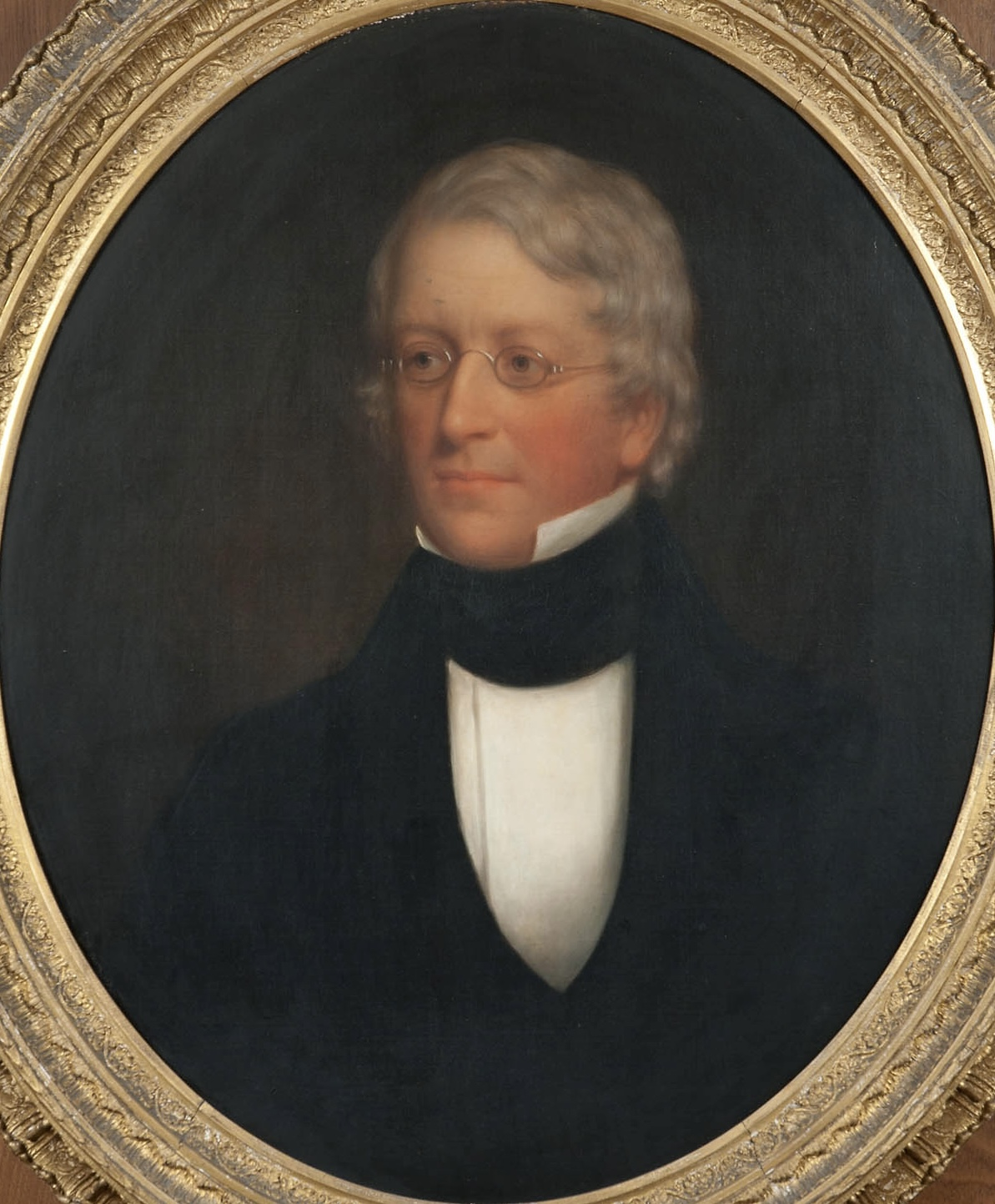
Leverett Saltonstall I, Senate president.

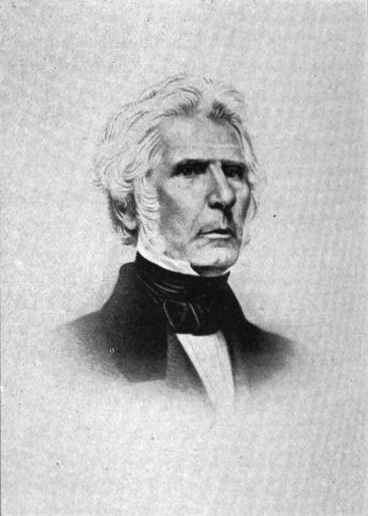
William Calhoun, House speaker.

Leaders of the Massachusetts General Court, 1831.

The 52nd Massachusetts General Court, consisting of the Massachusetts Senate and the Massachusetts House of Representatives, met in 1831 during the governorship of Levi Lincoln Jr. Leverett Saltonstall served as president of the Senate and William B. Calhoun served as speaker of the House.

Notable legislation included "a law to transfer state elections to the fall so as to coincide with national elections."

== Senators ==
- Samuel C. Allen
- John Bailey
- George Blake
- Ebenezer Bradbury
- Nathan Brooks
- Russell Brown
- Nathan C. Brownell
- Rufus Bullock
- Barker Burnell
- Chauncey Clarke
- Robert Cross
- Joseph Cummings
- Wilbur Curtis
- Ebenezer Daggett
- John Doane
- James Draper
- John Endicott
- Alexander H. Everett
- Otis Everett
- Enos Foote
- Samuel French
- William S. Hastings
- Elihu Hoyt
- William Johnson Jr.
- John W. Lincoln
- Solomon Lincoln Jr.
- James C. Merrill
- Stephen C. Phillips
- Benjamin T. Pickman
- Daniel Richardson
- Leverett Saltonstall
- Asahel Stearns
- William Thorndike
- Charles Train
- Samuel A. Turner
- Christopher Webb
- Charles Wells
- David Wilder
- Francis Winship
- John Wyles

== See also ==
- 22nd United States Congress
- List of Massachusetts General Courts
