= 1858 Massachusetts legislature =

American state legislature

79th Massachusetts General Court
←	78th	80th	→

Overview
- Legislative body: General Court

Senate
- Members: 40
- President: Charles Wentworth Upham

House
- Members: 240
- Speaker: Julius Rockwell

Sessions
- 1st: January 6, 1858 – March 27, 1858

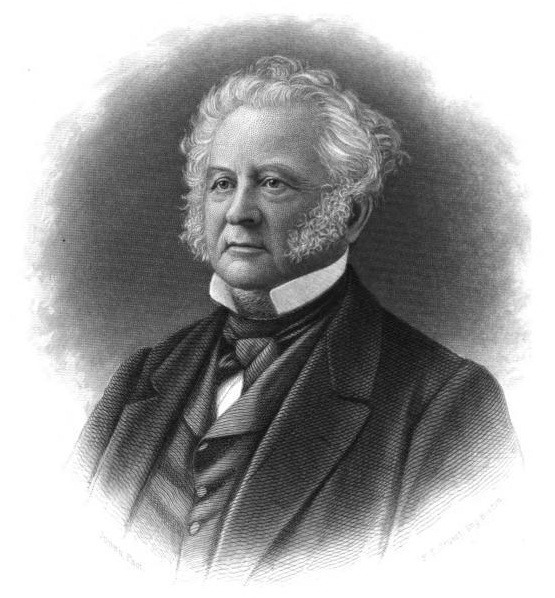
Charles Upham, Senate president.

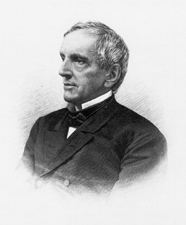
Julius Rockwell, House speaker.

Leaders of the Massachusetts General Court, 1858.

The 79th Massachusetts General Court, consisting of the Massachusetts Senate and the Massachusetts House of Representatives, met in 1858 during the governorship of Nathaniel Prentice Banks. Charles Wentworth Upham served as president of the Senate and Julius Rockwell served as speaker of the House.

Notable legislation included setting a salary of $300 per year for each member of the legislature.

== Committees ==
- Joint committees: Accounts; Agriculture; Banks and Banking; Claims; Education; Federal Relations; Fisheries; Library; Manufactures; Mercantile Affairs and Insurance; Militia; Parishes and Religious Societies; Prisons; Public Charitable Institutions.
- Senate committees: Bills in the Third Reading; Engrossed Bills; Judiciary; Printing; Probate and Chancery; Treasury.
- House committees: Bills in the Third Reading; County Estimates; Elections; Engrossed Bills; Finance; Judiciary; Leave of Absence; Pay Roll; Printing; Probate and Chancery; Public Buildings.

== Senators ==
- Samuel Adams
- Lucius S. Allen
- Aaron Bagg
- Goldsmith F. Bailey
- Albert Bliss
- Arthur P. Bonney
- James W. Boyden
- John Branning
- Jos. W. Cornell
- Zenas M. Crane
- William T. Davis
- John M. Earle
- Mathias Ellis
- Con'tine C. Esty
- William Fabens
- Oliver C. Felton
- Charles Field
- Oliver Frost
- Hugh W. Greene
- Gideon Haynes
- Abner Holbrook
- Samuel Hooper
- Joseph F. Ingalls
- Elijah Jenkins
- Horatio G. Knight
- John M. Merrick
- John G. Metcalf
- John Morissey
- Francis J. Parker
- Charles A. Phelps
- Edward F. Porter
- John Prince
- Chester I. Reed
- Timothy T. Sawyer
- Eben F. Stone
- Charles F. Swift
- John M. Turner
- Charles W. Upham
- James M. Usher
- George Walker

== See also ==
- 35th United States Congress
- List of Massachusetts General Courts
