= Senator Pickman =

Senator Pickman may refer to:

- Benjamin T. Pickman (1819–1835), Massachusetts State Senate
- Benjamin Pickman Jr. (1763–1843), Massachusetts State Senate
- Dudley Leavitt Pickman (1779–1846), Massachusetts State Senate
