= Benjamin Pickman =

Benjamin Pickman may refer to:

- Benjamin Pickman Jr. (1763–1843), U.S. Representative from Massachusetts
- Benjamin T. Pickman (1819–1835), Massachusetts politician
