= George Bliss (Massachusetts politician) =

American businessman and politician (1793–1873)

Speaker of the Massachusetts House of Representatives
- In office 1853–1853
- Preceded by: Nathaniel Prentice Banks
- Succeeded by: Otis Phillips Lord

Member of the Massachusetts House of Representatives

21st President of the Massachusetts Senate
- In office 1835–1835
- Preceded by: Benjamin T. Pickman
- Succeeded by: Horace Mann

Member of the Massachusetts State Senate

Personal details
- Born: November 16, 1793 Springfield, Massachusetts, U.S.
- Died: April 19, 1873 (aged 79) Springfield, Massachusetts, U.S.
- Party: Anti-Jackson; Whig; Republican
- Spouse: Mary Dwight (m. 1825, died)
- Children: 3
- Profession: Politician; lawyer; railroad executive

George Bliss (November 16, 1793 – April 19, 1873) was an American lawyer, politician and railroad executive. He served as Speaker of the Massachusetts House of Representatives and President of the Massachusetts Senate.

== Early life ==
George Bliss was born on November 16, 1793, at his parents' home on Main Street in Springfield, Massachusetts, to Hannah (née Clark) and George Bliss. His father was a lawyer, politician and graduate of Yale College. His maternal and paternal grandfathers Dr. John Clark and judge Moses Bliss were both Yale College graduates. His mother died when he was one year old and his father remarried twice. Bliss attended public schools in Springfield until the age of 13. He graduated from Yale College in 1812. Following graduation, Bliss entered his father's law office to study law. He was admitted to the law in September 1815.

== Career ==
During the War of 1812, Bliss served for nine weeks as an aide to General Jacob Bliss of the Massachusetts State Militia during the defense of Boston. He then served as brigade and division inspector of the state militia. Following the war, he attained the rank of lieutenant colonel. He started a law practice in Monson in 1815 and remained there until September 1822, when he moved back to Springfield. Bliss had declined invitations from Isaac C. Bates and Elijah H. Mills to form law practices, but in 1822 he started Dwight & Bliss, a law practice with Jonathan Dwight Jr. in Springfield.

Bliss was originally affiliated with the anti-Jackson Party and later associated with the Whig Party. In 1827, Bliss became a member of the Massachusetts House of Representatives. He was re-elected in 1828. He passed legislation that established boards of county commissioners and defining their duties. This new system of government replaced the old town system. He served as chairman of a special committee that saw through this new law.

Bliss was a member and president of the Massachusetts State Senate in 1835. While senate president, he served as chairman of a joint committee, including house speaker Julius Rockwell to examine and revise statutes in the state code. In 1838, he was re-elected to the Massachusetts House of Representatives. He served on a house committee that discussed the "fifteen gallon law" about liquor licenses. Bliss was in favor of temperance. He served as a member of the Governor's Council of Governor George N. Briggs from 1848 to 1849. During the 1852 presidential election, he served as an elector-at-large and cast his vote for Winfield Scott. He returned as a member and served as house speaker of the Massachusetts House of Representatives in 1853. Later in life, he was affiliated with the Republican Party.

From January 1836 to February 1842, excluding one year, Bliss served as general agent of the Western Railroad (later named the Boston and Albany Railroad). He oversaw the surveying between Worcester and Albany in 1836 and helped plan and organize the development of the railroad. From 1842 to 1843, he served as president of the railroad, succeeding Thomas B. Wales. He succeeded Wales again in 1844 and served until February 1846. While president in 1845, he directed the first dividends paid by the company. From May 1846 to September 1847, he and his wife toured Europe, including Great Britain, Ireland and Italy. After his return, he worked with New York Governor Washington Hunt to purchase the Erie and Kalamazoo Railroad. The railroad was leased to the Michigan Southern Railway in 1849 and Bliss served as director of the line. By 1850, he became president of the Michigan Southern Railway. He remained in the role until his resignation in June 1852 when the line had expanded to Chicago. From 1853 to December 1854, he was president of Chicago and Mississippi Railroad, overseeing its expansion from Joliet, Illinois, to Alton, Illinois. In 1857, he served again as director of the Michigan Southern Railway and was president from 1858 to May 1860, when he retired. He was an originator of the Hartford and Springfield Railroad and was director of the Chicago, Rock Island and Pacific Railroad. In 1863, he published Historical Memoir of the Western Railroad.

== Personal life ==
Bliss married Mary Dwight, daughter of his law partner in April 1825. They had three children, including George and Sarah. His wife predeceased him. Bliss was associated with Dr. Osgood's parish church until his marriage, then he was associated with the Unitarian church. Following his marriage, he lived in a house he built on Chestnut Street in Springfield. He donated US$10,000 to the city library in Springfield.

Bliss died on April 19, 1873, at his home in Springfield.

Massachusetts Senate
| Preceded by Benjamin T. Pickman | President of the Massachusetts Senate; 1835 | Succeeded by Horace Mann |
Massachusetts House of Representatives
| Preceded by Nathaniel Prentice Banks | Speaker of the Massachusetts House of Representatives; 1853 | Succeeded by Otis Phillips Lord |
