= 1854 Massachusetts legislature =

American state legislature

75th Massachusetts General Court
←	74th	76th	→

Overview
- Legislative body: General Court

Senate
- President: Charles Edward Cook

House
- Members: 310
- Speaker: Otis P. Lord

Sessions
- 1st: January 4, 1854 – April 29, 1854

The 75th Massachusetts General Court, consisting of the Massachusetts Senate and the Massachusetts House of Representatives, met in 1854 during the governorship of Emory Washburn. Charles Edward Cook served as president of the Senate and Otis P. Lord served as speaker of the House.

Notable legislation included incorporation of the Massachusetts Emigrant Aid Company and funding for a "project to build a railroad tunnel through Hoosac Mountain that cost state taxpayers more than $10 million and took 21 years to complete."

== Senators ==
- Samuel D. Parker

== Representatives ==
- Levi A. Abbott
- John Adams
- Paul Adams
- Albert K. Albee
- Benjamin Allen
- Zenas Allen
- Josiah Allis
- George H. Allyn
- Albert Amsden
- Isaac A. Anthony
- Daniel Ayer
- Albert Bacon
- Charles Baker
- George M. Baker
- Charles Bangs
- Frederick Barden
- Gilbert Barker
- Baxter Barnes
- David Barton
- William E. Bassett
- Jonathan B. Bates
- James H. Beal
- John Smith Bell
- Ezekiel Bemis
- Henry Wetherby Benchley
- Stephen R. Benton
- Thaddeus B. Bigelow
- John Blair
- Benjamin Blaney
- Albert Bliss
- Samuel Bliss
- Hiram Bosworth
- George P. Bowers
- Ebenezer Bradbury
- William H. Bradway
- Francis Brinley
- Charles Brown
- Henry F. Brown
- Hiram C. Brown
- Nehemiah Brown
- William Brown
- Amasa Bryant
- Thomas Buffum
- Robert I. Burbank
- Charles Burnett
- Theophilus Burr
- William Burrage
- Levi N. Campbell
- John Canon
- F. W. Carlton
- John C. Carr
- Joseph Carter
- Ezra Cary
- Henry H. Chamberlin
- Anthony K. Chase
- Josiah Childs
- LeBaron B. Church
- Otis Clapp
- Zenas Clapp
- Samuel Clark
- George Coburn
- Timothy V. Coburn
- Waldo Colburn
- Joseph S. Colby
- Sumner Cole
- Reuben Collins Jr.
- James D. Colt II
- Ithamar F. Conkey
- Elizur D. Cook
- William Cook
- George W. Cooley
- Albert Copeland
- William A. Crafts
- Samuel C. Cudworth
- Augustus N. Currier
- William E. Currier
- Simeon N. Cutler
- Joseph A. Dalton
- David Daniels
- John G. Davis
- Reuben Davis
- William Day Jr.
- Enos W. Dean
- Miles Demond
- Tilson B. Denham
- Hiram S. Denison
- William Denton
- Edward Dexter
- Charles Drew
- Henry W. Dwight
- Oliver Dwight
- Joseph Eames
- John P. Ellis
- Charles Emerson
- Benjamin Evans
- Leander Fales
- Timothy Farrar
- David Faulkner
- John A. Fitch
- Daniel Floyd
- Charles H. French
- Aaron Frost Jr.
- Benjamin Fry
- John E. Fry
- Andrew L. Fuller
- Henry Fuller
- Nelson Gardner
- Thomas J. Gardner
- John S. Gaskell
- William Gaston
- Nathaniel Gilbert
- George W. Gill
- John A. Goodwin
- Jason Gorham
- Richard Gould
- Dalton Goulding
- Alpheus C. Grant
- Charles E. Grant
- James D. Green
- Josiah W. Griswold
- Chester Guild
- James Guild
- Franklin Hall
- Hiram Hall
- Joseph P. Hall
- William P. Hamblin
- Levi Hammond
- Edward Hamond
- George Haskell
- Ira Haskell
- Josiah Haven
- Benjamin Hawkes
- Samuel Hawkes
- Leander Haynes
- William Henshaw
- Hiram S. Hollister
- John S. Holmes
- Daniel Holt
- James M. Hood
- Charles Howard
- Peter P. Howe
- Henry Howell
- Eben Howes
- John P. Hubbard
- Roswell Hubbard
- Willard A. Humphrey
- David Ingraham
- Elisha M. Ingram
- Stephen B. Ives
- Elias Jacobs
- Justin A. Jacobs
- Samuel H. Jenks
- John Jewett
- Henry Jones
- Aaron Josselyn
- Willard Judd
- Robert Keith
- George Kendall
- Oliver S. Kendall
- John Kenrick
- Ensign Kimball
- Barzillai King
- James P. King
- George Kingman
- Benjamin Kingsbury
- Daniel Kinsley
- Henry W. Kinsman
- William Knight
- Samuel B. Krogman
- Charles R. Ladd
- Edward Lamb
- John A. Lamson
- John Lane
- Job G. Lawton Jr.
- Addison Leach
- Amos Lefavor
- Thomas Lewis II
- Winslow Lewis
- Gilbert Lincoln
- Samuel E. Lloyd
- Henry A. Longley
- Otis P. Lord
- Jonathan Lyman
- Lemuel P. Lyman
- Alonzo V. Lynde
- George R. Marchant
- Ephraim Mayhew Jr.
- Leonard Millard
- William Miller
- William Mixter
- Loman A. Moody
- David Moore
- Horatio Moore
- David C. Murdock
- Hiel Nichols
- Richard Nutter
- Asa R. Nye
- Willard Nye
- Benjamin Paine
- Horatio G. Parker
- Horatio Peck
- William D. Peck
- Almond T. Pierce
- Israel Pierce
- Lewis Pierce
- Samuel H. Pierce
- Henry Plimpton
- George H. Plummer
- Benjamin Pond
- Benjamin Poole
- Philip P. Potter
- Parley J. Prindle
- Jonathan S. Purple
- Benjamin C. Putnam
- Philemon Putnam
- Calvin Reed
- Jason Reed
- Sampson Reed
- Abraham W. Rice
- Otis Rich
- Edward Richards
- Robert Richardson
- Andrew A. Richmond
- Joseph D. Roberts
- Dexter Roby
- Solomon L. Russell
- Thomas H. Russell
- Richard Sampson
- Baylies Sanford
- Ralph Sanger
- Benjamin W. Seamans
- William Sears
- John M. Seeley
- Charles C. Sewell
- Samuel A. Shackford
- William Shattuck
- Ebenezer Shaw
- John H. Sheppard
- Jervis Shove
- Mark A. Slocum
- Abner M. Smith
- Benjamin Smith
- John Smith
- John Smith
- John Derby Smith
- Oliver Smith II
- Samuel Smith
- Jonathan Snow
- John Souther
- Edward Southworth
- Ira Spalding
- Thomas H. Spencer
- Samuel W. Spooner
- James R. Sproat
- Perley Stevens
- Solon Stevens
- Plenry G. Stewart
- Joseph Stone
- Samuel H. Stowell
- James Stratton
- Lyman J. Strickland
- Josiah Swain
- Van R. Swift
- Milo Tallmadge
- George Taylor
- Eli Thayer
- Henry F. Thomas
- Newell A. Thompson
- John G. Thurston
- Elisha Tillson
- David Tilton
- Warren Tilton
- James Townsend
- John M. Tuttle
- Samuel J. Tuttle
- Jacob Ulman
- Marshall S. Underwood
- Nathan Vincent
- Edwin Walden
- Bradford L. Wales
- Thornton K. Ware
- Oliver Warner
- Park Warner
- William Warner
- John Warren
- W. R. P. Washburn
- William B. Washburn
- William A. Webber
- Abner S. Webster
- Charles A. Wells
- Noah Wells
- Daniel Wetherbee
- Moses H. Wetherbee
- Jonathan W. Wheeler
- James S. Whitney
- Joseph Whitney
- James S. Wiggin
- Alfred G. Williams
- J. Otis Williams
- Milo Wilson
- Albert Winn
- John C. Wolcott
- Amos Wood
- David Wood
- Joseph T. Wood
- Nathaniel Wood
- Albert J. Wright
- Asahel B. Wright
- David Wright

== See also ==
- 1854 Massachusetts gubernatorial election
- 33rd United States Congress
- List of Massachusetts General Courts
