= 1857 Massachusetts legislature =

American state legislature

78th Massachusetts General Court
←	77th	79th	→

Overview
- Legislative body: General Court

Senate
- Members: 40
- President: Charles Wentworth Upham

House
- Members: 357
- Speaker: Charles A. Phelps

Sessions
- 1st: January 7, 1857 – May 30, 1857 + extra session

The 78th Massachusetts General Court, consisting of the Massachusetts Senate and the Massachusetts House of Representatives, met in 1857 during the governorship of Henry Gardner. Charles Wentworth Upham served as president of the Senate and Charles A. Phelps served as speaker of the House.

There were 395 men in the combined house and senate, with the following occupations:

"farmers and horticulturists, 77; merchants, 65; lawyers, 33; shoe manufacturers, 31; manufacturers, 29; clergymen, 13; physicians and housewrights, 12 each, 24; teachers, 10; master mariners, 9; lumber dealers and clerks, 6 each, 12; editors and shipwrights, 5 each, 10; blacksmiths, druggists and publishers, 4 each, 12; bakers, carriage makers, paper makers, sail makers, and grain dealers, 3 each, 16; cabinet makers, chair makers, clothiers, civil engineers, conveyancers, gentlemen, ship joiners, printers, tin plate workers, machinists, 2 each; 20; auctioneer, axe maker, auger and bitt maker, butcher, broker, balance maker, book-binder, book-keeper, book-seller, calico printer, dentist, engineer, forwarding agent, gilder, iron founder, hotel keeper, leather and hides, land surveyor, law student, reporter, provision dealer, manufacturer of cotton, silk and safes, real estate dealer, pianoforte maker, friction match, shuttle maker, bonnet maker, tanner, ship builder, tailor, mechanic, ship chandler, painter, 1 each, 35."

== Senators ==
- O. W. Albee
- Oliver Ames Jr.
- John W. Atwood
- John Batehelder
- Gad O. Bliss
- Arthur P. Bonney
- William S. Brakenridge
- Robert I. Burbank
- Asaph Churchill
- Benjamin C. Clark
- John Cowdin
- Constantiue C. Esty
- Matthew D. Field
- Hugh W. Greene
- Benj. W. Harris
- Gideon Haynes
- J. F. Hitchcock
- George F. Hoar
- Caleb D. Hunking
- John M. Merrick
- George W. Messinger
- Jacob Mitchell
- William Mixter
- Eben S. Poor
- Henry B. Rogers
- Henry L. Sabin
- Ezekiel R. Sawin
- John H. Shaw
- Eben F. Stone
- Charles F. Swift
- Velorous Taft
- William Taylor
- John N. Turner
- Charles W. Upham
- James M. Usher
- Oliver Warner
- Aza. B. Wheeler
- Joseph White
- Ohio Whitney Jr.
- Jeremiah S. Young

== Representatives ==
- Thaddeus Allen

== See also ==
- 35th United States Congress
- List of Massachusetts General Courts
