= 1835 Massachusetts legislature =

American state legislature

56th Massachusetts General Court
←	55th	57th	→

Overview
- Legislative body: General Court

Senate
- Members: 40
- President: Benjamin T. Pickman, George Bliss

House
- Members: 615
- Speaker: Julius Rockwell

Sessions
- 1st: January 7, 1835 – April 8, 1835
- 2nd: September 2, 1835 – November 4, 1835

The 56th Massachusetts General Court, consisting of the Massachusetts Senate and the Massachusetts House of Representatives, met in 1835 during the governorship of John Davis. Benjamin T. Pickman and George Bliss served as presidents of the Senate. Julius Rockwell served as speaker of the House.

== Senators ==
- Charles Allen
- Nathaniel Austin
- Abel Bliss
- George Bliss
- Elihu Cutter
- Franklin Dexter
- William Ferson
- Waldo Flint
- John C. Gray
- Ephraim Hastings
- Isaac L. Hedge
- Chas. Hudson
- Samuel H. Jenks
- Jesse Kimball
- Myron Lawrence
- George Lunt
- Horace Mann
- Charles Marston
- Samuel Merrill
- Daniel Messenger
- Theron Metcalf
- Samuel Mixter
- Henry J. Oliver
- Benjamin T. Pickman
- William Porter, Jr.
- John P. Robinson
- Benjamin Rodman
- Chas. Russell
- Daniel Shattuck
- Henry Shaw
- John A. Shaw
- Jonathan Shove
- William A. F. Sproat
- J. C. Starkweather
- Allen Tillinghast
- George A. Tufts
- Elijah Vose
- Joseph G. Waters
- Sidney Willard
- Eliphalet Williams

== Representatives ==
- Samuel Aspinwall

== See also ==
- 24th United States Congress
- List of Massachusetts General Courts
