= 1847 Massachusetts legislature =

American state legislature

68th Massachusetts General Court
←	67th	69th	→

Overview
- Legislative body: General Court

Senate
- Members: 40
- President: William B. Calhoun

House
- Members: 255
- Speaker: Ebenezer Bradbury

Sessions
- 1st: January 6, 1847 – April 16, 1847

The 68th Massachusetts General Court, consisting of the Massachusetts Senate and the Massachusetts House of Representatives, met in 1847 during the governorship of George N. Briggs. William B. Calhoun served as president of the Senate and Ebenezer Bradbury served as speaker of the House.

Notable legislation included the anti-abortion "Act To Suppress Injurious Publications". Notable resolutions included opposition to the Mexican–American War.

== Senators ==
- Joseph Avery
- Thomas P. Beal
- George T. Bigelow
- Nathaniel B. Borden
- Thomas A. Bowen
- Nahum F. Bryant
- Joseph T. Buckingham
- William B. Calhoun
- Thomas G. Cary
- James Clark
- Dennis Condry
- George Denny
- Thomas Emerson
- William T. Eustis
- Z. Field
- Barnabas Freeman
- Jason Goulding
- John C. Gray
- James Gregory
- Samuel Guild
- David Heard
- George Hodges
- Samuel A. Hurlburt
- John A. Knowles
- Forbes Kyle
- John W. Lowe
- James Maguire
- Jonathan C. Perkins
- Chauncy B. Rising
- Stephen Salisbury
- Ezekiel Sawin
- Zeno Scudder
- Calvin Shepard
- Silas Shepard
- Hobart Spencer
- Levi Taylor
- Leavitt Thaxter
- Welcome Young

== Representatives ==
- William T. Andrews

== See also ==
- 30th United States Congress
- List of Massachusetts General Courts
