= 1848 Massachusetts legislature =

American state legislature

69th Massachusetts General Court
←	68th	70th	→

Overview
- Legislative body: General Court

Senate
- Members: 40
- President: Zeno Scudder

House
- Members: 272
- Speaker: Francis Crowninshield

Sessions
- 1st: January 5, 1848 – May 10, 1848 + extra session

The 69th Massachusetts General Court, consisting of the Massachusetts Senate and the Massachusetts House of Representatives, met in 1848 during the governorship of George N. Briggs. Zeno Scudder served as president of the Senate and Francis Crowninshield served as speaker of the House.

== Senators ==
- Charles H. Balch
- Joseph Bell
- C. Bellows
- George T. Bigelow
- Jonathan Blake
- Thomas Bradley
- John Brooks
- Nahum F. Bryant
- Joseph T. Buckingham
- James Clark
- Truman Clark
- George Copeland
- George Denny
- Charles Devens, Jr.
- James C. Doane
- William T. Eustis
- Alfred D. Foster
- O. C. Fowler
- John Z. Goodrich
- James Gregory
- E. J. M. Hale
- Alanson Hamilton
- David Heard
- Hosea Ilsley
- William James
- Cromwell Leonard
- John W. Lowe
- Albert H. Nelson
- Edward Parsons
- Jonathan C. Perkins
- W. Phelps
- Charles H. Plunket
- Ezekiel Sawin
- Zeno Scudder
- Calvin Shepard
- David A. Simmons
- Levi Taylor
- Tappan Wentworth
- William H. Wood
- E. Munroe Wright

== Representatives ==
=== Essex County ===
- William Stevens
- Asa A. Abbott
- William H. Lovett
- Paul Hildreth
- Elijah W. Upton
- Joshua Silvester
- Levi Patch
- Bemjamin Page
- Alfred M. Farley

== Significant events ==
The 1848 Massachusetts legislature is marked the culmination of Horace Mann's work in public education.

== See also ==
- 30th United States Congress
- List of Massachusetts General Courts
