= 1849 Massachusetts legislature =

American state legislature

70th Massachusetts General Court
←	69th	71st	→

Overview
- Legislative body: General Court

Senate
- Members: 40
- President: Joseph M. Bell

House
- Members: 263
- Speaker: Francis Crowninshield

Sessions
- 1st: January 3, 1849 – May 2, 1849

The 70th Massachusetts General Court, consisting of the Massachusetts Senate and the Massachusetts House of Representatives, met in 1849 during the governorship of George N. Briggs. Joseph M. Bell served as president of the Senate and Francis Crowninshield served as speaker of the House.

== Senators ==
- Chester Adams
- E. D. Ammidown
- Daniel C. Baker
- Charles H. Balch
- Joseph Bell
- Jonathan Blake
- Joseph S. Borland
- John Brooks
- A. H. Bullock
- George Copeland
- George W. Crockett
- Charles Devens, Jr.
- James C. Doane
- William R. Easton
- Otis P. Ford
- Joel Giles
- John Z. Goodrich
- E. J. M. Hale
- Lewis Harding
- N. W. Hazen
- Hosea Ilsley
- William James
- John Jenkins
- John S. Keyes
- Aaron King
- Cyrus Kingman
- Cromwell Leonard
- Albert H. Nelson
- Edward Parsons
- William A. Phelps
- Jonathan Preston
- James Rider
- John Sargent
- David A. Simmons
- Hobart Spencer
- Ebenezer Torrey
- Philander Washburn
- Tappan Wentworth
- Paul Whitin
- E. M. Wright

== Representatives ==
- Elisha H. Allen
- John Boles
- Osmyn Brewster
- William Brigham
- Walter Bryent
- Henry G. Clark
- Nathaniel W. Coffin
- Charles Edward Cook
- William D. Coolidge
- F. B. Crowninshield
- Benjamin R. Curtis
- William Denton
- William Eaton
- James Fowle
- William Freeman
- John C. Gray
- John P. Healey
- Samuel H. Jenks
- Lewis Jones
- Sewall Kendall
- Samuel Leeds
- J. Lothrop Motley
- Samuel S. Perkins
- John L. Phillips
- Benj. P. Richardson
- Richard Robins
- Philo Sanford
- William Schouler
- Lemuel Shattuck
- Southworth Shaw
- Benjamin Smith
- Richard Soule Jr.
- Noah Sturtevant
- Thomas Tarbell
- John W. Warren Jr.
- Charles S. Cary
- Asa A. Abbott
- Paul Hildreth
- William H. Lovett
- Enoch Wood
- William Dodge Jr.
- William Wolcott
- Simon P. Burnham
- David Chard
- Joseph Friend
- Joseph Wait
- Stephen Story
- John Carroll Jr.
- Thomas Swasey
- John Tenney
- Jacob Atkinson
- Dennis Condry
- Ralph C. Huse
- Henry W. Kinsman
- John Proctor
- Eleazer M. Dalton
- Henry Russell
- Joshua Safford
- Augustus Story
- John D Symonds
- Charles W. Upham
- Joshua M. Pike Jr.
- Charles Herrick
- Amos Gould

== See also ==
- 31st United States Congress
- List of Massachusetts General Courts
