= Henry Scudder =

Henry Scudder may refer to:

- Henry Austin Scudder (1819-1892), American state legislator from Massachusetts
- Henry J. Scudder (1825–1886), American representative from New York
- Henry Scudder (priest) (died 1659), English Presbyterian
- Henry Martyn Scudder (1822–1895), American missionary to Japan and South India
