= Daniel C. Eddy =

American politician (1823–1896)

Daniel Clarke Eddy
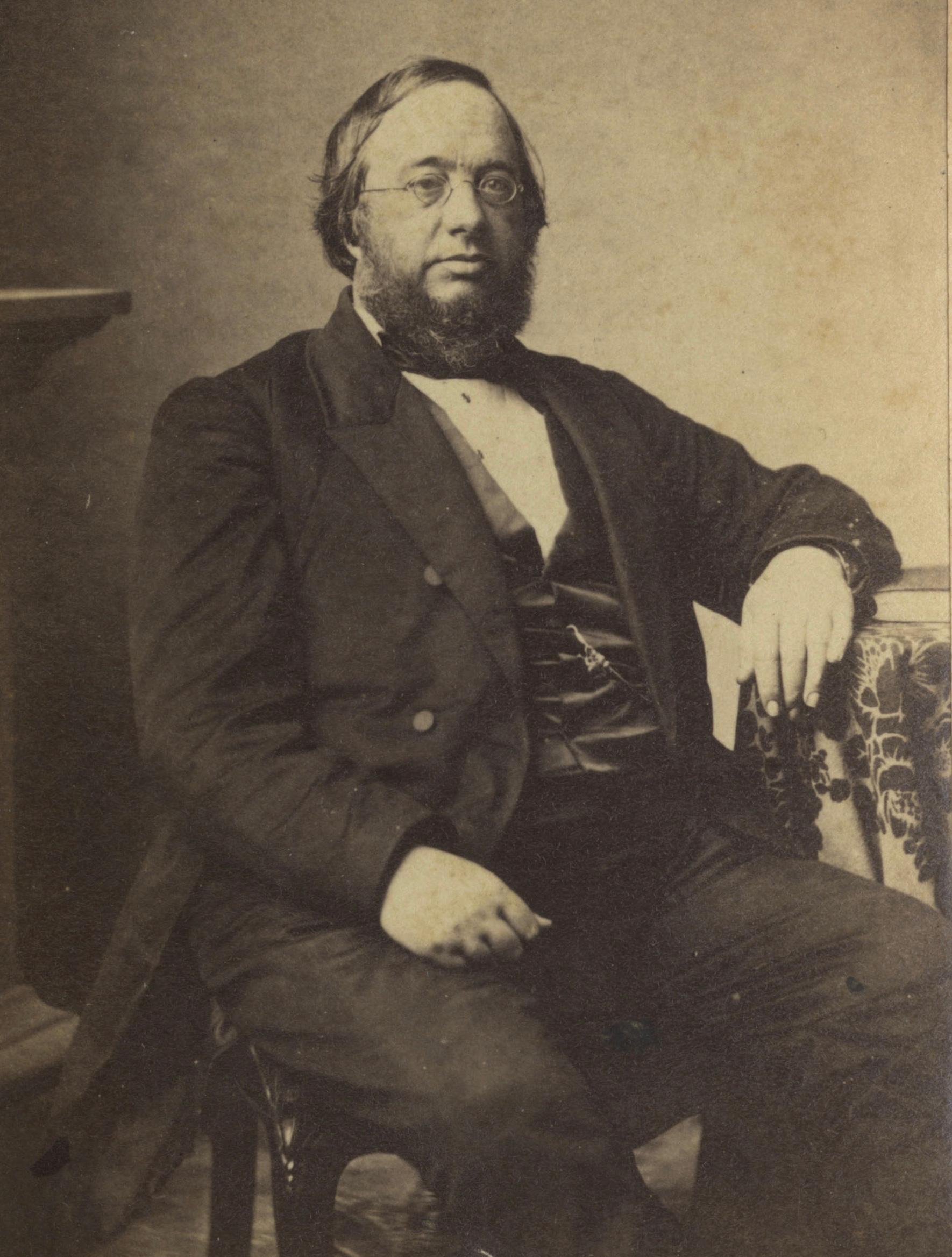

Speaker of the Massachusetts House of Representatives

Doctor (honorary)
- Preceded by: Otis P. Lord
- Succeeded by: Charles A. Phelps

Member of the Massachusetts House of Representatives
- In office 1855–1855

Personal details
- Born: May 21, 1823 Salem, Massachusetts
- Died: July 26, 1896 (aged 73) Brooklyn, New York
- Party: Know Nothing
- Education: Hampton Theological Institution, 1845
- Alma mater: Hampton Theological Institution
- Occupation: Writer
- Profession: Minister, ordained Baptist 1846

Daniel Clarke Eddy (May 21, 1823 – July 26, 1896) was an American clergyman, hymn writer, politician, and author, who in 1855 served as a member, and as the Speaker, of the Massachusetts House of Representatives.

He was the author of The Young Woman's Friend; or the Duties, Trials, Love, Hopes of Woman (1857), in which he argued that women ought to be taught subjects usually only taught to men, including political economy, the sciences, and the practical and theoretical applications of religion, primarily on the basis that women should understand these subjects to be able to educate their sons. He also wrote The Young Man's Friend, the first edition of which sold 10,000 copies.

== Selected works ==
=== Novels ===
- The Young Man's Friend. Dayton and Wentworth. 1855. (1st series, Lowell, 1849; 2d series, Boston, 1859)
  - "Reviewed Work: The Young Man's Friend; Containing Admonitions for the Erring, Counsel for the Tempted, Encouragement for the Desponding, and Hope for the Fallen". The North American Review. 102 (211): 606–09. 1866. JSTOR 25107934.
- "The Burman Apostle" (Lowell, 1850)
- "Europa," a book of words (1851)
- "The Percy Family" (5 vols., 1852)
- "Waiter's Tour in the East " (6 vols., Boston, 1861)
- Heroines of the Missionary Enterprise. Ticknor, Reed, and Fields. 1850.
- The Angels' Whispers; or, Echoes of Spirit Voices, Designed to Console the Mourning. Walter Scott. 1885 [1852].
- "City Side" (1854)
- "Young Woman's Friend" (1855)
- "Waiting at the Cross" (Boston, 1859)

=== Travel writings ===
- Eddy's Travels in Asia and Africa. Boston: Brown, 1893
- Eddy's Travels in Europe. Boston: Brown, 1893.
- Europe; or, Scenes and Society in England, France, Italy, and Switzerland 1859.

=== Hymns ===
- God Is the Seamen's Friend
- God of Nations, Let Salvation Sound
- Sailor Speed Thee o'er the Sea
- We Dedicate to Thee

Massachusetts House of Representatives
Preceded by Otis P. Lord	Speaker of the Massachusetts House of Representatives; 1855	Succeeded by Charles A. Phelps

== See also ==
- 76th Massachusetts General Court (1855)
