= 1859 Massachusetts legislature =

American state legislature

80th Massachusetts General Court
←	79th	81st	→

Overview
- Legislative body: General Court
- Election: November 2, 1858

Senate
- Members: 40
- President: Charles A. Phelps
- Party control: Republican

House
- Members: 240
- Speaker: Charles Hale
- Party control: Republican

Sessions
- 1st: January 5, 1859 – April 6, 1859

The 80th Massachusetts General Court, consisting of the Massachusetts Senate and the Massachusetts House of Representatives, met in 1859 during the governorship of Nathaniel Prentice Banks. Charles A. Phelps served as president of the Senate and Charles Hale served as speaker of the House.

"In 1858 the Republicans took a firm grip on both branches of the Legislature electing 34 Senate members as against two Democrats and four other. The House went Republican by the widest margin ever with 314 Republicans and but three Democrats."

== Senators ==
- John W. Atwood
- John W. Bacon
- Aaron Bagg
- Abraham M. Bigelow
- Samuel W. Bowerman
- Nehemiah Boynton
- John Branning
- George M. Brooks
- Benjamin F. Butler
- Horace Conn
- Joseph W. Cornell
- Homer M. Daggett
- George L. Davis
- Robert T. Davis
- William T. Davis
- Benjamin Evans
- William Fabens
- Charles Field
- Milton M. Fisher
- Charles A. French
- Oliver Frost
- Davis Goddard
- Carver Hotchkiss
- Horatio G. Knight
- Ichabod N. Luce
- John G. Metcalf
- E. L. Norton
- George Odiorne
- Joseph B. F. Osgood
- Dexter F. Parker
- Edward G. Parker
- William B. Peek
- Charles A. Phelps
- Thomas P. Rich
- Ezekiel K. Sawin
- Perez Simmons
- Warren Tilton
- William Upham
- George Walker
- J. M. S. Williams

== See also ==
- 36th United States Congress
- List of Massachusetts General Courts
