= John D. Smith (disambiguation) =

John D. Smith is a former professor of Sanskrit at Cambridge.

John D. Smith may also refer to:

- John David Smith (Upper Canada politician)
- John David Smith (Ontario politician)
- John Day Smith (1845–1933), American lawyer and politician
- John Smith (basketball, born 1969) (John David Smith), American college basketball coach
- John Smith (rugby league) (John David Smith), New Zealand rugby league player
- John Derek Smith (1924–2003), British biologist
- John Donnell Smith (1829–1928), American biologist
- John Douglas Smith (born 1966), Canadian sound editor
- John Donald Smith (1919–1997), Canadian politician in the Legislative Assembly of British Columbia
- John Derby Smith (1812–1884), minister, physician, and Massachusetts state legislator
