= 1855 Massachusetts gubernatorial election =

- November 6, 1855
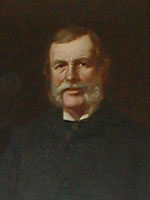

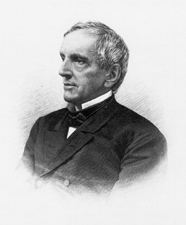

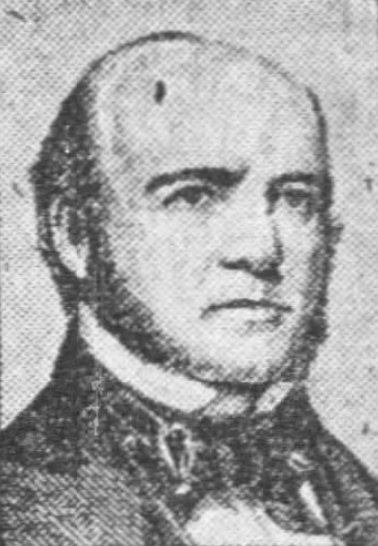
Nominee	Henry J. Gardner	Julius Rockwell
Party	Know Nothing	Republican
Popular vote	51,497	36,715
Percentage	37.73%	26.90%
Nominee	Erasmus Beach	Samuel H. Walley
Party	Democratic	Whig
Popular vote	34,728	13,296
Percentage	25.44%	9.74%
- County results Gardner: 30–40% 40–50% 50–60% Rockwell: 30–40% 40–50% Beach: 30–40% Walley: 40–50%
Governor before election
Henry J. Gardner
Know Nothing
Elected Governor
Henry J. Gardner
Know Nothing

The 1855 Massachusetts gubernatorial election was held on November 6. Know-Nothing candidate Henry J. Gardner was re-elected to a second term as Governor in a multi-partisan race, defeating Republican Julius Rockwell and Democrat Erasmus Beach.

This was the first election won by a direct plurality vote, after the majority requirement was abolished by the legislature on May 23. Gardner won without ratification by the General Court.

== General election ==
=== Candidates ===
- Erasmus Beach, former state senator from Springfield (Democratic)
- Henry J. Gardner, incumbent governor (Native American)
- Julius Rockwell, interim U.S. senator (1854–55) (Republican)
- Samuel H. Walley, U.S. representative from Roxbury (Whig)

=== Results ===
1855 Massachusetts gubernatorial election
Party	Candidate	Votes	%	±%
Know Nothing	Henry J. Gardner (incumbent)	51,497	37.73%	▼24.85
Republican	Julius Rockwell	36,715	26.90%	▲21.92
Democratic	Erasmus D. Beach	34,728	25.44%	▲14.89
Whig	Samuel H. Walley	13,296	9.74%	▼11.20
Scattering	All others	252	0.19%	▼0.03
Total votes		136,488	100.00%	
Know Nothing hold		Swing		

== See also ==
- 1855 Massachusetts legislature
