= 1855 Massachusetts legislature =

American state legislature

76th Massachusetts General Court
←	75th	77th	→

Overview
- Legislative body: General Court

Senate
- Members: 40
- President: Henry Wetherby Benchley
- Party control: Know-Nothing

House
- Members: 380
- Speaker: Daniel C. Eddy
- Party control: Know-Nothing

Sessions
- 1st: January 3, 1855 – May 21, 1855

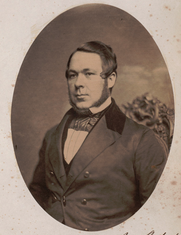
Henry Benchley, Senate president.

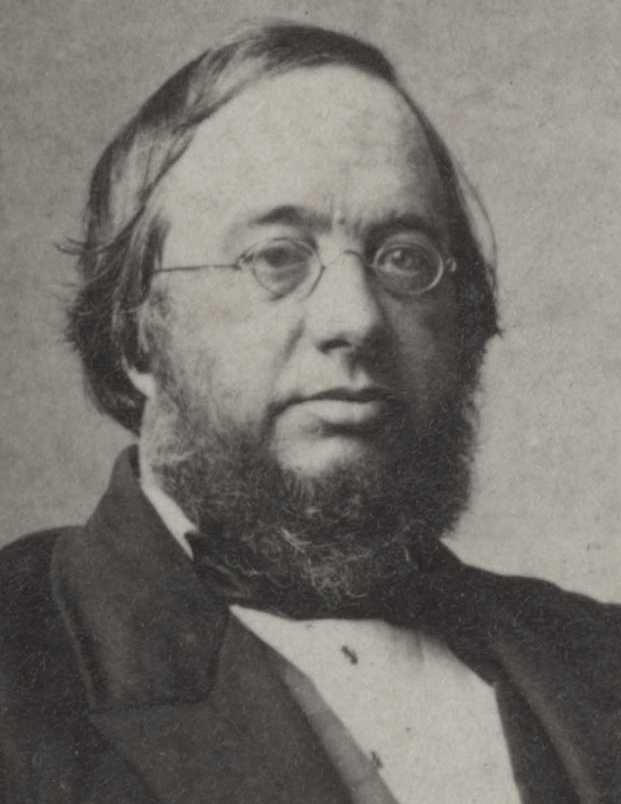
Daniel Eddy, House speaker.

Leaders of the Massachusetts General Court, 1855.

The 76th Massachusetts General Court, consisting of the Massachusetts Senate and the Massachusetts House of Representatives, met in 1855 during the governorship of Henry Gardner. Henry Wetherby Benchley served as president of the Senate and Daniel C. Eddy served as speaker of the House.

"Know-Nothings won all 40 state Senate seats and all but three of the 379 state House seats in 1854, in addition to the governorship.... Once in power, the Know-Nothings passed legislation to deport poor or mentally ill Irish residents; to 'inspect' Catholic schools and convents; and to order daily readings from the Protestant Bible in public schools."

On May 9, 1855, Joseph Hiss became the first Massachusetts state representative to be expelled from the House.

== Notable legislation ==
This legislature passed the nation's first statute racially integrating public education.

== Senators ==
- O. W. Albee
- Erastus Andrews
- Elihu C. Baker
- Lemuel M. Barker
- John Batchelder
- Sylvester Baxter
- Henry W. Benchley
- James D. Black
- John A. Buttrick
- James E. Carpenter
- Albert A. Cook
- Joseph E. Dawley
- Edward Denny
- Francis DeWitt
- Streeter Evans
- Jabez Fisher
- William Fletcher
- Robert B. Hall
- Charles K. Hawks
- A. E. Hildreth
- David K. Hitchcock
- Stephen Huse
- Richard Libby
- Ivory H. Lucas
- Sebeus C. Maine
- Billings Palmer
- Bradford K. Peirce
- Gilbert Pillsbury
- Z. L. Raymond
- Andrew A. Richmond
- Simon W. Robinson
- Lewis L. Sellew
- Charles H. Stedman
- Moses Tenny, Jr.
- Alvan G. Underwood
- Ambrose Vincent
- James W. Ward
- Daniel Warren
- Benj. F. White
- Albert J. Wright

== See also ==
- 34th United States Congress
- List of Massachusetts General Courts
