= United States Customs District of Barnstable =

The United States Customs District of Barnstable was an administrative area for the collection of import duties on foreign goods that entered the United States by ship at the port of Barnstable, Massachusetts. Established in 1789, it was abolished in 1913. Today the port of Barnstable is administered by the Boston Customs District.

== History ==
The District of Barnstable was established in the fifth statute passed by the First Congress in 1789 (ch.5, 1 Stat. 30). This act provided for the collection of the duties that had been laid down in the Hamilton Tariff earlier that year. The town of Barnstable was designated as the port of entry for the district. The towns of Sandwich, Harwich, Wellfleet, Provincetown and Chatham were designated as ports of delivery only. The district included all shores and waters within the county of Barnstable, excepting the town of Falmouth. A collector for the district was appointed, to reside at Barnstable.

== Customs House ==
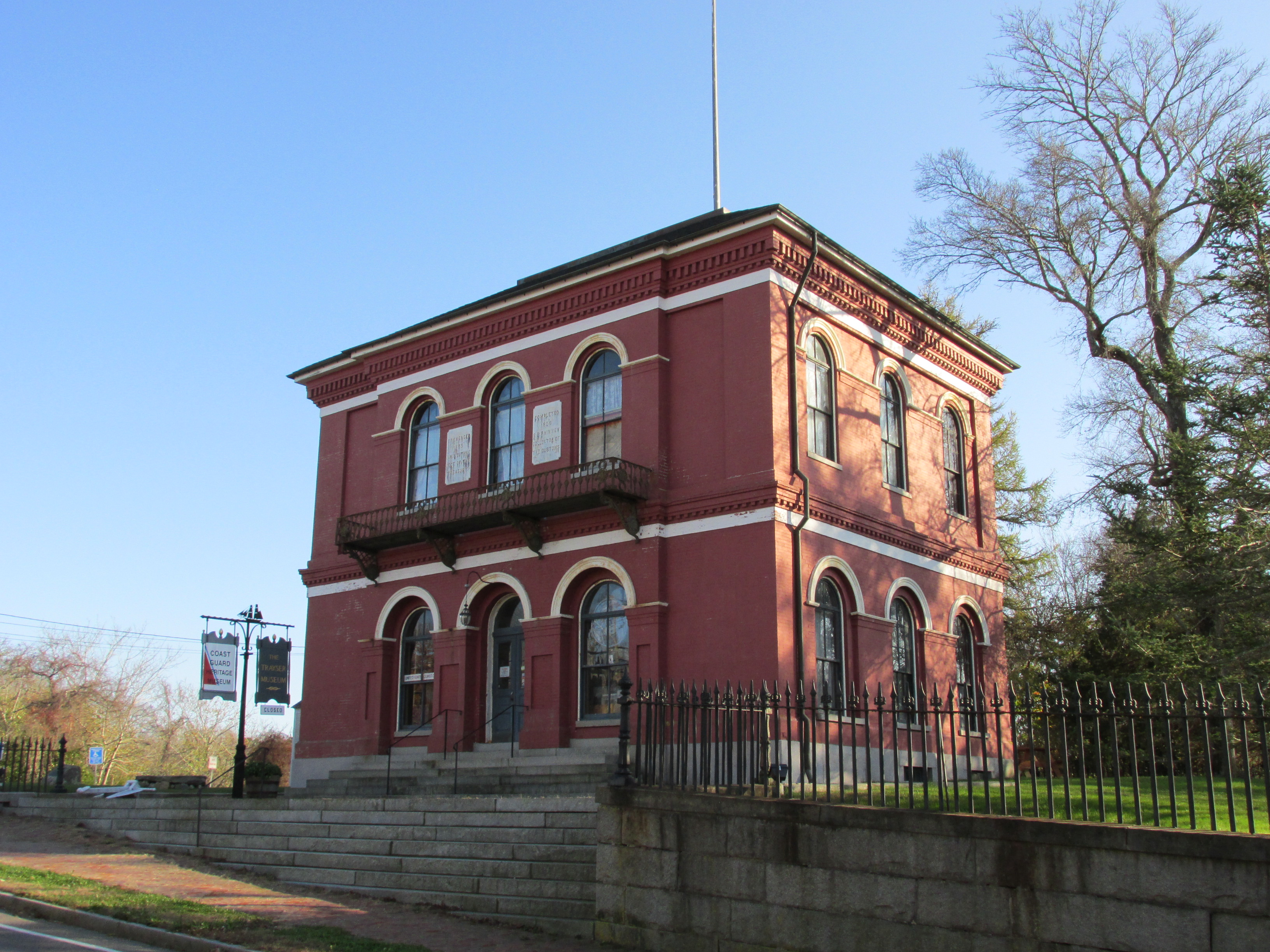
Customs House

Customs activities took place in the collector's home until the mid-19th century when collector Sylvanus B. Phinney secured congressional funding to erect a fireproof, brick and cast iron customshouse/post office in 1855. Ammi Burnham Young, Supervising Architect of the Treasury Department, designed the two-story, Renaissance Revival style building with an advanced cast-iron structural system in 1856. The customshouse occupied the second level until 1913, when Barnstable ceased to be a customs district in its own right. The first level continued to serve as a post office until 1958. The federal government deeded the building and grounds to the town of Barnstable in 1960 for use as a historical museum, which opened that same year. The building is dedicated to Donald G. Trayser, a local Barnstable historian, former editor of The Barnstable Patriot, former Clerk of the Barnstable Superior Court, and editor of Barnstable - Three Centuries of a Cape Cod Town, which was published in 1939. For many years, the historic building housed the collection of the Barnstable Historical Society. After the Society moved out, the customhouse was restored by a group of dedicated local residents and reopened as the Coast Guard Heritage Museum at the Trayser in July 2005.

== Officers ==
The position of collector was appointed by the President, subject to confirmation by the Senate. From 1820 onward, collectors were limited to four-year commissions, at the end of which they needed to be reappointed by the President. They could also be removed from office at any time at the pleasure of the President.

=== Collector for the District (1789 - 1913) ===
| Name | Entered office (Note: From 1820, collectors were appointed to four-year commission. The term of a collector may have expired for a short period before the new collector was confirmed, but the dates are shown as continuous.) | Left office | First Appointed By | Reason for Leaving Office |
|---|---|---|---|---|
| Joseph Otis | August 3, 1789 | February 7, 1809 | George Washington | ??? |
| William Otis (Note: William Otis was the son of the previous collector) | February 7, 1809 | January 21, 1814 | Thomas Jefferson | ??? |
| Isaiah L. Green | January 21, 1814 | March 3, 1837 | James Madison | Commission expired |
| Henry Crocker | March 3, 1837 | March 11, 1841 (Note: Crocker was renominated for another term by Martin van Buren but never confirmed.) | Andrew Jackson | Commission expired |
| Ebenezer Bacon | March 11, 1841 | March 11, 1845 | William Henry Harrison | Commission expired |
| Josiah Hinckley | March 11, 1845 | April 4, 1847 | James K. Polk | Removed by Polk |
| Sylvanus B. Phinney | April 4, 1847 (Note: Recess appointment. The date of taking up office is the date the recess appointment was made by the President, unless otherwise noted.) | June 10, 1849 | James K. Polk | Removed by Taylor |
| Ebenezer Bacon | June 10, 1849 | March 17, 1853 | Zachary Taylor | Removed by Pierce |
| Sylvanus B. Phinney | March 17, 1853 | July 1, 1861 | Franklin Pierce | Removed by Lincoln |
| Joseph M. Day | July 1, 1861 | November 12, 1861 | Abraham Lincoln | Resigned |
| Charles F. Swift | November 12, 1861 | November 11, 1866 | Abraham Lincoln | ??? |
| Sylvanus B. Phinney | November 11, 1866 | March 2, 1867 | Andrew Johnson | ??? |
| Charles F. Swift | March 2, 1867 | July 8, 1876 | Andrew Johnson | ??? |
| Franklin B. Goss | July 8, 1876 | August 8, 1887 | Ulysses S. Grant | ??? |
| Van Buren Chase | August 8, 1887 | August 1, 1889 | Grover Cleveland | ??? |
| Franklin B. Goss | August 1, 1889 | February 17, 1894 | Benjamin Harrison | ??? |
| Thomas C. Day | February 17, 1894 | January 20, 1898 | Grover Cleveland | Resigned |
| Thatcher T. Hallet | January 20, 1898 | July 1, 1913 | William McKinley | Post Abolished |
