= Charles W. Upham =

American politician (1802–1875)

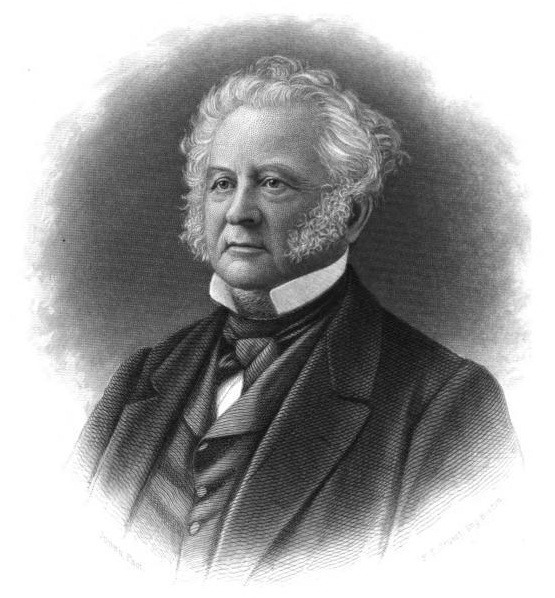

Member of the U.S. House of Representatives from Massachusetts's 6th district
- In office March 4, 1853 – March 3, 1855
- Preceded by: George T. Davis
- Succeeded by: Timothy Davis

7th Mayor of Salem, Massachusetts
- In office 1852–1853
- Preceded by: David Pingree
- Succeeded by: Asahel Huntington

Member of the Massachusetts House of Representatives for Essex
- In office 1849–1849
- In office 1859–1860

President of the Massachusetts Senate
- In office 1857–1858
- Preceded by: Elihu C. Baker
- Succeeded by: Charles A. Phelps

Member of the Massachusetts Constitutional Convention of 1853
- In office 1853–1853

Member of the Massachusetts Senate for Essex
- In office 1850–1850
- In office 1857–1858

Personal details
- Born: Charles Wentworth Upham; May 4, 1802 Saint John, New Brunswick Colony, British Canada
- Died: June 15, 1875 (aged 73) Salem, Massachusetts, U.S.
- Party: Whig, Free Soil, Republican
- Spouse: Ann Susan Holmes

Charles Wentworth Upham (May 4, 1802 – June 15, 1875) was a U.S. representative from Massachusetts. Upham was also a member and president of the Massachusetts State Senate, the 7th mayor of Salem, Massachusetts, and twice a member of the Massachusetts State House of Representatives. Upham was the cousin of George Baxter Upham and Jabez Upham. Upham was later a historian of Salem and the Salem Witch Trials of 1692 when he lived there.

== Biography ==
Charles Wentworth Upham was born in Saint John in the New Brunswick Colony of British Canada on May 4, 1802 to Col. Joshua Upham, Supreme Court Justice of New Brunswick, and his second wife Mary Chandler. Joshua Upham was born in Brookfield, MA in 1741 and died in England in 1808.

Charles W. Upham married Ann Susan Holmes on March 29, 1826. She was the daughter of Rev. Abiel Holmes and Sarah Oliver Wendell. Ann was the sister of Dr. Oliver Wendell Holmes Sr.

Charles and Ann had 15 children all born in Salem, Massachusetts. Four of their children survived to adulthood; Charles Wentworth Upham Jr. born in 1830 and died at the age of 30 in Buffalo, New York, married to Mary Haven, no children; William Phineas Upham born in 1836 and died in 1905, Newton, Massachusetts, married to Cynthia Bailey Nurse and had two daughters (Mary Wendell Upham and Elizabeth Upham); Sarah Wendell Upham born 1839 and died unmarried at 25; and Oliver Wendell Holmes Upham born in 1843 and died in 1905, Salem, Massachusetts, married to Caroline Ely Wilson, one daughter (Dorothy Quincy Upham, b. 1881) and one son (Charles Wentworth Upham, b. 1883).

He attended Harvard in the class of 1821, and was a member of the Porcellian Club. A classmate and former friend of Ralph Waldo Emerson, Upham was an opponent of the burgeoning Transcendentalism movement and later engineered for Nathaniel Hawthorne to be dismissed from his job at the Salem custom house. He also arranged for Jones Very to be institutionalized at McClean Asylum. Senator Charles Sumner once referred to Upham as "that smooth, smiling, oily man of God".

In 1858, Upham was elected a member of the American Antiquarian Society.

Upham died on June 15, 1875, in Salem, Massachusetts.

== See also ==
- 78th Massachusetts General Court (1857)
- 79th Massachusetts General Court (1858)

== Publications ==
- Life, Explorations and Public Services of John Charles Fremont. Ticknor and Fields, Boston, MA. 1856
- Salem Witchcraft with an account of Salem Village and a history of opinions on Witchcraft and Kindred Subjects. Frederick Unger, New York, 1978 (Reprint), 2 vv.
- "Salem Witchcraft and Cotton Mather A Reply". Morrisania, N.Y. 1869. Public Domain. Project Gutenberg free eBook.
- Lectures on Witchcraft Comprising a History of the Delusion in Salem in 1692 (1831) Kessinger Publishing (Reprint), 2003. ISBN 978-0-7661-8088-8
- A Discourse Delivered on the Sabbath After the Decease of the Hon. Timothy Pickering. Kessinger Publishing, United States, 2010 (Reprint). ISBN 978-1-163-74927-2
- Eulogy on the Life and Character of Zachary Taylor. BiblioLife, LLC, USA (Reprint), 2009. ISBN 978-1-117-40148-5
- Memoir of Francis Peabody, President of the Essex Institute. Pranava Books, 2008 (Reprinted on demand from 1868 edition.
- Letters on the Logos (1828) Kessinger Publishing, 2003 (Reprint). ISBN 978-0-7661-4679-2
- Life of Sir Henry Vane, Fourth Governor of Massachusetts in the Library of American Biography, conducted by Jared Sparks Vol IV.

== Notes ==
U.S. House of Representatives
Preceded by George T. Davis	Member of the U.S. House of Representatives from Massachusetts's 6th congressional district March 4, 1853 – March 3, 1855	Succeeded by Timothy Davis
