= William Reed (politician) =

American politician

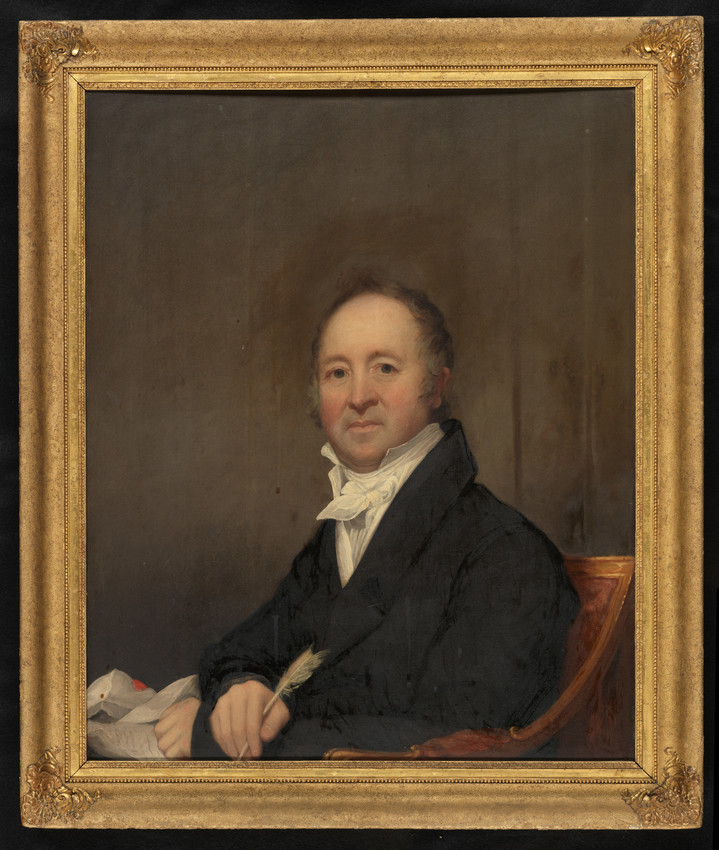

Member of the U.S. House of Representatives from Massachusetts's 2nd district
- In office March 4, 1811 – March 3, 1815
- Preceded by: Benjamin Pickman Jr.
- Succeeded by: Timothy Pickering

Personal details
- Born: June 6, 1776 Marblehead, Province of Massachusetts Bay, British America
- Died: February 18, 1837 (aged 60) Marblehead, Massachusetts, U.S.
- Party: Federalist

William Reed (June 6, 1776 – February 18, 1837) was a U.S. representative from Massachusetts.

Born in Marblehead in the Province of Massachusetts Bay, Reed received a limited education. He worked as a merchant.

Reed was elected as a Federalist to the Twelfth and Thirteenth Congresses (March 4, 1811 – March 3, 1815). He served as a member of the board of the Andover Theological Seminary. He was a Trustee of Dartmouth College, Hanover, New Hampshire.

He resumed work as a merchant. He died in Marblehead, Massachusetts, February 18, 1837, and bequest of funds to Dartmouth allowed the erection of Reed Hall, the school's first building attributable to a single donor. He was buried in a private burial ground on Harris Street in Marblehead.

U.S. House of Representatives
Preceded by Benjamin Pickman, Jr.	Member of the U.S. House of Representatives from Massachusetts's 2nd congressional district March 4, 1811 – March 3, 1815	Succeeded by Timothy Pickering
