= United States Customshouse (Barnstable, Massachusetts) =

- U.S. Customshouse
- U.S. National Register of Historic Places
- U.S. Historic district – Contributing property
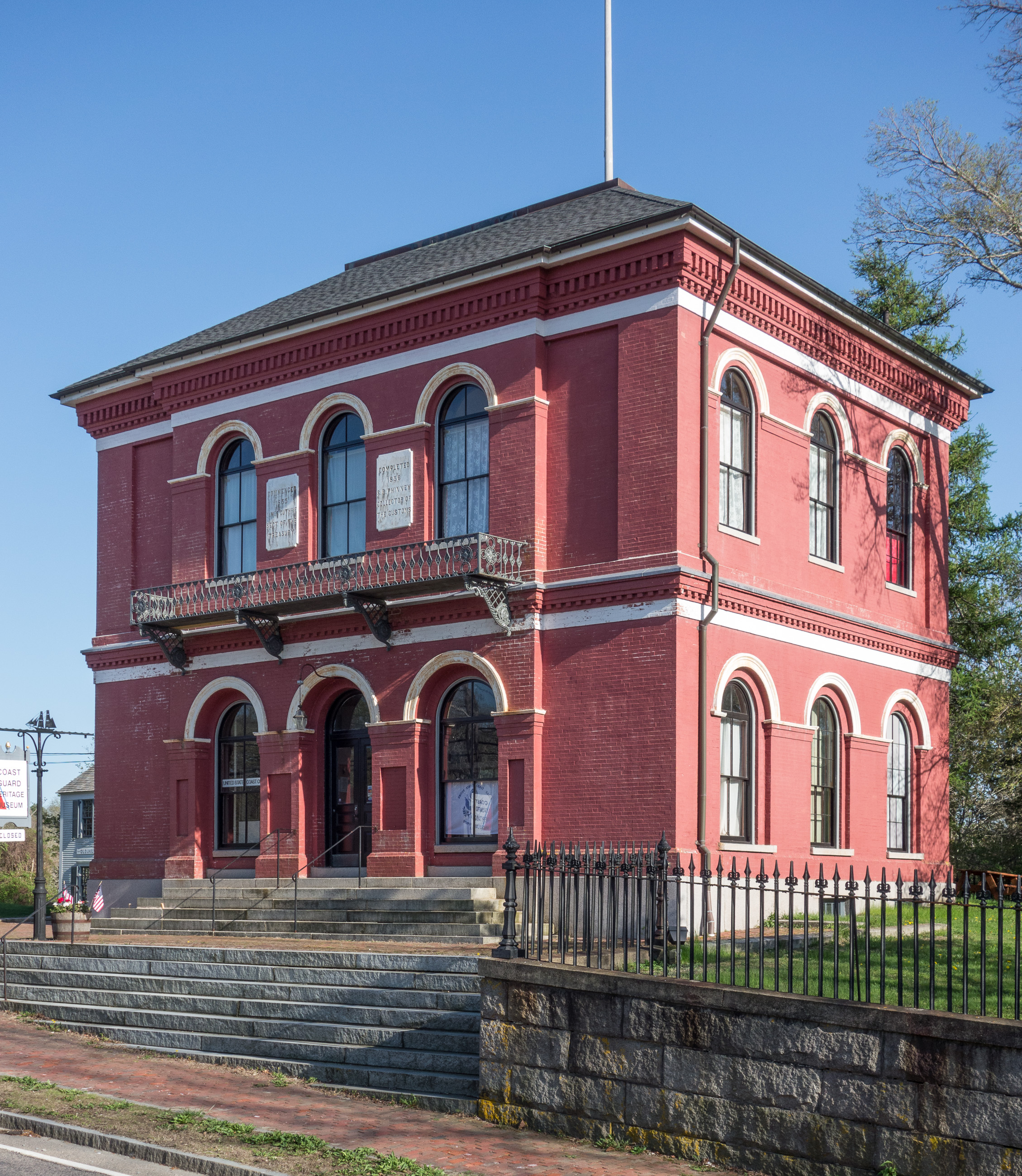
- US Customshouse in 2014

- Location within Cape Cod Location within Massachusetts Location within the United States
- Location: 3353 Main Street, Barnstable, Massachusetts
- Coordinates: 41°42′1″N 70°17′57″W
- Built: 1855
- Architect: Ammi B. Young
- Architectural style: Italianate
- Part of: Old King's Highway Historic District (ID87000314)
- NRHP reference No.: 75000239

Significant dates
- Added to NRHP: November 12, 1975
- Designated CP: March 12, 1987

The U.S. Customshouse (now known as the Coast Guard Heritage Museum and the Donald G. Trayser Memorial Museum) is a historic customs house and United States Coast Guard museum on Cobbs Hill in Barnstable, Massachusetts. Built in 1855 to a design by Ammi Young, it was used as a custom house and post office until 1913, continuing to house the post office and other offices until 1958. It was converted into a museum in 1960, and was listed on the National Register of Historic Places in 1975.

== Description and history ==
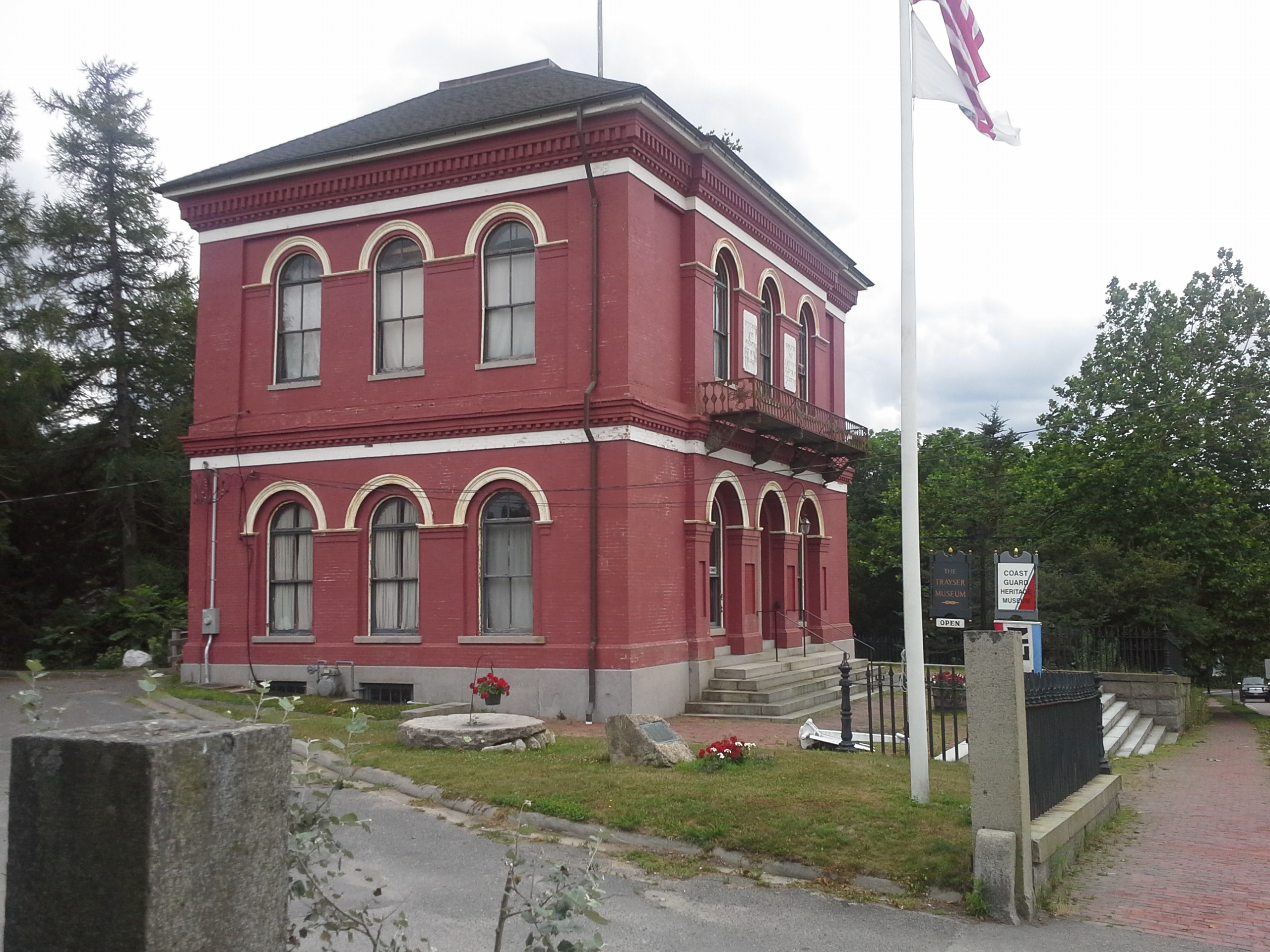

The former customshouse is set on the south side of Main Street just east of Barnstable's municipal complex. It is a two-story brick building with late Italianate styling, designed by Ammi Young and built in 1855. It has trim details of cast metal and a truncated hip roof. The building is nearly square, three bays on a side, with the front-facing bays projecting slightly. Its door and window openings have round-arch tops highlighted by light-colored trim. A line of corbeled brickwork separates the two floors, and there is more elaborate corbelling at the cornice. A carriage house with similar styling stands to the rear.

The port of Barnstable was one of the busiest in Massachusetts in the 19th century. Prior to the construction of this facility, the customs collector of the U.S. Customs District of Barnstable operated from his own home. This building at first house the post office on the ground floor and the offices of the customs collector on the second floor, serving both of these roles until 1913. The upstairs offices next housed offices of the Barnstable County Extension Service. The post office moved out in 1958, and the federal government turned the building over to the town in 1960. It has served as a museum property since, currently housing the Coast Guard Museum. The Old Jail (1690) is located on the museum grounds adjacent to the customshouse after being moved from another location nearby. There is also a working blacksmith shop with daily demonstrations on the museum grounds.

== See also ==
- List of maritime museums in the United States
- National Register of Historic Places listings in Barnstable County, Massachusetts
