= 1833 Massachusetts legislature =

American state legislature

54th Massachusetts General Court
←	53rd	55th	→

Overview
- Legislative body: General Court

Senate
- Members: 40
- President: Benjamin T. Pickman

House
- Members: 574
- Speaker: William B. Calhoun

Sessions
- 1st: January 2, 1833 – March 28, 1833

The 54th Massachusetts General Court, consisting of the Massachusetts Senate and the Massachusetts House of Representatives, met in 1833 during the governorship of Levi Lincoln Jr. Benjamin T. Pickman served as president of the Senate and William B. Calhoun served as speaker of the House.

== See also ==
- 22nd United States Congress
- List of Massachusetts General Courts
