= 1832 Massachusetts legislature =

American state legislature

53rd Massachusetts General Court
←	52nd	54th	→

Overview
- Legislative body: General Court

Senate
- Members: 40
- President: William Thorndike

House
- Members: 528
- Speaker: William B. Calhoun

Sessions
- 1st: January 4, 1832 – March 24, 1832

The 53rd Massachusetts General Court, consisting of the Massachusetts Senate and the Massachusetts House of Representatives, met in 1832 during the governorship of Levi Lincoln Jr. William Thorndike served as president of the Senate and William B. Calhoun served as speaker of the House.

== Senators ==
- Zack A. Williams
- Charles Wells

== Representatives ==
- Cyrus Alger
- Samuel Austin Jr.

== See also ==
- 22nd United States Congress
- List of Massachusetts General Courts
