= 1856 Massachusetts legislature =

American state legislature

77th Massachusetts General Court
←	76th	78th	→

Overview
- Legislative body: General Court

Senate
- Members: 40
- President: Elihu C. Baker

House
- Members: 329
- Speaker: Charles A. Phelps

Sessions
- 1st: January 1, 1856 – June 6, 1856

The 77th Massachusetts General Court, consisting of the Massachusetts Senate and the Massachusetts House of Representatives, met in 1856 during the governorship of Henry Gardner. Elihu C. Baker served as president of the Senate and Charles A. Phelps served as speaker of the House.

Topics discussed included banks, bridges, fisheries, hospitals, prisons, railroads, schools, and other matters.

== Senators ==
- Elihu C. Baker
- David H. Bartlett
- John Batchelder
- Amos Bates
- Sylvester Baxter
- Almon Brainard
- William S. Brakenridge
- Benjamin H. Brown
- Hiram C. Brown
- Ephraim W. Bull
- John A. Buttrick
- Augustus C. Carey
- James E. Carpenter
- Joseph E. Dawley
- Francis H. Dewey
- Jabez Fisher
- William Hall
- Alfred Kenrick
- Nathan King
- Benning Leavitt
- Artemas Lee
- Abiel S. Lewis
- Benjamin F. Mills
- Abel B. Munroe
- George Odiorne
- Ben Osgood
- Bradford K. Peirce
- Samuel S. Perkins
- Zabina L. Raymond
- John Rogers
- John H. Shaw
- William Sutton
- Velorous Taft
- William Taylor
- George M. Thacher
- Salem Towne
- Oliver Warner
- Daniel Warren
- George W. Warren
- Benjamin F. White

== Representatives ==
- Charles A. Phelps
- John A. Baxter
- Nathan Crocker
- Heman Smith
- Joshua C. Howes
- Erasmus Gould
- Elkanah Nickerson
- Josiah Freeman
- Joseph P. Johnson
- Charles H. Nye
- Samuel H. Smith Jr.
- John Y. Jacobs
- Samuel Thatcher Jr.
- Francis Armington
- Benjamin S. Earl
- Lawson Blood
- Job M. Godfrey
- Andrew Pollard
- Abiel Davis
- John Vinson
- Nathan Mayhew
- Elisha C. Hawkes
- Daniel Upton
- Russell C. Brown
- Thomas G. Carson
- Charles I. Taylor
- Charles S. Thatcher
- Horatio N. Sears
- Edwin Adams
- Lorenzo Webb
- Henry S. Briggs
- John C. West
- Lemuel K. Strickland
- Joseph Wilcox
- Thomas Wells
- Heman Ford
- Richard W. Swan
- Elkanah Briggs
- Enoch Boyce Jr.
- Nathaniel Potter Jr.
- George F. Gavitt
- William Barrows
- Daniel J. Lewis
- Job B. Ashley
- John S. Brayton
- Jonathan E. Morrill
- Brayton Slade
- Merchant White
- William Robinson
- Nathaniel Gilbert
- John Hicks
- Daniel Homer
- Edward Milliken
- Henry F. Thomas
- George B. Crane
- Nathan P. Towne
- Alpheus Pratt Jr.
- Nelson Goff
- Dudley Evans
- Moses Foster
- Gayton P. Osgood
- John I. Baker
- Richard P. Walters
- Israel W. Andrews
- Eben S. Poor
- Alonzo P. Philips
- Samuel Story
- George I. Tenney
- Jeremiah R. Cook
- Edward H. Pearce
- John Tenney
- Trueman M. Martyn
- William Taggart
- James Estes
- John Gale
- Benjamin Harding
- Thomas W. Floyd
- James S. Lewis
- Roland G. Usher
- William F. Johnson
- Jesse K. Snow
- David A. Titcomb
- Albert E. Low
- Franklin Knight
- Thomas W. Webber
- Joseph F. Ingalls
- Joseph Lunt
- Joshua D. Robinson
- Daniel M. Reed
- William H. Huse
- Samuel York
- Edward B. Arnold
- John Chamberlain
- Geo. H. Devereux
- Henry Luscomb, Jr.
- John W. Russell
- John W. Rhoades
- William H. Bagley
- William H. Newhall
- Joseph Z. Gordon
- Manley Guilford
- Adams Calhoun Deane
- Edwin Cooley
- Edward W. Stebbins
- Samuel O. Lamb
- Elijah Stratton
- Solomon A. Howe
- Hiram Smith
- Ralsa Tagart
- Alfred L. Converse
- Sylvester Allen
- Jonathan Jones
- John H. Smith
- Joshua Gray
- Stephen T. Colton
- Elisha T. Parsons
- William B. Converse
- Alonzo N. Dewey
- Horatio N. Case
- William Crossman
- Willis Phelps
- Henry Pomeroy
- Nathaniel Chapin
- Jonathan W. Freeland
- John Baldwin

== See also ==
- 34th United States Congress
- List of Massachusetts General Courts
