= 1834 Massachusetts legislature =

American state legislature

55th Massachusetts General Court
←	54th	56th	→

Overview
- Legislative body: General Court

Senate
- Members: 40
- President: Benjamin T. Pickman

House
- Members: 570
- Speaker: William B. Calhoun

Sessions
- 1st: January 1, 1834 – April 2, 1834

The 55th Massachusetts General Court, consisting of the Massachusetts Senate and the Massachusetts House of Representatives, met in 1834 during the governorship of John Davis. Benjamin T. Pickman served as president of the Senate and William B. Calhoun served as speaker of the House.

== Senators ==
- John R. Adan
- Nathaniel Austin
- John Bailey
- Gideon Barstow
- Ira Barton
- George Blake
- Patrick Boise
- Nathan C. Brownell
- James Byers
- John Cotton
- Elihu Cutler
- Alexander H. Everett
- William Foster
- Samuel French
- Artemas Hale
- Geo. Hawes
- Isaac L. Hedge
- Robert Hooper, Jr.
- Charles Hudson
- David Joy
- Jesse Kimball
- Samuel Lee
- John Leland
- Charles Marston
- Samuel Merrill
- Samuel Mixter
- Josiah Newhall
- Rejoice Newton
- William Nichols
- Benjamin T. Pickman
- Charles Russell
- Daniel Shattuck
- Edward Stevens
- Thomas B. Strong
- Christopher Webb
- Daniel Wells
- Seth Whitmarsh
- Sidney Willard
- Eliphalet Williams
- Nathaniel Wright

== Representatives ==
- Samuel Aspinwall

== See also ==
- 23rd United States Congress
- List of Massachusetts General Courts
