= New England Emigrant Aid Company =

American tansportation company

Trade sign used at the Boston headquarters of the New England Emigrant Aid Company

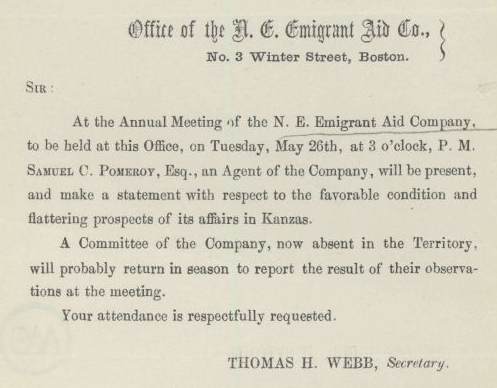
Document related to the N.E. Emigrant Aid Company, 1857

The New England Emigrant Aid Company (Note: Sometimes referred to as the New England Emigrant Aid Society, or abbreviated as the NEEAC.) (originally the Massachusetts Emigrant Aid Company) was a transportation company founded in Boston, Massachusetts by activist Eli Thayer in the wake of the Kansas–Nebraska Act, which allowed the population of Kansas Territory to choose whether slavery would be legal. The company's ultimate purpose was to transport anti-slavery immigrants into the Kansas Territory. The company believed that if enough anti-slavery immigrants settled en masse in the newly-opened territory, they would be able to shift the balance of political power in the territory, which in turn would lead to Kansas becoming a free state (rather than a slave state) when it eventually joined the United States.

The company is noted less for its direct impact than for the psychological impact it had on proslavery and abolitionist groups. Thayer's prediction that the company would eventually be able to send 20,000 immigrants a year never came to fruition, but it spurred border ruffians from nearby Missouri, where slavery was legal, to move to Kansas to ensure its admission to the Union as a slave state. That, in turn, further galvanized Free-Staters and other enemies of the Slave Power.

Thayer's intention was to capitalize on anti-slavery sentiment in the Northern United States and to send settlers to Kansas to purchase land and build houses, shops, and mills. They could then sell the land at a significant profit and send the proceeds back to Thayer and his investors. At the behest of several investors, who found the notion of profiting from the anti-slavery cause distasteful, the company's model was shifted to that of a benevolent society, and it was renamed the New England Emigrant Aid Company in 1855.

== Creation ==
The company was formed in the midst of the sectional crisis that preceded the American Civil War. To the Northern United States, the concept of popular sovereignty, which stated that the population of each new US state should be allowed to decide if it allowed slavery, was an attempt by Southerners to gain power. When the Kansas–Nebraska Act threatened to extend popular sovereignty into the new Kansas Territory, Eli Thayer, a second-term Congressman from Massachusetts, hatched the idea of an Emigrant Aid Company in the winter of 1853–1854. His primary partners in the venture were Alexander H. Bullock and Edward Everett Hale, and together, they set Thayer's plans in motion on March 5, 1854. Thayer announced the company at a rally against the impending passage of the Kansas–Nebraska Act in Worcester on March 11. Shortly thereafter, the company's charter was approved by the Massachusetts Legislature for up to $5,000,000 in capital.

Officially, the company was a profit-making venture, and how the settlers voted was of no consequence to the company. For example, the company secretary, Thomas Webb released a pamphlet in 1855 stating that although the settlers sent to the territories would not be required to vote for one side or the other, they were expected to support the free-state movement. A number of abolitionists questioned the profit motive behind the company, and even many of Thayer's potential investors balked at the notion "that people might say we were influenced by pecuniary considerations in our patriotic work." Although Thayer personally disagreed with such hesitations, in 1855 the company reorganized as a benevolent society and changed its name to the New England Emigrant Aid Company.

== Reaction ==
The success of the endeavor prompted other aid assistance companies to form back East, in New York and Ohio, with new companies such as the Worcester County Emigrant Aid Society.

== Impact ==
The company was directly responsible for creating the Kansas towns of Lawrence and Manhattan, and it played a key role in founding Topeka and Osawatomie. Lawrence was named after the company secretary, Amos Adams Lawrence. Multiple politicians were found in the emigrants who left for Kansas, such as Daniel Read Anthony, Charles L. Robinson, Samuel C. Pomeroy, and Martin F. Conway, who would later be Kansas's first US Representative.

The exact number of people who left for Kansas is unknown. James Rawley puts the numbers somewhere around 2000, about a third of whom returned home, but the Kansas Historical Society puts the number at around 900 for those who left for Kansas in 1855 alone.

== See also ==
- Bleeding Kansas

== Sources ==
- Corder, Eric (1970). Prelude to Civil War; Kansas-Missouri, 1854-61. New York City, NY: Crowell-Collier Press.
- Davis, Kenneth Sydney (1984). Kansas: A History. States and the nation. New York, New York: W. W. Norton & Company. ISBN 0-393-30179-6.
- Etcheson, Nicole (2004). Bleeding Kansas: Contested Liberty in the Civil War Era. Lawrence, Kansas: University Press of Kansas. ISBN 0-7006-1287-4.
- Freehling, William W. (1990). The Road to Disunion. Oxford, UK: Oxford University Press. ISBN 0-19-505814-3.
- Goodrich, T.H. (1998). War to the Knife: Bleeding Kansas, 1854-1861. Mechanicsburg, Pennsylvania: Stackpole Books. ISBN 0-8117-1921-9.
- Olson, Kevin G. W. (2012). Frontier Manhattan: Yankee Settlement to Kansas Town, 1854-1894. Lawrence, KS: University Press of Kansas. ISBN 978-0-7006-1832-3.
- Rawley, James A. (1979). Race & Politics: "Bleeding Kansas" and the Coming of the Civil War. Lincoln, Nebraska: University of Nebraska Press. ISBN 0-8032-3854-1.
- Thayer, Eli (1889). History of the Kansas Crusade: Its Friends and its Foes.
