= William Thorndike =

American politician

19th President of the Massachusetts Senate
- In office 1832–1832
- Preceded by: Leverett Saltonstall
- Succeeded by: Benjamin T. Pickman

Member of the Massachusetts Senate
- In office 1828–1832

Member of the Massachusetts House of Representatives
- In office 1826–1827

Personal details
- Born: January 22, 1795 Beverly, Massachusetts
- Died: July 12, 1835 (aged 40) Beverly, Massachusetts
- Spouse(s): Anna (Nancy) Stephens, m. November 8, 1821 Beverly, Massachusetts
- Education: Harvard College

William Thorndike (January 22, 1795 – July 12, 1835) was a Massachusetts lawyer and politician who served in the Massachusetts House of Representatives, and as a member and President of the Massachusetts Senate.

== See also ==
- 53rd Massachusetts General Court (1832)

Political offices
Preceded by Leverett Saltonstall	19th President of the Massachusetts Senate; 1832	Succeeded by Benjamin T. Pickman
