= Julius Rockwell =

American politician

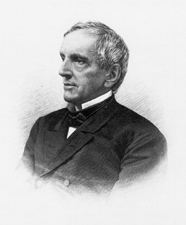

United States Senator from Massachusetts
- In office June 3, 1854 – January 31, 1855
- Appointed by: Emory Washburn
- Preceded by: Edward Everett
- Succeeded by: Henry Wilson

Member of the U.S. House of Representatives from Massachusetts's 7th district
- In office March 4, 1843 – March 3, 1851
- Preceded by: George N. Briggs
- Succeeded by: John Z. Goodrich

Speaker of the Massachusetts House of Representatives
- In office 1835–1837
- Preceded by: William B. Calhoun
- Succeeded by: Robert Charles Winthrop
- In office 1858–1858
- Preceded by: Charles A. Phelps
- Succeeded by: Charles Hale

Member of the Massachusetts House of Representatives
- In office 1834–1837
- In office 1858–1858

Personal details
- Born: April 26, 1805 Colebrook, Connecticut, US
- Died: May 19, 1888 (aged 83) Lenox, Massachusetts, US
- Party: Whig
- Other political affiliations: Republican Party
- Education: Yale University
- Profession: Law

Julius Rockwell (April 26, 1805 – May 19, 1888) was a United States politician from Massachusetts, and the father of Francis Williams Rockwell.

Rockwell was born in Colebrook, Connecticut, and educated at private schools and then Yale, where he studied law, graduating in 1826. He was admitted to the bar and in 1830 commenced practice in Pittsfield, Massachusetts. He was elected a member of the Massachusetts House of Representatives in 1834 and served four years, three of them as Speaker. Rockwell was appointed commissioner of the Bank of Massachusetts from 1838 to 1840.

In 1842 he successfully ran as a Whig candidate for the House of Representatives and was re-elected three times, serving from 1843 to 1851. He did not seek renomination in 1850. He was a delegate to the state constitutional convention in 1853, and was appointed to the Senate in 1854 to fill the vacancy caused by the resignation of Edward Everett, serving from June 3, 1854, to January 31, 1855, when his successor Henry Wilson was elected. Rockwell voted in the electoral college for the Republican candidate John C. Frémont in the presidential election of 1856.

Rockwell returned to his old post of Speaker of the Massachusetts House of Representatives in 1858, until his appointment to the Massachusetts Superior Court in 1859. He retired as a judge in 1886 and died May 19, 1888, in Lenox, Massachusetts, where he is buried.

== See also ==
- 56th Massachusetts General Court (1835)
- 79th Massachusetts General Court (1858)

Party political offices
| First | Republican nominee for Governor of Massachusetts; 1855 | Succeeded by Henry Gardner |
Massachusetts House of Representatives
| Preceded by William B. Calhoun | Speaker of the Massachusetts House of Representatives; 1835 — 1837 | Succeeded by Robert Charles Winthrop |
U.S. House of Representatives
| Preceded by George N. Briggs | Member of the U.S. House of Representatives for Massachusetts's 7th district March 4, 1843 – March 3, 1851 | Succeeded by John Z. Goodrich |
U.S. Senate
| Preceded by Edward Everett | U.S. senator (Class 2) from Massachusetts; June 3, 1854 (appointed) – January 31, 1855 (successor elected); Served alongside: Charles Sumner | Succeeded by Henry Wilson |
Massachusetts House of Representatives
| Preceded by Charles A. Phelps | Speaker of the Massachusetts House of Representatives; 1858 | Succeeded by Charles Hale |
Legal offices
| Preceded by | Justice of the Massachusetts Superior Court; 1859— | Succeeded by |
