= William B. Calhoun =

American politician (1796–1865)

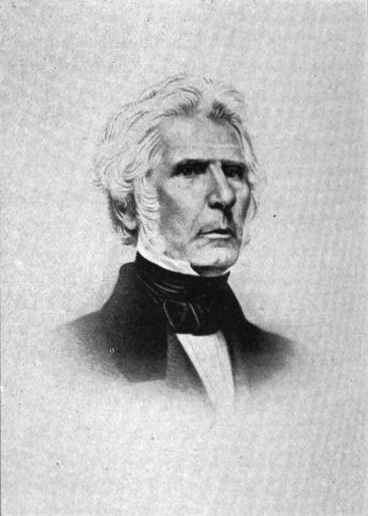

Member of the U.S. House of Representatives from Massachusetts's 8th district
- In office March 4, 1835 – March 3, 1843
- Preceded by: Isaac C. Bates
- Succeeded by: John Quincy Adams

5th Mayor of Springfield, Massachusetts
- In office 1859–1859
- Preceded by: Ansel Phelps, Jr.
- Succeeded by: Daniel L Harris

28th President of the Massachusetts Senate
- In office 1846–1847
- Preceded by: Levi Lincoln Jr.
- Succeeded by: Zeno Scudder

10th Massachusetts Secretary of the Commonwealth
- In office January 1848 – 1851
- Governor: George N. Briggs
- Preceded by: John G. Palfrey
- Succeeded by: Amasa Walker

Speaker of the Massachusetts House of Representatives
- In office 1828–1834
- Preceded by: William C. Jarvis
- Succeeded by: Julius Rockwell

Member of the Massachusetts House of Representatives
- In office 1825–1834
- In office 1861–1861

Personal details
- Born: William Barron Calhoun; December 29, 1796
- Died: November 8, 1865 (aged 68) Springfield, Massachusetts
- Party: Anti-Jacksonian, Whig
- Spouse: Margaret Howard

William Barron Calhoun (December 29, 1796 – November 8, 1865) was a U.S. representative from Massachusetts.

== Early life ==
Calhoun, the eldest child of Andrew Calhoun and Martha (Chamberlain) Calhoun, was born on December 29, 1796, in Boston, Massachusetts. Calhoun graduated from Yale College in 1814.

After his graduation from Yale, Calhoun studied law, first in Concord, New Hampshire, and later in Springfield, Massachusetts. Calhoun was admitted to the bar and commenced practice in Springfield.

Calhoun served as member of the Massachusetts House of Representatives 1825-1834, serving as speaker 1828-1834.

== Election to Congress ==
Calhoun was elected as an Anti-Jacksonian to the Twenty-fourth Congress and as a Whig to the three succeeding Congresses (March 4, 1835 – March 3, 1843). Calhoun served as chairman of the Committee on Private Land Claims (Twenty-sixth Congress). Calhoun was not a candidate for renomination in 1842.

== Post Congressional career ==
In 1844 Calhoun was a Presidential Elector for Henry Clay.

Calhoun served as member of the Massachusetts Senate in 1846 and 1847, serving as its president. He served as Secretary of the Commonwealth of Massachusetts 1848-1851 and State bank commissioner from 1853 to 1855. He served as mayor of Springfield, Massachusetts in 1859. He was again a member of the Massachusetts House of Representatives in 1861.

== Death and interment ==
Calhoun died in Springfield, Massachusetts, November 8, 1865, he was interred in Springfield Cemetery.

== See also ==
- 53rd Massachusetts General Court (1832)
- 54th Massachusetts General Court (1833)
- 55th Massachusetts General Court (1834)
- 68th Massachusetts General Court (1847)

Massachusetts House of Representatives
Preceded by William C. Jarvis	Speaker of the Massachusetts House of Representatives; 1828 — 1834	Succeeded by Julius Rockwell
U.S. House of Representatives
Preceded by Isaac C. Bates	Member of the U.S. House of Representatives from Massachusetts's 8th congressional district March 4, 1835 – March 3, 1843	Succeeded by John Quincy Adams
Massachusetts Senate
Preceded by Levi Lincoln Jr.	29th President of the Massachusetts Senate; 1846-1847	Succeeded by Zeno Scudder
Political offices
Preceded by John G. Palfrey	10th Massachusetts Secretary of the Commonwealth; January 1848 – 1851	Succeeded by Amasa Walker
Preceded by Ansel Phelps, Jr.	5th Mayor of Springfield, Massachusetts; 1859	Succeeded by Daniel L Harris
