= Charles A. Phelps =

American politician (1820–1902)

40th President of the Massachusetts Senate
- In office 1858–1858
- Preceded by: Charles W. Upham
- Succeeded by: William Claflin

Member of the Massachusetts Senate Fourth Suffolk Senate District
- In office 1857–1858
- Preceded by: Daniel Warren
- Succeeded by: George A. Shaw

Speaker of the Massachusetts House of Representatives
- In office 1856–1856
- Preceded by: Daniel C. Eddy
- Succeeded by: Julius Rockwell

Member of the Massachusetts House of Representatives
- In office 1855–1856

Personal details
- Born: October 19, 1820 Boston, Massachusetts
- Died: April 27, 1902 (aged 81) Boston, Massachusetts
- Party: Know Nothing, Republican
- Spouse: Phoebe Harris
- Children: Charles Harris Phelps
- Education: Union College, 1841; Harvard Medical School, 1844
- Profession: Physician

Charles Abner Phelps (October 19, 1820 – April 27, 1902) was an American medical doctor, diplomat, and politician, who served as a member, and the Speaker, of the Massachusetts House of Representatives, and as a member and the President of the Massachusetts Senate.

== Early life and education ==
Phelps was born October 19, 1820, in Boston, to Abner Phelps and Delia Hubbell (née Clark) Phelps. He attended the Mount Pleasant Classical School in Amherst, Massachusetts, where one of his classmates was Henry Ward Beecher Phelps then went on to study at the Boston Latin School and then Phillips Academy in Andover, Massachusetts, he then studied with a private tutor in Cambridge, Massachusetts to prepare himself for Yale College. Phelps attended Yale for a year then he transferred to Union College where he graduated in 1841. Phelps then attended Harvard Medical School graduating in 1844, he did his post graduate work at the Jefferson Medical College in Philadelphia, Pennsylvania.

== Family life ==
Phelps married Phoebe Harris of Albany, New York, she was the sister of U.S. Senator Ira Harris. On September 14, 1845, their son Charles Harris Phelps was born. Charles physically abused his wife and had her committed to an insane asylum following a confrontation about his extramarital affairs. Charles also attempted to deprive his wife of access to their children. Phoebe took her daughter and fled to a Quaker family but Charles tracked them down and brought them back, so Phoebe sought help from Susan B. Anthony. Anthony spirited the mother and daughter out of town, working to find a safe and confidential place for them. Anthony faced backlash from prominent reformers including Wendell Phillips and William Lloyd Garrison. Massachusetts law gave entire guardianship over children to fathers, and Phillips and Garrison argued that Anthony should obey the law and stay out of the domestic dispute. Anthony refused to reveal Phoebe and her daughter's location. However, Charles was relentless and his agents eventually recaptured the daughter. Phoebe never saw her daughter again.

== See also ==
- 77th Massachusetts General Court (1856)
- 78th Massachusetts General Court (1857)
- 80th Massachusetts General Court (1859)

Massachusetts House of Representatives
| Preceded by Daniel C. Eddy | Speaker of the Massachusetts House of Representatives; 1856 – 1857 | Succeeded by Julius Rockwell |
Massachusetts Senate
| Preceded by Daniel Warren | Member of the Massachusetts Senate; 4th Suffolk Senate District; 1858 – 1860 | Succeeded by George A. Shaw |
| Preceded by Charles W. Upham | 40th President of the Massachusetts Senate; 1859 – 1860 | Succeeded by William Claflin |
Diplomatic posts
| Preceded by David McMurtie Gregg | United States Consul at Prague; 1877 – 1885 | Succeeded by Charles Jonas |
