= Joseph Hiss =

American politician (1826–1878)

Member of the Massachusetts House of Representatives for Suffolk County
- In office 1855–1855

Personal details
- Born: April 3, 1826 Baltimore
- Died: October 2, 1878 (aged 52) Baltimore
- Party: Know Nothing
- Spouse: Caroline Matilda Mason
- Occupation: Clothier

Joseph Hiss (April 3, 1826 – October 2, 1878) was an American politician who was expelled from the Massachusetts House of Representatives in 1855. He was the first member of the House to ever be expelled.

== Early life ==
Hiss was born in Baltimore on April 3, 1826. On September 28, 1845 he married Caroline Matilda Mason. The couple had one child together. The Hisses eventually moved to Boston, where Joseph worked as a clothier and became involved with the Know Nothings.

== House of Representatives ==
In 1854, the Know Nothings won every seat in the Massachusetts Senate and all but 4 in the House. Hiss was elected to represent Suffolk County in the House of Representatives.

On January 22, 1855, the House approved a petition from the citizens of Foxborough, Massachusetts that would allow for government inspection of "convents, nunneries, or by whatever name they may be designated". A joint special Nunnery Committee was created and Hiss was appointed to serve on it. On February 15, 1855, the House voted to allow the committee to inspect Catholic "Theological Seminaries, Boarding Schools, Academies, Nunneries, Convents and other institutions of a like character, as they may deem necessary, to enable them to make a final report on the subject committed to their consideration". The committee later voted to allow guests to join them during their investigative trips. The committee and their guests visited the College of the Holy Cross and the Notre Dame Academy in Roxbury on March 26 and a Catholic School in Lowell on March 29.

While in Lowell, Hiss requested a room at his hotel for a "Mrs. Patterson" and requested that dinner be brought to her room. A chambermaid later testified that it appeared two people had slept in Mrs. Patterson’s bed while Hiss’ bed appeared to have not been used that night. As a guest of the committee, Mrs. Patterson’s bill was covered by the Commonwealth of Massachusetts. The Boston Daily Advertiser, published by Nathan and Charles Hale came out against the committee. The Hales objected to the committee’s warrant-less searches that were conducted with "no sufficient particular reason" as well as the food, alcohol, travel, and lodging expenses racked up by the committee. The Advertiser was joined by ten of the city’s eleven other newspapers in calling for an investigation into the committee. A committee was formed to investigate the activities of the committee at the school in Roxbury and a separate committee was formed to investigate Hiss’ activities in Lowell. On May 9, 1855, the committee investigating Hiss recommended his expulsion from the Massachusetts House of Representatives. The House then voted 230 to 30 to remove him. On May 14, Hiss twice returned to the House Chamber and was removed by the sergeant-at-arms both times. It was believed that Hiss did this on the advice of his legal counsel. On May 16 he was arrested at the insistence of Bemis & Boise, one of Hiss’ creditors, on a Mesne process. Hiss petitioned for a writ of Habeas corpus, on the grounds that he was a member of the House of Representatives and immune from arrest. Hiss, represented by Benjamin Butler and Benjamin Dean, had his case heard by the Massachusetts Supreme Judicial Court. Butler argued that because the House was not granted the power to expel members in the Constitution of Massachusetts and not included in the rules and orders of the House, Hiss’ expulsion was illegal. In an opinion written by Chief Justice Lemuel Shaw, the Court found that although the Constitution did not authorize expulsion, there was no indication that the framers intended to withhold this power and the "power of expulsion is a necessary and incidental power, to enable the house to perform its high functions, and necessary to the safety of the state".

== Later life ==
Following the scandal, Hiss returned to Baltimore, where he died on October 2, 1878.
