= Henry Austin Scudder =

American politician and judge (1819–1892)

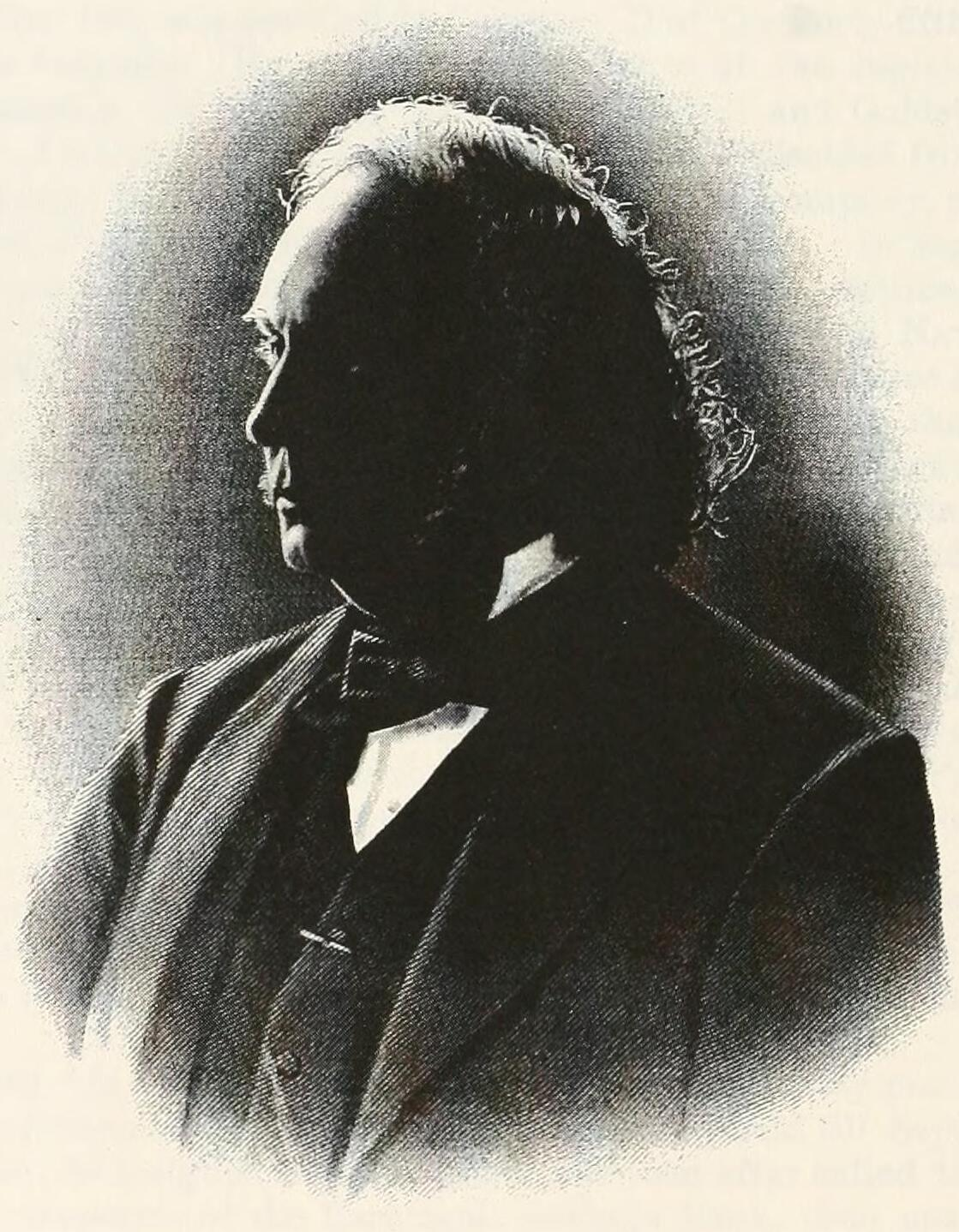
- Portrait of Scudder in an 1890 publication

Member of the Massachusetts House of Representatives from the Dorchester district
- In office 1861–1865

Personal details
- Born: November 25, 1819 Osterville, Barnstable, Massachusetts, U.S.
- Died: January 26, 1892 (aged 72) Washington, D.C., U.S.
- Party: Republican
- Spouse: Nannie B. Tobey Jackson (m. 1857)
- Relatives: Zeno Scudder (brother); Horace Scudder (cousin)
- Education: Yale College; Harvard Law School
- Occupation: Politician; lawyer; judge; educator
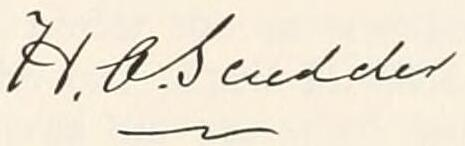
- Signature

Henry Austin Scudder (November 25, 1819 – January 26, 1892), was a Massachusetts state legislator and judge.

== Early life ==
Henry Austin Scudder was born on November 25, 1819, in Osterville, Barnstable, Massachusetts, as the youngest son of Hannah (née Lovell) and Josiah Scudder. His cousin was Horace Scudder.

Scudder attended common schools in Barnstable. He attended the Hyannis Academy and became a teacher. He entered Yale College with the class of 1841, but left school after a single term. He then edited The Barnstable Patriot for a year before graduating from Yale in 1842 with a Bachelor of Arts. He was a founder of Scroll and Key in 1842. He then studied law in the Barnstable office of his brother Zeno Scudder until the spring of 1844. He then studied an additional six months with George Tyler Bigelow of Boston. He also studied at Harvard Law School. He was admitted to the bar in Suffolk County in 1844.

== Career ==
Scudder began practicing law in Boston. He practiced law with Philip Howes Sears in Boston from October or November of 1851 to November 1853.

Scudder was a Republican. From 1861 to 1865, he served as a member of the Massachusetts State Legislature, representing Dorchester. He was a member of the 1864 National Union National Convention that nominated Abraham Lincoln. In February 1869, he was appointed as an associate judge of the Superior Court of Massachusetts by Governor William Claflin. He resigned from the role in 1872 due to poor health. He then spent time in Europe and returned in 1874. In 1882, he was offered the office of Judge of Probate and Insolvency by Governor John Davis Long, but he declined due to his health.

Scudder was a member of the New England Genealogical Society from 1857 to 1862.

== Personal life ==
Scudder married Nannie B. (née Tobey) Jackson, daughter of Charles B. Tobey, of Boston on June 30, 1857. Following his marriage, he lived in Dorchester. He spent the end of his life spending winters in Washington, D.C., and summers at his Willow Dell home in Marstons Mills of Barnstable. He had facial neuralgia.

Scudder had lived in the Hamilton House in Washington, D.C., for about 10 years. He died on January 26, 1892, at the Hamilton House.
