= Zeno Scudder =

American politician

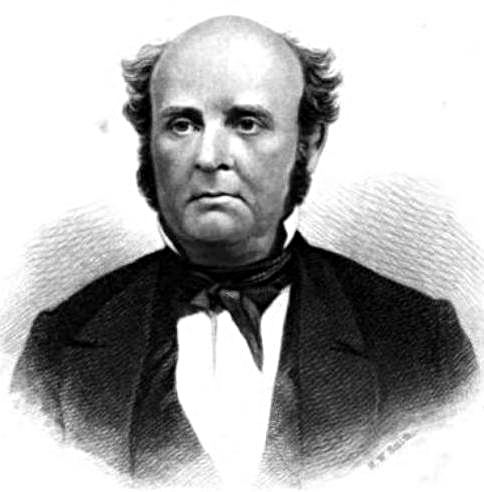

Member of the U.S. House of Representatives from Massachusetts
- In office March 4, 1851 – March 4, 1854
- Preceded by: Joseph Grinnell
- Succeeded by: Thomas D. Eliot
- Constituency: 10th district (1851–53); 1st district (1853–54)

President of the Massachusetts State Senate
- In office 1848–1848
- Preceded by: William B. Calhoun
- Succeeded by: Joseph Bell

Member of the Massachusetts State Senate
- In office 1846–1848

Personal details
- Born: August 18, 1807 Barnstable, Massachusetts
- Died: June 26, 1857 (aged 49) Osterville section of Barnstable, Massachusetts
- Party: Whig
- Relatives: Henry Austin Scudder (brother)

Zeno Scudder (August 18, 1807 – June 26, 1857) was an American politician and attorney who was the president of the Massachusetts Senate in 1848 and a member of the United States House of Representatives from Massachusetts from 1851 until 1854.

== Biography ==
Scudder was born in Osterville, Massachusetts, on August 18, 1807, as the son of Hannah (née Lovell) and Josiah Scudder. His brother was Henry Austin Scudder. He had a paralysis in his right leg that made a naval career impossible. He studied medicine at Bowdoin College and then law at the Cambridge Law School. He was admitted to the bar in 1856 and conducted practice in Barnstable, Massachusetts.

Scudder was a member of the Massachusetts Senate from 1846 until 1848 and served as Senate President. He was a member of the United States House of Representatives from Massachusetts from 1851 until 1854.

Scudder was elected as a Whig to the Thirty-second and Thirty-third Congresses. His special interest while in Congress was American Fisheries. He served from March 4, 1851, until his resignation on March 4, 1854.

Scudder died in Barnstable, Massachusetts, on June 26, 1857, and was interred in Hillside Cemetery, Osterville.

== See also ==
- 69th Massachusetts General Court (1848)

Political offices
Preceded by William B. Calhoun	President of the Massachusetts Senate; 1848 — 1848	Succeeded by Joseph Bell
U.S. House of Representatives
Preceded by Joseph Grinnell	Member of the U.S. House of Representatives from Massachusetts's 10th congressional district March 4, 1851 – March 3, 1853	Succeeded by Edward Dickinson
Preceded by William Appleton	Member of the U.S. House of Representatives from Massachusetts's 1st congressional district March 4, 1853 – March 4, 1854	Succeeded by Thomas D. Eliot
