= Isaac C. Bates =

American politician (1779–1845)

Isaac Chapman Bates
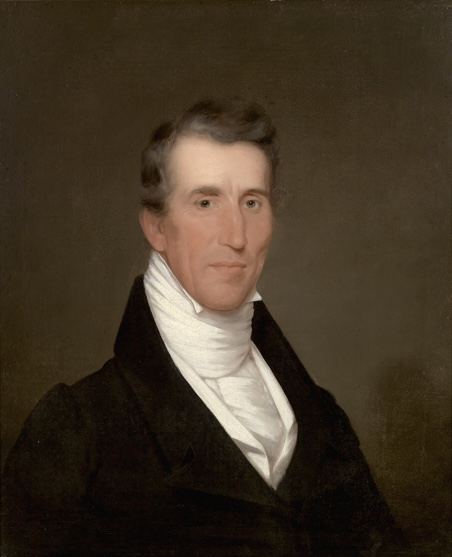
- Portrait by Chester Harding

United States Senator from Massachusetts
- In office January 13, 1841 – March 16, 1845
- Preceded by: John Davis
- Succeeded by: John Davis

Member of the U.S. House of Representatives from Massachusetts's 8th district
- In office March 4, 1827 – March 3, 1835
- Preceded by: Samuel Lathrop
- Succeeded by: William B. Calhoun

Member of the Massachusetts House of Representatives
- In office 1808–1809

Personal details
- Born: January 23, 1779 Granville, Massachusetts, U.S.
- Died: March 16, 1845 (aged 66) Washington, D.C., U.S.
- Party: Federalist; Whig
- Education: Yale College
- Profession: Law

Isaac Chapman Bates (January 23, 1779 – March 16, 1845) was an American politician from Massachusetts.

He was born in Granville, Massachusetts, and graduated from Yale College in 1802. He practiced law in Northampton, Massachusetts, in 1808.

== Political career ==
=== Massachusetts House of Representatives ===
He was a member of the Massachusetts House of Representatives (1808–1809).

=== United States House of Representatives ===
Bates was elected to the United States House of Representatives (March 4, 1827 – March 3, 1835), where he was an Anti-Jacksonian. He was chairman of the U.S. House Committee on Military Pensions in the Twenty-first Congress. He declined to be a candidate for renomination in 1834.

=== United States Senate ===
He was elected as a Whig to the United States Senate to fill the vacancy in the term ending March 3, 1841, caused by the resignation of John Davis and on the same day elected for the term commencing March 4, 1841, and served from January 13, 1841, until his death. He was chairman of the U.S. Senate Committee on Pensions (Twenty-seventh and Twenty-eighth Congresses); interment in Bridge Street Cemetery, Northampton, Massachusetts.

== See also ==
- List of members of the United States Congress who died in office (1790–1899)

== Sources and external links ==
- United States Congress. "Isaac C. Bates (id: B000233)". Biographical Directory of the United States Congress.
- "Memoir of Hon. I.C. Bates, Late United States Senator from Massachusetts." American Whig Review 3 (February 1846): 186–192.

U.S. House of Representatives
Preceded by Samuel Lathrop	Member of the U.S. House of Representatives from Massachusetts's 8th congressional district March 4, 1827-March 3, 1835	Succeeded by William B. Calhoun
U.S. Senate
Preceded by John Davis	U.S. senator (Class 2) from Massachusetts; January 13, 1841 - March 16, 1845; Served alongside: Daniel Webster, Rufus Choate	Succeeded by John Davis
