= Otis Lord =

American judge (1812–1884)

Otis Phillips Lord (July 11, 1812 – March 13, 1884) was an American lawyer and politician who served as a justice of the Massachusetts Supreme Judicial Court from 1875 to 1882 and as the speaker of the Massachusetts House of Representatives in 1854. In addition to his public roles, he is suspected of having been a lover of Emily Dickinson in her later life.

== Education ==
Born in Ipswich, Massachusetts, he attended Dummer Academy and graduated from Amherst College in 1832, and from Harvard Law School in 1836.

== Political and judicial service ==
Lord was a member of the Massachusetts House of Representatives for several stretches in the 1840s and 1850s. He served in the Massachusetts Senate in 1849, and was member of the constitutional convention in 1853. He was speaker of the Massachusetts House in 1854. In 1859 be was appointed by Governor Nathaniel P. Banks justice of the Superior court. An anecdote arising from his time there was published in newspapers around the country:

The late Judge Otis Phillips Lord, of Massachusetts, is said to have made but one direct mistake on a question of law while on the bench, and that was of a statute which had just been amended. On discovering his mistake, and that it was due to the action just taken by the Legislature, he said: "Well, the good Lord only knows what the Massachusetts Legislature hasn't done in the last six months."

In 1868, Lord was the Democratic candidate for the U.S. House of Representatives from Essex County, Massachusetts. He "did not make a single speech and withdrew from the campaign a week before the election." He lost to incumbent Republican Benjamin Butler, but he received more votes than independent candidate Richard Henry Dana Jr.

In 1875 Governor William A. Gaston appointed Lord to the Supreme bench. Lord resigned in 1882 due to poor health, and was succeeded on the court by Oliver Wendell Holmes Jr.

== Personal life ==
Lord married Elizabeth W. Farley on October 9, 1843. The couple had no children. Lord was friends with Edward Dickinson through their mutual association with Amherst College, and was a frequent houseguest at the Dickinson residence. Following Edward's death in 1874, Lord continued to visit Emily Dickinson, then in her 40s, to offer support.

Elizabeth died in 1877. Lord's friendship with Dickinson probably thereafter became a late-life romance, though as their letters were destroyed, this is surmised. Dickinson found a kindred soul in Lord, especially in terms of shared literary interests; the few letters which survived contain multiple quotations of Shakespeare's work, including the plays Othello, Antony and Cleopatra, Hamlet and King Lear. In 1880 he gave her Cowden Clarke's Complete Concordance to Shakespeare (1877). Dickinson wrote that "While others go to Church, I go to mine, for are you not my Church, and have we not a Hymn that no one knows but us?" She referred to him as "My lovely Salem" and they wrote to each other religiously every Sunday. Dickinson looked forward to this day greatly; a surviving fragment of a letter written by her states that "Tuesday is a deeply depressed Day". In 1882, following the death of Dickinson's mother, Lord suggested that they marry, but she declined, apparently so as not to burden him with the possibility of her repeating an epileptic seizure.

After being critically ill for several years, Lord died at his residence in Salem, Massachusetts. Dickinson referred to him as "our latest Lost".

== See also ==
- 75th Massachusetts General Court (1854)

Political offices
Preceded by John Wells	Justice of the Massachusetts Supreme Judicial Court; 1875–1882	Succeeded by Oliver Wendell Holmes Jr.
