= Albert H. Nelson =

American jurist and politician (1812–1858)

District Attorney for the Northern District of Massachusetts
- In office 1845–1848
- Preceded by: Asahel Huntington
- Succeeded by: Charles R. Train (as Middlesex County district attorney); Asahel Huntington (as Essex County district attorney)

Personal details
- Born: March 12, 1812 Milford, Massachusetts, U.S or Carlisle, Massachusetts, U.S.
- Died: June 27, 1858 (aged 46) Somerville, Massachusetts, U.S.
- Party: Whig; Know Nothing
- Spouse: Elizabeth Phinney (1840–1858; his death)
- Education: Harvard College; Harvard Law School
- Occupation: Lawyer

Albert Hobart Nelson (March 12, 1812 – June 27, 1858) was an American jurist and politician who served as chief justice of the Suffolk County Superior Court from 1855 to 1858.

== Early life ==
Nelson was born on March 12, 1812, in Milford or Carlisle, Massachusetts. His parents were Dr. John Nelson, a physician, and Lucinda (Parkhurst) Nelson. He attended the Concord Academy and graduated from Harvard College in 1832. After a year of teaching in Maryland, Nelson returned to Cambridge, Massachusetts to attended Harvard Law School. After graduating, he studied in the office of John Keyes in Concord, Massachusetts. After he passed the bar in 1836, Nelson joined Keyes as a partner. After a year, Keyes dissolved the firm and Nelson began a solo practice.

== Politics ==
Nelson first became involved in politics in Concord, which was home to a number of Whig politicians, including Samuel and Ebenezer R. Hoar. Nelson wrote and delivered speeches for William Henry Harrison during the 1840 United States presidential election and served on Concord's school committee. In September 1840 he married Elizabeth Phinney, sister of Mary Phinney von Olnhausen. In 1842, Nelson moved to Woburn, Massachusetts and opened an office in Boston.

Nelson was district attorney of Northern District (which consisted of Essex and Middlesex Counties) from 1845 to 1848, a member of the Massachusetts Senate from 1848 to 1849, and a member of the Massachusetts Governor's Council in 1855. Following the collapse of the Whig Party, Nelson joined the Know Nothings.

In 1855, Nelson was appointed chief justice Suffolk County Superior Court by Governor Henry Gardner in 1855. In 1858, Nelson suffered a stroke which resulted in paralysis and metal impairment that necessitated his commitment to an insane asylum. He died on June 27, 1858, at the McLean Asylum in Somerville, Massachusetts.
