= George Walker (attorney) =

American politician

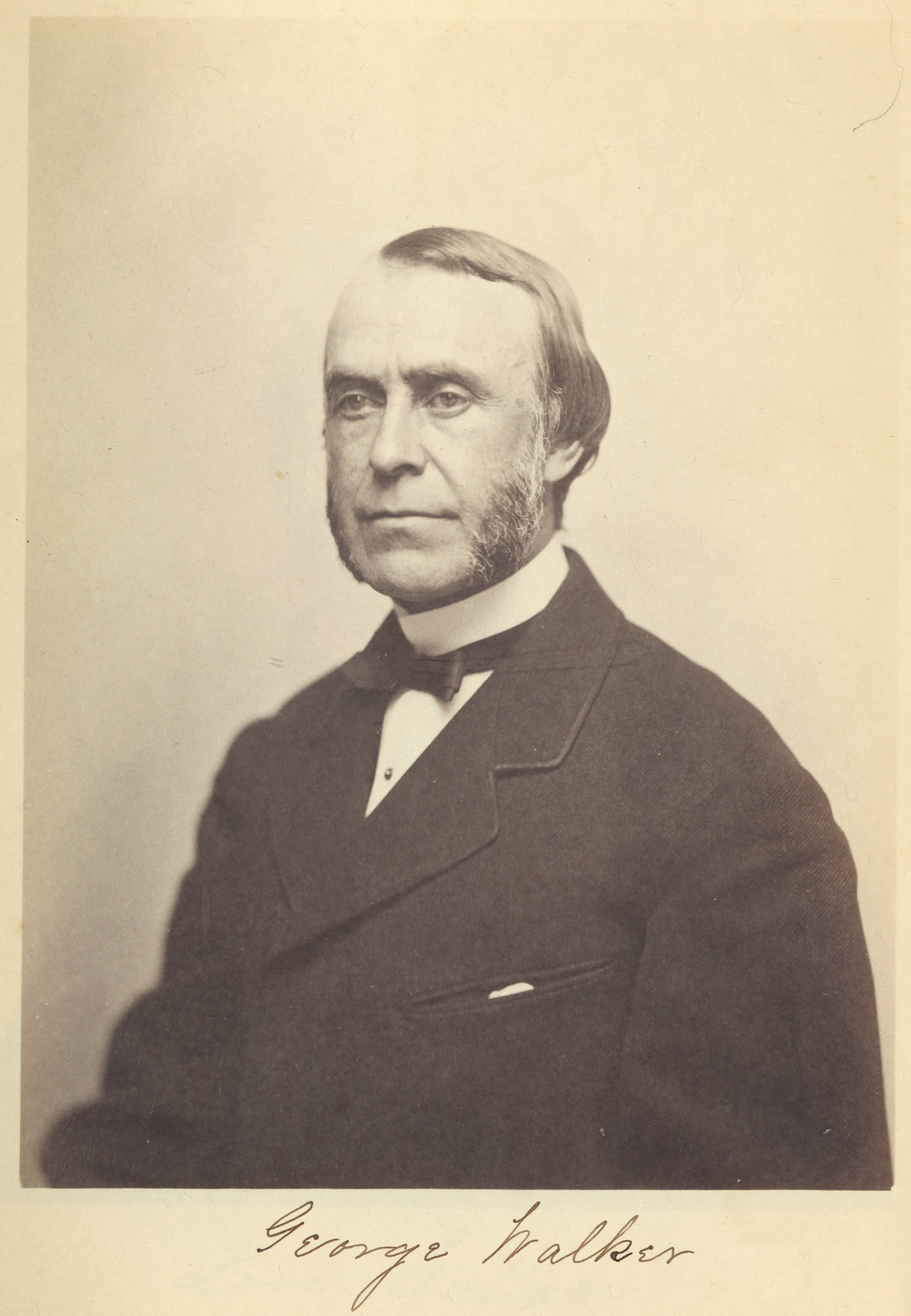
- Massachusetts State Representative George Walker, 1868
- Born: April 1, 1824; Peterborough, New Hampshire
- Died: January 15, 1888 (aged 63); Washington, D.C.
- Occupations: State legislator, banker, corporate executive, diplomat
- Known for: bimetallism advocate

George Walker (1 April 1824 – 15 January 1888) was an attorney and state congressman from Massachusetts, a banker, corporate executive, political adviser, prominent advocate for bimetallism and U.S. Consul-General in Paris.

== Life and career ==
George Walker was born 1 April 1824 in Peterborough, New Hampshire. He graduated from Dartmouth College in 1842 and practiced law in Springfield, Massachusetts from 1847–1875. He was elected to the Massachusetts legislator as a senator in 1857 and served two terms; he was elected again as a representative in 1868, serving a single term.

He was instrumental in bringing the National Banking System to Massachusetts. He was appointed the Massachusetts Banking Commissioner in September 1860, serving until the beginning of 1864 After resigning the Commissionship, in March he founded the federally chartered Third National Bank of Springfield with partner, Frederic H. Harris, and $500,000 in capital.

He resigned his presidency of the bank in Massachusetts to become involved in banking in New York. In 1871 he became vice president of Western Union Telegraph Company and subsequently vice president of the Gold and Stock Telegraph Company.

He was a noted bimetallist, regularly corresponding with U.S. Senator William B. Allison and possibly providing the draft language for the international conference provision of the amendments the Senator made to the Bland–Allison Bill. He was twice sent to Europe on diplomatic missions to investigate the possibility of an international bimetallic agreement, first in 1865 by Treasury Secretary Hugh McCulloch, then in 1879 by Secretary of State William M. Evarts.

He was appointed Consul-General at Paris by President Hayes in 1880 where he served until his resignation in June 1887. In November he moved to Washington, D.C. where he resided at 1306 Connecticut Avenue. He had intended for his stay in Washington, D.C. to be only temporary, having purchased a farm in Exeter, New Hampshire, but early in January contracted pneumonia and died a week later, on 15 January 1888. He is buried in the family plot in Springfield.

== Bibliography ==
=== Selected works by Walker ===
- Walker, George (January 1867). Considerations Touching on Mr. Randall's Bill for the Suppression of the National Banks, and for a Further Inflation of the Currency. Springfield, Mass.: Samuel Bowles & Company, Printers.
- Walker, George (March 1868). "Advantages of the National Banking System of the United States Now in Force". Banker's Magazine and Statistical Register. 2 (Third Series) (9). I. Smith Homans, Jr.: 681–716.

=== References ===
- Marsh, J. Frederic; Forbes, William D.; Walker, George (May 1861). "Banking in Massachusetts: Annual Report of the Bank Commissioners". Banker's Magazine and Statistical Register. 10 (New Series) (11). I. Smith Homans, Jr.: 860–881.
- "Bank Items". Banker's Magazine and Statistical Register. 13 (New Series) (10). I. Smith Homans, Jr.: 827–839 April 1864.
- "Confirmations and Rejections". Evening Star. Vol. 55, no. 8, 380. Washington, D.C. 13 February 1880. p. 1 – via Chronicling America: Historic American Newspapers. Library of Congress.
- "Death of Ex-Consul-General Walker". Evening Star. Vol. 72, no. 10, 814. Washington, D.C. 16 January 1888. p. 1 – via Chronicling America: Historic American Newspapers. Library of Congress.
- Nichols, Jeanette P. (December 1933). "Silver Diplomacy". Political Science Quarterly. 48 (4). Academy of Political Science: 565–588. doi:10.2307/2142930. JSTOR 2142930.
- "Death of Mr. George Walker". Washington Post. Washington, D.C. 16 January 1888.
- Weinstein, Allen (1970). Prelude to Populism: Origins of the Silver Issue, 1867-1878. New Haven, Conn.: Yale University Press. ISBN 0-300-01229-2.
