= Benjamin Pickman Jr. =

American politician (1763–1843)

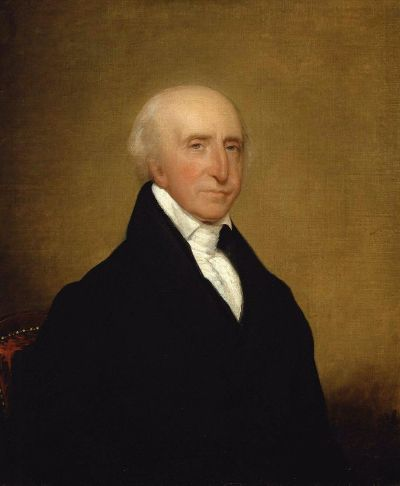
- Portrait by Chester Harding, c. 1843

Member of the U.S. House of Representatives from Massachusetts's 2nd district
- In office March 4, 1809 – March 3, 1811
- Preceded by: Joseph Story
- Succeeded by: William Reed

Member of the Massachusetts House of Representatives
- In office 1797-1802; 1812-1813

Member of the Massachusetts Senate
- In office 1803

Personal details
- Born: September 30, 1763 Salem, Province of Massachusetts Bay, British America
- Died: August 16, 1843 (aged 79) Salem, Massachusetts, U.S.
- Party: Federalist
- Spouse: Anstiss Derby
- Children: Hasket Derby Pickman, Benjamin T. Pickman

Benjamin Pickman Jr. (September 30, 1763 – August 16, 1843) was a U.S. representative from Massachusetts.

== Biography ==
Pickman was born in Salem in the Province of Massachusetts Bay, a descendant of Benjamin Pickman, an Englishman from Bristol. Pickman graduated from Harvard University in 1784 after having attended Dummer Academy (now known as The Governor's Academy). The descendant of a Salem merchant family dynasty related to other prominent Salem families such as the Derbys, the Pickerings and the Crowninshields, Pickman studied law in Newburyport, Massachusetts, and was admitted to the bar, but soon relinquished the practice of law to engage in commercial pursuits, becoming one of the most active merchants of his day in Salem.

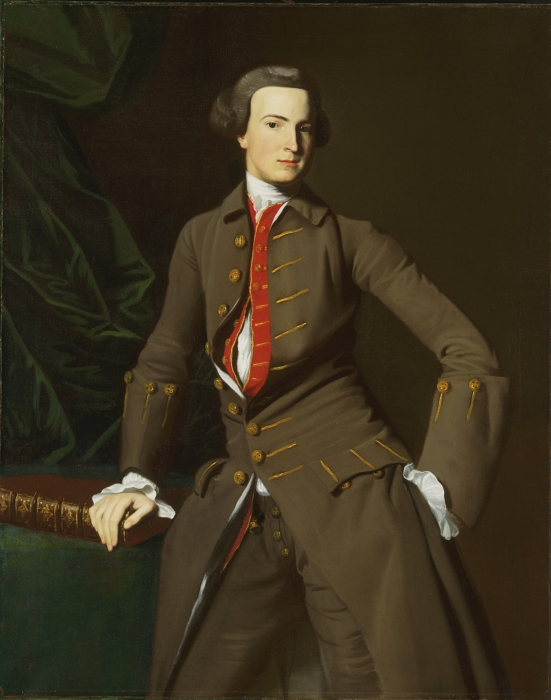
John Singleton Copley, Portrait of Benjamin Pickman, Sr.

Pickman's father Col. Benjamin Pickman, Sr., one of the most important merchants in Salem, had been a Loyalist, his estates confiscated by the Colonial government and was forced to flee America for England, only returning to Salem in 1785 after the end of the Revolutionary War.

Benjamin Pickman Jr., served the new nation in several capacities. He was a member of the Massachusetts House of Representatives in 1797–1802, 1812, and 1813. Benjamin Pickman Jr. also served in the Massachusetts Senate in 1803, as well as a member of the executive council of the State in 1805, 1808, 1813, 1814, and 1819–1821.

Pickman was elected as a Federalist to the Eleventh Congress (March 4, 1809 – March 3, 1811), but he was not a candidate for renomination in 1810. He served as member of the Massachusetts Constitutional Convention of 1820–1821. He served as overseer of Harvard University 1810–1818. He served as president of the board of directors of the Theological School at Cambridge. He died in Salem, Massachusetts, August 16, 1843, and was interred with his Pickman ancestors in Salem's Broad Street Cemetery. He was elected a Fellow of the American Academy of Arts and Sciences in 1815.

Pickman was instrumental in the commercial development of much of the heart of historic Salem. In 1815 he and John Derby III acquired property belonging to Derby family heirs to develop Derby Square, which would encompass three brick commercial rows. The Pickman-Derby Block, built in 1817, still stands. The Pickman Building on Derby Square, built in 1816, was part of the development. The Pickman family also owned Pickman farm. Salem's Pickman Street is named for them.

Benjamin Pickman Jr. was married to Anstiss Derby, daughter of Elias Hasket Derby and Elizabeth Crowninshield. The son of Benjamin Pickman and the former Anstiss Derby was Hasket Derby Pickman, who died in 1815, the same year he graduated from Harvard College.

While he was known as Benjamin Pickman Jr., he was actually the fifth continuous Benjamin in the line. His daughter, Anstiss Derby Pickman, married John Whittingham Rogers. They were the parents of Anstiss Derby Rogers, who married merchant William Shepard Wetmore on September 5, 1843. Their son, George P. Wetmore, was the Governor of Rhode Island and a United States Senator from that state, and their daughter, Annie Derby Rogers Wetmore, married businessman William Watts Sherman. The daughter of Sherman, Georgette Wetmore Sherman, married Harold Brown (Rhode Island financier), son of John Carter Brown and grandson of Nicholas Brown Jr.

Benjamin's niece, Mary Toppan Pickman, married Massachusetts Congressman and diplomat George B. Loring, who is Benjamin's great-nephew through his brother Clark. She is the daughter of Benjamin's brother, Dr. Thomas Pickman. His aunt, Judith Pickman, married physician and scientist Edward Augustus Holyoke.

== See also ==
- Dudley Leavitt Pickman

U.S. House of Representatives
Preceded by Joseph Story	Member of the U.S. House of Representatives from Massachusetts's 2nd congressional district March 4, 1809 – March 3, 1811	Succeeded by William Reed
