= Ebenezer Bradbury =

American politician

21st Treasurer and Receiver-General of Massachusetts
- In office 1849–1851
- Governor: George N. Briggs
- Preceded by: Joseph Barrett
- Succeeded by: Charles B. Hall

Speaker of the Massachusetts House of Representatives
- In office 1847–1847
- Preceded by: John Davis Long
- Succeeded by: Charles J. Noyes

Member of the Massachusetts House of Representatives from Newburyport, Massachusetts, Essex County, Massachusetts

Personal details
- Born: July 31, 1793 Newburyport, Massachusetts
- Died: June 19, 1864 (aged 70) Salisbury, Massachusetts
- Party: Whig
- Occupation: Machinist

Ebenezer Bradbury (July 31, 1793 – June 19, 1864) was a Massachusetts machinist who served as the Treasurer and Receiver-General of Massachusetts and as a member, and the Speaker, of the Massachusetts House of Representatives.

== Early life ==
Bradbury was born in Newburyport, Massachusetts on July 31, 1793.

== Massachusetts House of Representatives ==
Bradbury represented Newburyport, Essex County, Massachusetts in the Massachusetts House of Representatives. Bradbury was the Speaker of the Massachusetts House of Representatives in 1847.

== Massachusetts Treasurer ==
Starting in 1849, Bradbury was the Treasurer and Receiver-General of Massachusetts.

Bradbury lived in Newton, Massachusetts.

== See also ==
- 68th Massachusetts General Court (1847)

Political offices
Preceded by Samuel H. Walley, Jr.	Speaker of the Massachusetts House of Representatives; 1847	Succeeded by Francis Crowninshield
Preceded by Joseph Barrett	21 st Treasurer and Receiver-General of Massachusetts; 1849-1851	Succeeded by Charles B. Hall
