= John Derby Smith =

American politician (1812–1884)

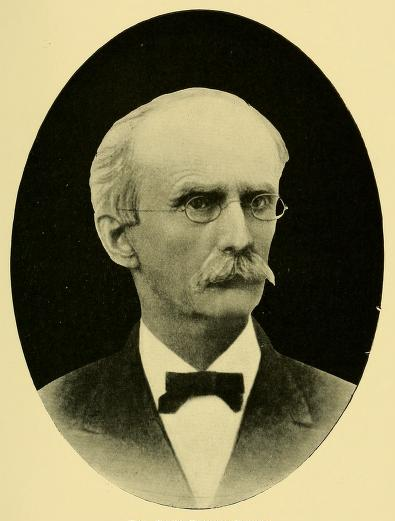
- Portrait of Smith in a 1914 publication

Member of the Massachusetts Legislature
- In office 1854–1854

Personal details
- Born: April 9, 1812 Hanover, New Hampshire, U.S.
- Died: April 26, 1884 (aged 72) Scotland, Bridgewater, Massachusetts, U.S.
- Spouses: Sarah Bacon (m. 1837; died 1848) Mary M. Dole (m. 1849; died 1854) Susan A. Anthony (m. 1855; died 1883)
- Parent: Nathan Smith (father)
- Education: Yale College; Yale Divinity School; Andover Theological Seminary; Baltimore Medical College (MD)
- Occupation: Politician; minister; physician

John Derby Smith (April 9, 1812 – April 26, 1884) was an American minister, medical doctor, and Massachusetts state legislator.

== Early life ==
John Derby Smith was born on April 9, 1812, in Hanover, New Hampshire, as the youngest son of Nathan Smith. His father became the head of the Yale School of Medicine in 1813.

Smith graduated from Yale College in 1832. In 1833, he entered Yale Divinity School and he attended the school for two years. He then attended the Andover Theological Seminary for two years. He became licensed to preach in 1837.

== Career ==
Smith was acting pastor in Athol, Massachusetts. He was ordained pastor of the 2nd Congregational Church in Charlemont, Massachusetts, on November 20, 1839. He continued there until August 11, 1844. Following poor health, he studied medicine and graduated from Baltimore Medical College in 1846 with a Doctor of Medicine. He continued as pastor in Charlemont from June 1848 to May 1852.

Smith served in the Massachusetts Legislature in 1854. He was a pastor in Berkley, Massachusetts, from 1854 to 1858. He was pastor in Douglas, Massachusetts, from 1860 to 1863.

In 1863, Smith joined the Union Army as a contract surgeon. After the Civil War, he was a clerk in the Treasury Department in Washington, D.C. In July 1867, he was appointed as acting assistant surgeon in the United States Navy. He worked for four years at the Naval Hospital in Pensacola, Florida. Due to poor health, he returned home and was placed on the retired list.

== Personal life ==
Smith married Sarah Bacon, daughter of Garry Bacon, of Woodbury, Connecticut, on March 17, 1837. She died in 1848. He married Mary M. Dole of Charlemont on April 22, 1849. She died in 1854. He married Susan A. Anthony, daughter of Dr. J. H. Anthony, of Providence, Rhode Island, on April 12, 1855. She died in 1883. He had many children, including one son who graduated from Yale Medical College.

Smith died of a liver ailment on April 26, 1884, at his home in the village of Scotland, Bridgewater, Massachusetts.
