= Charles F. Swift =

American politician

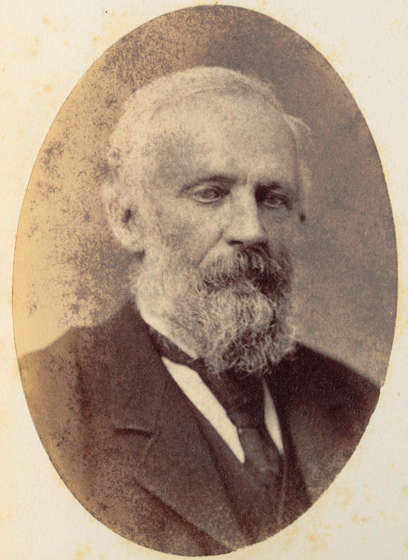
- Charles Swift in 1880

Member of the Massachusetts Senate from the Barnstable County district
- In office January 7, 1857 – January 6, 1858
- Preceded by: Alfred Kenrick
- Succeeded by: District Abolished

Member of the Massachusetts Senate from the Cape district
- In office January 6, 1858 – January 5, 1859
- Preceded by: District Created
- Succeeded by: Marshal S. Underwood

Member of the Massachusetts House of Representatives from the 3rd Barnstable district
- In office January 7, 1880 – January 4, 1882
- Preceded by: Thomas P. Howes
- Succeeded by: David Fisk

Collector of Customs, Barnstable
- In office November 12, 1861 – November 11, 1866
- Preceded by: Joseph M. Day
- Succeeded by: Sylvanus B. Phinney

Collector of Customs, Barnstable
- In office March 2, 1867 – July 8, 1876
- Preceded by: Sylvanus B. Phinney
- Succeeded by: Franklin B. Goss

Personal details
- Born: June 18, 1825 Falmouth, Massachusetts
- Died: May 1, 1903 (aged 77) Yarmouth, Massachusetts
- Party: Republican
- Spouse: Sarah A. Munroe
- Occupation: Newspaper editor and publisher

Charles Francis Swift (June 18, 1825 – May 1, 1903) was an American state politician and newspaper editor from Massachusetts. He served in the Massachusetts Senate, Massachusetts House of Representatives and was also collector of customs for the district of Barnstable.

== Early life ==
Swift was born in Falmouth, Massachusetts and was educated at the local school. In 1839, aged 14, he began work in a printing office and by 1847 was assistant editor of The Yarmouth Register. He became editor in 1850, a position he held until his death. The Register was originally a Whig newspaper and was strongly anti-slavery. It subsequently supported the Republican Party, of which Swift was one of the leading lights in Barnstable county. Swift served as president of the Yarmouth Library Association, the Cape Cod Historical Society and the Barnstable County Agricultural Society. He was elected treasurer of the county of Barnstable in 1851, and subsequently re-elected three times.

== State Legislature ==
In the November 1856 election, Swift was elected as state senator for the Barnstable County district, alongside John W. Atwood. In an eight man contest, Swift topped the poll with 24.2% of the vote. The following year the state was redistricted, with the new Cape district only entitled to one senator. Swift stood in the new district against two other candidates. He was duly re-elected with 52% of the vote. While in the senate he served on the committee on fisheries, election laws and the libraries, and was appointed chairman of the joint special committee on the pilotage laws. In November 1861 he was appointed collector of customs for the district of Barnstable by President Lincoln, a post he held for 15 years, apart from four months between November 1866 and March 1867. In 1880 he ran for election to the state House of Representatives for the 3rd district of Barnstable county, which covered the towns of Yarmouth and Dennis. He was elected with 59% of the vote in a three man field. He ran for re-election in 1881, and won an overwhelming 99.1% of the vote. For both years he served as Chairman of the Committee on Prisons and on the Library. In his second term he served on the joint special committee for the revision of the laws of the Commonwealth.

== Personal life ==
Swift married Sarah A. Munroe of Barnstable in 1852. They had seven children: Hannah, Francis, Fred, Theodore, Caroline, Sarah and Charles. He wrote a number of historical works, among them the History of Old Yarmouth and the History of Cape Cod. He died on May 1, 1903, at his home in Yarmouth, Massachusetts.
