= Benjamin T. Pickman =

American politician

Benjamin Toppan Pickman

Member of the Massachusetts Senate from the Suffolk district

President of the Massachusetts Senate
- In office January 1833 – March 12, 1835
- Preceded by: William Thorndike
- Succeeded by: George Bliss

President of the Boston Common Council
- In office January 4, 1830 – January 2, 1832
- Preceded by: Eliphalet Williams
- Succeeded by: John Prescott Bigelow

Member of the Boston Common Council from Ward 7
- In office August 6, 1828 – January 2, 1832
- Preceded by: Thoma Wren Ward
- Succeeded by

Personal details
- Born: 1790 Salem, Massachusetts
- Died: March 12, 1835 (aged 44–45)
- Spouse: Hannah Bright

Benjamin Toppan Pickman (1790 – March 12, 1835), was a Massachusetts politician who served as President of the Massachusetts Senate, a member of the Massachusetts House of Representatives and as a member and president of the Boston Common Council.

Pickman was the son of Massachusetts Congressman Benjamin Pickman, Jr.

== See also ==
- 54th Massachusetts General Court (1833)
- 55th Massachusetts General Court (1834)
- 56th Massachusetts General Court (1835)

== Notes ==
Massachusetts Senate
Preceded by William Thorndike	President of the Massachusetts Senate; 1833 – 1835	Succeeded by George Bliss
Political offices
Preceded by Eliphalet Williams	President of the Boston Common Council; January 4, 1830 – January 2, 1832	Succeeded by John Prescott Bigelow
