= 1817–1818 Massachusetts legislature =

American state legislature

38th Massachusetts General Court
| ← | 37th | 39th | → |

Overview
- Legislative body: General Court
- Term: May 1817 – May 1818

Senate
- Members: 40
- President: John Phillips

House
- Speaker: Timothy Bigelow

The 38th Massachusetts General Court, consisting of the Massachusetts Senate and the Massachusetts House of Representatives, met in 1817 and 1818 during the governorship of John Brooks. John Phillips served as president of the Senate and Timothy Bigelow served as speaker of the House. On February 10, 1818, the General Court issued the corporate charter for the Suffolk Bank to a group of the Boston Associates (including Patrick Tracy Jackson and Daniel Pinckney Parker).

== Senators ==
- William B. Bannister
- Israel Bartlett
- Solomon Bates
- Joseph Bemis
- Thomas H. Blood
- Peter Bryant.
- James Campbell
- Nehemiah Cleveland
- Oliver Crosby
- Samuel Dana
- James Ellis
- John Endicott
- Solomon Freeman
- John Hart
- Mark L. Hill
- James Howland 2d
- Elihu Hoyt
- James Humphreys
- Jonathan Hunewell
- Samuel Lathrop
- Archelaus Lewis
- William Moody
- John Moore
- Daniel Noble
- Thomas H. Perkins
- John Phillips
- Dudley L. Pickman
- Samuel Porter
- Josiah Quincy
- Alexander Rice
- Elisha Ruggles
- Leverett Saltonstall
- David Stockbridge
- Richard Sullivan
- Joseph B. Varnum
- Daniel Waldo
- John Welles
- John Whiting
- W. D. Williamson

== Representatives ==
- Stephen Codman
- Josiah Bachelder
- Benjamin Russell
- Thomas W. Sumner
- Benjamin Whitman
- Charles Davis
- William H. Sumner
- William Tudor jun.
- John D. Howard
- Jonathan Loring
- Thomas Barry
- Henry Sargent
- Benjamin Gorham
- John Howe
- Benjamin Whitwell
- Benjamin Smith
- John Cotton
- Josiah Marshall
- John Mackay
- Peter O. Thacher
- Joseph W. Revere
- Samuel Hubbard
- Benjamin Rand
- John French
- Josiah Bradlee
- David Sears
- Edward T. Channing
- Samuel Swett
- Francis Bassett

== See also ==
- 15th United States Congress
- List of Massachusetts General Courts
