= City Club =

City Club may refer to:

== American civic organizations ==
- Capital City Club (est. 1883) in Atlanta, Georgia
- City Club of Chicago (est. 1903) in Illinois
- City Club of Cleveland (est. 1912) in Ohio
- City Club of New York (est. 1892) in New York
- City Club of Portland (est. 1916) in Oregon
- Women's City Club (disambiguation), multiple organizations

== Other ==
- City Club (wholesale club), a Mexican retailer
- Berkeley City Club, a historic building in Berkeley, California
- City Club (album), a 2016 album by the California rock band The Growlers
- City Club (football), a football club in Mirpur, Bangladesh
- City Club (cricket), a cricket club in Mirpur, Bangladesh

== See also ==
- City FC (disambiguation)
