= 1815–1816 Massachusetts legislature =

American state legislature

36th Massachusetts General Court
| ← | 35th | 37th | → |

Overview
- Legislative body: General Court
- Term: May 1815 – May 1816

Senate
- Members: 40
- President: John Phillips

House
- Speaker: Timothy Bigelow

The 36th Massachusetts General Court, consisting of the Massachusetts Senate and the Massachusetts House of Representatives, met in 1815 and 1816 during the governorship of Caleb Strong. John Phillips served as president of the Senate and Timothy Bigelow served as speaker of the House.

== Senators ==
- Jacob Abbot
- Benjamin Adams
- Joseph Bemis
- James Campbell
- Timothy Child
- Nehemiah Cleveland
- Thaddeus Coffin
- Samuel Crocker
- Oliver Crosby
- William Crosby
- James Ellis
- Solomon Freeman
- Timothy Fuller
- Joshua Gage
- John Hart
- Mark L. Hill
- Sam’l Hoar
- Silas Holman
- John Holmes
- Nathaniel Hooper
- Stephen Hooper
- John Howe
- Jonathan Hunnewell
- Samuel Lathrop
- Lathrop Lewis
- William Moody
- Harrison G. Otis
- Elijah Paine
- Thomas H. Perkins
- John Phillips
- John Pickering
- Josiah Quincy
- William Read
- Moses Smith
- Ezra Starkweather
- Thomas Stephens
- Richard Sullivan
- William P. Walker
- Thomas Weston
- Wilkes Wood

== Representatives ==
- William Smith

== See also ==
- 14th United States Congress
- List of Massachusetts General Courts
