= 1814–1815 Massachusetts legislature =

American state legislature

35th Massachusetts General Court
←	34th	36th	→

Overview
- Legislative body: General Court
- Term: May 1814 – May 1815

Senate
- Members: 40
- President: John Phillips

House
- Speaker: Timothy Bigelow

The 35th Massachusetts General Court, consisting of the Massachusetts Senate and the Massachusetts House of Representatives, met in 1814 and 1815 during the governorship of Caleb Strong. John Phillips served as president of the Senate and Timothy Bigelow served as speaker of the House.

== Senators ==
- Jacob Abbot
- Benjamin Adams
- S. C. Allen
- Joseph Bemis
- Francis Blake
- Sylvester Brownell
- James Campbell
- Samuel Crocker
- Wendell Davis
- Walter Folger Jr.
- Edmund Foster
- Timothy Fuller
- Joshua Gage
- Mark L. Hill
- Samuel Hoar
- Silas Holman
- John Holmes
- Nathaniel Hooper
- John Howe
- Wolcott Hubbel
- Martin Kinsley
- Sam Lathrop
- Lothrop Lewis
- Elij. H. Mills
- William Moody
- Harrison G. Otis
- Albion K. Parris
- Thomas H. Perkins
- John Phillips
- Samuel Putnam
- Josiah Quincy
- Daniel Sargent
- Moses Smith
- Thomas Stephens
- Israel Thorndike
- John Varnum
- Daniel A. White
- Joseph Whiton
- Wilkes Wood

== See also ==
- 13th United States Congress
- 14th United States Congress
- List of Massachusetts General Courts
