= Exchange Coffee House, Boston =

Hotel and coffeehouse in Boston

Coordinates: 42°21′29.76″N 71°3′24.64″W

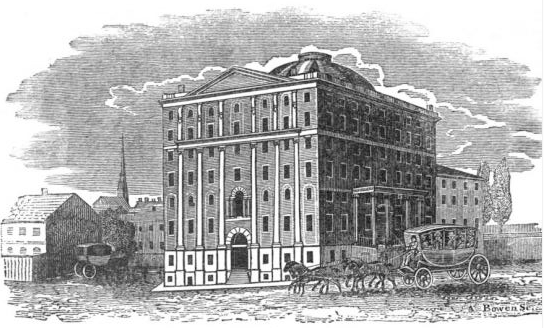
Exchange Coffee House, Boston (engraving by Abel Bowen)

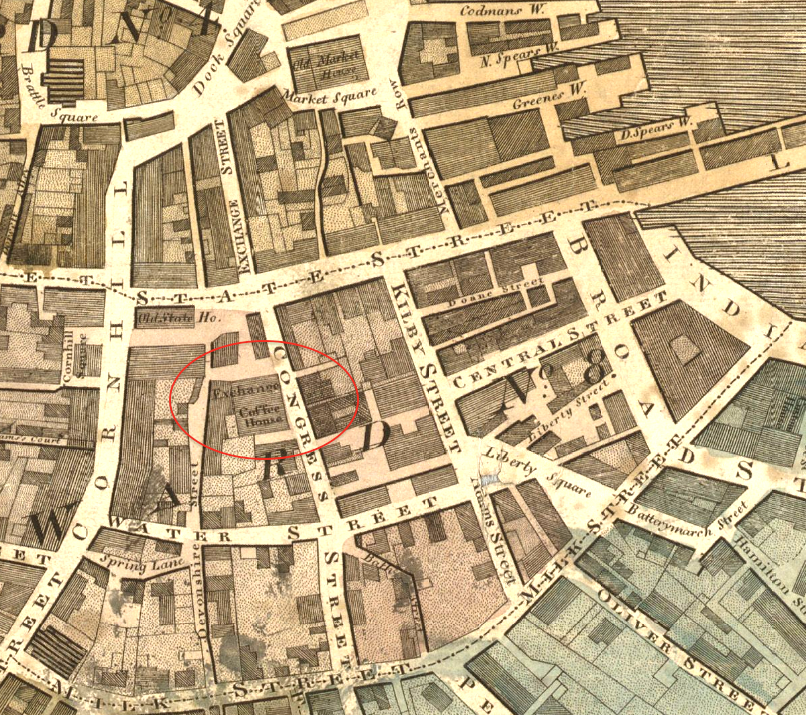
Detail of map of Boston in 1814, showing location of Exchange Coffee House

The Exchange Coffee House (1809–1818) was a hotel, coffeehouse, and place of business in Boston, Massachusetts, in the early 19th century.

== History ==
Designed by architect Asher Benjamin, the Exchange Coffee House was located at Congress Square on Congress Street, and in its day it was the largest building in Boston and one of the tallest buildings in the northeastern United States. Andrew Dexter Jr. financed the project. Dexter resorted to financial fraud to see the construction to completion, and fled to Nova Scotia to escape prosecution and his creditors.

The Exchange Coffee House stood seven stories high and contained a five-story atrium. There were more than 200 rooms, including sleeping chambers, the public parts of the hotel, and kitchen facilities.

The completed building passed to a succession of owners, who attempted to run it profitably, including Gilbert & Dean.

The Exchange Coffee House burned down in November 1818. Its owners and financial backers lost most of their investment, amounting to hundreds of thousands of dollars.

== Events ==
- 1809 - Fencing demonstration by Tromelle & Girard
- 1810
  - June 26: Two notable Boston musicians of the time, François Mallet and Gottlieb Graupner, presented a concert at the Exchange Coffee House featuring "all the Musicians of the town".
  - December: Mr. Rannie, ventriloquist
- 1815 - Exhibit of the "panorama of the Battle of Leipsic"
- 1817 - Sculpture exhibit assembled by "Petre Alessandri, sculptor, lately arrived from Italy"
- 1818
  - February 27: A group of the Boston Associates (including Patrick Tracy Jackson and Daniel Pinckney Parker) met at the Exchange Coffee House to discuss organizing the Suffolk Bank, a clearinghouse bank which had been granted its corporate charter by the 38th Massachusetts General Court on February 10. The bank's directors continued meeting periodically at the Coffee House until March 19, when they began renting offices on State Street.

== Bibliography ==
- Berger, Molly W. (2011). Hotel Dreams: Luxury, Technology, and Urban Ambition in America, 1829−1929. Baltimore: Johns Hopkins University Press. ISBN 978-0-8018-9987-4.
- Jane Kamensky (2008). The Exchange Artist: A Tale of High-Flying Speculation and America's First Banking Collapse. Viking. ISBN 978-0-670-01841-3.
- Sandoval-Strausz, A. K. (2007). Hotel: An American Story. New Haven: Johns Hopkins University Press. ISBN 978-0-300-14202-0.
- Williamson, Jefferson (1930). The American Hotel: An Anecdotal History. New York: Alfred A. Knopf.
