= Women's City Club =

Women's City Club may refer to:

- Detroit Women's City Club
- Saint Paul Women's City Club
- Women's City Club of New York
- Women's City Club of Boston
- Women's City Club of Chicago
- Women's City Club of Washington, D.C.

== See also ==
- City Club (disambiguation)
