= Thomas Gold Appleton =

American poet

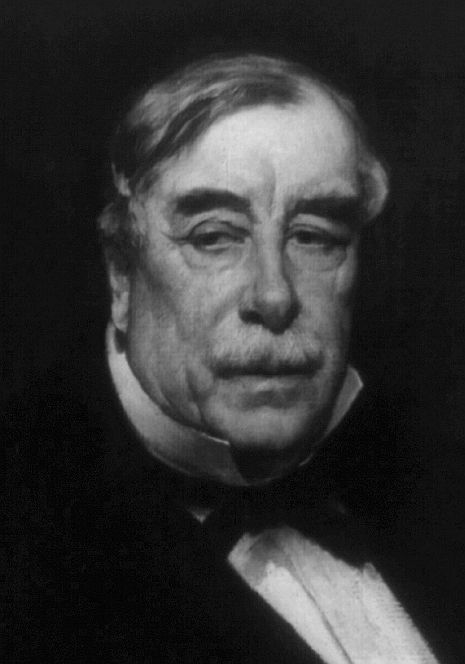
- Photograph of a 1912 painting of Appleton by Frederic Porter Vinton
- Born: March 31, 1812; Boston, Massachusetts, US
- Died: April 17, 1884 (aged 72); New York, US
- Occupations: Writer; artist
- Father: Nathan Appleton
- Relatives: Appleton family

Signature
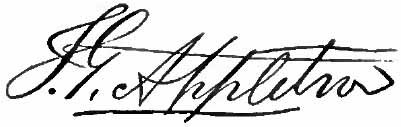

Thomas Gold Appleton (March 31, 1812 – April 17, 1884), son of merchant Nathan Appleton and Maria Theresa Gold, was an American writer, an artist, and a patron of the fine arts. Henry Wadsworth Longfellow became his brother-in-law after marrying Appleton's sister Frances.

== Biography ==
Appleton was born on March 31, 1812, in Boston, Massachusetts; he would later joke that he just missed being born an April fool. He graduated from Harvard College in 1831 and in October 1838 was admitted to the bar in Suffolk County, Massachusetts; he set up his office on Tremont Row. He became known for his witticisms, one of which, the oft-quoted "Good Americans, when they die, go to Paris", is sometimes attributed to Oliver Wendell Holmes. Appleton and Holmes met in 1833 on their way to Paris.

Appleton befriended the poet and professor Henry Wadsworth Longfellow during a trip to Europe in the 1830s; the two became close friends. Later, back in Massachusetts, Appleton encouraged Longfellow to pursue his sister Frances Appleton. In fact, Frances took several years before she was convinced to marry Longfellow; in the meantime, Thomas Appleton maintained a good friendship with Longfellow. When Appleton prepared for a trip to Europe, Frances implied that she would need company in his absence, suggesting she had consented to marriage. The couple's wedding in 1843 was held at the Appleton home in Beacon Hill.

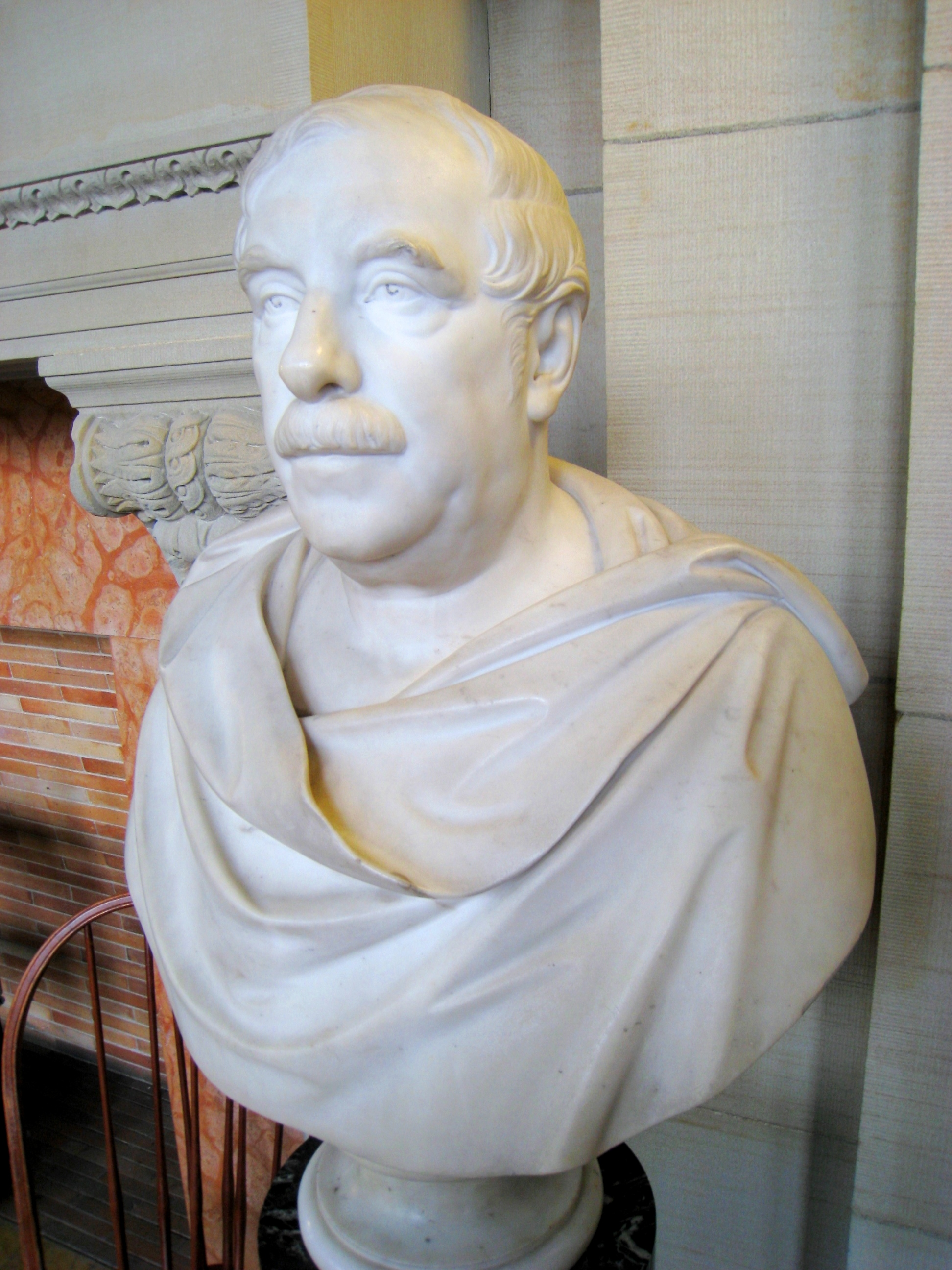
Bust of Thomas Gold Appleton at the Boston Public Library

Appleton spent much of his life traveling. As he wrote, "More and more the world needs, and learns to value, its vacation". He visited Niagara Falls in 1842, for example. On another vacation in the 1840s, Appleton met Horace Mann and took him dancing at the Champs-Élysées in Paris. He wrote to his brother-in-law, "You may conceive the length of face with which the leader of Normal instructors contemplated the Can-Can". Also in Paris, Appleton developed an interest in spiritualism and mesmerism.

Attempting a career as an artist, Appleton was disappointed by his prospects. In a letter to his father in July 1844, he wrote:

You know as well as I do, that my life, the life of an artist (and how alone am I, ashamed of the name) counts for nothing in this country... Do you suppose... I am fool enough to call myself a painter or a poet? The short and long of it is, that I have not any of the kind of talent needful to success here. It is a melancholy confession but true.

In addition to art, Appleton tried his hand at poetry. The winter of 1842, he had been writing a tragedy in blank verse. Writing a tragedy was considered unusual by his friends, who knew Appleton for his humor, referring to him as "T. G. Appleton, the Boston wit".

On his return to the United States, Appleton became a member of the board of trustees of the Boston Public Library, a position he held from 1852 to 1856. He purchased a Greek Revival home near the Longfellows' home in Cambridge, Massachusetts on October 1, 1857. His sister Frances described it: "Although snug, it is very pleasing".

His sister died after accidentally catching fire in July 1861; Appleton was in Nahant, Massachusetts at the time and was very affected by her death. He never had children of his own, but set out to help care for his nieces and nephews. He allowed the oldest of Longfellow's children, Charles, to borrow his yacht for a trip across the Atlantic Ocean in 1866. He took the girls on daily drives in his carriage, noting that they were "cheerful and happy" when they went out.

Appleton sold his house in Cambridge on March 1, 1864, for slightly less than the $7,600 he had paid for it.

Appleton published some poems and, in prose, Nile Journal (1876), Syrian Sunshine (1877), Windfalls (1878), Chequer-Work (1879).

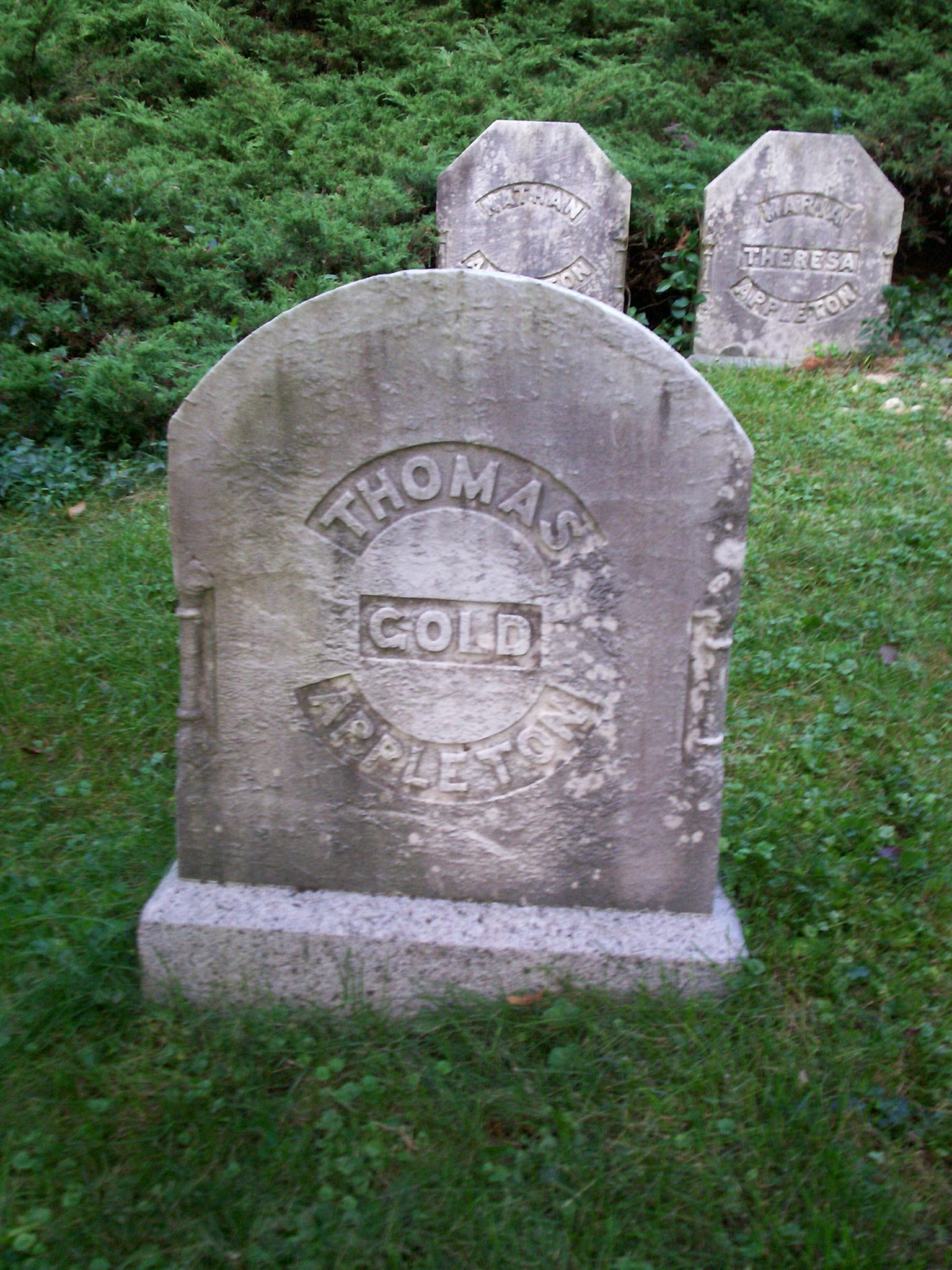
Grave of Thomas Gold Appleton in Mount Auburn Cemetery

In April 1884, while in New York, Appleton developed pneumonia. The Longfellows came to see him and, though he was aware he would die, Appleton was cheerful. "How interesting all this is," he said. "It will be a new experience".

Appleton died on April 17, 1884. His friend Oliver Wendell Holmes wrote a memorial to him in The Atlantic Monthly: "The city seems grayer and older since he left us, the cold spring wind coming from the bay, harsher and more unfriendly." He is buried in a family plot at Mount Auburn Cemetery in Cambridge, Massachusetts.

== Selected list of works ==
- Faded Leaves (1872)
- Fresh Leaves (1874)
- Nile Journal (1876)
- Syrian Sunshine (1877)
- Windfalls (1878)
- Chequer-Work (1879)
