= 1816–1817 Massachusetts legislature =

37th Massachusetts General Court

37th Massachusetts General Court
←	36th	38th	→

Overview
- Legislative body: General Court
- Term: May 1816 – May 1817

Senate
- Members: 40
- President: John Phillips

House
- Speaker: Timothy Bigelow

The 37th Massachusetts General Court, consisting of the Massachusetts Senate and the Massachusetts House of Representatives, met in 1816 and 1817 during the governorship of John Brooks. John Phillips served as president of the Senate and Timothy Bigelow served as speaker of the House.

== Senators ==
- Israel Bartlett
- Joseph Bemis
- Thomas H. Blood
- James Campbell
- Nehemiah Cleveland
- Samuel Crocker
- Oliver Crosby
- James Ellis
- Solomon Freeman
- Timothy Fuller
- Mark Harris
- John Hart
- Mark L. Hill
- Samuel Hoar
- Silas Holman
- John Holmes
- Stephen Hooper
- John Howe
- Levi Hubbard
- Jonathan Hunewell
- Caleb Hyde
- Samuel Lathrop
- William Moody
- Harrison G. Otis
- Elijah Paine
- Isaac Parsons
- Thomas H. Perkins
- John Phillips
- John Pickering
- Dudley L. Pickman
- Josiah Quincy
- Ezra Starkweather
- Richard Sullivan
- Charles Turner Jr.
- Daniel Waldo
- Eben. T. Warren
- Thomas Weston
- John Whiting
- Ephraim Williams
- W. D. Williamson

== See also ==
- 14th United States Congress
- 15th United States Congress
- List of Massachusetts General Courts
