= Daniel Pinckney Parker =

American businessman (1781–1850)

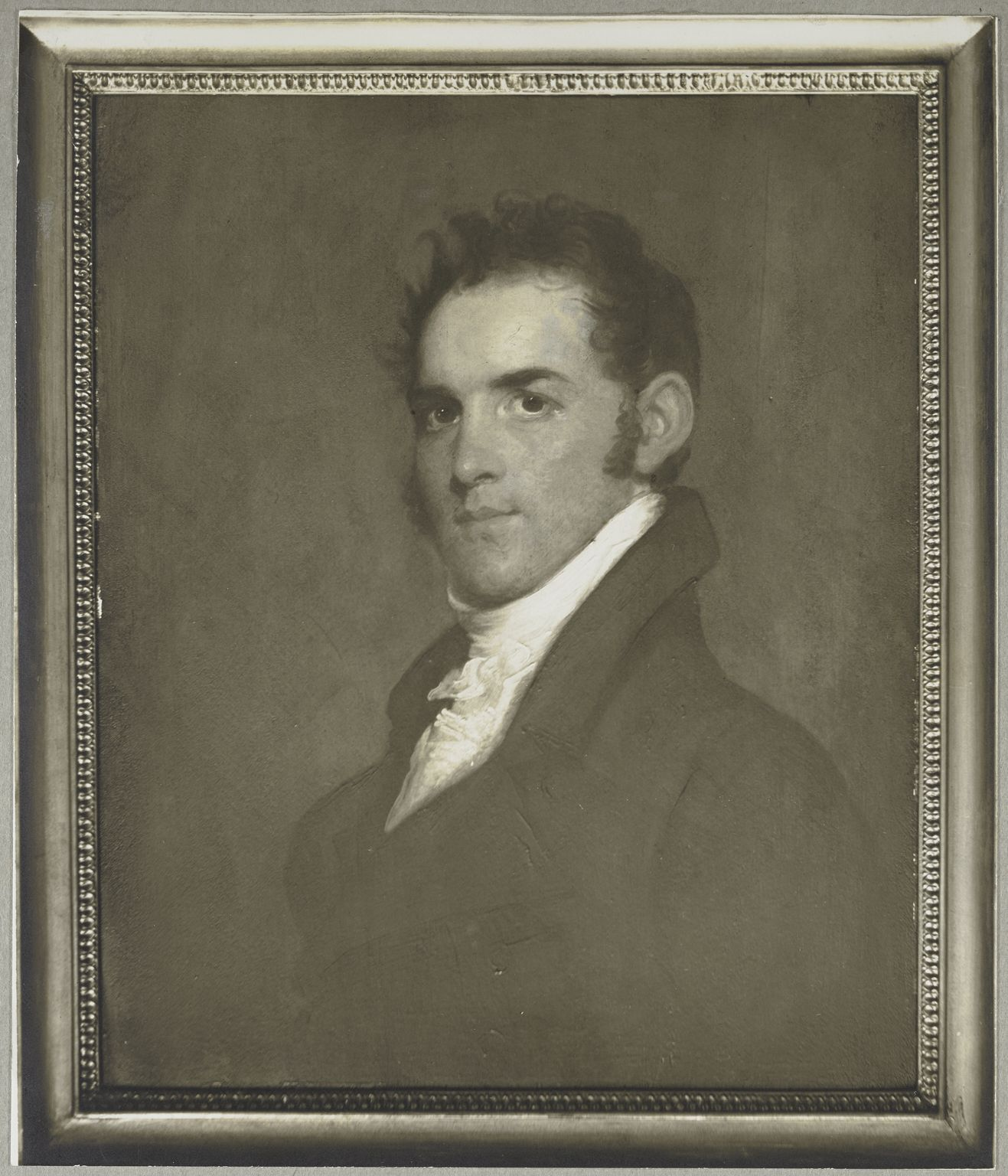
- portrait by Gilbert Stuart, 1813
- Born: August 30, 1781; Southborough
- Died: August 31, 1850 (aged 69); Boston
- Occupation: Merchant

Daniel Pinckney Parker (August 30, 1781 – August 31, 1850) was an American merchant, shipbuilder, and businessman in 19th-century Boston, Massachusetts.

== Biography ==
Daniel Pinckney Parker was born on August 30, 1781, in Southborough, Massachusetts, to Benjamin and Abigail (Taylor) Parker. Following an apprenticeship as a store clerk in Marlborough, Massachusetts, Parker moved to Boston in 1810 and entered into partnership with Nathan Appleton under the name Parker & Appletons, until 1813.

== Family ==
On December 8, 1806, Parker married Mary Weeks of Marlborough, Massachusetts. The Parkers had four children: Lucilla Pinckney, Mary, Henry Tuke, and Emily Taylor. The oldest, Lucilla Pinckney Parker, was born in Boston in 1810 and eventually married the lawyer and noted abolitionist Edmund Quincy, the son of Harvard University President Josiah Quincy.

The Parkers only son, Henry Tuke Parker, graduated from Harvard University in 1842, and from Harvard Law School in 1845 before moving permanently to London, England, where he became a writer and member of the Royal Geographical Society of London.

== Home ==
The shipping magnate's home was listed in Adam's Boston Directory of 1846 and 1847 as 40 Beacon Street. The house there was designed by the important Boston architect Alexander Parris, who is noted for having built United First Parish Church in Quincy, Massachusetts, Pilgrim Hall in Plymouth, Massachusetts, and Somerset Club in Boston. The property on which the Parker residence was built formerly belonged to famed Boston painter John Singleton Copley.

The home later became known as the Nathan Appleton Residence or Appleton-Parker House, in combined recondition with its neighbor, #39, and home of Parker's early business partner and friend Nathan Appleton. The home is now considered a National Historic Landmark.

In more recent years, the Appleton-Parker House has attracted attention as the one-time home of former General Electric CEO Jack Welch and for having been listed on a number of occasions with a considerable asking price.

Parker's business offices were at one point listed at 40 State Street, in Boston.

== Business ==
Parker, who had been close with the merchant and philanthropist Samuel Appleton, as well as his brother Nathan Appleton, is noted for having owned the famed Samuel Appleton ship, which was said to be one of the finest in Boston, measuring approximately 800 tons. That ship was primarily used for trade with China, and regularly made trips from Boston, around the Cape Horn, to San Francisco, California, and then to China. Parker was also the owner of the mercantile cargo sailing ship Zenobia.

Although primarily involved in shipping, Parker's business endeavors were far reaching and quickly established him amongst Boston's most successful and influential businessmen. In 1813, Parker was a member of a consortium, which included businessmen Josiah White and Isaac Wright, that established The Plympton Cotton Factory Company, for the purpose of "... manufacturing cotton, wool and linen yarn and cloth, in Plympton, in the county of Plymouth."

Parker also served as a Director of the Office of Discount and Deposit Boston branch of the Bank of the United States, a record of which was engraved in a silver plate and deposited in the foundation of the bank as it was being designed and built by architect Solomon Willard on State Street in 1816. In part thanks to his established reputation following Willard's completion of the Bunker Hill Monument, Parker wrote specifically of his confidence in the architect in a letter to John Collins Warren dated October 8, 1825.

On February 10, 1818, Parker, Patrick Tracy Jackson, and other members of the Boston Associates, were granted the charter of the Suffolk Bank by the Massachusetts General Court. Parker, Jackson, the other charter's holders, and the bank's directors met periodically from February 27 to March 19 at the Boston Exchange Coffee House to discuss the organization of the bank. On April 1, 1818, the bank opened for business in rented offices on State Street until the bank moved permanently to the corner of State and Kilby Streets (currently occupied by either 75 State Street or Exchange Place) on April 17. Parker owned 300 shares of the bank.

Daniel Parker was recorded in the Acts and Resolves passed by the General Court section of the Private and Special Statutes of the Commonwealth of Massachusetts of 1822 as incorporating the Mashapog Turnpike Corporation "... for the purpose of locating, making and keeping in good repair, a turnpike road, from Norton meeting-house, in the county of Bristol, to the third school house, (so called) in the town of Canton, in the county of Norfolk, on the most direct and convenient route ...."

As of 1831 Parker's various business roles included: Director of the Office of Discount and Deposit Boston branch of the Bank of the United States, Director of the Columbian Insurance Company, Director of the Massachusetts Hospital Life Insurance Company, along with his friends Samuel Appleton and Nathan Appleton, and as Trustee of Provident Institution for Savings in the Town of Boston.

== Herman Melville ==
Amongst Daniel Parker's closest friends and colleagues, many of them the Boston's most established and successful businessmen and public servants, was the Chief Justice of the Massachusetts Supreme Court, Lemeul Shaw. Shaw had, early on in his developing career, rented rooms from Parker, and counted amongst his own close friends the Melvilles of Boston. In 1847, the budding author Herman Melville married the judge's stepdaughter, Elizabeth Shaw. Parker is believed to have attended their wedding.

Parker had his own ties with the Melvilles and was a trusted friend of Allan Melville, the father of the famous writer. The merchant had accompanied an eight-year-old Herman from Boston to Bristol, Rhode Island, in 1828 to spend their respective summer vacations. In 1843 upon his return from a whaling exhibition in the Pacific, the young Melville is believed to have called on Parker in an effort to resume any friendship that had developed prior to Melville's exploits on the sea. When Melville was married in 1847 and special arrangements were taken to avoid a public mobbing due to his popularity, the author is believed to have stayed with the Parkers.

In 1848 Melville wrote to Parker in hopes of securing a position on one of his ships for his youngest brother, Tom. In a letter from Melville's wife, Elizabeth Shaw Melville, to her step-mother, the family friend Parker poses as the best option for a young man in the often treacherous shipping business; “Herman has written Mr. Parker – (Daniel P.) to see if he can send him out in one of his ships. I hope he will, if Tom must go, for Mr. Parker would be likely to take an interest in him and promote him.” Mrs. Melville continued in a postscript; “If father should chance to see Mr. Parker I wish he would speak to him about Tom.”

== Culture ==
As a prominent member of Boston's society, Parker found himself inevitably immersed in the city's cultural organizations. In 1815 Parker was listed as a Trustee of the Boston Athenaeum, in 1826 was noted to have contributed $100, and in the years ranging 1821, 1844, and 1850 was noted as a subscriber and proprietor. Parker was also one of a number of patrons and trustees that contributed to the commission of the first painting to join the Atheneum's collection; a portrait of the organizations benefactor James Perkins by Gilbert Stuart.

Daniel Pinckney Parker himself, along with his wife, had his portraits painted by Stuart. The University of Southern California currently has in its collection the Gilbert Stuart panel painting "Mrs. Daniel Pinckney Parker (Mary Weekes)", which dates to approximately 1810, when the sitter was 18 years old, and a few years after the young couples 1806 marriage.

Later, in 1847, Parker was elected a member of the New England Historic Genealogical Society.

Daniel P. Parker's wife, Mary Weekes, also held her own prominent position as president of the Fragment Society, the oldest continuous sewing circle in Boston's history, in the years 1838, 1849, 1850, and 1852.

Even in the year of his death, 1850, Parker continued his philanthropic endeavors, contributing to the purchase of protective casing for and cataloging of the George Washington Library at the Boston Athenaeum.

== Death ==
Following “a painful illness of several months”, Daniel Pinckney Parker died at his home on Beacon Street on August 31, 1850, one day after his sixty-ninth birthday. Parker's obituary in the Boston Daily Atlas read as follows:

"Among the many public-spirited merchants who have contributed to extend the commercial enterprise of Boston, few have been more zealous or successful. He had built for him nearly forty sailing vessels, and no man fitted his ships more liberally or took greater interest in the welfare of those in his employ. He was liberal in his charities without being ostentatious, was an affectionate husband, a kind father, and an upright citizen."

Daniel Pinckney Parker is buried at the Mount Auburn Cemetery in Cambridge, Massachusetts.
