= David Sears =

David Sears is the name of:

- David Sears (America) (1787–1871), Boston philanthropist, merchant, and landowner
- David Sears (racing driver) (born 1955), former racing driver
- David O. Sears (born 1935), social and political psychologist, professor at the University of California, Los Angeles
- Dave Sears, assistant general manager of the Arizona Cardinals
- David Sears, American former boxer, two-time world championship challenger

== See also ==
- David Sears House
