= Zenobia (1836 ship) =

History

United States
- Name: Zenobia
- Owner: Daniel Pinckney Parker, Boston
- Builder: J. Stetson, Medford, MA
- Launched: 1836
- Fate: Wrecked April 20, 1858

General characteristics
- Class & type: Full-rigged ship
- Tons burthen: 630 tons

Zenobia was full-rigged ship built in Medford, Massachusetts, in 1837. She was known for transporting a cargo of ice from Sitka, Alaska, to San Francisco, California.

== Voyages under Capt. Lovejoy ==
Captain H. B. Lovejoy, mate of Zenobia, was for many years a well-known maritime pilot on Puget Sound. He was born in Maine in 1805, spent the early part of his life after leaving home in the United States Navy, and came to the United States Pacific Coast in 1849. After a short stay in the mines he began sailing out of San Francisco to southern ports. He was for several years master of the bark Chalcedony, a famous northern trader in her day, and in 1858 was in the service of the Russian-American Trading Company, running between San Francisco and Alaska on Zenobia. He continued in this service until Zenobia was wrecked near San Francisco, when he went to Puget Sound and commenced piloting and steamboating. He died at Coupeville. Washington Territory, on July 6, 1872.

== Loss of the ship ==
Zenobia, which had been sailing between Alaska and San Francisco in the service of the Russian-American Ice Company for several years, was lost off Point Bonita, California, on April 20, 1858, while attempting to sail into the entrance to San Francisco Bay without a pilot. She was under the command of Captain Tilden, was deeply loaded with ice. and struck a rock with such force that she became a complete wreck.
