= Nathan Appleton =

American merchant and politician (1779–1861)

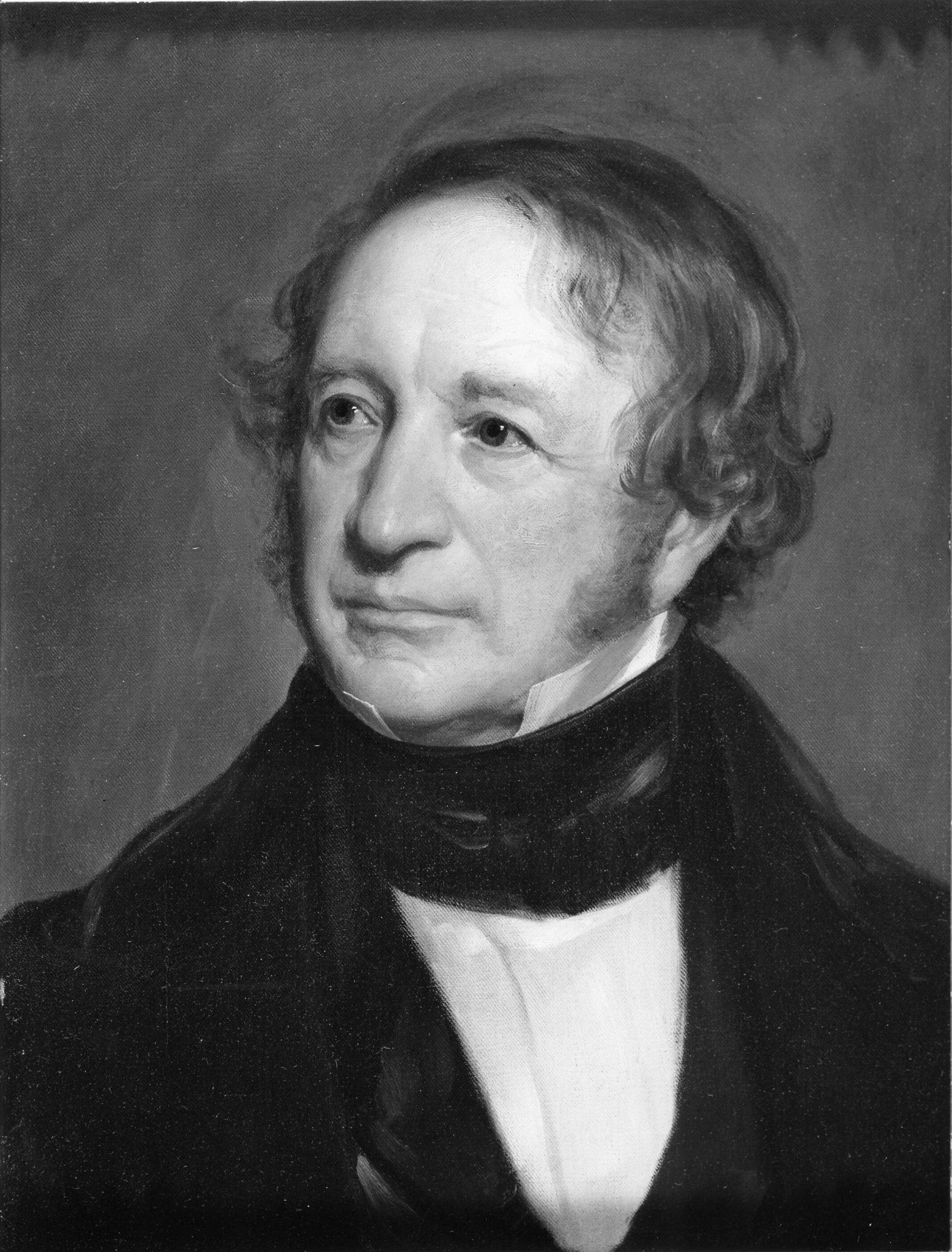
- Painting by George Peter Alexander Healy c. 19th century

Member of the U.S. House of Representatives from Massachusetts's 1st district
- In office March 4, 1831 – March 3, 1833
- Preceded by: Benjamin Gorham
- Succeeded by: Benjamin Gorham
- In office June 9, 1842 – September 28, 1842
- Preceded by: Robert Charles Winthrop
- Succeeded by: Robert Charles Winthrop

Personal details
- Born: October 6, 1779 New Ipswich, New Hampshire
- Died: July 14, 1861 (aged 81) Boston, Massachusetts
- Party: National Republican; Whig
- Spouses: Maria Theresa Gold (m. 1806; died 1833) Harriot Coffin Sumner (m. 1839)
- Relations: Samuel Appleton (brother); William Appleton (cousin); James Appleton (cousin); Robert James Mackintosh (son-in-law); Henry Wadsworth Longfellow (son-in-law); Greely S. Curtis (son-in-law)
- Children: 8, including Thomas
- Parent(s): Isaac Appleton and Mary Adams
- Relatives: Appleton family

Nathan Appleton (October 6, 1779 – July 14, 1861) was an American merchant and politician and a member of the group of entrepreneurs known as "The Boston Associates".

== Early life ==
Appleton was born in New Ipswich, New Hampshire, the son of Isaac Appleton (1731–1806) and his wife Mary Adams (1741–1827). Appleton's father was a church deacon, and Nathan was brought up in the "strictest form of Calvinistic Congregationalism". Appleton was also the cousin of William Appleton (1786–1862) and James Appleton (1785–1862).

His paternal grandparents were Elizabeth Sawyer (1709–1785) and Isaac Appleton Jr. (1704–1794), the son of Isaac Appleton (1664–1747), who was the son of Major Samuel Appleton (1625–1696), and Priscilla Baker, granddaughter of Lt. Gov. Samuel Symonds.

He was educated in the New Ipswich Academy. He then entered Dartmouth College in 1794, however, that same year he left college to begin mercantile life in Boston, Massachusetts, working for his brother Samuel (1766–1853), a successful and benevolent man of business, with whom he was in partnership from 1800 to 1809.

== Career ==
In 1813, Appleton co-operated with Francis Cabot Lowell, Patrick T. Jackson, Paul Moody and others in introducing the power loom and the manufacture of cotton on a large scale into the United States, establishing a factory at Waltham, Massachusetts, in 1814. The Waltham mill employed the first power loom ever used in the United States. This proving successful, he and others purchased the water-power at Pawtucket Falls, and he was one of the founders of the Merrimac Manufacturing Company. The settlement that grew around these factories developed into the city of Lowell, of which in 1821 Appleton was one of the three founders. In a pamphlet entitled The Origin of Lowell, Appleton wrote of the mills: "The contrast in the character of our manufacturing population with that of Europe has been the admiration of most intelligent strangers. The effect has been to more than double the wages of that description of labor from what they were before the introduction of this manufacture". In 1818, Appleton purchased 300 shares of the Suffolk Bank, a clearinghouse bank on State Street in Boston.

=== Political career ===
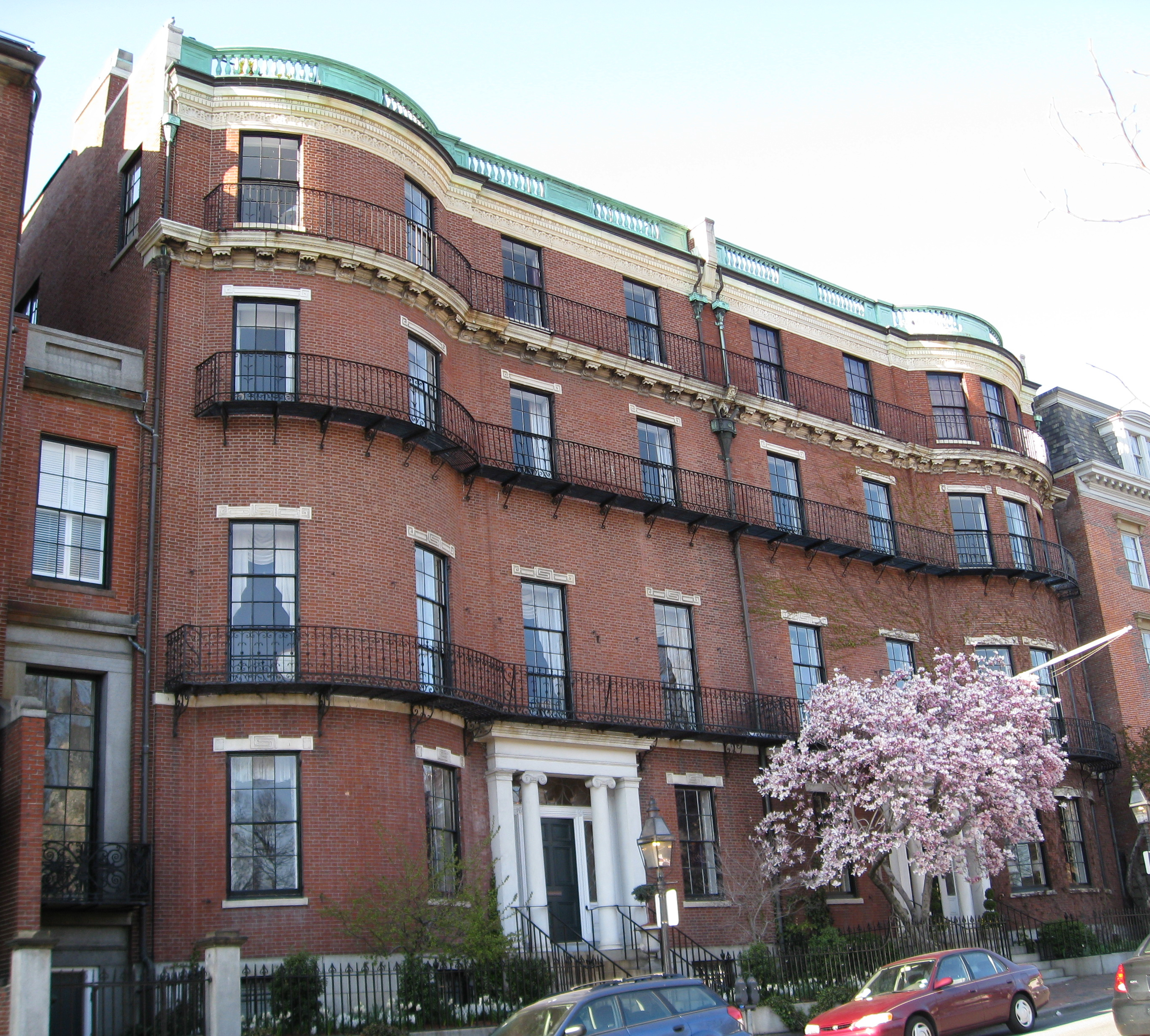
Appleton House, Beacon Street, Boston

Appleton was a member of the general court of Massachusetts in 1816, 1821, 1822, 1824 and 1827. In 1831-1833 and also 1842 he served in the United States House of Representatives, in which he was prominent as an advocate of protective duties. He was also a member of the Academy of Science and Arts, and of the Massachusetts Historical Society. He published speeches and essays on currency, banking, and the tariff, of which his Remarks on Currency and Banking (enlarged ed., 1858) is the most celebrated, as well as his memoirs on the power loom and Lowell. He was elected a Fellow of the American Academy of Arts and Sciences in 1842, and elected a member of the American Antiquarian Society in 1854.

== Personal life ==
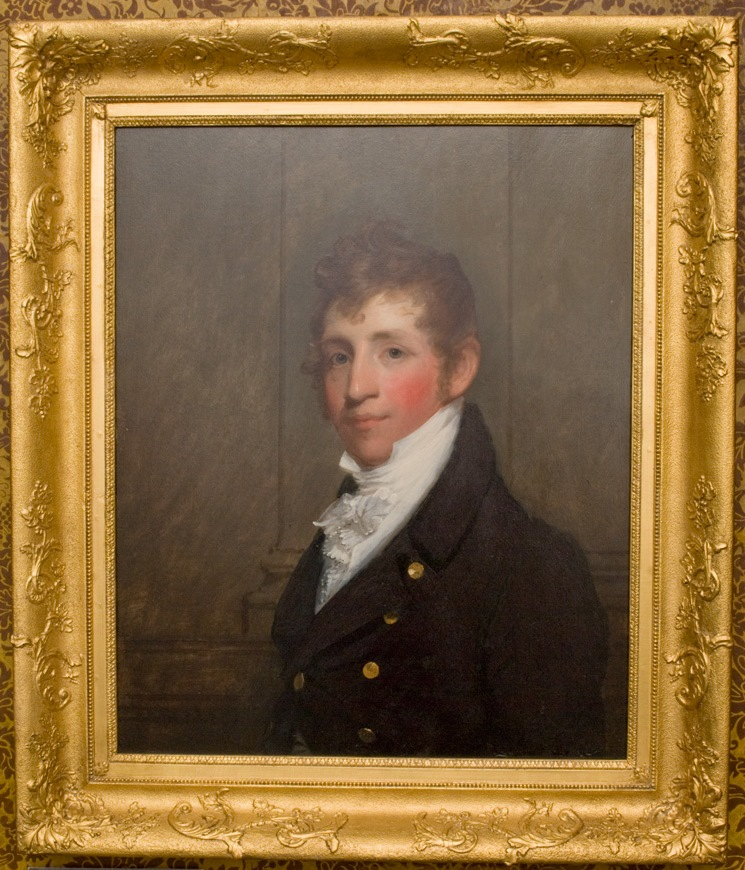
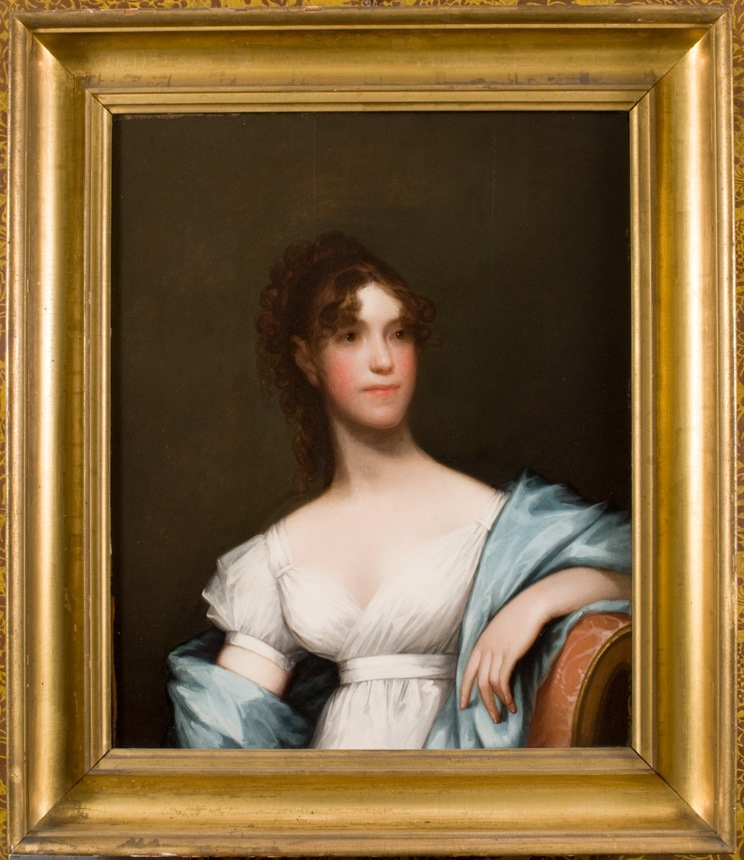
Portraits by Gilbert Stuart of Nathan Appleton and Maria Gold

Appleton married Maria Theresa Gold (1786–1833) on April 13, 1806. Two months later, he hired the artist Gilbert Stuart to paint portraits of the newlyweds. The couple had five children:

- Thomas Gold Appleton (1812–1884)
- Mary "Molly" Appleton (1813-?), who married British colonial governor Robert James Mackintosh
- Charles Sedgwick Appleton (1815–1835)
- Frances "Fanny" Elizabeth Appleton (1819–1861), who married the poet Henry Wadsworth Longfellow in 1843.
- George William Appleton (1826–1827), who died in infancy.

The Appletons attended Federal Street Church. Maria Theresa Appleton died of tuberculosis in 1833. Nathan Appleton remarried on January 8, 1839, to Harriot Coffin Sumner (1802–1867), the daughter of Jesse Sumner, a Boston merchant, and Harriot Coffin of Portland, Maine. They had three children:

- William Sumner Appleton (1840–1903), the father of William Sumner Appleton Jr. (1874–1947).
- Harriet Sumner Appleton (1841–1923), who married Union Army officer Greely S. Curtis
- Nathan Appleton Jr. (1843–1906)

He gave his daughter Fanny, who married Henry Wadsworth Longfellow in 1843, a house in which her husband had rented rooms as a wedding gift (it is now known as the Longfellow House–Washington's Headquarters National Historic Site). He paid $10,000 for the home. Frances wrote to her brother Thomas on August 30, 1843: "We have decided to let Father purchase this grand old mansion", which was also a former headquarters of George Washington during the American Revolutionary War. Nathan Appleton also purchased the land across the street, as Longfellow's mother wrote, "so that their view of the River Charles may not be intercepted".

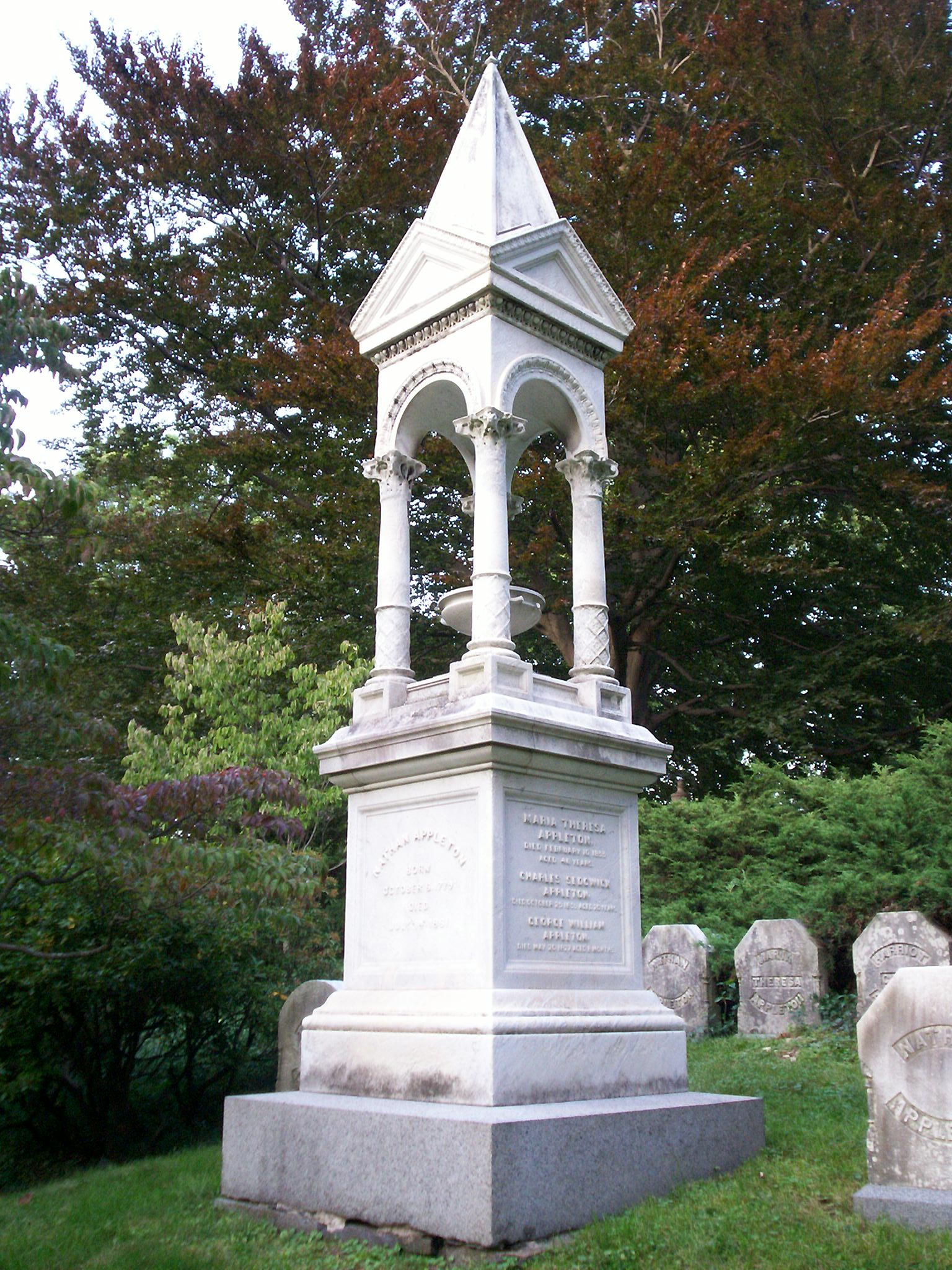
Grave of Nathan Appleton and other members of the Appleton family at Mount Auburn Cemetery

Fanny Appleton died on July 10, 1861, after accidentally catching fire; her father was too sick to attend her funeral. Appleton died the next day in Boston on July 14, 1861.

He is buried in the Mount Auburn Cemetery.

== See also ==
- Nathan Appleton Residence, Beacon Street, Boston

U.S. House of Representatives
Preceded by Benjamin Gorham	Member of the U.S. House of Representatives from Massachusetts's 1st congressional district March 4, 1831 – March 3, 1833	Succeeded by Benjamin Gorham
Preceded by Robert C. Winthrop	Member of the U.S. House of Representatives from Massachusetts's 1st congressional district June 9, 1842 – September 28, 1842	Succeeded by Robert C. Winthrop
