= Peleg Coffin Jr. =

American financier and politician (1756–1805)

Member of the U.S. House of Representatives from Massachusetts's 3rd district
- In office March 4, 1793 – March 3, 1795 Serving with Shearjashub Bourne (General ticket)
- Preceded by: Elbridge Gerry
- Succeeded by: Samuel Lyman

Treasurer and Receiver-General of Massachusetts
- In office 1797–1801
- Governor: Increase Sumner; Moses Gill; Governor's Council; Caleb Strong
- Preceded by: Thomas Davis
- Succeeded by: Jonathan Jackson

Member of the Massachusetts Senate Nantucket District
- In office 1795-1796

Member of the Massachusetts Senate Nantucket District
- In office 1790–1792
- Preceded by: Isaac Coffin

Member of the Massachusetts Senate Nantucket District
- In office 1785–1786

Member of the Massachusetts House of Representatives Nantucket District
- In office 1783 – 1784

Member of the Massachusetts House of Representatives
- In office 1789

Personal details
- Born: November 3, 1756 Nantucket, Province of Massachusetts Bay, British America
- Died: March 6, 1805 (aged 48) Boston, Massachusetts, U.S.
- Resting place: Mount Auburn Cemetery

Peleg Coffin Jr. (November 3, 1756 – March 6, 1805) was an American financier, insurer, and politician from Nantucket and Boston, Massachusetts.

== Early life ==
Coffin was born in Nantucket in the Province of Massachusetts Bay to a whaling family; his parents were Peleg and Elizabeth (Hussey) Coffin. Coffin's father was lost at sea a month after he was born. This early background led him to found and head the New England Marine Insurance Company.

== Public service ==
Coffin served in the Massachusetts House of Representatives in 1783–1784, and in 1789, and in the Massachusetts Senate from 1785 to 1787, 1789 to 1792, and 1795 to 1796. He was elected to represent Massachusetts in the United States House of Representatives in the 3rd United States Congress from March 4, 1793, to March 3, 1795, representing the 3rd district; he previously was an unsuccessful candidate for the 6th district in 1791. Coffin was the Treasurer and Receiver-General of Massachusetts from 1797 to 1801.

U.S. House of Representatives
Preceded by Elbridge Gerry	Member of the U.S. House of Representatives from Massachusetts's 3rd congressional district (alongside Shearjashub Bourne on a General ticket); March 4, 1793–March 3, 1795	Succeeded by Samuel Lyman
Political offices
Preceded by Thomas Davis	Treasurer and Receiver-General of Massachusetts; 1797–1801	Succeeded by Jonathan Jackson
