= Jonathan Jackson (Massachusetts politician) =

American politician (1743–1810)

- Portrait by John Singleton Copley, c. 1767–1769

3rd Treasurer and Receiver-General of Massachusetts
- In office 1802–1806
- Governor: Caleb Strong
- Preceded by: Peleg Coffin
- Succeeded by: Thomson J. Skinner

United States Marshal for the District of Massachusetts
- In office 1789–1791
- Preceded by: Position created
- Succeeded by: John Brooks

Delegate to the Continental Congress from Massachusetts
- In office May 2, 1782 – November 5, 1782
- Preceded by: Artemas Ward
- Succeeded by: Stephen Higginson

Personal details
- Born: June 4, 1743 Boston, Province of Massachusetts Bay
- Died: March 5, 1810 (aged 66) Boston, Massachusetts
- Resting place: Granary Burying Ground, Boston, Massachusetts
- Party: Federalist
- Spouse(s): Sarah Barnard (m. 1767-1770, her death); Hannah Tracy (m. 1772-1797, her death)
- Children: 10 (including Patrick Tracy Jackson, Charles Jackson, and James Jackson)
- Education: Harvard College
- Occupation: Businessman

Jonathan Jackson (June 4, 1743 – March 5, 1810) was an American businessman and politician from Newburyport, Massachusetts. He was most notable for his service as a delegate from Massachusetts in the Continental Congress in 1782, the first United States Marshal for the District of Massachusetts from 1789 to 1791, and Treasurer and Receiver-General of Massachusetts from 1802 to 1806.

A native of Boston, Jackson graduated from Harvard College in 1761 and then moved to Newburyport, where he pursued a successful career as an import-export merchant in addition to other business ventures. A Patriot during the American Revolution, Jackson employed his cargo ships as privateers to harass British shipping, executed contracts to provide supplies to the Continental Army, and loaned the Patriot government money. After the Revolution he opposed Shays' Rebellion, became affiliated with the Federalist Party and served in appointed offices including U.S. Marshal and U.S. Supervisor of Internal Revenue for Massachusetts.

In addition to serving terms in the Massachusetts House of Representatives and Massachusetts Senate, Jackson served as the state's Treasurer and Receiver-General. He died in Boston and was buried at Granary Burying Ground in Boston.

== Early life ==
Jonathan Jackson was born in Boston on June 4, 1743, the son of Edward Jackson (1708–1757) and Dorothy Quincy Jackson. He graduated from Harvard College in 1761 and then moved to Newburyport to start a mercantile career by joining the business of merchant Patrick Tracy.

== Start of career ==
In 1766, Jackson became the partner of John Bromfield in a firm that exported Massachusetts goods including rum and flaxseed and imported iron and flour from Pennsylvania, as well as goods from England, Scotland, and the Caribbean islands. In 1774, he went into partnership with John and Nathaniel Tracy, the sons of Patrick Tracy and brothers of Jackson's second wife.

As the start of the American Revolution loomed, Jackson & Tracy & Tracy benefited when the British government's imposition of the Intolerable Acts and closure of Boston Harbor caused New England merchants to use alternative ports. Jackson's business also involved considerable risk; his partners and he sometimes traded in banned products including guns and gunpowder, and one of their ships was seized off the coast of Portugal by the British Navy.

== Revolutionary years ==
Despite his dependence on foreign trade, Jackson became a supporter of the American Revolution. He served in the Massachusetts Provincial Congress in 1775. In 1776, he joined the Massachusetts Committee of Correspondence and was appointed chairman of the state Committee of Safety.

Prior to the conflict, Jackson owned a slave named Pompey or "Pomp". In June 1776, he freed Pomp and in the manumission document cited his belief that slavery was improper, particularly as the Patriots were arguing for individual liberties that every man ought to possess. Pomp took the surname Jackson, and served as a fifer in the Continental Army until the end of the war.

Jackson was a member of the Massachusetts House of Representatives in 1777. In 1778, the Massachusetts government submitted the draft of a new state constitution to the towns for their consideration. Jackson joined several Essex County lawyers and businessmen including Theophilus Parsons in authoring a response called the "Essex Result". He was a delegate to the Massachusetts Constitutional Convention of 1779–1780, where he successfully advocated for adoption of the Constitution of Massachusetts. In May 1782, Governor John Hancock appointed Jackson to a vacant seat in the Continental Congress, and he served until the following November.

Jackson also turned his merchant ships into privateers that preyed on British ships. In addition, he was a principal contractor supplying the Continental Army. During the war, he was investigated for overcharging for goods he provided to the army, and accusations that he had marked-up some supplies by as much as two thousand percent, which he denied, proved to be a source of irritation for him. In fact, Jackson's contributions to the Patriot cause, including loans which were repaid slowly or not at all, had nearly bankrupted him.

== Post-Revolution ==
Despite his reduced financial circumstances, Jackson opposed Shays' Rebellion, the 1786 revolt of Massachusetts debtors that was led by Daniel Shays. In conjunction with Samuel Adams and Stephen Higginson, Jackson authored a public condemnation of the rebellion and he also organized a counter-demonstration in Boston. In addition, he served as a cavalry officer in the Essex County militia regiment that was activated to help quell the rebellion, and was an aide to General Benjamin Lincoln, the overall commander of the militia response.

The combination of Shay' Rebellion and a depressed economy led Jackson to publish a 1788 pamphlet laying out his Federalist political views, Thoughts on the Political Situation of the United States. In Jackson's view, the new President of the United States and United States Congress should have longer terms and Congress should be smaller. He approved of the new United States Constitution, but questioned whether it was strong enough to insulate political leaders from the temporary ebbs and flows of popular opinion. He also believed the Constitution's checks and balances were insufficient for preventing demagoguery, which the events of the 1780s convinced him was a major concern.

== Federal appointee ==
In 1788, Jackson was a candidate for the United States House of Representatives, but lost to Benjamin Goodhue. After George Washington became president, Jackson visited him at the temporary capital in New York City, intending to request appointment as Collector of Customs for the Port of Boston. When Jackson learned that Benjamin Lincoln was in the city to request the same appointment, he used his interview with Washington to make the case for appointing Lincoln. Lincoln received the appointment, but Washington was impressed enough with Jackson's willingness to defer to Lincoln that he appointed Jackson as the first United States Marshal for the District of Massachusetts. As marshal, Jackson was responsible for enforcing federal laws and overseeing prisoners convicted of federal crimes. He also supervised the first United States census in Massachusetts. In 1789, Jackson won a term in the Massachusetts Senate, which he served while continuing to hold his federal post. When Washington visited Massachusetts in October 1789, Jackson hosted him for tea during his stop in Newburyport.

In 1791, Jackson was appointed Inspector of Internal Revenue for the Second District of Massachusetts, with responsibility for enforcing federal tax laws in the same area where Shays’ Rebellion had earlier taken place. In 1796, Jackson was appointed Supervisor of Internal Revenue for Massachusetts, succeeding Nathaniel Gorham. This position was based in Boston, resulting in Jackson leaving Newburyport to take up residence near where he worked. In 1795, Washington offered Jackson the position of U.S. Comptroller of the Currency, but Jackson declined because he preferred to continue residing in Massachusetts. Jackson continued to serve in the supervisor's position until July 1802, when the first Democratic-Republican president, Thomas Jefferson, succeeded at abolishing federal taxes.

== Later career ==
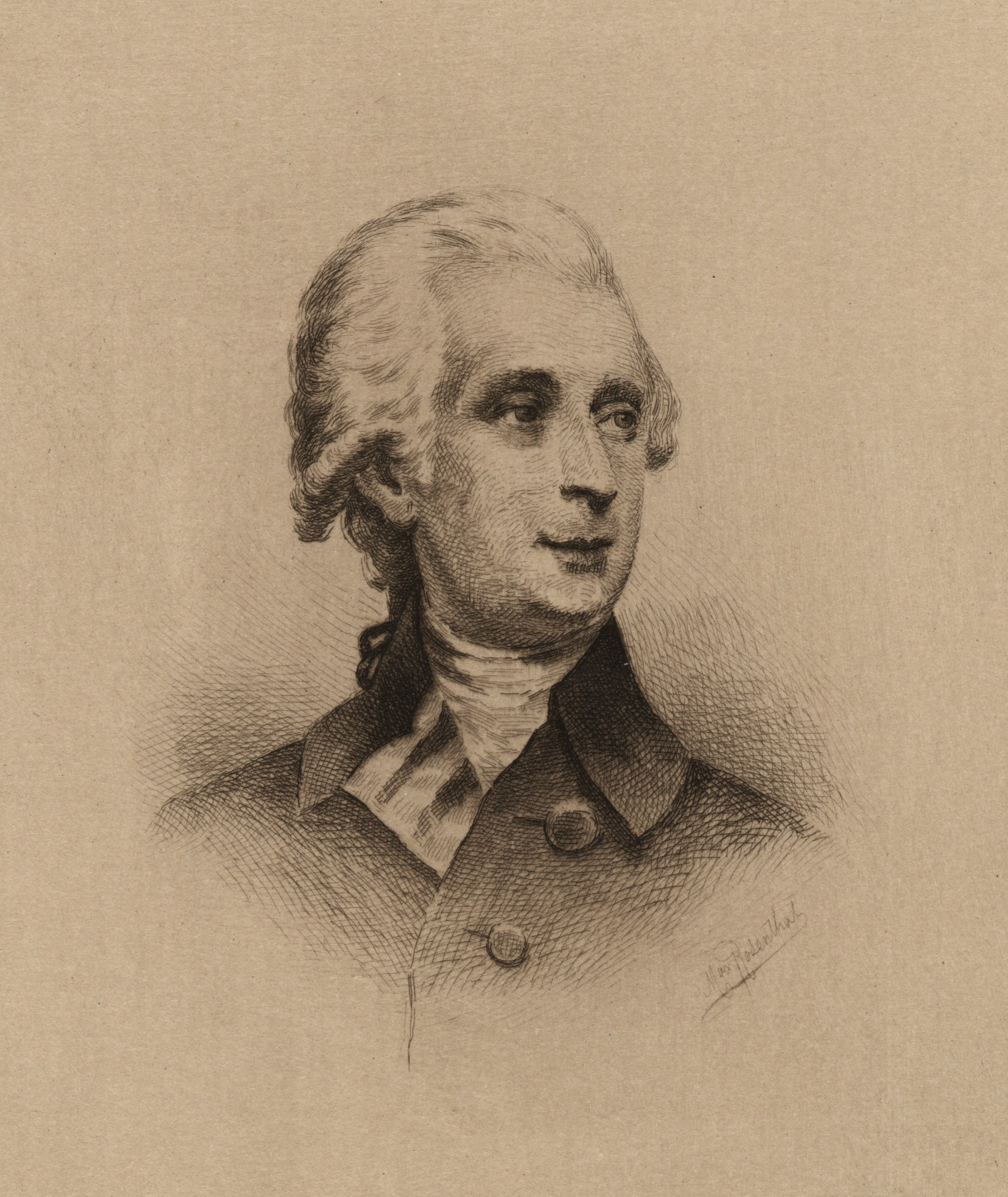
Posthumous etching, c. 1885

Jackson was elected Treasurer and Receiver-General of Massachusetts in 1802, and he served until 1806. He also served as president of the Boston Bank, and in 1807 was appointed treasurer of Harvard College. Among Jackson's other ventures was an entity, "Proprietors of Locks and Canals on the Merrimack River", formed to advocate the use of water power to promote business growth in New England.

In retirement, Jackson resided in Boston. He died in Boston on March 5, 1810. Jackson was buried at Granary Burying Ground. At his death, Jackson's success at restoring his finances was proved by the value of his estate, approximately $26,000, worth about $465,000 in 2022.

== Family ==
Coat of Arms of Jonathan Jackson

In January 1767, Jackson married Sarah Barnard, the daughter of a Salem minister. She died from tuberculosis in 1770. Jackson also became ill at around the same time, which required an extensive recuperation period.

Jackson married Hannah Tracy, his first partner's daughter, in 1772. They were the parents of 10 children: Edward, Robert, Henry, Charles, Hannah, James, Sarah, Patrick, Harriet, and Mary.

Their daughter Hannah married Francis Cabot Lowell, who went into business with their son, Patrick Tracy Jackson. Their son Charles Jackson served on the Massachusetts Supreme Court. Their son James Jackson became a physician and co-founded Massachusetts General Hospital.

Jackson's descendants include great-grandson Oliver Wendell Holmes Jr., who served on the U.S. Supreme Court, and fifth great-grandson Patrick G. Jackson, a surgeon who is married to Supreme Court Justice Ketanji Brown Jackson.

== Bibliography ==
- Connolly, Michael J. (Winter 2013). "Jonathan Jackson's Thoughts: A High Federalist Critique of the Philadelphia Constitution" (PDF). Historical Journal of Massachusetts. Westfield, MA: Westfield State University.
- Gates, Merrill E., ed. (1905). Men of Mark in America. Vol. 1. Washington, DC: Men of Mark Publishing Company – via Google Books.
- George H. Moses, Chairman, U.S. Congress Joint Committee on Printing (1928). Biographical Directory of the American Congress, 1774-1927. Washington, DC: U.S. Government Printing Office – via Google Books.
- Putnam, Elizabeth Cabot; Putnam, James Jackson, eds. (1907). The Hon. Jonathan Jackson and Hannah (Tracy) Jackson, Their Ancestors and Descendants. Boston, MA: T. R. Marvin and Son. ISBN 9780598994707 – via Google Books.

Political offices
Preceded by Peleg Coffin	Treasurer and Receiver-General of Massachusetts; 1806–1808	Succeeded by Thomson J. Skinner
