= Charles Jackson (judge) =

American judge (1775–1855)

Associate Justice of the Massachusetts Supreme Judicial Court
- In office 1813–1823
- Preceded by: Theodore Sedgwick
- Succeeded by: Vacant

Personal details
- Born: 31 May 1775 Newburyport, Massachusetts, U.S.
- Died: 13 December 1855 (aged 80)
- Relatives: Patrick Tracy Jackson (brother); James Jackson (brother)

Charles Jackson (31 May 1775 – 13 December 1855) was an American jurist based in Massachusetts.

== Biography ==
Jackson was born in Newburyport, Massachusetts. He was the son of Newburyport merchant and Continental Congress Massachusetts delegate Jonathan Jackson and Hannah Tracy.

Jackson graduated from Harvard University in 1793, studied law with Chief Justice Parsons, and began to practice in 1796 at Newburyport. In 1803, he relocated to Boston, where, associated with Judge Hubbard, he had a most lucrative practice, probably more lucrative than any other in New England had been up until that time.

Jackson was judge of the Massachusetts Supreme Court (1813–1824), a member of the State Constitutional Convention of 1820, and one of the commissioners to revise the Massachusetts State Laws in 1833, drawing up the second part of the “Revised Statutes.” He also wrote Treatise on the Pleadings and Practice in Real Actions in 1828. Jackson was elected a Fellow of the American Academy of Arts and Sciences in 1817.

== Family ==
Jackson was the brother of Lowell, Massachusetts, industrialist Patrick Tracy Jackson and Massachusetts General Hospital proponent James Jackson. His daughter, Amelia Lee Jackson, married physician Oliver Wendell Holmes Sr., later becoming mother of Associate Justice of the Supreme Court of the United States Oliver Wendell Holmes Jr.

== Sources ==
- Holmes, Oliver Wendell (1879). "Jackson, Charles" . In Ripley, George; Dana, Charles A. (eds.). The American Cyclopædia.

Legal offices
Preceded by Theodore Sedgwick	Associate Justice of the Massachusetts Supreme Judicial Court; 1813–1823	Vacant Title next held by Charles Dewey
