= Benjamin Gorham =

American politician (1775–1855)

Member of the U.S. House of Representatives from Massachusetts's 1st district
- In office November 6, 1820 – March 3, 1823
- Preceded by: Jonathan Mason
- Succeeded by: Daniel Webster
- In office July 23, 1827 – March 3, 1831
- Preceded by: Daniel Webster
- Succeeded by: Nathan Appleton
- In office March 4, 1833 – March 3, 1835
- Preceded by: Nathan Appleton
- Succeeded by: Abbott Lawrence

Member of the Massachusetts State Senate
- Succeeded by: William Gray

Member of the Massachusetts House of Representatives
- In office 1814-1818

Personal details
- Born: February 13, 1775 Charlestown, Province of Massachusetts Bay, British America
- Died: September 27, 1855 (aged 80) Boston, Massachusetts, U.S.
- Party: Democratic Republican and National Republican

Benjamin Gorham (February 13, 1775 – September 27, 1855) was a U.S. representative from Massachusetts.

He was the son of Nathaniel Gorham, who served as one of the Presidents of the Continental Congress. Benjamin was born in Charlestown in the Province of Massachusetts Bay. He pursued preparatory studies, graduated from Harvard University in 1795, and studied law. When he was admitted to the bar he commenced practice in Boston. From 1814 to 1818 he served as a member of the Massachusetts House of Representatives and then turned to the Massachusetts State Senate, where he served from May 26, 1819 until he resigned on January 10, 1821. He was elected as a Democratic-Republican to the Sixteenth Congress to fill the vacancy caused by the resignation of Jonathan Mason; he was re-elected when the term expired, and served until March 3, 1823.

Afterwards he returned to the State senate for one term beginning May 28, 1823, before being elected as an Adams candidate to the Twentieth Congress to fill the vacancy caused by the resignation of Daniel Webster and then reelected as an Anti-Jacksonian to the Twenty-first Congress and served from July 23, 1827, to March 3, 1831. After a term filled by Nathan Appleton, he was elected as an Anti-Jacksonian to the Twenty-third Congress (March 4, 1833 - March 3, 1835). Afterward he served again a member of the State house of representatives in 1841 and resumed the practice of law.

He died in Boston in 1855, aged 80, and was interred in the Phipps Street Burying Ground in Charlestown.

U.S. House of Representatives
Preceded by Jonathan Mason	Member of the U.S. House of Representatives from Massachusetts's 1st congressional district November 6, 1820 - March 3, 1823	Succeeded by Daniel Webster
Preceded by Daniel Webster	Member of the U.S. House of Representatives from Massachusetts's 1st congressional district July 23, 1827 - March 3, 1831	Succeeded by Nathan Appleton
Preceded by Nathan Appleton	Member of the U.S. House of Representatives from Massachusetts's 1st congressional district March 4, 1833 - March 3, 1835	Succeeded by Abbott Lawrence
