= James Jackson (physician) =

American physician (1777–1867)

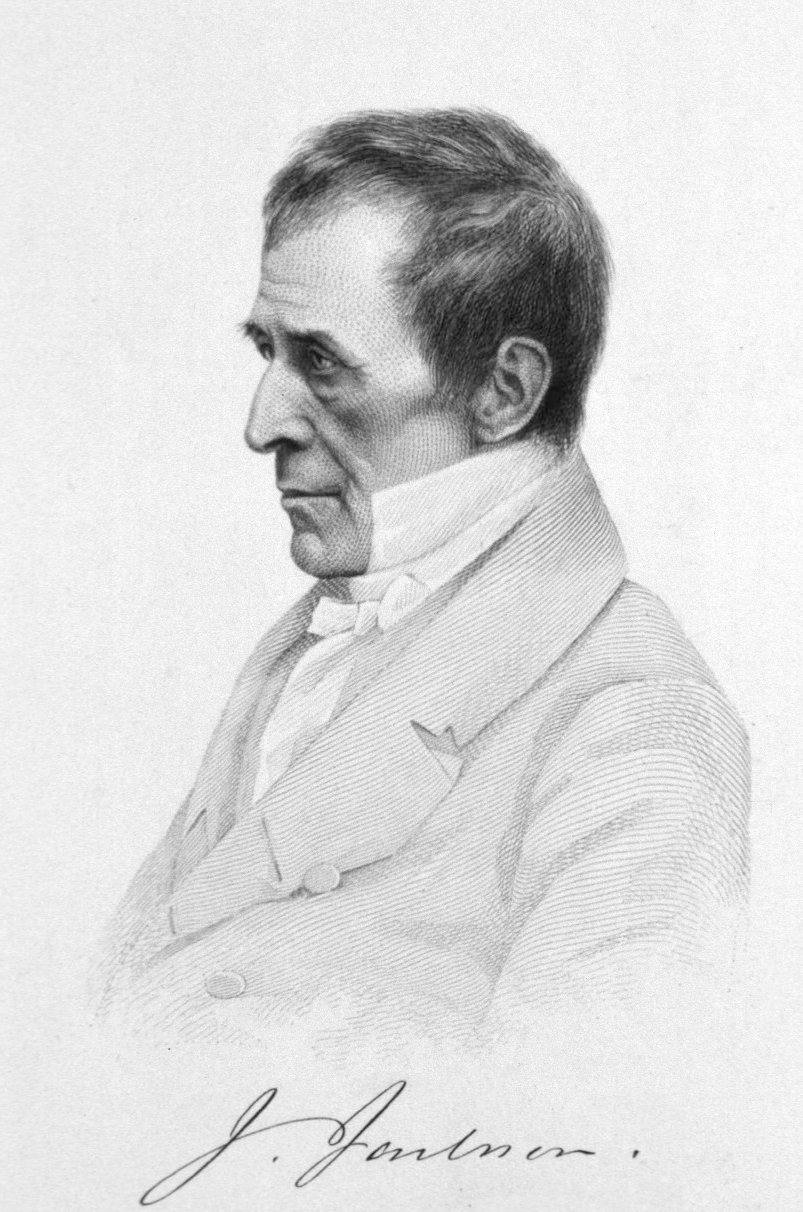
James Jackson

James Jackson (3 October 1777 in Newburyport, Massachusetts – 27 August 1867 in Boston) was an American medical doctor. He was a proponent of Massachusetts General Hospital and became its first physician.

== Life and career ==
Coat of Arms of Jame Jackson

He was the son of Newburyport merchant Jonathan Jackson who had been a representative of Massachusetts in the Continental Congress. He graduated from Harvard in 1796, and, after teaching for a year in Leicester Academy, was employed until December 1797 as a clerk for his father, who was then an officer of the government. After studying medicine in Salem for two years, he sailed for London, where he became a “dresser” in St. Thomas's Hospital, and attended lectures there and at Guy's Hospital.

He returned to Boston in 1800, and began a medical practice, which he continued until 1866. In 1803 he became a member of the Massachusetts Medical Society, and in 1810 he proposed with John Collins Warren the establishment of a hospital and an asylum for the insane. Somerville Asylum was soon founded, and afterward the Massachusetts General Hospital was begun in Boston, of which he was the first physician until he resigned in 1835. In 1810 he was chosen professor of clinical medicine at Harvard Medical School, and in 1812 professor of theory and practice, which post he held until 1835, and was afterward professor emeritus until his death. Jackson was elected a Fellow of the American Academy of Arts and Sciences in 1808.

== Family ==
He was the brother of Lowell, Massachusetts, industrialist Patrick Tracy Jackson, and Massachusetts Supreme Court judge Charles Jackson. Among his students was Oliver Wendell Holmes Sr., who married his brother Charles' daughter Amelia Lee Jackson.

Jackson was married to Elizabeth Cabot from 1801 until her death in 1817. They had nine children, including Lydia Cabot, wife of Charles Storer Storrow. They named one of their sons, James Jackson Storrow, after Jackson. In 1818, Jackson married Sarah Cabot, the sister of his first wife.

Jackson great-grandsons included industrialist James J. Storrow and 1934 Nobel Prize winner George Minot.

== Works ==
- On the Brunomian System (1809)
- "Remarks on the Medical Effects of Dentition" in the New England Medical and Surgical Journal (1812)
- Eulogy on Dr. John Warren (1815)
- Syllabus of Lectures (1816)
- Text-Book of Lectures (1825–27)
- A memoir of his son, James Jackson Jr., who died in 1834
- Letters to a Young Physician (1855; 4th ed., 1856)

He also published articles in the Transactions of the Massachusetts Medical Society, of which he was elected president several times. Reports drawn up principally or entirely by him include:

- “On Cow Pox and Small Pox”
- “On Spotted Fever”
- “On Spasmodic Cholera”

He also made numerous other contributions to the New England Medical and Surgical Journal and other periodicals.
