= 1822 Boston mayoral election =

Election in Massachusetts, United States

- April 9, 1822 (first vote); April 16, 1822 (second vote)
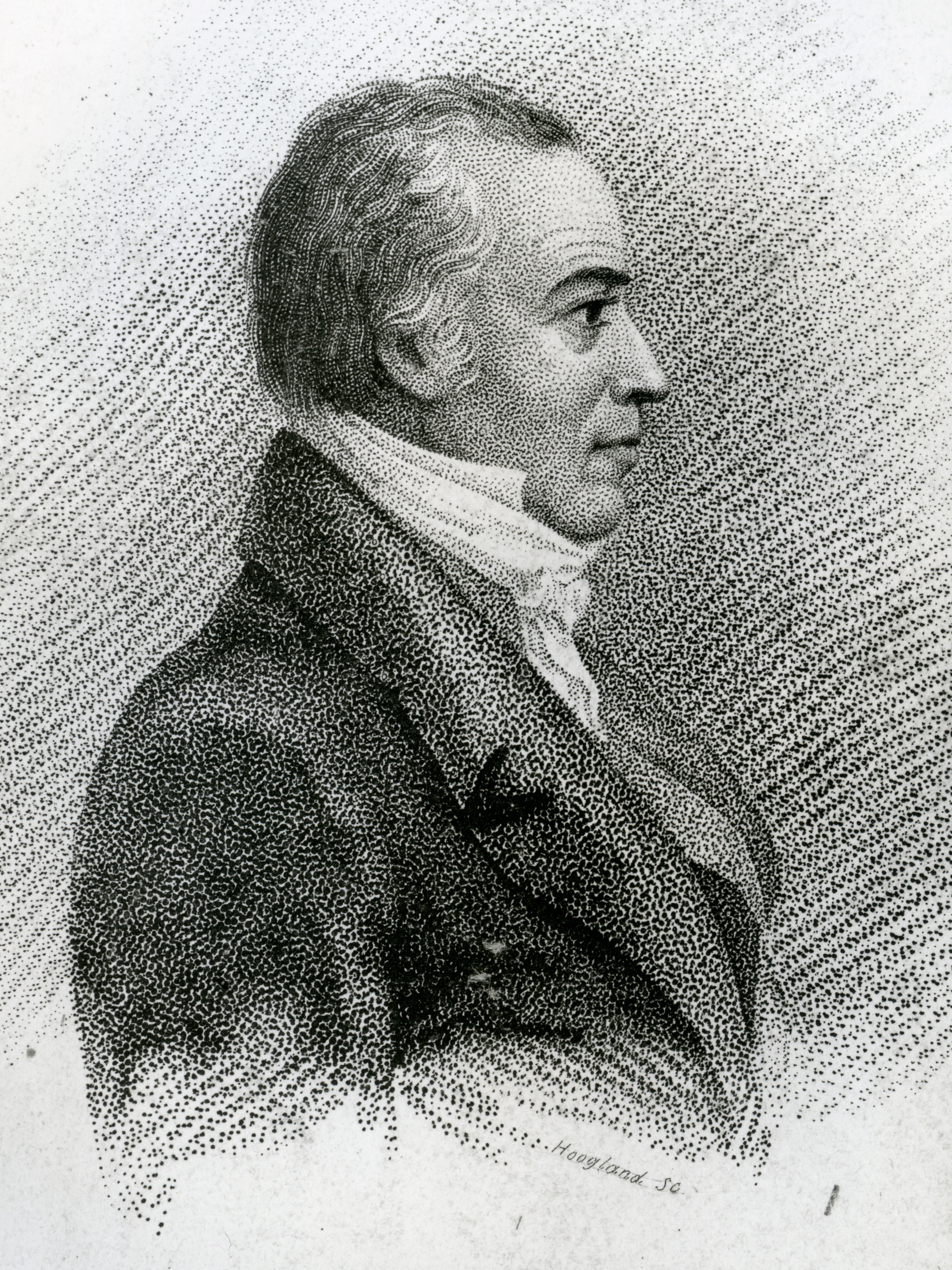

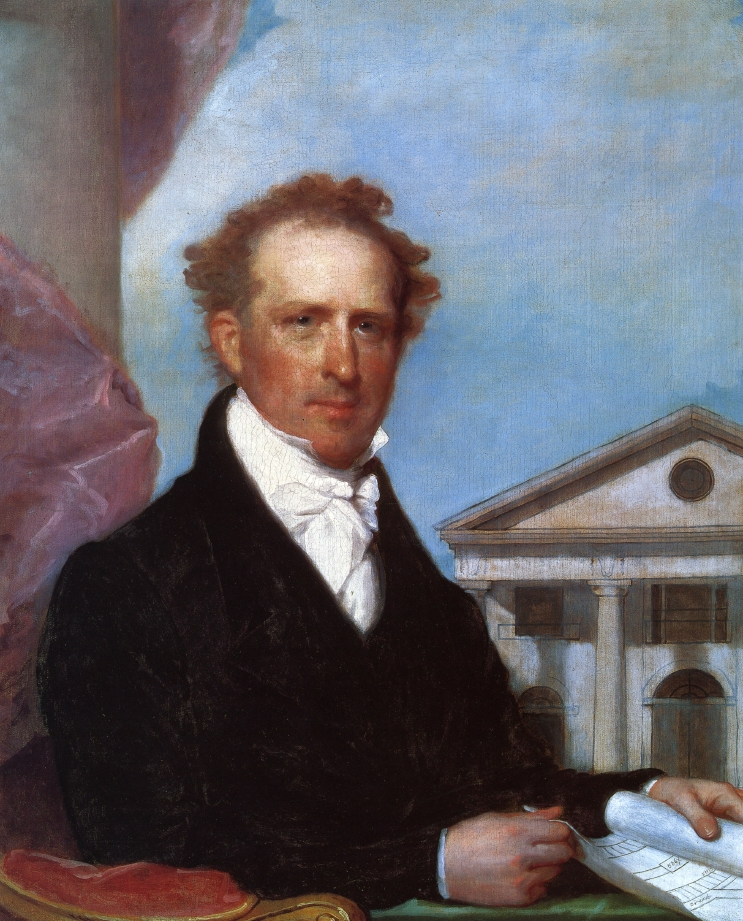

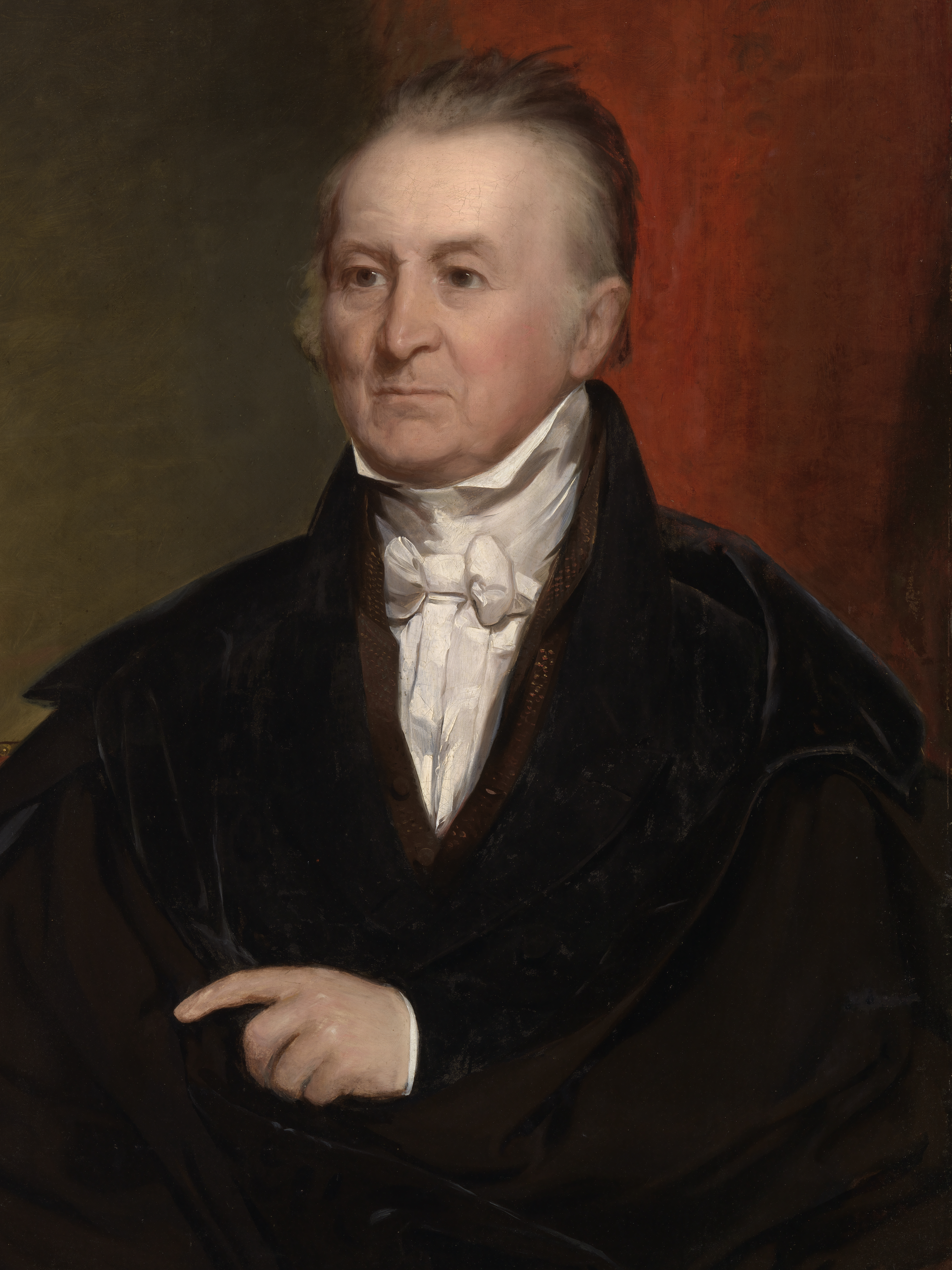
Candidate	John Phillips	Josiah Quincy III	Harrison Gray Otis
First vote	not a candidate for 1st vote	1,736 (46.92%)	1,384 (37.41%)
Second vote	2,456 (92.68%)	not a candidate for 2nd vote	not a candidate for 2nd vote
Mayor before election
office established
Elected mayor
John Phillips

The 1822 Boston mayoral election saw the election of John Phillips as the inaugural mayor of Boston. The first vote, held on April 9, 1822, did not result in any candidate receiving the required majority of the vote, resulting in a second vote held on April 16, 1822, which Phillips won.

On May 1, 1822, Phillips took office when the Boston Board of Selectmen ceremonially handed over control of the city to the new government consisting of the newly established mayoralty, held by Phillips, and the newly established City Council.

== First vote (April 9, 1822) ==
Josiah Quincy III and Harrison Gray Otis were the top-two contenders, while three lesser candidates also received support.

Boston mayoral election first vote (April 9, 1822)
Candidate	Votes	%
Josiah Quincy III	1,736	46.92
Harrison Gray Otis	1,384	37.41
Others	580	15.68
Total votes	3,700	100

== Second vote (April 16, 1822) ==
An agreement was reached that Phillips would be the consensus candidate.

Boston mayoral election second vote (April 16, 1822)
Candidate	Votes	%
John Phillips	2,456	92.68
Others	194	7.32
Total votes	2,650	100

== See also ==
- List of mayors of Boston, Massachusetts
