= Suffolk Bank =

Former private clearinghouse in Boston

Suffolk Bank was a private clearinghouse bank in Boston, Massachusetts, that exchanged specie or locally backed bank notes for notes from country banks to which city-dwellers could not easily travel to redeem notes.

The bank was issued its corporate charter on February 10, 1818 by the 38th Massachusetts General Court to a group of the Boston Associates (including Patrick Tracy Jackson and Daniel Pinckney Parker), and the charter's holders and bank's directors met periodically from February 27 to March 19 at the Boston Exchange Coffee House to discuss the organization of the bank. On April 1, the bank opened for business in rented offices on State Street until the bank moved permanently to the corner of State and Kilby Streets on April 17. In addition to Jackson and Parker, other prominent shareholders of the bank included William Appleton, Nathan Appleton, Timothy Bigelow, John Brooks, Gardiner Greene, Henry Hubbard, Augustine Heard, Amos Lawrence, Abbott Lawrence, Luther Lawrence, William Prescott, Dudley Leavitt Pickman, and Benjamin Seaver.

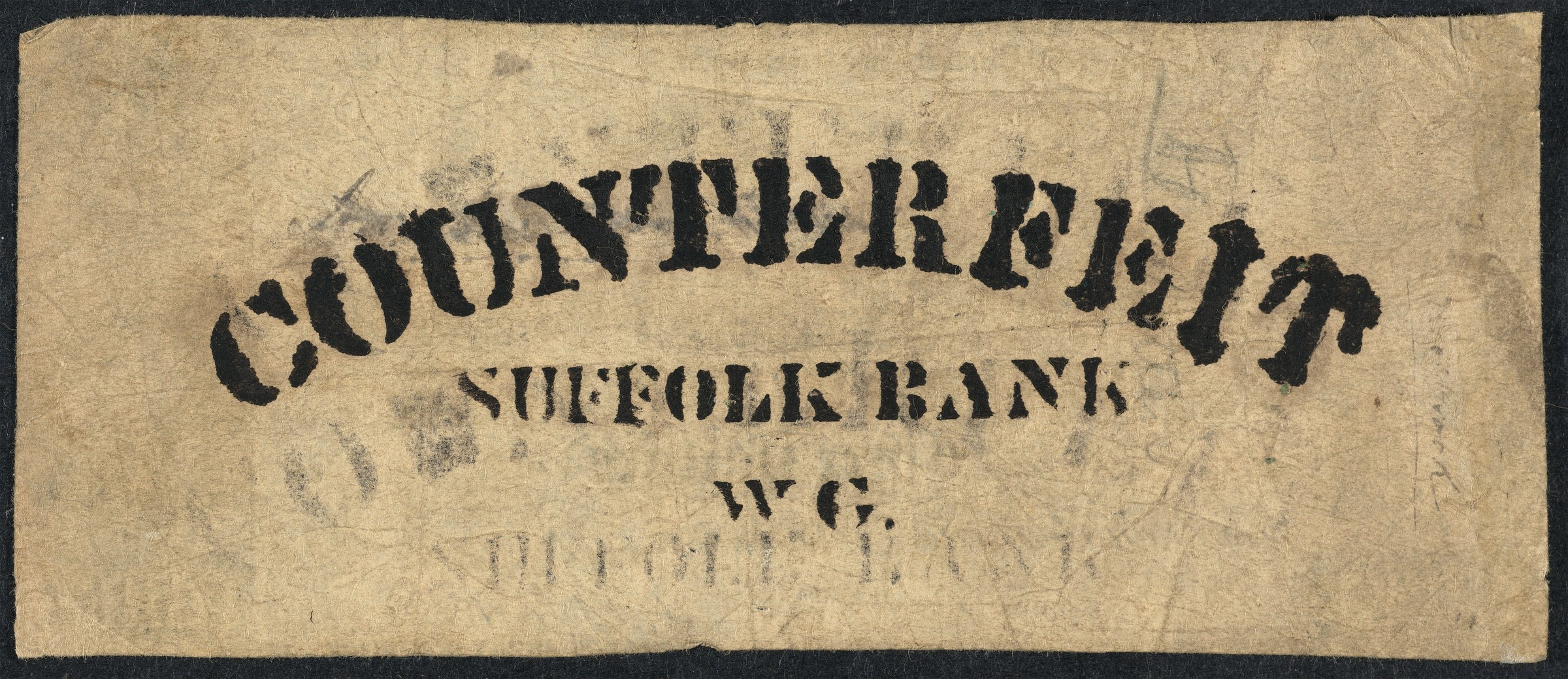
White River, Vermont 3 dollar bank note marked counterfeit by the Suffolk bank.

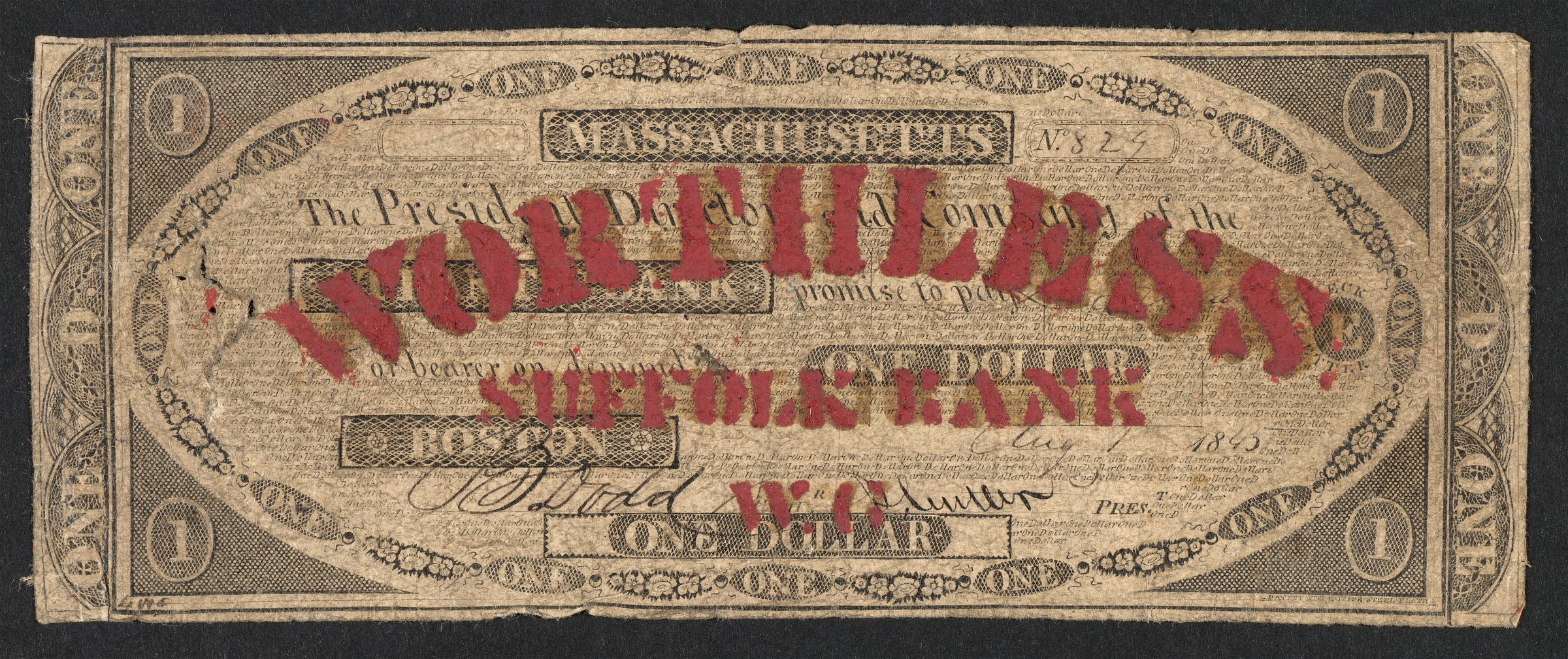
Massachusetts 1 dollar bill from 1845 marked "Worthless" by the Suffolk Bank.

== Background ==
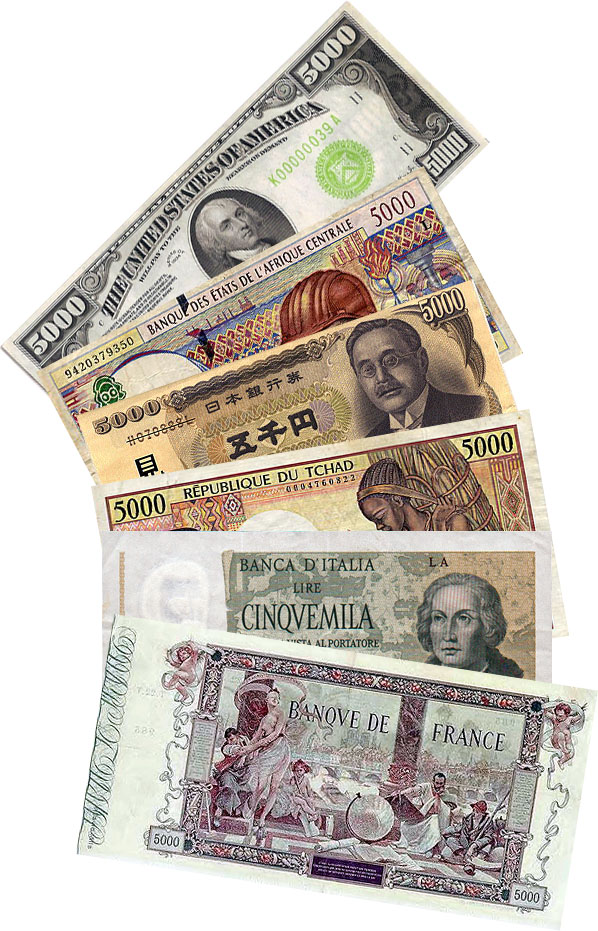
Banknotes with a face value of 5000 of different currencies.

During pre-Civil War times in the United States, banks around the country issued bank notes as a form of currency. The large number of banks led to a large number of diverse bank notes that circulated around the country. Although many banks issued only enough bank notes that could be backed up by specie (gold and silver during the time), riskier banks gave into temptation and issued more than they could cover. This practice caused many people to doubt the exact worth of certain notes and in turn have little faith in some banks. In 1819, the Suffolk Bank of Boston was founded and only five years later it had developed the Suffolk System and recruited six other Boston banks to join. The system was set up to ensure that banks could always back up their bank notes issued. This was accomplished by forcing all of the banks within the system to hold higher reserves of specie and keep deposits in the Suffolk Bank, resulting in the first ever clearing house agreement for currencies in country banks.

Only a year later in 1825, all bank notes that passed through the Suffolk System were taken at par. In just a single year the Suffolk System had given these seven Boston banks a uniform currency. As the Suffolk Bank grew in size it became able to assert pressure on other country banks and by 1838, over 300 banks (basically all of New England's banks) redeemed their notes through the Suffolk System. All of New England now had a uniform currency. Throughout the system's existence, The Suffolk Bank was sure to keep all of the country banks within the system honest by presenting banks with their notes and requesting specie. The discipline enacted by the Suffolk Bank made virtually all bank notes in New England equal to their face value, allowing them to be traded within banks. The uniform currency was the first of its kind in the United States and remained in use all the way until 1858.

== Suffolk System ==
The Suffolk System was the first regulatory banking system arrangement of remote banks created in the United States. Starting in 1824, the Suffolk Bank, along with six other banks, created a system that required country (non-federal) banks to deposit reserve balances in one or more of the participating banks, which guaranteed that each country bank could redeem their banknotes in specie. The Suffolk Bank became one of the most profitable in the country and continued to operate under the Suffolk System until 1858, when rival institutions complained of dictatorial practices and eventually national legislation banned state banknotes. The Suffolk System was the predecessor to modern banking practices and led to the creation of the Federal Reserve that still operates today.

=== The Suffolk System in practice ===
The bank operated by redeeming country banks' notes at par value, so long as the banks maintained an account with Suffolk Bank. To qualify for such an account, a bank was required to remit a starting deposit of $2,000 or more, and—in the case of banks not located in Boston—to maintain a sufficient balance to redeem any of the banks' notes that Suffolk Bank might receive for redemption. Beginning in 1824, "all of the banks in Boston, with the exception of the New England [a competing clearinghouse bank], agreed to make the Suffolk Bank their agent for the redemption of bills of outside banks." The Suffolk Bank enabled member banks to deposit notes from other banks at par value, and to be credited for these deposits within one business day. The bank operated in this manner until the Bank of Mutual Redemption was organized in 1858 and assumed this role for all of New England.

Throughout the existence of the Suffolk System many important banking practices were discovered and put into practice. After the system became in place, the role of counterfeiting in the New England area fell dramatically. Before the appearance of a uniform currency, many rural banks issued their own bank notes creating a large amount of different notes. This not only caused confusion, but also led many criminals to counterfeit bank notes creating an ever-present risk of accepting bank notes that may not be worth what they claimed. The presence of bank panics during the existence of the Suffolk System also led to new banking practices that would continue in practice until present day. The Panic of 1837, a deflationary backlash inducing depression and unemployment, was caused by many different factors including the practices of the Second Bank of the United States and political failures. Although the country entered a recession, the activities of the Suffolk Bank led the New England area to fare much better than the rest of the country. These practices included, lending reserves to other banks and keeping the payment system operating. Today central banks adopt these same practices that started with the private, commercial Suffolk Bank. More banking panics happened during the reign of the Suffolk System (Panic of 1839, Panic of 1857) but their practices continued to minimize the depression in New England.

The Suffolk Bank has been considered by some to be a central bank, however it is highly contested due to its private nature. Some economist have argued that it can not be labeled a central bank because of a lack of control of the money supply, while others claim the system certainly had a degree of control or it would have been altogether ineffective. Although it seems The Suffolk Bank cannot be considered completely private, it has proven that private individuals acting outside of political control are capable of providing the same functions of a central bank at lower costs.

=== End of the Suffolk System ===
Although the Suffolk System was a great regulator of unsound banking practices, it lacked the ability to properly administer the total volume of banknote circulation. The Suffolk System regulated how many bank notes could be issued by country banks, but it was ineffective regulating the bank note circulation of the system. It has been considered a "good regulator of a bad system". In 1858 the Suffolk System ended and was later replaced by the advent of the Bank of Mutual Redemption. The Suffolk System's many good qualities could no longer outweigh the lack of their ability to increase note circulation.

Although the Suffolk System was done away with by national legislation, the system of centralizing reserves among only a small number of banks developed into modem banking practice. The Suffolk System was responsible for creating strong banking techniques and in making smaller banks responsible for all of their banknotes issued. The system created a uniform currency throughout New England and most importantly the system help lead United States banking practices into what they are today.

== 1865 restructuting ==
Following passage of the National Bank Act of 1864, the Suffolk Bank was reorganized and renamed as the Suffolk National Bank on January 1, 1865, and continued to operate as a national bank until it merged in 1902 with the Washington National Bank to form the National Suffolk Bank which was liquidated in 1903.

== Impact ==
Economic historians still disagree on the original purpose of the Suffolk System. Although the system would later lead to stronger banking practices and a uniform currency for the Northeast, not all historians believe this was the System's original intention. Some believe the Suffolk Bank was not attempting to police the currency markets in Boston, but rather to monopolize the brokerage of all the paper notes of the country banks in order to decrease circulation and open the markets for themselves. Although the systems’ initial intentions are unknown, its results are evident.

In his History of Money and Banking in the United States, Murray Rothbard credits the Suffolk Bank with exercising "a stabilizing influence on the New England economy." John Jay Knox Jr., a former Comptroller of the U.S. Treasury, stated that the success of the Suffolk Bank demonstrated that:

the fact is established that private enterprise could be entrusted with the work of redeeming the circulating notes of the banks, and it could thus be done as safely and much more economically than the same service can be performed by the Government.

== See also ==
- History of central banking in the United States#1837–1862: "Free Banking" Era
- Federal Reserve System
- New York Clearing House Association

== Bibliography ==
- Allen, Larry (2009). The Encyclopedia of Money (2nd ed.). Santa Barbara, CA: ABC-CLIO. pp. 382–383. ISBN 978-1598842517.
- Lake, Wilfred S. (November 1947). "The End of the Suffolk System". The Journal of Economic History. 7 (2). Cambridge University Press: 183–207. doi:10.1017/S0022050700054292. JSTOR 2113340. S2CID 153983613.
- Rolnick, Arthur J.; Smith, Bruce D.; Weber, Warren E. (Summer 1998). "Lessons From a Laissez-Faire Payments System: The Suffolk Banking System (1825–1858)" (PDF). Federal Reserve Bank of Minneapolis Quarterly Review. 24 (2). Minneapolis: Federal Reserve Bank of Minneapolis: 11–21.
- Clement, Douglas (September 1, 2010). "The Suffolk System — Federal Reserve Bank of Minneapolis". Federal Reserve Bank of Minneapolis.
- Whitney, D. R. (2017) [1878]. The Suffolk Bank. Forgotten Books. ISBN 978-1333759537.
