= David Sears House =

Historic house in Boston, Massachusetts

- U.S. National Register of Historic Places
- U.S. National Historic Landmark
- U.S. National Historic Landmark District – Contributing property
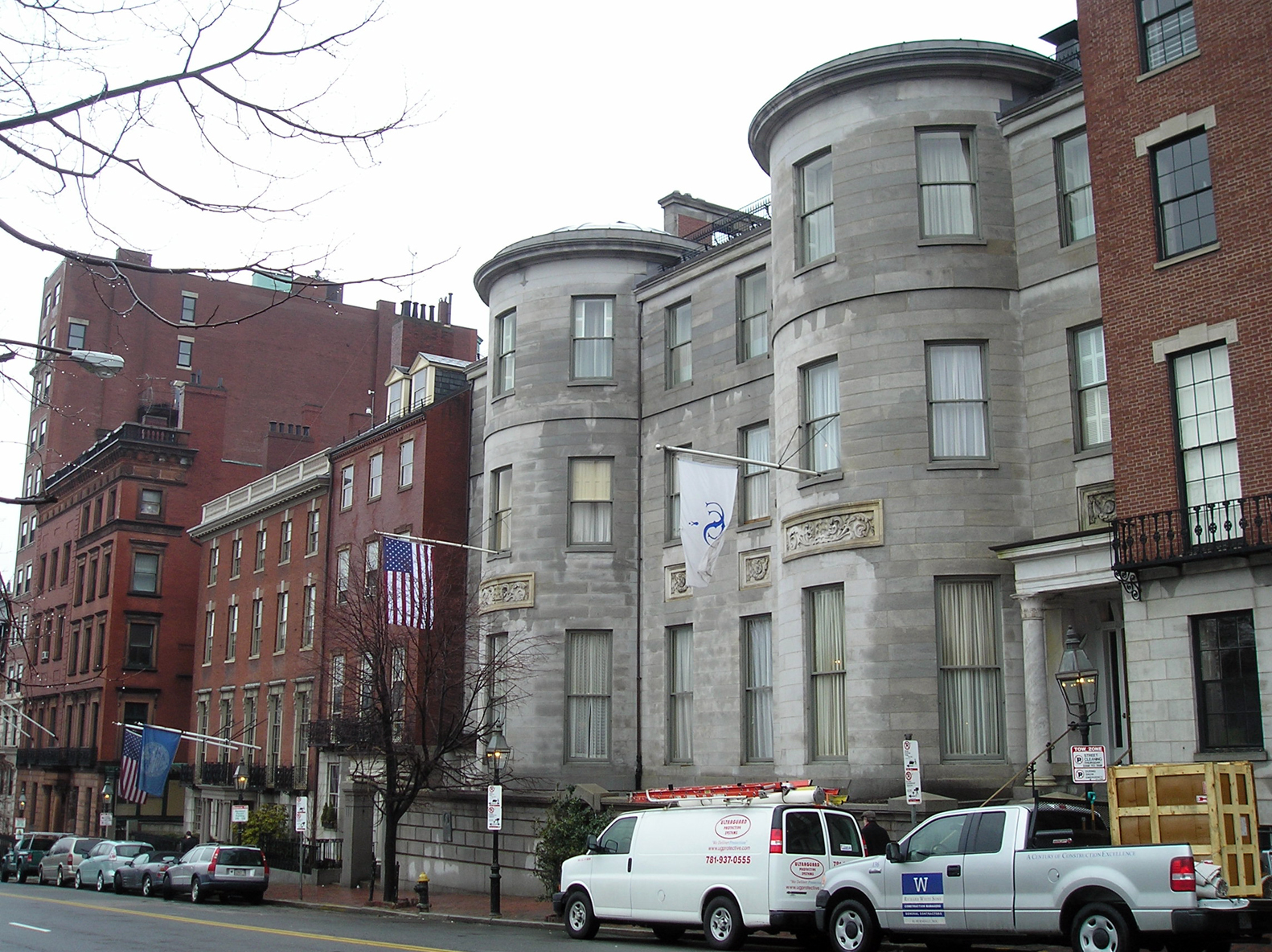
- The gray granite walls of the David Sears House, as seen on Beacon Street
- Location: 42–43 Beacon Street, Boston, Massachusetts
- Coordinates: 42°21′24.66″N 71°4′0.07″W
- Built: 1816
- Architect: Alexander Parris
- Architectural style: Federal
- Part of: Beacon Hill Historic District (ID66000130)
- NRHP reference No.: 70000731

Significant dates
- Added to NRHP: December 30, 1970
- Designated NHL: December 30, 1970
- Designated NHLDCP: October 15, 1966

The David Sears House is a historic house located along Beacon Street in the Beacon Hill neighborhood of Boston, Massachusetts. The three-story house was built in several stages between 1816 and 1875. Now a National Historic Landmark, it was one of the first houses built of granite in the city, and was designed by Alexander Parris for David Sears, a prominent merchant, philanthropist, and landowner. The carved granite panels that adorn the facade were carved by Solomon Willard.

The original 1816 house was a two-story L-shaped structure with a hip roof, with a facade that was seven bays wide. In c. 1824 Sears had the building nearly doubled in size, adding three bays to the facade, and moving the front door to its present location. In 1875, after the building was acquired by the Somerset Club, the third floor was added, changing the roof from a hip to a gable. This work also included renovations to the interior of the first two floors. The building was again enlarged to the rear in 1900, adding additional space for servants.

The house is still owned by Somerset Club, and is not open to the general public. It was designated a National Historic Landmark and listed on the National Register of Historic Places in 1970.

== See also ==
- Nathan Appleton Residence, also a National Historic Landmark, next door
- List of National Historic Landmarks in Boston
- National Register of Historic Places listings in northern Boston, Massachusetts
