= Women's City Club of Boston =

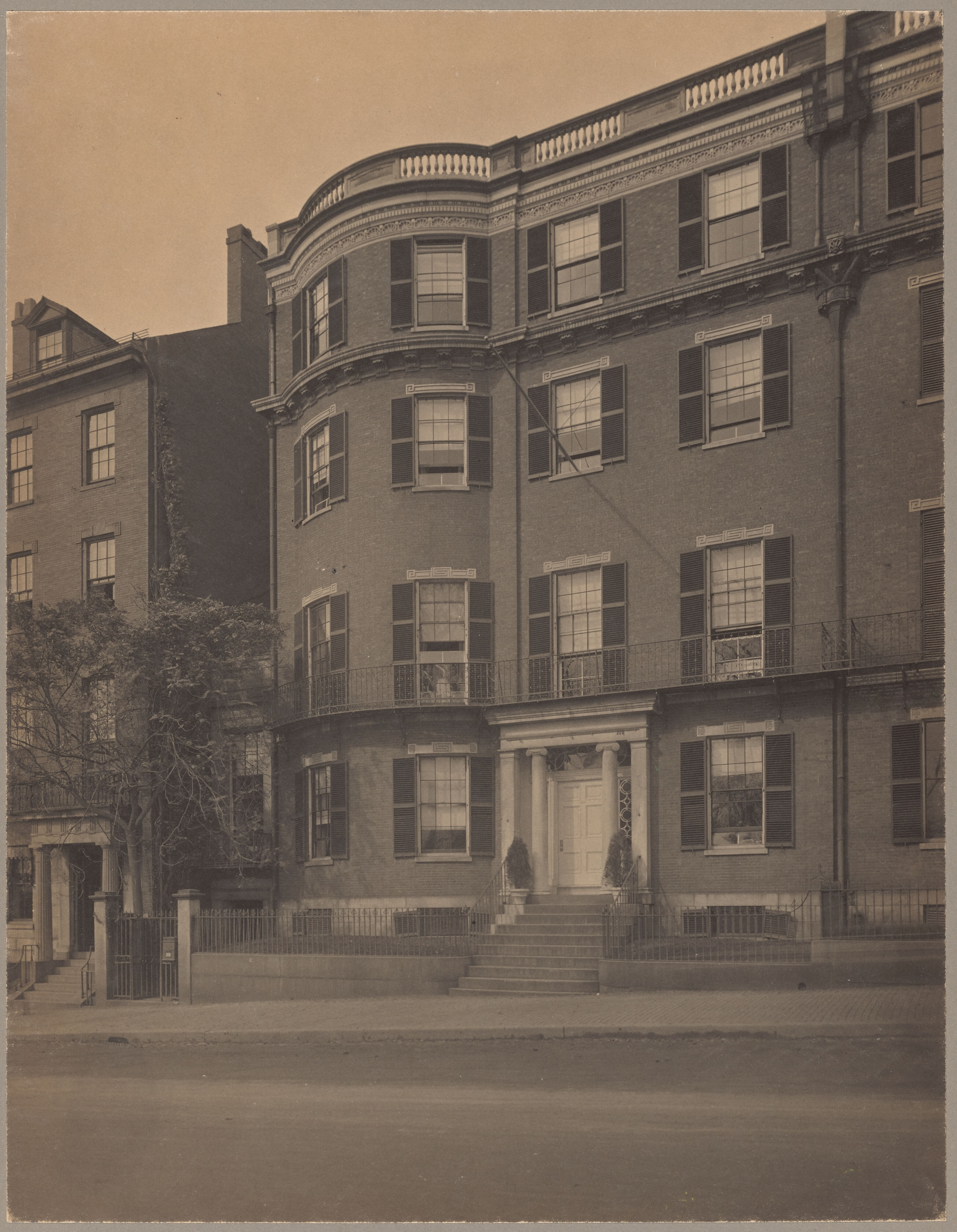
- Women's City Club, 40 Beacon Street, Boston
- Formation: 1913
- Dissolved: 1992
- Headquarters: 39 & 40 Beacon Street
- Location: Boston, Massachusetts
- Members: 5000 (maximum)

The Women's City Club of Boston was a social and civic organization founded in 1913 and known for relief efforts following urban fires and other disasters.

The Club supported charitable causes, mutual aid efforts, and public education. When the USA entered World War I, the Women's City Club of Boston requested permission and turned part of Boston Common into gardens to produce food. From 1914 until 1992, the Club was located in the pair of townhouses known as the Appleton-Parker House. The Club promoted charities, maintained a library, and sponsored lectures and other educational activities. During the 1960s, membership began to decline. In 1991 the Club filed for bankruptcy. In 1992 the headquarters building was sold, and the two townhouses are now subdivided into privately owned condominiums.

From 1922 until at least 1938 the Club published an annual booklet for members: 'Where to Shop and Where to Stop in Boston and along New England Motor Trails'.

This building is currently a pending Boston Landmark by the Boston Landmarks Commission.
