= Nathan Appleton Residence =

Historic house in Boston, Massachusetts

- U.S. National Register of Historic Places
- U.S. National Historic Landmark
- U.S. National Historic Landmark District – Contributing property
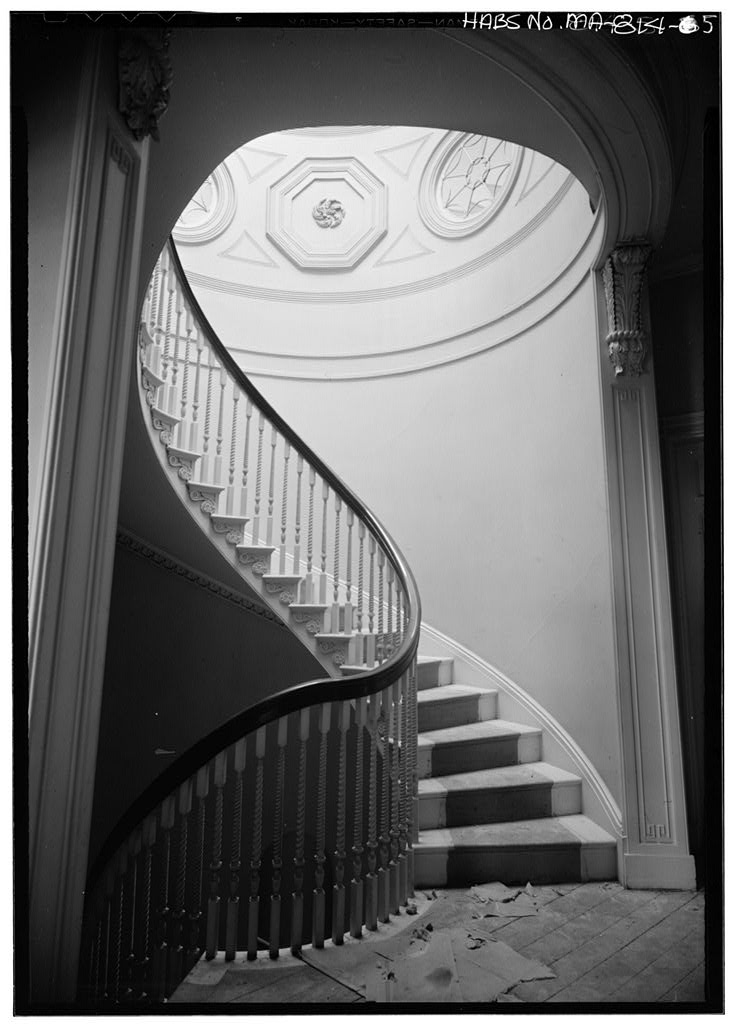
- Interior, Parker House

- Location within Boston Location within Massachusetts Location within the United States
- Location: 39–40 Beacon Street, Boston, Massachusetts
- Coordinates: 42°21′25.06″N 71°3′58.41″W
- Built: 1821
- Architect: Richard Walsh, Alexander Parris
- Part of: Beacon Hill Historic District (ID66000130)
- NRHP reference No.: 77001541

Significant dates
- Added to NRHP: December 22, 1977
- Designated NHL: December 22, 1977
- Designated NHLDCP: October 15, 1966

The Nathan Appleton Residence, also known as the Appleton-Parker House, is a historic house located at 39–40 Beacon Street in the Beacon Hill neighborhood of Boston, Massachusetts. It was designated a National Historic Landmark for its association with revolutionary textile manufacturer Nathan Appleton (1779–1861), and as the site in 1843 of the wedding of his daughter Frances and poet Henry Wadsworth Longfellow. The house is an excellent early 19th century design of Alexander Parris.

== Description ==
This pair of brick townhouses rise three stories, and are joined by a common firewall. When built in 1821, they were essentially mirror images of each other, differing in only relatively minor interior respects. Their main facades are each three bays wide, with the outer bay a rounded projection with two windows. The door to each unit occupied the center bay and is framed by a wooden surround and topped by a fanlight; a Doric portico provides shelter. At the top of each building a low balustrade conceals a low-pitched roof. In the 1870s a fourth floor was added; the original balustrades were retained. The rounded bays of number 39 were altered in the 1880s by the addition of a third window on each level, and what were originally single-story servant wings in the rear of each unit were extended and raised to three stories by later owners.

== History ==
The property here had been owned by painter John Singleton Copley and much of the land had been purchased by Dr. John Joy, who headed a real estate company.

In 1819, Nathan Appleton and business partner Daniel Pinckney Parker bought a house that had been standing on the property and tore it down. They then had the twin house built, designed by architect Alexander Parris and numbered 39 and 40 Beacon Street. In 1843 Appleton's daughter Frances ("Fanny") was married in this house to poet Henry Wadsworth Longfellow. Appleton was one of the great financial minds behind the early industrialization of New England, funding the Boston Manufacturing Company and developing a strategy for selling its products. He parlayed this early success into the later development of major industrial complexes at Lowell and Lawrence, Massachusetts, and also Manchester, New Hampshire. Appleton lived at 39 Beacon Street from 1821 until his death in 1861.

From 1914 to the 1990s it housed the Women's City Club of Boston. It has since been subdivided into condominiums. It was designated a National Historic Landmark in 1977, and is listed on the National Register of Historic Places.

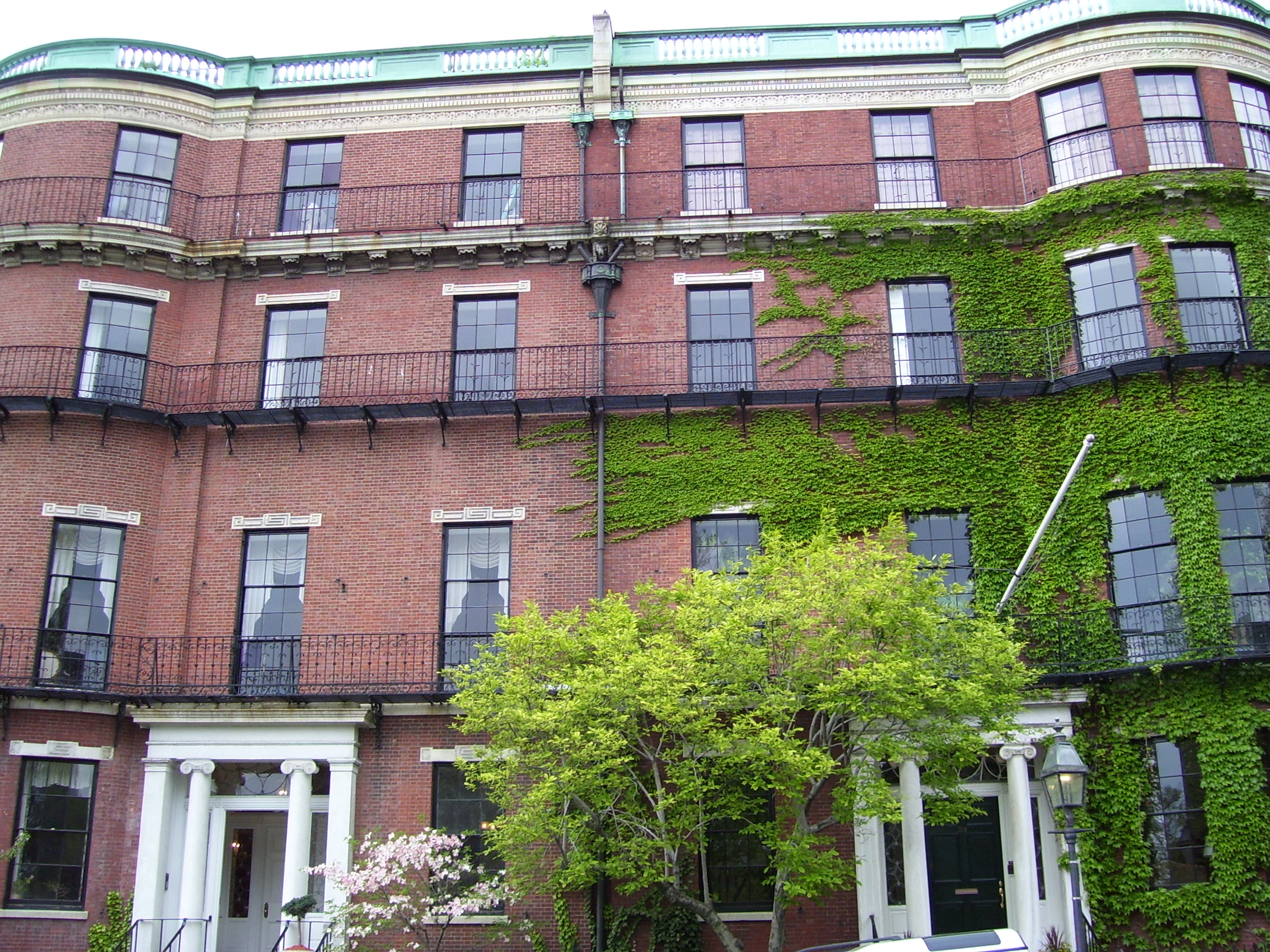
Nathan Appleton House from Boston Common

== See also ==
- David Sears House, also a National Historic Landmark, next door
- List of National Historic Landmarks in Massachusetts
- National Register of Historic Places listings in northern Boston, Massachusetts
