= City FC =

City FC or just City often refers to:

- Manchester City F.C.
- Melbourne City FC
- New York City FC

City FC may also refer to:

== Association football/soccer ==
=== Australia ===
A-League

- Melbourne City FC
  - Melbourne City FC NPL
  - Melbourne City FC (W-League)
  - Melbourne City FC Youth

National Premier Leagues

- Adelaide City FC
- Blacktown City FC
- Brisbane City FC
- Charlestown City Blues FC
- Devonport City FC
- Lake Macquarie City FC
- Launceston City FC
- Hakoah Sydney City East FC
- Hume City FC
- Northcote City FC
- Rockdale City Suns FC

Other clubs

- Bankstown City FC
- Bendigo City FC
- Canberra City FC
- Enfield City FC
- Fremantle City FC
- Gosnells City FC
- Hurstville City Minotaurs FC
- Ipswich City FC
- Kingston City FC
- Knox City FC
- Mandurah City FC
- Malvern City FC
- Moreland City FC
- Nunawading City FC
- Queanbeyan City FC
- Rockingham City FC
- Werribee City FC
- White City FC

=== Ireland ===
- Cork City F.C.
- Dublin City F.C.

=== New Zealand ===
- Napier City Rovers FC
- Papakura City FC
- Waitakere City F.C.

=== South Korea ===
- Cheonan City FC
- Gangneung City FC
- Mokpo City FC
- Suwon City FC
- Yongin City FC

=== United Kingdom ===
==== England ====
Premier League

- Leicester City F.C.
- Manchester City F.C.

Football League Championship

- Birmingham City F.C.
- Bristol City F.C.
- Coventry City F.C.
- Norwich City F.C.
- Stoke City F.C.

Football League One

- Hull City A.F.C.
- Lincoln City F.C.

Football League Two

- Bradford City A.F.C.
- Exeter City F.C.
- Salford City F.C.

National League

- Bath City F.C.
- Chelmsford City F.C.
- Gloucester City A.F.C.
- Oxford City F.C.
- St Albans City F.C.
- York City F.C.

Other men's clubs

- Cambridge City F.C.
- Ely City F.C.
- Truro City F.C.
- Wells City F.C.
- Winchester City F.C.
- Worcester City F.C.

Women's clubs

- Birmingham City L.F.C.
- Bristol City W.F.C.
- Leicester City W.F.C.
- London City Lionesses
- Manchester City W.F.C.
- Stoke City F.C. (Women)

==== Northern Ireland ====
- Armagh City F.C.
- Derry City F.C.

==== Scotland ====
- Brechin City F.C.
- Edinburgh City F.C.
- Elgin City F.C.

==== Wales ====
- Cardiff City F.C.
- Cardiff City FC (women)
- Swansea City A.F.C.
- Swansea City Ladies F.C.

=== United States ===
Major League Soccer

- New York City FC
  - New York City FC Academy

United Soccer League

- Louisville City FC
- Oklahoma City FC (NPSL)

Premier Development League

- FC Miami City
- San Francisco City FC

National Premier Soccer League

- Buffalo City FC
- Charm City FC
- Dallas City FC
- Detroit City FC
- Gate City FC
- Memphis City FC
- Pensacola City FC
- Queen City FC
- Virginia Beach City FC

=== Other countries ===
Americas

- Capital City F.C. (Canada)
- Montevideo City Torque (Uruguay)

Asia

- Chengdu Better City F.C. (China)
- Guangzhou City F.C. (China)
- Heilongjiang Ice City F.C. (China)
- Nanjing City F.C. (China)
- Shenyang City F.C. (China)
- Chennai City FC (India)
- Mumbai City FC (India)
- FC Pune City (India)
- Tokyo Musashino City FC (Japan)

Africa

- Awassa City F.C. (Ethiopia)
- Cape Town City F.C. (NFL) (South Africa, 1962-1977)
- Cape Town City F.C. (2016) (South Africa, from 2016)
- Polokwane City F.C. (South Africa)
- Midas Mbabane City F.C. (Swaziland)

Europe

- Almere City FC (Netherlands)
- Oslo City FC (Norway)
- Malmö City FC (Sweden)

== Other sports ==
- Melbourne City Football Club (1912–13), an Australian rules football club.
