= Patrick Tracy Jackson =

American manufacturer (1780–1847)

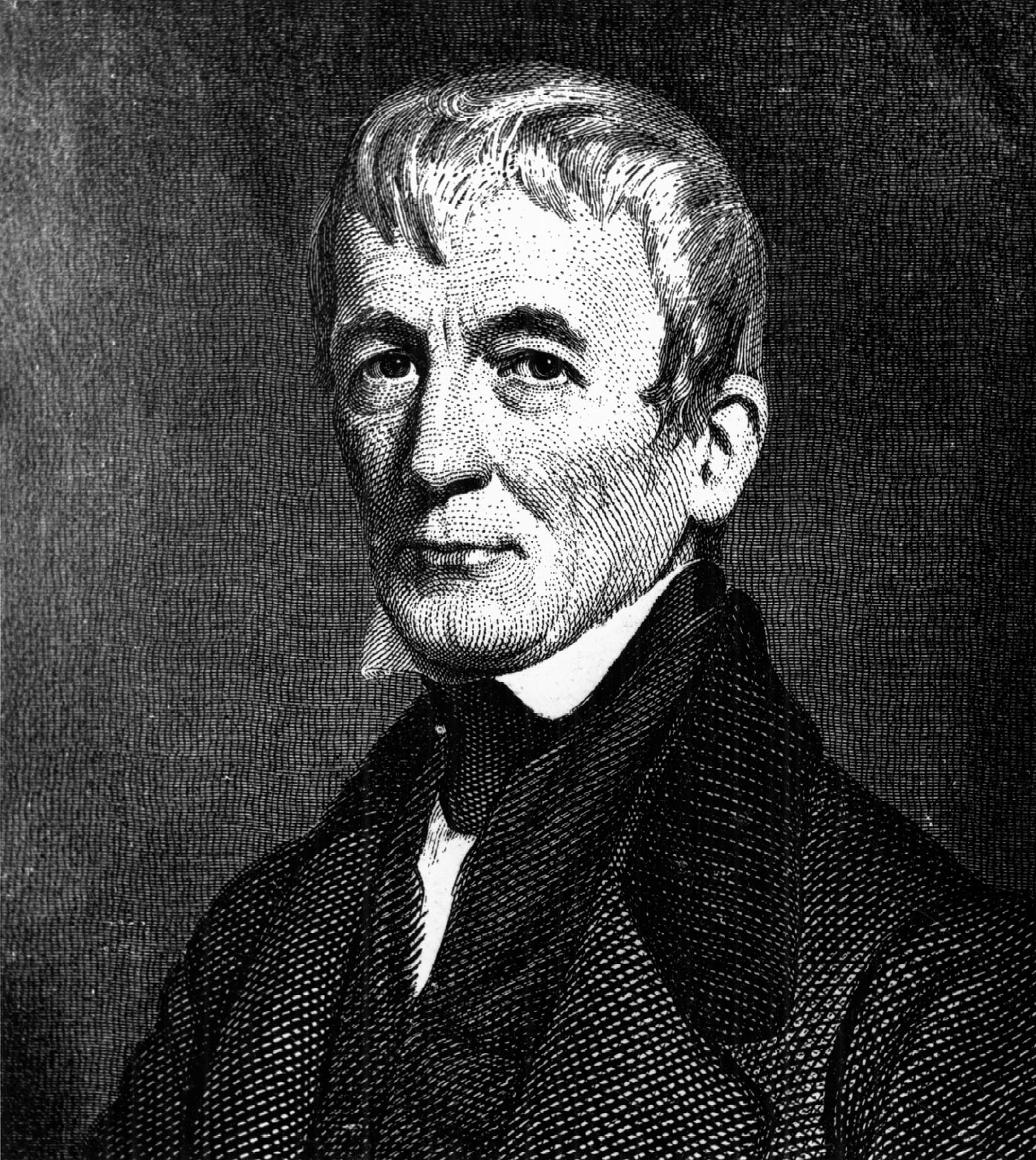
- Born: August 14, 1780; Newburyport, Massachusetts, US
- Died: September 12, 1847 (aged 67); Beverly, Massachusetts, US
- Known for: Boston Manufacturing Company
- Spouse: Lydia Cabot Jackson
- Children: 9 children, including Anna Cabot Jackson Lowell
- Parent(s): Jonathan Jackson and Hannah Tracy Jackson

Patrick Tracy Jackson (August 14, 1780 – September 12, 1847) was an American manufacturer, one of the founders of the Boston Manufacturing Company of Waltham, Massachusetts, and later a founder of the Merrimack Manufacturing Company, whose developments formed the nucleus of Lowell, Massachusetts.

== Early life and education ==
He was born in Newburyport, Massachusetts, the youngest son of Jonathan Jackson and his second wife, Hannah Tracy Jackson, who was the daughter of Irish-born merchant Patrick Tracy.

He enjoyed more schooling than most young men in post-Revolutionary America, attending Newburyport public schools as well as the private Governor Dummer Academy.

Growing up in a commercial family, Jackson was anxious to prove his business acumen, so in 1795, at the age of fifteen, he served as an apprentice clerk to William Bartlett, a wealthy Newburyport merchant and as captain's clerk to his elder brother Henry. He spent several years at sea on behalf of Bartlett and his brother Henry from 1799 to 1808, impressing experienced merchants and sea masters with his drive and knowledge of navigation and maritime commerce. He completed four trading voyages abroad between 1800 and 1807, which gave him the opportunity to gain "experience in the Eastern trade and a respectable capital base".

== Business career ==
Jackson established himself in Boston as a merchant specializing in the East and West Indies trade. Despite curtailed shipping interests during the War of 1812, Jackson collaborated with brother-in-law Francis Cabot Lowell (1775–1817) to establish a textile factory in Waltham, Massachusetts, and founded the Boston Manufacturing Company with him and the other "Boston Associates" in 1813. The Waltham factory was the first to integrate all the steps of converting raw cotton into cotton cloth into one mill building.

On February 10, 1818, Jackson, Daniel Pinckney Parker and other members of the Boston Associates, were granted the charter of the Suffolk Bank by the Massachusetts General Court. Jackson, Parker, the other charter's holders, and the bank's directors met periodically from February 27 to March 19 at the Boston Exchange Coffee House to discuss the organization of the bank. On April 1, 1818, the bank opened for business in rented offices on State Street until the bank moved permanently to the corner of State and Kilby Streets (currently occupied by either 75 State Street or Exchange Place) on April 17. Jackson owned 300 shares of the bank.

By 1820, the limited waterpower of the Charles River led Jackson and his colleagues to establish the Merrimack Manufacturing Company to produce printed calico cloth at the Pawtucket Falls on the Merrimack River. In 1822 he appointed himself as agent of Proprietors of Locks and Canals, gaining the ability to determine "who could start what mill and where in Lowell, and for how much". Incorporated as the town of Lowell, Massachusetts, in 1826, it was named for Francis Cabot Lowell.

In 1830, problems of transportation and communication by canal and turnpike convinced Jackson to oversee the construction of the Boston & Lowell Railroad, the first railroad to receive a charter from the Massachusetts General Court, and established the standard American rail gauge. On May 27, 1835, it made its maiden trip to Boston, with Jackson, George Washington Whistler, and James Baldwin aboard.

Although Jackson had hoped to retire after the railroad began operating in 1835, but his poor business decisions did not make that possible. For example, In the late 1830s, he liquidated nearly all of his interest in the Lowell Mills to invest it into real estate, which turned into a disaster. He died from a sudden attack of dysentery on September 12, 1847.

== Family ==
Coat of Arms of Patrick Tracy Jackson

In 1810 he married Lydia Cabot, whose second cousin Francis Cabot Lowell would become an important business partner (Francis Cabot Lowell was also married to Patrick's sister Hannah). Patrick and Lydia had nine children, including the writer Anna Cabot Jackson Lowell. He was also the brother of Charles Jackson, grandfather of Oliver Wendell Holmes Jr. Holmes' father was a student of another brother, physician James Jackson.

== Sources ==
- Wilson, J. G.; Fiske, J., eds. (1892). "Jackson, Jonathan" . Appletons' Cyclopædia of American Biography. New York: D. Appleton.
- Ripley, George; Dana, Charles A., eds. (1879). "Jackson, Charles" . The American Cyclopædia.
