= Timothy Bigelow (lawyer) =

American lawyer and politician

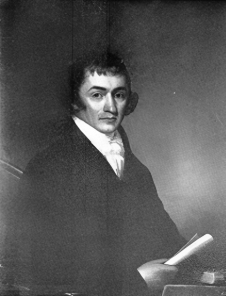
Portrait of Bigelow.

Timothy Bigelow (April 30, 1767 – May 18, 1821) was an American lawyer in early 19th-century Massachusetts.

== Biography ==
Born in Worcester, Massachusetts, to parents Timothy Bigelow and Anna Andrews, Bigelow was educated at Harvard University, where he graduated in 1786. He then studied law, and from 1789 until 1807 he practiced in Groton, Massachusetts. Bigelow unsuccessfully ran against congressman Joseph Bradley Varnum four consecutive times from 1798 to 1804. In 1807, he moved to Medford and opened a law office in Boston. It is said he argued 15,000 cases in the course of his 32-year legal career.

In 1802, he was elected a Fellow of the American Academy of Arts and Sciences. Bigelow was also a founding member of the American Antiquarian Society in 1812. He served as Massachusetts Speaker of the House, 1805–1806, 1808–1810, and 1812–1820. In 1814, he was among the delegates from Massachusetts to the Hartford Convention. In 1818, Bigelow purchased 10 shares of the Suffolk Bank, a clearinghouse bank on State Street in Boston. He died in 1821, at age 55, in Medford.

Timothy married Lucy Prescott (1771-1852; niece of William Prescott) in 1791 in Groton, Massachusetts. They had 7 children, including: Katherine Bigelow (married Abbott Lawrence); Andrew Bigelow; John Prescott Bigelow; Edward; Helen; Francis; and Elizabeth Prescott.

Massachusetts House of Representatives
Preceded by Eleazer Wheelock Ripley	Speaker of the Massachusetts House of Representatives; 1812–1820	Succeeded by Elijah H. Mills
