= 1824 Massachusetts Senate election =

1824 Massachusetts Senate elections
- April–May 1824

All 40 seats in the Massachusetts Senate 21 seats needed for a majority
	Majority party	Minority party
Party	Democratic-Republican	Federalist
Seats won	25	12

Elections to the Massachusetts Senate were held during 1824 to elect State Senators. Candidates were elected at the county level, with some counties electing multiple Senators.

For election, a candidate needed the support of a majority of those voting. If a seat remained vacant because no candidate received such majority, the Massachusetts General Court was empowered to fill it by a majority vote of its members. If more candidates received majorities than there were seats, the top finishers were elected.

Results were certified or rejected by the Governor's Council.

== Apportionment ==
The apportionment of seats by population was as follows:

- Barnstable County: 1
- Berkshire County: 2
- Bristol and Dukes Counties: 3
- Franklin County: 2
- Essex County: 6
- Hampden County: 2
- Hampshire County: 2
- Middlesex County: 5
- Nantucket County: 1
- Plymouth County: 2
- Suffolk County: 6
- Worcester County: 5

== Results ==
=== Barnstable ===
1824 Barnstable Senate election
Party	Candidate	Votes	%
Democratic-Republican	Braddock Dimmick	1,192	70.16%
Federalist	Nymphas Marston	–	–
Total votes		1,699	100.00%

Exact totals for Marston are unknown.

=== Berkshire ===
1824 Berkshire Senate election
Party	Candidate	Votes	%
Democratic-Republican	George Hull	2,832	60.96%
Democratic-Republican	Rodman Hazard	2,786	59.97%
Federalist	Joseph Merrick	1,796	38.66%
Federalist	Eli Ensign	1,742	37.49%
Various	Scattering	147	3.16%
Total votes		4,646	100.00%

Results from Egremont, Florida, and Mount Washington were excluded from the official totals.

=== Bristol and Dukes ===
1824 Bristol Senate election
Party	Candidate	Votes	%
Democratic-Republican	James L. Hodges	2,901	54.31%
Democratic-Republican	John Mason	2,880	53.91%
Democratic-Republican	Solomon Pratt	2,866	53.65%
Federalist	Thomas Rotch	2,841	53.18%
Federalist	Oliver Starkweather	2,830	52.98%
Federalist	Sylvester Brownell	2,829	52.96%
Various	Scattering	20	3.16%
Total votes		5,342	100.00%

Results from Seekonk were rejected, "it appearing by said return that the meeting was held in 1804."

=== Essex ===
1824 Essex Senate election
Party	Candidate	Votes	%
Democratic-Republican	Nathan Noyes	5,347	53.46%
Democratic-Republican	Nathaniel Silsbee	5,343	53.42%
Democratic-Republican	Moses Wingate	5,320	53.19%
Democratic-Republican	John Prince	5,319	53.18%
Democratic-Republican	Aaron Lummus	5,314	53.13%
Democratic-Republican	William W. Parrott	5,065	50.64%
Federalist	Dudley A. Tyng	–	–
Federalist	Nathaniel Hooper	–	–
Federalist	Benjamin Pickman Jr.	–	–
Federalist	Edward S. Rand	–	–
Federalist	James Gardner	–	–
Federalist	John Varnum	–	–
Various	Scattering	–	–
Total votes		10,001	100.00%

Exact totals for the Federalist ticket were not listed.

=== Franklin ===
1824 Franklin Senate election
Party	Candidate	Votes	%
Federalist	George Grennell Jr.	1,823	49.55%
Federalist	Thomas Longley	1,469	39.93%
Federalist	Elihu Hoyt	1,237	33.62%
Democratic-Republican	John Nevers	964	26.20%
Democratic-Republican	Thaddeus Coleman	955	25.96%
Federalist	Ephraim Hastings	627	17.04%
Federalist	Joshua Green	90	2.45%
Democratic-Republican	Solomon Smead	38	1.03%
Democratic-Republican	Medad Alexander	38	1.03%
Federalist	Jonathan Blake Jr.	31	0.84%
Unknown	Asa Howland	28	0.76%
Unknown	Solomon Reed	28	0.76%
Unknown	{{{candidate}}}	1	0.03%
Unknown	Samuel Coolidge	1	0.03%
Unknown	Scattering	46	1.25%
Total votes		3,679	100.00%

Although Grinnell received a majority of the votes received, 33 votes for Grinnell, 20 votes for Longley and 9 votes for Hoyt were rejected from Erving's Grant were rejected by the Governor's Council, "it not being a town or district." Erving's Grant was unincorporated until 1838.

==== General Court ====
1824 Franklin Senate election in the General Court
Party	Candidate	Votes	%
Democratic-Republican	John Nevers	209	92.89%
Federalist	George Grennell Jr.	183	81.33%
Federalist	Thomas Longley	–	–
Federalist	Elihu Hoyt	–	–
Total votes		225	100.00%

=== Hampden ===
1824 Hampden Senate election
Party	Candidate	Votes	%
Democratic-Republican	John Mills	2,353	67.06%
Democratic-Republican	James Fowler	2,286	65.15%
Federalist	Sylvester Emmons	–	–
Federalist	Joel Norcross	–	–
Federalist	Jonathan Dwight Jr.	–	–
Federalist	Alanson Knox	–	–%
Federalist	Israel E. Trask	–	–
Federalist	John Wykes	–	–
Democratic-Republican	Marcus Morton	–	–
Unknown	Solomon Hatch	–	–
Democratic-Republican Party	William Eustis	–	–
Total votes		3,509	100.00%

Results from Chester were rejected, "there being two returns from the same town." The exact totals for Chester are not known.

=== Hampshire ===
1824 Hampshire Senate election
Party	Candidate	Votes	%
Federalist	Joseph Strong	3,494	87.63%
Federalist	David Mack, Jr.	2,101	52.70%
Democratic-Republican	John Wells	1,954	49.01%
Unknown	Justus Forward	91	2.28%
Unknown	William Ward	85	2.13%
Unknown	Enos Smith	79	1.98%
Unknown	Ithamar Conkey	70	1.76%
Unknown	Elihu Lyman	25	0.63%
Unknown	Thomas Shepherd	15	0.38%
Unknown	Philo Dickinson	14	0.35%
Unknown	Charles P. Phelps	14	0.35%
Unknown	James Shepherd	10	0.25%
Unknown	Samuel Porter	1	0.03%
Various	Scattering	25	–
Total votes		3,987	100.00%

Results from Chester were rejected, "there being two returns from the same town." The exact totals for Chester are not known.

=== Middlesex ===
1824 Middlesex Senate election
Party	Candidate	Votes	%
Democratic-Republican	Micah M. Rutter	5,721	65.30%
Democratic-Republican	John Keyes	5,670	64.72%
Democratic-Republican	Levi Thaxter	5,644	64.42%
Democratic-Republican	John Wade	5,473	62.47%
Democratic-Republican	Seth Knowles	5,459	62.31%
Federalist	Cyrus Baldwin	–	–
Federalist	William Hilliard	–	–
Federalist	Abiel Haywood	–	–
Federalist	William Blanchard	–	–
Federalist	Edmund Parker	–	–
Total votes		8,761	100.00%

Exact totals for Federalist ticket are not listed.

The following men also received votes, though their exact totals are unknown:

- Uriah Hagar
- William Austin
- Thomas Bacon
- Isaac Bemis, Jr.
- Hilbe Bridge
- Daniel Brooks
- Samuel Dana
- Edmund Foster
- Luther Harrington
- Ebenezer Hobbs
- Nathan Hobbs
- Jonathan Perham
- Jacob Reves
- Abel Wheeler

=== Nantucket ===
1824 Nantucket Senate election
Party	Candidate	Votes	%
Federalist	Barker Burnell	362	99.45%
Various	Scattering	2	0.55%
Total votes		364	100.00%

Burnell was a member of the Federalist Party but was also supported by the Democratic-Republicans.

=== Norfolk ===
1824 Norfolk Senate election
Party	Candidate	Votes	%
Democratic-Republican	John Ruggles	3,440	67.24%
Democratic-Republican	Sherman Leland	3,353	65.54%
Democratic-Republican	Josiah J. Fiske	3,210	62.74%
Total votes		5,116	100.00%

The following men also received votes as Federalist candidates, though their exact totals are unknown:

- Thomas Greenleaf
- Nathaniel Miller
- David S. Greenough
- John Cotter, Jr.
- Francis C. Gray
- Samuel Hubbard
- Heman Lincoln
- Theodore Lyman II
- Jonathan Phillips

=== Plymouth ===
1824 Plymouth Senate election
Party	Candidate	Votes	%
Democratic-Republican	Seth Sprague	3,016	57.24%
Democratic-Republican	Joseph Richardson	3,010	57.13%
Federalist	Barnabas Hedge	2,253	42.76%
Federalist	Thomas Hobart	2,183	41.43%
Various	Scattering	71	1.35%
Total votes		5,269	100.00%

Nathaniel Davis (Federalist), Charles Tuner (Republican), and William Davis (Republican) also received votes.

=== Suffolk ===
1824 Suffolk Senate election
Party	Candidate	Votes	%
Federalist	Samuel Hubbard	3,529	54.35%
Federalist	Francis C. Gray	3,372	51.95%
Federalist	Theodore Lyman II	3,340	51.46%
Federalist	Heman Lincoln	3,313	51.04%
Democratic-Republican	Thomas L. Winthrop	3,293	50.73%
Democratic-Republican	George Odiorne	3,246	50.01%
Federalist	Jonathan Phillips	3,211	49.47%
Federalist	John Cotton	3,163	48.73%
Democratic-Republican	Nathaniel P. Russell	3,149	48.51%
Democratic-Republican	James T. Austin	3,115	47.99%
Democratic-Republican	Samuel Wells	3,032	46.71%
Democratic-Republican	Jonathan Mason	3,013	46.42%
Various	Scattering	170	2.62%
Total votes		6,491	100.00%

=== Worcester ===
1824 Worcester Senate election
Party	Candidate	Votes	%
Federalist	Stephen P. Gardner	6,179	55.02%
Federalist	Benjamin Adams	6,171	54.95%
Federalist	Aaron Tufts	6,127	54.55%
Federalist	Joseph G. Kendall	6,122	53.25%
Federalist	Nathaniel P. Denny	6,052	53.25%
Democratic-Republican	Nathaniel Houghton	–	–
Democratic-Republican	Edmund Cushing	–	–
Democratic-Republican	Daniel Thurber	–	–
Democratic-Republican	John Brown	–	–
Democratic-Republican	Joseph Davis	–	–
Total votes		11,231	100.00%

Exact totals for the Republican ticket are unknown. Many other candidates received votes throughout the county, but their exact totals are unknown:

- Nathaniel Jones
- Salem Towne
- John Davis
- Bezaleel Taft Jr.
- Edmund Curtis
- Austin Denny
- Jabez Hamilton
- Nicholas MacClure
- Henry Penniman
- Asa Russell
- John Allen
- Arnold Barton
- Joshua Brown
- Phinehas Gay
- Samuel Mixter
- Joel Olds
- John Shepley

== See also ==
- 1825–1826 Massachusetts legislature
- List of former districts of the Massachusetts Senate
