= 1828–1829 Massachusetts legislature =

American state legislature

50th Massachusetts General Court
←	48th	50th	→

Overview
- Legislative body: General Court
- Term: May 1828 – May 1829

Senate
- Members: 40
- President: Sherman Leland

House
- Speaker: William B. Calhoun

Sessions
- 1st: May 28, 1828 – June 12, 1828
- 2nd: January 7, 1829 – March 4, 1829

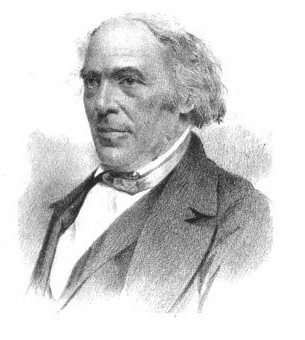
Sherman Leland, Senate president.

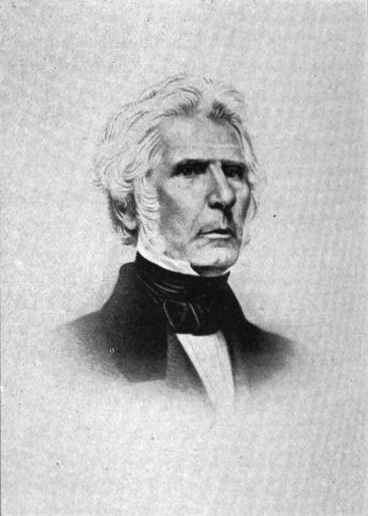
William Calhoun, House speaker.

Leaders of the Massachusetts General Court, 1829.

The 50th Massachusetts General Court, consisting of the Massachusetts Senate and the Massachusetts House of Representatives, met in 1829 during the governorship of Levi Lincoln Jr. Sherman Leland served as president of the Senate and William B. Calhoun served as speaker of the House.

== Senators ==
- John R. Adan
- Robert F. Barnard
- Joseph Bowman
- Barker Burnell
- Edmund Cushing
- Joseph Davis
- Samuel F. Dickinson
- James H. Duncan
- Joseph Estabrook
- Luke Fiske
- James Fowler
- Thomas French
- Francis C. Gray
- Nathan Hale
- Elihu Hoyt
- William C. Jarvis
- John Keyes
- Samuel Lathrop
- Sherman Leland
- James Lewis, Jr.
- John W. Lincoln
- Thomas Longley
- Howard Lothrop
- Charles Mattoon
- John Merrill
- John A. Parker
- William W. Parrott
- Elisha Pope
- Josiah Robbins
- James Savage
- Amos Spaulding
- Joseph E. Sprague
- Seth Sprague, Jr.
- Lewis Strong
- William Thorndike
- Benjamin F. Varnum
- Christopher Webb
- Charles Wells
- Thomas Welsh, Jr.
- William Wood

== Representatives ==
- Caleb Davis (resigned)
- Nathaniel Gorham
- Tristram Dalton
- Samuel Allyne Otis
- Artemas Ward
- James Warren
- Theodore Sedgwick
- David Cobb
- Edward H. Robbins
- John Coffin Jone
- Harrison Gray Otis
- Timothy Bigelow
- Perez Morton
- Joseph Story (resigned)
- Eleazer W. Ripley
- Elijah H. Mills (resigned)
- Josiah Quincy (resigned)
- Luther Lawrence
- Levi Lincoln
- William Jarvis

== See also ==
- 20th United States Congress
- 21st United States Congress
- List of Massachusetts General Courts
