= 1830–1831 Massachusetts legislature =

American state legislature

51st Massachusetts General Court
←	50th	52nd	→

Overview
- Legislative body: General Court
- Term: May 1830 – May 1831

Senate
- Members: 40
- President: James Fowler

House
- Speaker: William B. Calhoun

Sessions
- 1st: May 26, 1830 – June 7, 1830
- 2nd: January 5, 1831 – March 19, 1831

The 51st Massachusetts General Court, consisting of the Massachusetts Senate and the Massachusetts House of Representatives, met in 1830 and 1831 during the governorship of Levi Lincoln Jr. James Fowler served as president of the Senate and William B. Calhoun served as speaker of the House.

== Senators ==
- Daniel Baxter
- Russell Brown
- Barker Burnell
- Pliny Cutler
- Henry A. S. Dearborn
- James H. Duncan
- Alexander H. Everett
- James Fowler
- Thomas J. Goodwin
- Francis C. Gray
- William S. Hastings
- Charles J. Holmes
- Elihu Hoyt
- Elijah Ingraham
- Samuel Lathrop
- John W. Lincoln
- Solomon Lincoln, Jr.
- John Locke
- Howard Lothrop
- Sylvester Maxwell
- Samuel McKay
- John Merrill
- Samuel Mixter
- Thomas Motley
- John A. Parker
- Stephen C. Phillips
- Elisha Pope
- Amos Spaulding
- Asahel Stearns
- Moses Thatcher
- William Thorndike
- Benjamin F. Varnum
- Lovell Walker
- John Warner
- Oliver Warner
- Christopher Webb
- Charles Wells
- Stephen White
- David Wilder
- Francis Winship

== Representative ==
- Joseph T. Adams

== See also ==
- 21st United States Congress
- 22nd United States Congress
- List of Massachusetts General Courts
