= 1829–1830 Massachusetts legislature =

American state legislature

50th Massachusetts General Court
←	49th	51st	→

Overview
- Legislative body: General Court
- Term: May 1829 – May 1830

Senate
- Members: 40
- President: Samuel Lathrop

House
- Speaker: William B. Calhoun

Sessions
- 1st: May 27, 1829 – June 12, 1829
- 2nd: January 6, 1830 – March 13, 1830

The 50th Massachusetts General Court, consisting of the Massachusetts Senate and the Massachusetts House of Representatives, met in 1829 and 1830 during the governorship of Levi Lincoln Jr. Samuel Lathrop served as president of the Senate and William B. Calhoun served as speaker of the House.

William B. Calhoun, as House Speaker, was most notable for passing legislation like the town planning act (Resolves 1829, c 50) requiring detailed town surveys and maps for state submission and reflecting early state efforts in mapping and infrastructure.

Levi Lincoln Jr. (1782–1868) was a prominent Massachusetts lawyer and politician, serving as the state's 13th governor for a record nine consecutive years (1825–1834). He led the formation of the National Republican Party with Daniel Webster and overseeing significant state development like the Blackstone Canal, while also serving in the U.S. Congress.

== Senators ==
- Robert F. Barnard
- Daniel Baxter
- Barker Burnell
- Rufus Choate
- Pliny Cutler
- Philo Dickinson
- James H. Duncan
- James Fowler
- Thomas French
- Thomas I. Goodwin
- Nathan Hale
- Jacob Hall
- William S. Hastings
- Charles I. Holmes
- Elihu Hoyt
- Samuel Lathrop
- Sherman Leland
- James Lewis
- John W. Lincoln
- Howard Lothrop
- Sylvester Maxwell
- Samuel M. McKay
- John Merrill
- Samuel Mixter
- John A. Parker
- John Pickering
- Elisha Pope
- Amos Spaulding
- Seth Sprague, Jr.
- William Thorndike
- Charles Train
- Benjamin F. Varnum
- Lovell Walker
- Oliver Warner
- Christopher Webb
- Charles Wells
- David Wilder
- Francis Winship
- William Wood

== Representatives ==
- Cyrus Alger

== See also ==
- 21st United States Congress
- List of Massachusetts General Courts
