= 1826–1827 Massachusetts legislature =

American state legislature

47th Massachusetts General Court
←	46th	48th	→

Overview
- Legislative body: General Court
- Term: May 1826 – May 1827

Senate
- Members: 40
- President: John Mills

House
- Speaker: William C. Jarvis

Sessions
- 1st: May 31, 1826 – June 20, 1826
- 2nd: January 3, 1827 – March 10, 1827

The 47th Massachusetts General Court, consisting of the Massachusetts Senate and the Massachusetts House of Representatives, met in 1826 and 1827 during the governorship of Levi Lincoln Jr. John Mills served as president of the Senate and William C. Jarvis served as speaker of the House.

== Senators ==
- James T. Austin
- Israel Billings
- Samuel Billings
- Peter Briggs
- Barker Burnell
- William Crawford, Jr.
- Caleb Cushing
- William Ellis
- Josiah J. Fiske
- Luke Fiske
- Joshua Frost
- Henry Gardner
- George Grennell Jr.
- David Henshaw
- Nathaniel Houghton
- Abel Jewett
- Joseph G. Kendall
- Thomas Kendall
- John Keyes
- Nymphas Marston
- John Mason
- John Mills
- Asa T. Newhall
- Leonard M. Parker
- Peter H. Peirce
- Charles P. Phelps
- Solomon Pratt
- John Prince
- Joseph Richardson
- Nathaniel P. Russell
- David Sears
- Samuel Shears
- Jonas Sibley
- Amos Spaulding
- Bezaleel Taft Jr.
- Israel Trask
- Joseph Tripp
- Benjamin F. Varnum
- William Whitaker
- Stephen White

== Representatives ==
- William Barry

== See also ==
- 19th United States Congress
- 20th United States Congress
- List of Massachusetts General Courts
