= 1830 Massachusetts gubernatorial election =

- April 5, 1830
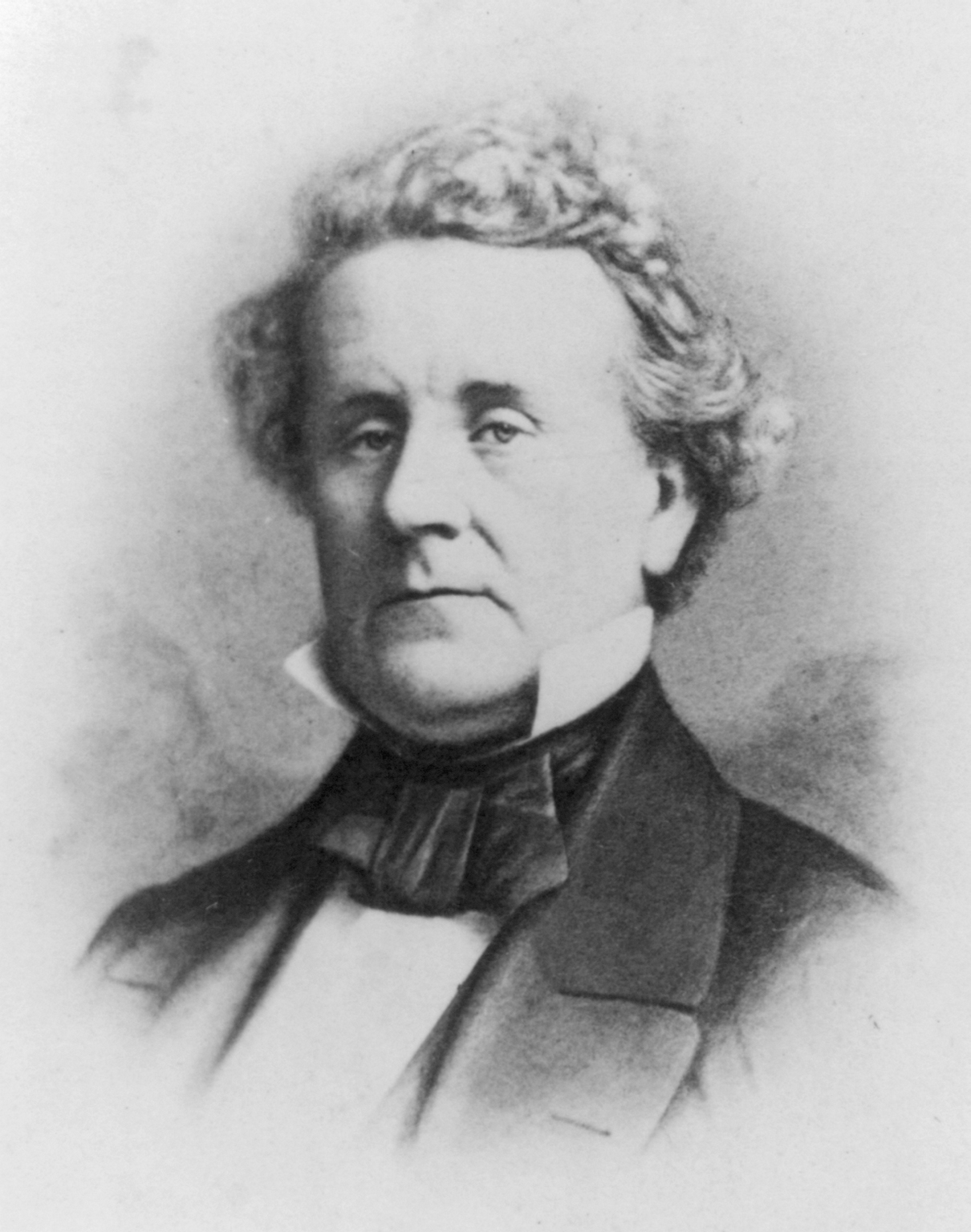

Nominee	Levi Lincoln Jr.	Marcus Morton
Party	National Republican	Democratic
Popular vote	30,908	14,440
Percentage	65.52%	30.61%
- County results Lincoln: 40–50% 50–60% 60–70% 70–80% 80–90% Morton: 50–60%
Governor before election
Levi Lincoln Jr.
National Republican
Elected Governor
Levi Lincoln Jr.
National Republican

The 1830 Massachusetts gubernatorial election was held on April 5.

National Republican Governor Levi Lincoln Jr. was re-elected to a sixth term in office over Democrat Marcus Morton.

== General election ==
=== Candidates ===
- Levi Lincoln Jr., incumbent governor since 1825 (National Republican)
- Marcus Morton, associate justice of the Supreme Judicial Court, former acting governor and nominee since 1828 (Democratic)

=== Campaign ===
For the first time, Justice Morton consented to his nomination. Privately, he expressed little hope of success and said that he did not hope to obtain more than one third of the votes.

David Henshaw's Statesman campaigned vigorously for Morton, upbraiding Lincoln as a renegade Republican who had accepted support of the Essex Junto and lauding Morton's support for the Warren Bridge Company. Theodore Lyman II's rival Democratic Evening Bulletin made no effort on Morton's behalf.

Lincoln took little interest in the election, focusing on new projects for railroads and Massachusetts's claim for war debts against the federal government.

=== Results ===
Lincoln was once again victorious, though by a dramatically reduced margin. Morton wrote to John C. Calhoun to express his view that the Jackson administration had cost him several thousand votes by dismissing Henshaw supporters from federal office to placate the aristocratic Lyman wing of the party.

1830 Massachusetts gubernatorial election
Party	Candidate	Votes	%	±%
National Republican	Levi Lincoln Jr. (incumbent)	30,908	65.52%	▼6.11
Democratic	Marcus Morton	14,440	30.61%	▲11.11
Write-in		1,825	3.87%	▼5.00
Total votes		47,173	100.00%	

== See also ==
- 1829–1830 Massachusetts legislature
