= 1829 Massachusetts gubernatorial election =

- April 6, 1829
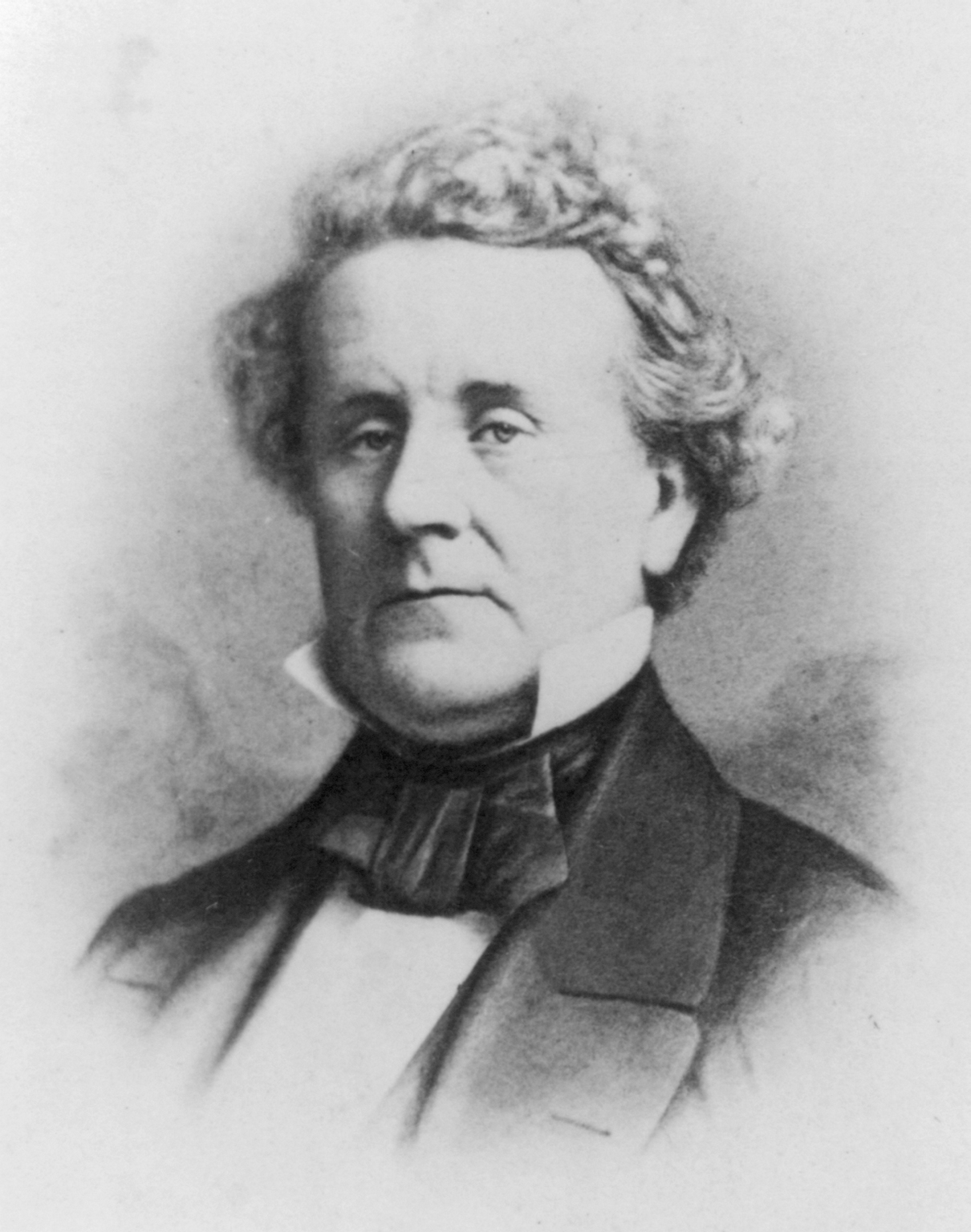

Nominee	Levi Lincoln Jr.	Marcus Morton
Party	National Republican	Democratic
Popular vote	25,217	6,864
Percentage	71.63%	19.50%
- County results Lincoln: 40–50% 60–70% 70–80% 80–90% >90% Write-in: 40–50%
Governor before election
Levi Lincoln Jr.
Adams Republican
Elected Governor
Levi Lincoln Jr.
National Republican

The 1829 Massachusetts gubernatorial election was held on April 6.

National Republican Governor Levi Lincoln Jr. was re-elected to a fifth term in office over Democrat Marcus Morton.

== General election ==
=== Candidates ===
- Levi Lincoln Jr., incumbent governor since 1825 (National Republican)
- Marcus Morton, associate justice of the Supreme Judicial Court, former acting governor and nominee in 1828 (Democratic)

=== Campaign ===
Justice Morton once again refused his candidacy, but was nonetheless promoted by David Henshaw against his wishes, for want of a willing candidate. Nevertheless, Morton privately took personal and political pride in the support he did receive, taking it as evidence the new Democratic Party could be a success.

=== Results ===
With low turnout and Morton's refusal, the election was a landslide for Lincoln. Morton carried 35 towns, 17 more than he had carried in 1828.

1829 Massachusetts gubernatorial election
Party	Candidate	Votes	%	±%
National Republican	Levi Lincoln Jr. (incumbent)	25,217	71.63%	▼9.90
Democratic	Marcus Morton	6,864	19.50%	▲6.79
Write-in		3,123	8.87%	▲3.29
Total votes		35,204	100.00%	

== See also ==
- 1829–1830 Massachusetts legislature
