= 1827–1828 Massachusetts legislature =

American state legislature

48th Massachusetts General Court
←	47th	49th	→

Overview
- Legislative body: General Court
- Term: May 1827 – May 1828

Senate
- Members: 40
- President: John Mills

House
- Speaker: William C. Jarvis

Sessions
- 1st: May 30, 1827 – June 16, 1827
- 2nd: January 2, 1828 – March 13, 1828

The 48th Massachusetts General Court, consisting of the Massachusetts Senate and the Massachusetts House of Representatives, met in 1827 and 1828 during the governorship of Levi Lincoln Jr. John Mills served as president of the Senate and William C. Jarvis served as speaker of the House.

== Committees ==
- Joint committees: Accounts; Banks, Banking and Insurance; Bridges; Claims; Fisheries; Library; Manufactures; Militia; Parishes and Religious Societies; Public Lands; Roads and Canals; Towns.

== Senators ==
- Gideon Barstow
- Israel Billings
- Joseph Bowman
- Peter Briggs
- Barker Burnell
- Joseph Davis
- Jonathan Dwight, Jr.
- William Ellis
- Luke Fiske
- Henry Gardner
- Francis C. Gray
- Joseph B. Hill
- Elihu Hoyt
- Abel Jewett
- Joseph G. Kendall
- John Keyes
- John W. Lincoln
- Thomas Longley
- Caleb Loring
- Howard Lothrop
- Nymphas Marston
- John Merrill
- John Mills
- Asa T. Newhall
- Leonard M. Parker
- Charles P. Phelps
- Jonathan Phillips
- Peter H. Pierce
- John Prince
- Nathaniel P. Russell
- Amos Spaulding
- Seth Sprague, Jr.
- William Sturgis
- Israel Trask
- Aaron Tufts
- Benjamin F. Varnum
- Christopher Webb
- Thomas Welch, Jr.
- Lemuel Williams Jr.
- William Wood

== See also ==
- 20th United States Congress
- List of Massachusetts General Courts
