= 1828 Massachusetts gubernatorial election =

- April 7, 1828
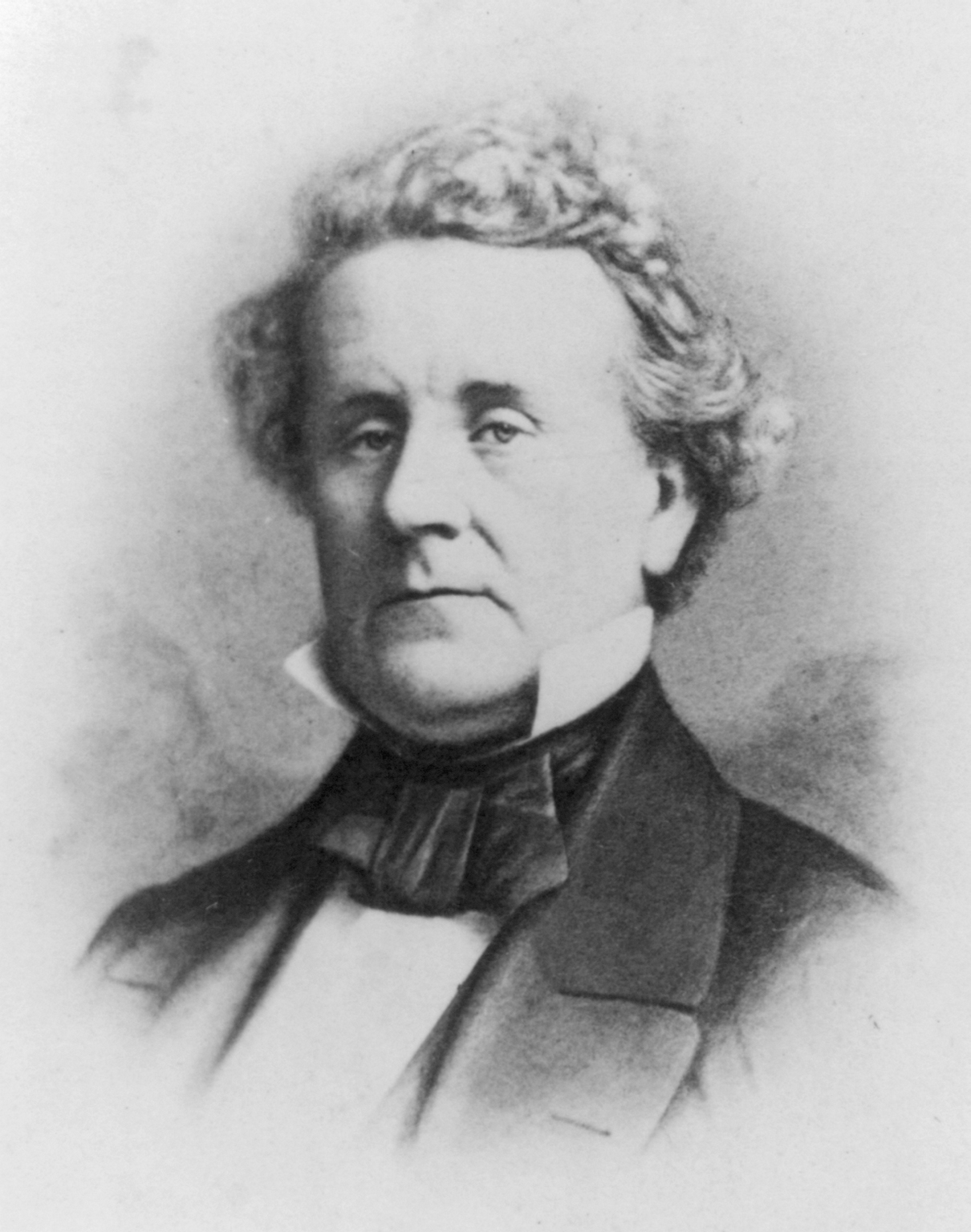

Nominee	Levi Lincoln Jr.	Marcus Morton
Party	Anti-Jacksonian	Jacksonian
Popular vote	25,217	4,423
Percentage	81.53%	12.89%
- County results Lincoln: 60–70% 70–80% 80–90% >90%
Governor before election
Levi Lincoln Jr.
Anti-Jacksonian
Elected Governor
Levi Lincoln Jr.
Anti-Jacksonian

The 1828 Massachusetts gubernatorial election was held on April 7.

Governor Levi Lincoln Jr., an Adams supporter, was re-elected to a fourth term in office over Democrat Marcus Morton, of the Jacksonian faction.

== General election ==
=== Candidates ===
- Levi Lincoln Jr., incumbent governor since 1825 (Anti-Jacksonian)
- Marcus Morton, associate justice of the Supreme Judicial Court and former acting governor (Jacksonian)

=== Results ===
Morton carried only eighteen towns, all of them rural with the exception of Charlestown. The others were Adams, Cheshire, New Ashford, Alford, Tyringham, Montgomery, Westfield, Southwick, Holland, Dana, Charlton, Oxford, Sutton, Seekonk, Berkley, Freetown, and Woburn.

1828 Massachusetts gubernatorial election
Party	Candidate	Votes	%	±%
Anti-Jacksonian	Levi Lincoln Jr. (incumbent)	27,981	81.53%	▲7.32
Jacksonian	Marcus Morton	4,423	12.89%	N/A
Write-in		1,914	5.58%	▼1.99
Total votes		34,318	100.00%	

== See also ==
- 1827–1828 Massachusetts legislature
