= Senator Hobart (disambiguation) =

John Sloss Hobart (1738–1805) was a U.S. Senator from New York in 1798. Senator Hobart may also refer to:

- Aaron Hobart (1787–1858), Massachusetts State Senate
- Garret Hobart (1844–1899), New Jersey State Senate
- Harrison Carroll Hobart (1815–1902), Wisconsin State Senate
