= Senator Maxwell =

Senator Maxwell may refer to:

- Augustus Maxwell (1820–1903), Confederate States Senator from Florida
- Chip Maxwell (born 1962), Nebraska State Senate
- Clark Maxwell Jr. (1934–2011), Florida State Senate
- Edwin Maxwell (politician) (1825–1903), West Virginia State Senate
- Joe Maxwell (born 1957), Missouri State Senate
- Randy Maxwell (fl. 2020s), Indiana State Senate
- Sylvester Maxwell (1775–1858), Massachusetts State Senate
- W. Henry Maxwell (1935–2010), Virginia State Senate
- Walter Maxwell (1836–1896), Wisconsin State Senate
