= 1827 Massachusetts gubernatorial election =

- April 1, 1827
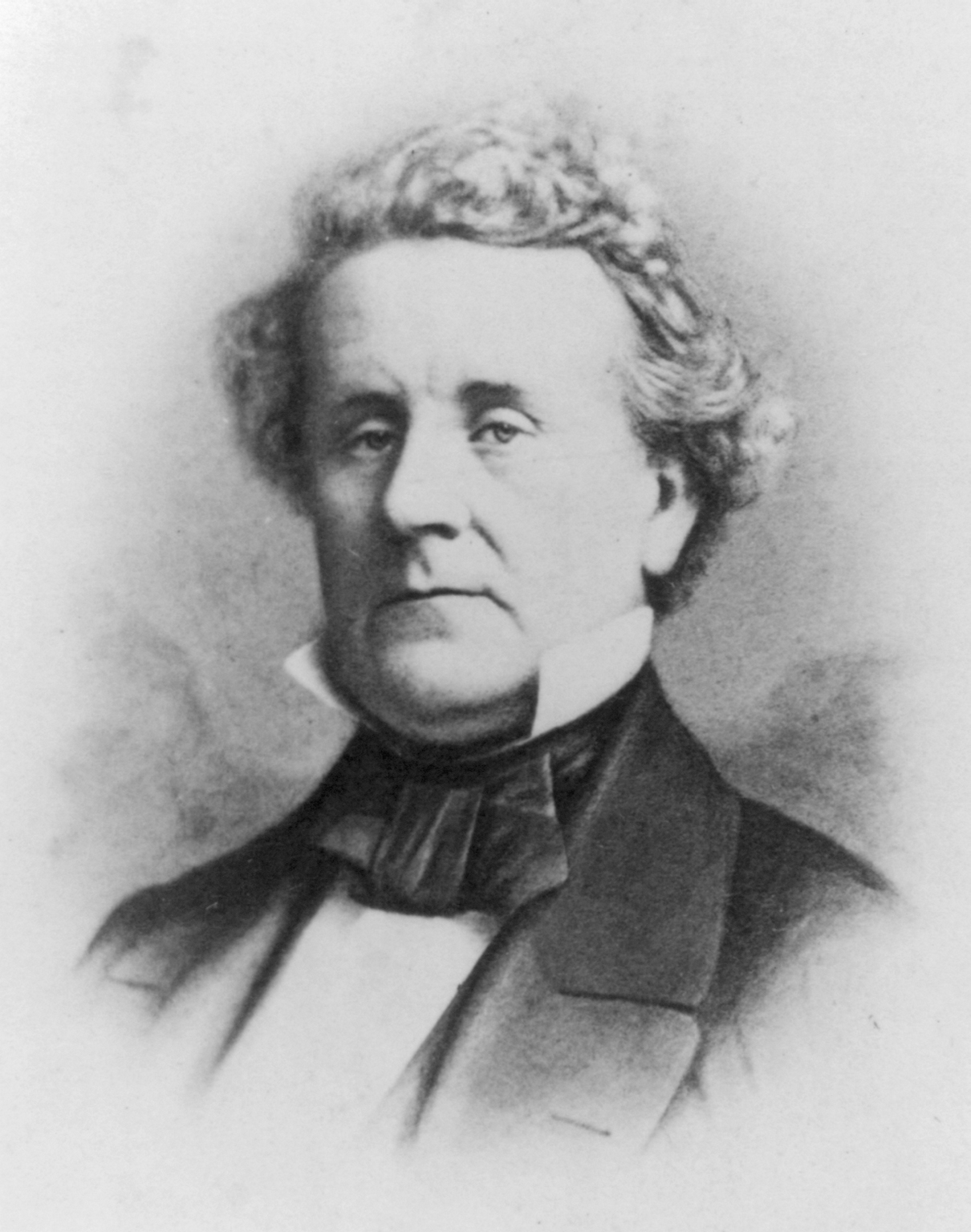

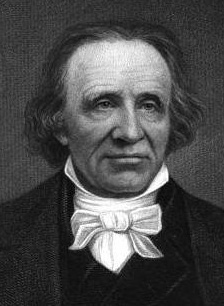
Nominee	Levi Lincoln Jr.	William Jarvis
Party	Adams Republican	Free Bridge Republican
Popular vote	29,029	7,130
Percentage	74.21%	18.23%
- County results Lincoln: 60–70% 70–80% 80–90% >90% Jarvis: 50–60%
Governor before election
Levi Lincoln Jr.
Anti-Jacksonian
Elected Governor
Levi Lincoln Jr.
Anti-Jacksonian

The 1827 Massachusetts gubernatorial election was held on April 1.

Governor Levi Lincoln Jr., an Adams Republican, was re-elected to a third term in office over William Jarvis, nominated on a "free bridge" platform. Jarvis declined to actively run for the office and his support was effectively limited to Middlesex and Essex, where the bridge issue was salient; in most other counties, he received only a handful of votes.

== Background ==
In 1826, controversy arose over the Warren Bridge Company's proposal to build a toll-free bridge over the Charles River, which would connect Boston to Charlestown and deprive the existing Charles River Bridge Company of business.

The bill establishing the bridge passed both houses of the Massachusetts General Court, but was returned without signature by Governor Levi Lincoln Jr. Lincoln's decision drew criticism from populist elements opposed to the conservative Charles River Bridge Company and from Middlesex County farmers who would have utilized the toll-free bridge to ship their produce into Boston. Middlesex residents who had backed Governor Lincoln in 1826 refused to renominate him and instead chose William Jarvis, who declined to actively run.

== General election ==
=== Candidates ===
- William Jarvis, wool merchant (Free Bridge Republican)
- Levi Lincoln Jr., incumbent governor since 1825 (Adams Republican)

=== Results ===
Lincoln easily won re-election without an active opponent. Jarvis did win several towns in Middlesex, and carried the county as a whole. In rural Southern and Western Massachusetts, some Old Republicans cast votes for Marcus Morton.

1827 Massachusetts gubernatorial election
Party	Candidate	Votes	%	±%
Anti-Jacksonian	Levi Lincoln Jr. (incumbent)	29,029	74.21%	▲6.18
Jacksonian	William Jarvis	7,130	18.23%	N/A
Write-in		2,960	7.57%	▲4.14
Total votes		39,119	100.00%	

== See also ==
- 1825–1826 Massachusetts legislature
