= April 1831 Massachusetts gubernatorial election =

- April 14, 1831
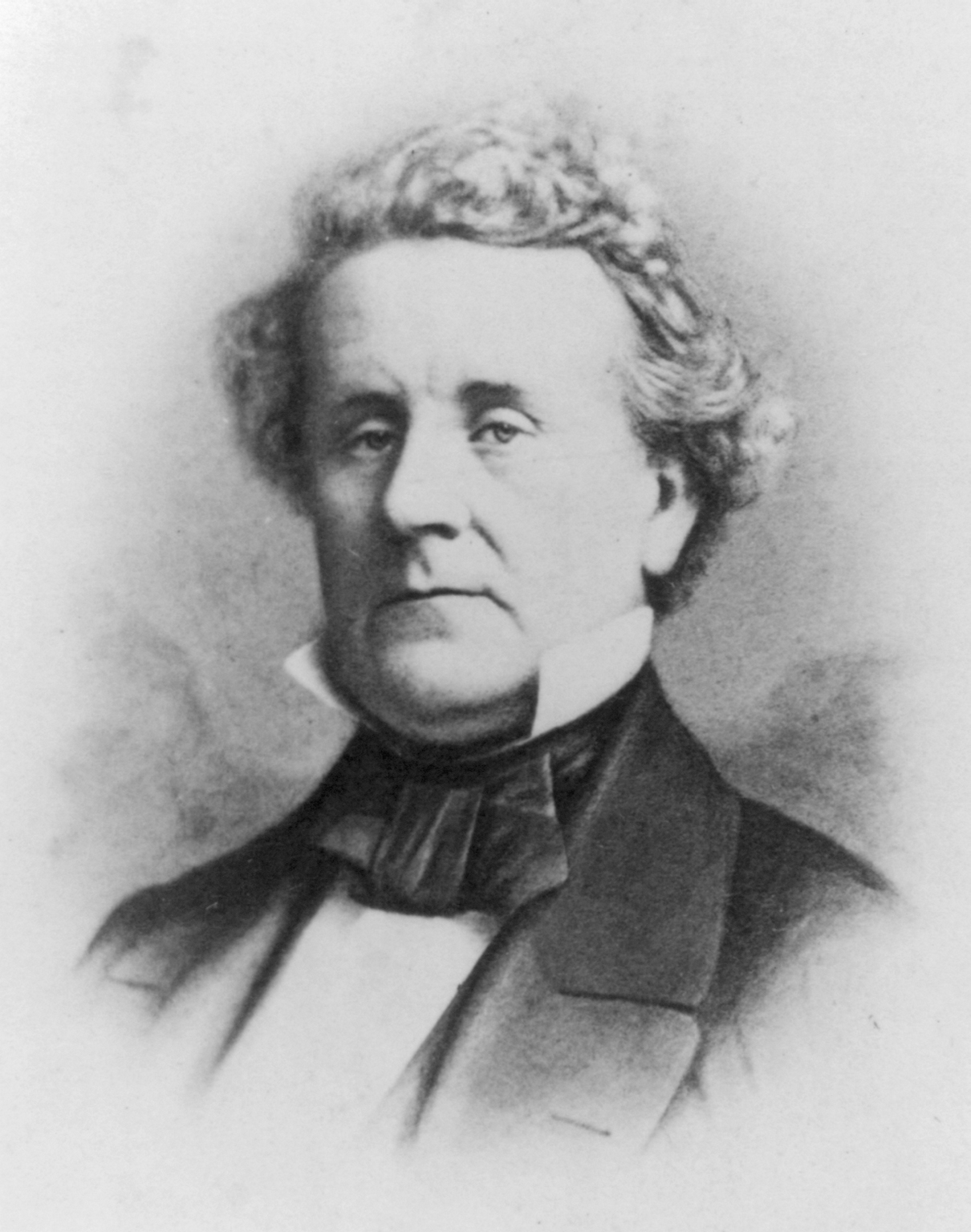

Nominee	Levi Lincoln Jr.	Marcus Morton
Party	National Republican	Democratic
Popular vote	31,875	12,694
Percentage	65.19%	25.96%
- County results Lincoln: 40–50% 60–70% 70–80% 80–90% Morton: 40–50% 50–60% Write-in: 70–80%
Governor before election
Levi Lincoln Jr.
National Republican
Elected Governor
Levi Lincoln Jr.
National Republican

The first 1831 Massachusetts gubernatorial election was held on April 14.

National Republican Governor Levi Lincoln Jr. was re-elected to a seventh term in office over Democrat Marcus Morton. This was the final regular Massachusetts election scheduled for April before the schedule changed to November, where it remains as of 2026. Lincoln was elected to a reduced term of eight months expiring in January, instead of the typical year-long term ending in May.

== General election ==
=== Candidates ===
- Heman Lincoln (Independent Anti-Mason)
- Levi Lincoln Jr., incumbent governor since 1825 (National Republican)
- Marcus Morton, associate justice of the Supreme Judicial Court, former acting governor and nominee since 1828 (Democratic)
- Henry Shaw, former U.S. representative from Lanesborough (Independent Anti-Mason)

=== Campaign ===
Though the newly established Anti-Masonic Party was not strong enough to nominate a governor, Heman Lincoln and Henry Shaw both ran as independents appealing to Anti-Masonic voters.

=== Results ===
The two Anti-Masons carried twenty-eight towns in the central part of the state; Democrats lost ground.

April 1831 Massachusetts gubernatorial election
Party	Candidate	Votes	%	±%
National Republican	Levi Lincoln Jr. (incumbent)	31,875	65.19%	▼0.33
Democratic	Marcus Morton	12,694	25.96%	▼4.65
Write-in		2,120	4.34%	▲0.47
Independent Anti-Mason	Heman Lincoln (write-in)	1,110	2.27%	N/A
Independent Anti-Mason	Henry Shaw	1,096	2.24%	N/A
Total votes		47,173	100.00%	

== See also ==
- 1830–1831 Massachusetts legislature
