= Massachusetts Constitutional Convention of 1820–1821 =

The Massachusetts Constitutional Convention of 1820–1821 met in order to consider amendments to the Constitution of Massachusetts. It resulted in the adoption of the first nine amendments. Several other proposals were rejected.

== Background ==
Modernization and demographic changes put severe strain on the system set up in the 1780 constitution. New England was the epicenter of the American Industrial Revolution, and urbanization in mill towns and coastal ports led to cities several times larger than seen before in Massachusetts. Apportionment of the General Court was one of the biggest issues leading to calls for a convention. Under the old constitution all towns in Massachusetts were entitled to a representative, with the most populous towns entitled to a few extra representatives. The growth of larger urban towns like Boston caused greater dis-proportionality within this system, and the continual increase in the number of towns in the western part of the state meant the legislature had reached a large size. A smaller problem also occurred reapportioning the seats previously sent by Maine, which had been granted statehood in 1820. The convention sought to produce a more proportional legislature while reducing the size of the House and Senate.

== Articles and results ==
The Constitutional Convention presented fourteen articles for the people's consideration:

=== First Article ===
Changed the constitutional support of public worship and appointment of public teachers to include all Christian denominations, not just Protestant. Provided that all church taxes raised in the State may go to the denomination of one's choosing, instead of only to the Congregational Church.

Also provided that no person may be imprisoned or brought to trial without an indictment by a Grand Jury.

To abolish support, by the towns, of protestant ministers and required attendance upon the instructions of the clergy
Choice	Votes	%
For	11,065	36.15
Against	19,547	63.85
Total	30,612	100.00

=== Second Article ===
Moved the start of the political year from the first Wednesday of May to the first Wednesday of January. All elected officials would start their yearly term starting on that date in January. The article also moved the date of the yearly state election to the second Monday of November from the first Monday of April.

To change the political year and date of state election
Choice	Votes	%
For	14,164	45.85
Against	16,728	54.15
Total	30,892	100.00

=== Third Article ===
Provided that if the General Court adjourned before the deadline the Governor had to return a rejected bill, then the law would not be passed.

To forbid bills unsigned after adjournment of General Court to become laws
Choice	Votes	%
For	17,949	62.63
Against	10,709	37.37
Total	28,658	100.00

=== Fourth Article ===
Allowed the state to establish city forms of government for towns over 12,000 inhabitants. It provided for the legislature to draft laws to allow these cities to have different forms of governance than the traditional town meeting.

To empower the legislature to grant city charters.
Choice	Votes	%
For	14,368	50.11
Against	14,306	49.89
Total	28,674	100.00

=== Fifth Article ===
Reduced the number of the Senate from 40 members to 36.

It also changed the apportionment for the House of Representatives. Under the article all towns over 1,200 people would be entitled to one representative, with an additional representative given for every 2,400 residents. All towns under 1,200 residents could choose to either be grouped with a second town to annually elect a representative, or choose to remain separate and elect a representative biennially and only be represented every other year. The article also capped the House's size to 275 members and allowed the legislature to raise the number of residents per representative every 10 years to compensate for population growth.

Provided the House to be paid out from the treasury, and set their quorum to 100 members. All members of the General Court were exempt from arrest when performing their duties as elected officials.

Reduced the number of members of the Governor's Council from nine to seven and set their quorum. It provided that the General Court shall elect them by joint ballot from among the people at large, instead of from the members of the legislature as it had been before.

To Change Method of electing Senators, Representatives, and Councillors
Choice	Votes	%
For	9,904	32.33
Against	20,729	67.67
Total	30,633	100.00

=== Sixth Article ===
Eliminated almost all property and tax restrictions for voting, the exception being paupers. All male citizens over 21 who had resided in the state for one year were entitled to vote.

=== Seventh Article ===
Provided for the gubernatorial appointment of notaries public, the Commissary General, and vacancies for the Secretary and Treasurer.

=== Eighth Article ===
Allowed men serving in the militia, but under the age of 21, to vote for their company Captains and Subalterns the same as men over the age of 21.

=== Ninth Article ===
Amended the process of removing judicial officers, including justices of the peace.

Forbade the Governor and Legislature from soliciting the legal opinion of the Supreme Judicial Court.

=== Tenth Article ===
Allowed the positions reserved for ministers of churches on the Harvard Board of Overseers to be open to all christian denominations. Harvard at the time was publicly funded and prior to this amendment it selected board members from the congregational church.

=== Eleventh Article ===
Amended the oath of allegiance required for all public officials to hold office. It provided an exception for Quakers who refuse to swear oaths.

=== Twelfth Article ===
Specified that no other oath or declaration was required to hold public office except for the one provided for in the eleventh article.

=== Thirteenth Article ===
Forbade state judges from holding any other state office. Forbade anyone holding a state office from holding a federal office other than postmaster.

=== Fourteenth Article ===
Changed the process for amending the Constitution. It required a vote of one-half of Senators and two-thirds of Representatives to vote positively on an amendment in two consecutive sessions. It would then be presented to the voters for approval.

== List of delegates ==
The participants included:

Amherst

- Ebenezer Mattoon

Ashby

- John Locke

Beverly

- Robert Rantoul Jr.

Boston

- John T. Apthorp
- James T. Austin
- Peter Chardon Brooks
- Daniel Davis
- Joseph Coolidge
- John Davis
- Paul Dean
- James Freeman
- William Gray
- Nathan Hale
- Charles Jackson
- Thomas Melvill
- Isaac Parker
- John Phillips
- William Phillips Jr.
- William Prescott Jr.
- Josiah Quincy
- Benjamin Russell
- James Savage
- Lemuel Shaw
- William Sturgis
- Israel Thorndike
- Artemas Ward Jr.
- Henry Ware
- John Collins Warren
- Daniel Webster
- Redford Webster

Brewster

- Elijah Cobb

Chelsea

- Joseph Tuckerman

Concord

- Samuel Hoar

Dedham

- William Ellis
- John Endicott
- James Richardson

Dorchester

- Perez Morton

Dracut

- Samuel Dana
- Joseph Bradley Varnum

Foxborough

- Seth Boyden

Groton

- Luther Lawrence

Haverhill

- Bailey Bartlett

Hingham

- Joseph Richardson

Leominster

- Joseph G. Kendall

Lynn

- Enoch Mudge

Mendon

- Jonathan Russell

Nantucket

- Hezekiah Barnard
- Barker Burnell
- Jethro Mitchell

Pittsfield

- Henry H. Childs

Quincy

- John Adams

Rowley

- Parker Cleaveland

Roxbury

- Henry Alexander Scammell Dearborn
- Sherman Leland
- Ebenezer Seaver

Salem

- Gideon Barstow
- Benjamin Pickman Jr.
- Leverett Saltonstall
- Joseph Story

Saugus

- Jonathan Makepeace

Scituate

- Charles Turner Jr.

Sutton

- Jonas Sibley

Taunton

- James L. Hodges

Uxbridge

- Bezaleel Taft

Worcester

- Edward D. Bangs
- Levi Lincoln Jr.

Yarmouth

- John Reed Jr.

== Works cited ==
- Worthington, Erastus (1896). "Report of the Curators". The Dedham Historical Register. Dedham Historical Society.
