= 1832 Massachusetts gubernatorial election =

- November 12, 1832
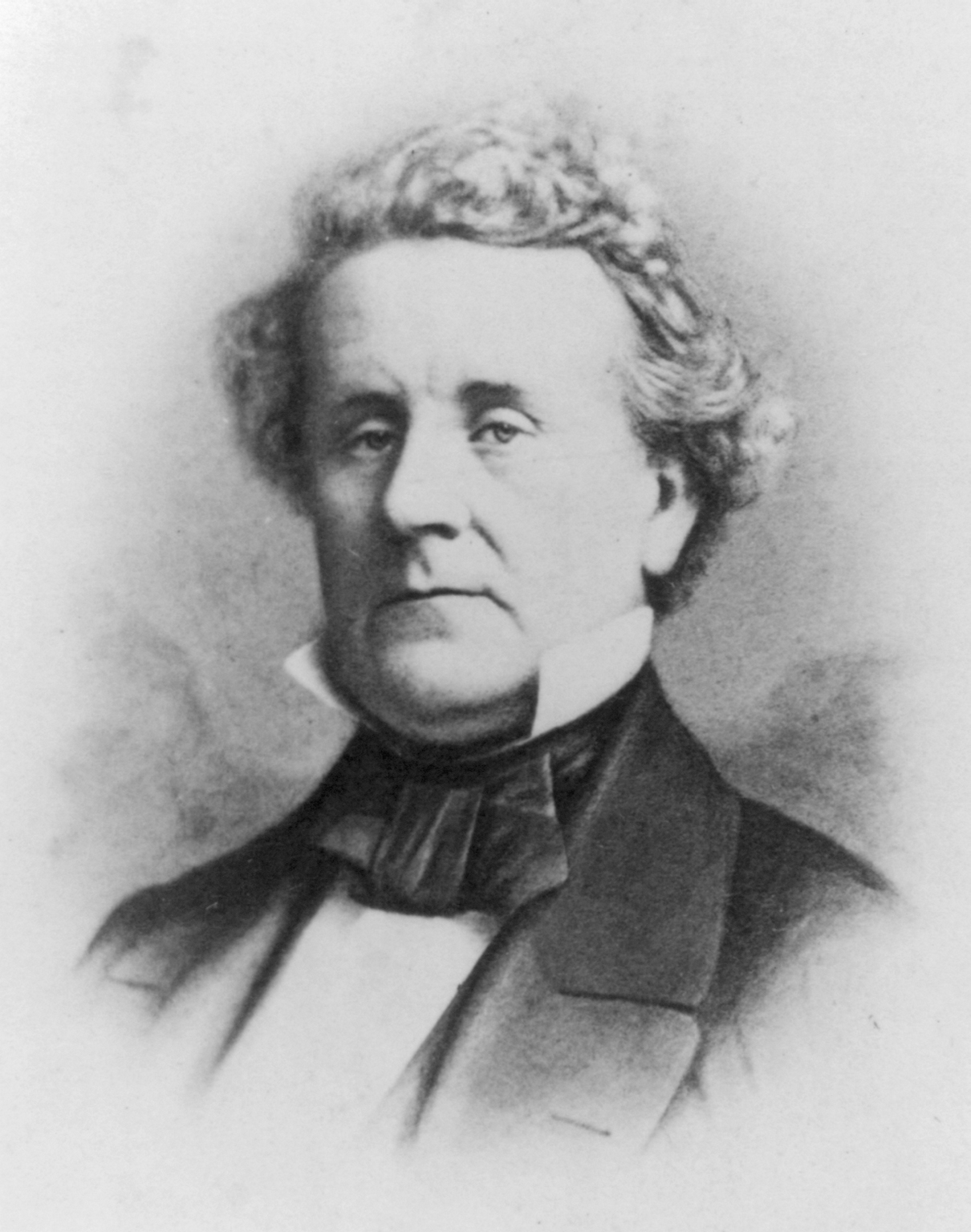

Nominee	Levi Lincoln Jr.	Marcus Morton	Samuel Lathrop
Party	National Republican	Democratic	Anti-Masonic
Popular vote	33,946	15,197	14,755
Percentage	52.86%	23.66%	22.97%
- County results Lincoln: 40–50% 50–60% 60–70% 70–80% >90% Lathrop: 40–50% 50–60%
Governor before election
Levi Lincoln Jr.
National Republican
Elected Governor
Levi Lincoln Jr.
National Republican

The 1832 Massachusetts gubernatorial election was held on November 12.

National Republican Governor Levi Lincoln Jr. was re-elected to a ninth term in office over Democrat Marcus Morton and Anti-Mason Samuel Lathrop.

== General election ==
=== Candidates ===
- Samuel Lathrop, former U.S. representative and state senator from West Springfield (Anti-Masonic)
- Levi Lincoln Jr., incumbent governor since 1825 (National Republican)
- Marcus Morton, associate justice of the Supreme Judicial Court, former acting governor and nominee since 1828 (Democratic)

=== Campaign ===
The Anti-Masonic Party, which was now controlled by former Democrats, was growing in strength. The party positioned itself in opposition to Henry Clay, a Mason and the National Republican presidential candidate, by declaring him "far behind the ordinary standard of morals" with "no virtuous example in his private life." This created a conundrum for Anti-Masonic nominee Samuel Lathrop, a friend of Clay.

Democratic candidate Marcus Morton, who had campaigned actively in the preceding three elections, sought to withdraw his name but was persuaded to stay on the ticket by party leader David Henshaw. Morton accepted his role as the state's advocate for the Andrew Jackson campaign but saw little hope of victory and privately expressed that he had no influence over anyone but his son Marcus Jr.

Jackson's veto of the renewal of the national bank charter and his declaration against concentrated wealth consolidated conservative elements against him and may have buoyed the National Republican vote in the state.

=== Results ===
Lincoln and Henry Clay carried the state with more than twice the vote of their nearest competitor, with the Democrats finishing third in both races. Turnout increased, though this time with most of the new votes going to the National Republicans and Democrats.

1832 Massachusetts gubernatorial election
Party	Candidate	Votes	%	±%
National Republican	Levi Lincoln Jr. (incumbent)	33,946	52.86%	▼1.06
Democratic	Marcus Morton	15,197	23.66%	▲3.11
Anti-Masonic	Samuel Lathrop	14,755	22.97%	▼2.04
Write-in		327	0.51%	▼0.01
Total votes		64,225	100.00%	

== See also ==
- 1832 Massachusetts legislature
