= Zabdiel Sampson =

American politician (1781–1828)

Member of the U.S. House of Representatives from Massachusetts's 8th district
- In office March 4, 1817 – July 26, 1820
- Preceded by: William Baylies
- Succeeded by: Aaron Hobart

Personal details
- Born: August 22, 1781 Plympton, Massachusetts
- Died: July 19, 1828 (aged 46) Plymouth, Massachusetts
- Party: Democratic-Republican
- Spouse: Ruth Lobdell (m. 1804)
- Children: 10
- Parent(s): George Sampson; Hannah Cooper Sampson
- Education: Brown University
- Occupation: Lawyer

Zabdiel Sampson (August 22, 1781 – July 19, 1828) was a U.S. representative from Massachusetts.

== Early life ==
Sampson was born in Plympton, Massachusetts, on August 22, 1781. He was the eldest of nine children born to George Sampson (1755–1826) and Hannah (née Cooper) Sampson (1761–1836), who married in 1780.

His paternal aunt, Hannah Sampson, was married to his maternal uncle, Richard Cooper. His paternal grandfather, and namesake, was Zabdeil Sampson, who died in the Revolutionary War.

As a young man during the American Revolutionary War, he apprenticed as a blacksmith. He later pursued classical studies and graduated from Brown University in Providence, Rhode Island, in 1803.

== Career ==
He studied law, was admitted to the bar in 1806. He first began practicing in Fairhaven, Massachusetts, before returning to practice in Plymouth.

Sampson first became involved in politics as a member of the Board of Selectmen for Plymouth. In 1816, he was elected as a Democratic-Republican to succeed Congressman William Baylies and represent Massachusetts's 8th congressional district in the Fifteenth and Sixteenth Congresses and served from March 4, 1817, to July 26, 1820, when he resigned due to his appointment by President James Monroe as Collector of Customs at Plymouth on July 26, 1820, and served until his death. Sampson was a close friend of Daniel Webster.

== Personal life ==
On October 18, 1804, Sampson was married to Ruth Lobdell (1784–1837), daughter of Captain Ebenezer and Judith Lobdell. Together, they were the parents of ten children, including:

- Milton Lobdell Sampson (1805–1806), who died in infancy.
- Eudora Rowland Sampson (1807–1852), who married Francis Alden.
- Algernon Sidney Sampson (1809–1815), who died as a child.
- Marcia Lobdell Sampson (1811–1859), who married John Hayden Coggeshall. After his death, she married Dr. John Hornby.
- Maria Louisa Sampson (b. 1813), who married Daniel Ricketson in 1834.
- Algernon Sidney Sampson (1815–1849), who married Adeline Lombard.
- Ruth Lobdell Sampson (1819–1851), who married Daniel Hathaway.
- Zabdiel Silsbee Sampson (1821–1870)
- Judith Lobdell Sampson (b. 1827), a twin.
- Nancy Ripley Sampson (1827–1854), a twin who married prolific author James Loring Baker (1813–1886).

Sampson died on July 19, 1828, in Plymouth. He was interred in Burial Hill Cemetery.

U.S. House of Representatives
Preceded by William Baylies	Member of the U.S. House of Representatives from Massachusetts's 8th congressional district March 4, 1817 – July 26, 1820	Succeeded by Aaron Hobart
