= Jethro Mitchell =

American politician

Member of the Massachusetts Senate Nantucket District
- In office 1823–1823
- Preceded by: Barker Burnell
- Succeeded by: Barker Burnell

Member of the Massachusetts House of Representatives Nantucket District
- In office 1821–1821

Member of the Massachusetts Constitutional Convention of 1820
- In office 1820–1820

Jethro Mitchell was an American politician who served as a member of the Massachusetts House of Representatives, the Massachusetts Senate, and in the Massachusetts Constitutional Convention of 1820–1821.

== Political offices ==
Mitchell was a member of the Massachusetts Constitutional Convention of 1820, a member of the Massachusetts House of Representatives in 1821, and a member of the Massachusetts Senate in 1823 .
