= USS Henshaw =

Clemson-class destroyer

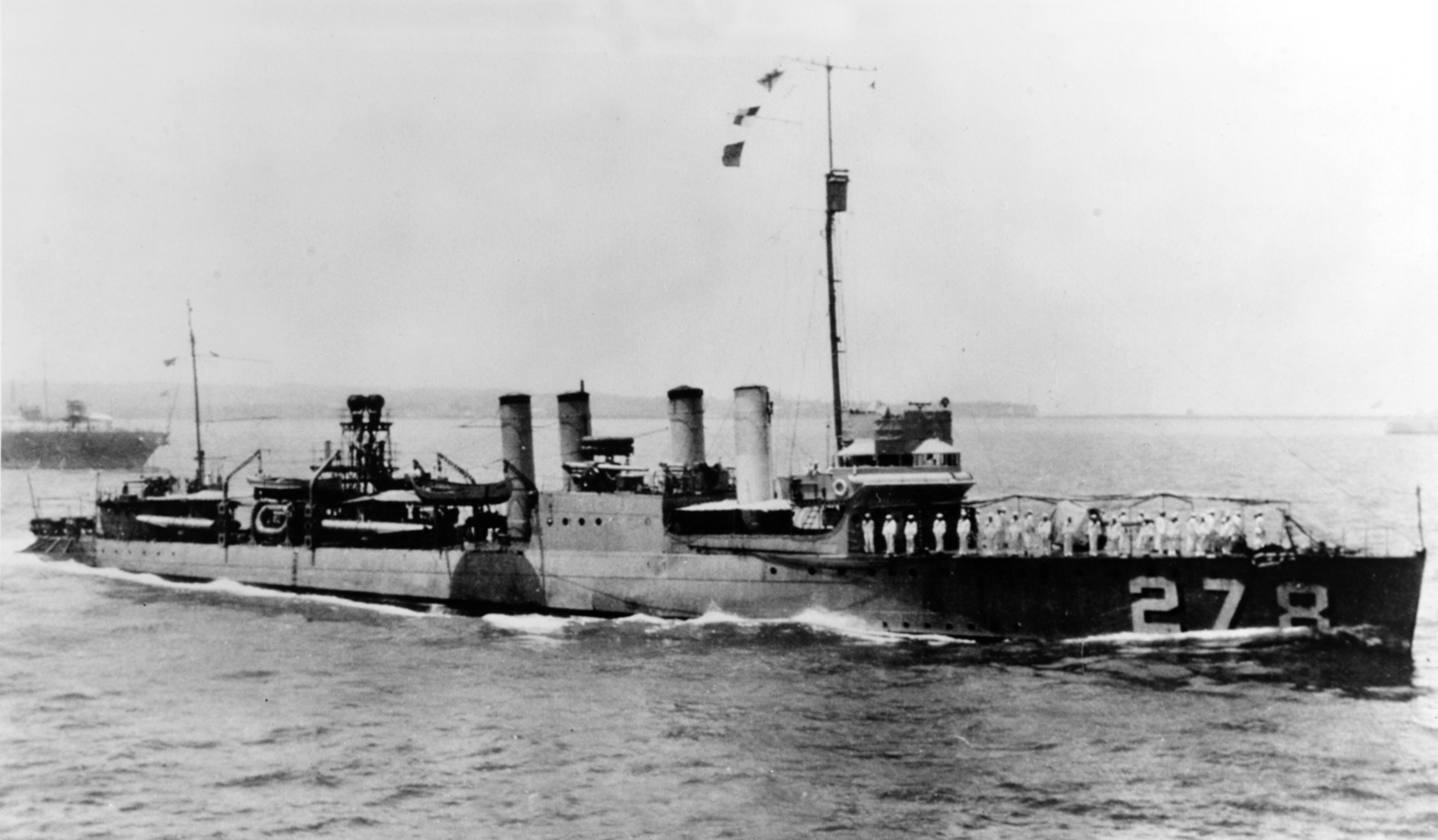

History

United States
- Name: USS Henshaw
- Namesake: David Henshaw
- Builder: Bethlehem Shipbuilding Corporation, Squantum Victory Yard
- Launched: 28 June 1919
- Commissioned: 10 December 1919
- Decommissioned: 11 March 1930
- Stricken: 22 July 1930
- Fate: Sold for scrap, 14 November 1930

General characteristics
- Class & type: Clemson-class destroyer
- Displacement: 1,308 tons
- Length: 314 ft 4 in (95.81 m)
- Beam: 30 ft 11 in (9.42 m)
- Draft: 9 ft 4 in (2.84 m)
- Propulsion: 26,500 shp (20 MW); geared turbines, 2 screws
- Speed: 35 knots (65 km/h)
- Range: 4,900 nm @ 15 kn (9,100 km @ 28 km/h)
- Complement: 122 officers and enlisted
- Armament: 4 × 4 in (100 mm) guns, 1 × 3 in (76 mm) gun, 12 × 21 inch (533 mm) torpedo tubes

USS Henshaw (DD-278) was a Clemson-class destroyer in the United States Navy following World War I. She was named for Secretary of the Navy David Henshaw.

Built by the Bethlehem Shipbuilding Corporation of Squantum, Massachusetts, Henshaw was launched 28 June 1919, with Miss Ethel H. Dempsey as sponsor. She commissioned at Boston, Massachusetts, on 10 December 1919.

== Service history ==
The new destroyer sailed to Newport, Rhode Island, for torpedoes and ammunition and from there left for the Caribbean, arriving at Guantanamo 9 February 1920. From 24 February until 4 March Henshaw was part of the Navy fleet standing off Port Cortes, Honduras, to protect American lives and interests in case of a revolution taking place in Guatemala. Once it was clear that a revolution was not going to occur, she sailed for the West Coast, joining the destroyer squadron, Pacific Fleet, at San Diego, California, on 1 April. Her first duty was to escort the Prince of Wales, later Edward VIII, in Renown into and out of San Diego on 7–8 April.

After exercises with the fleet off the California coast, Henshaw sailed to Seattle, Washington, where on 10 July she joined the cruise of Josephus Daniels, Secretary of the Navy, Admiral Hugh Rodman, Commander of the Pacific Fleet, and John B. Payne, Secretary of the Interior. While inspecting Alaskan coal and oil fields, and looking for possible fleet anchorages, the cruise touched at nine northern ports, including Ketchikan, Sitka, Dundas Bay, and Juneau, before Henshaw returned to San Diego on 17 August. During the cruise she had been visited by all the dignitaries involved, and had transported Thomas Riggs Jr., Governor of the territory of Alaska, and his party, from Sitka to Juneau. Training and battle exercises along the California coast and an occasional run to Puget Sound with passengers occupied Henshaw until 15 June 1922, when she decommissioned at San Diego.

Recommissioning there on 27 September 1923 Henshaw again served with the destroyer squadron, Pacific Fleet. Her itinerary for 1924 typifies her activities for the next 6 years; departing San Diego on 2 January, she transited the Panama Canal and engaged in tactical maneuvers with the combined fleets in the Caribbean, returning to San Diego on 24 April. After overhaul at Bremerton, Washington, she returned to California for further exercises and training. In 1925 this routine was slightly varied, as the fleet exercises took place off Pearl Harbor and Lahaina Roads, Hawaii.

Henshaw decommissioned at San Diego on 11 March 1930. Her name was stricken 22 July 1930 and she was sold for scrapping on 14 November 1930.
