= 1824 Massachusetts gubernatorial election =

- April 5, 1824
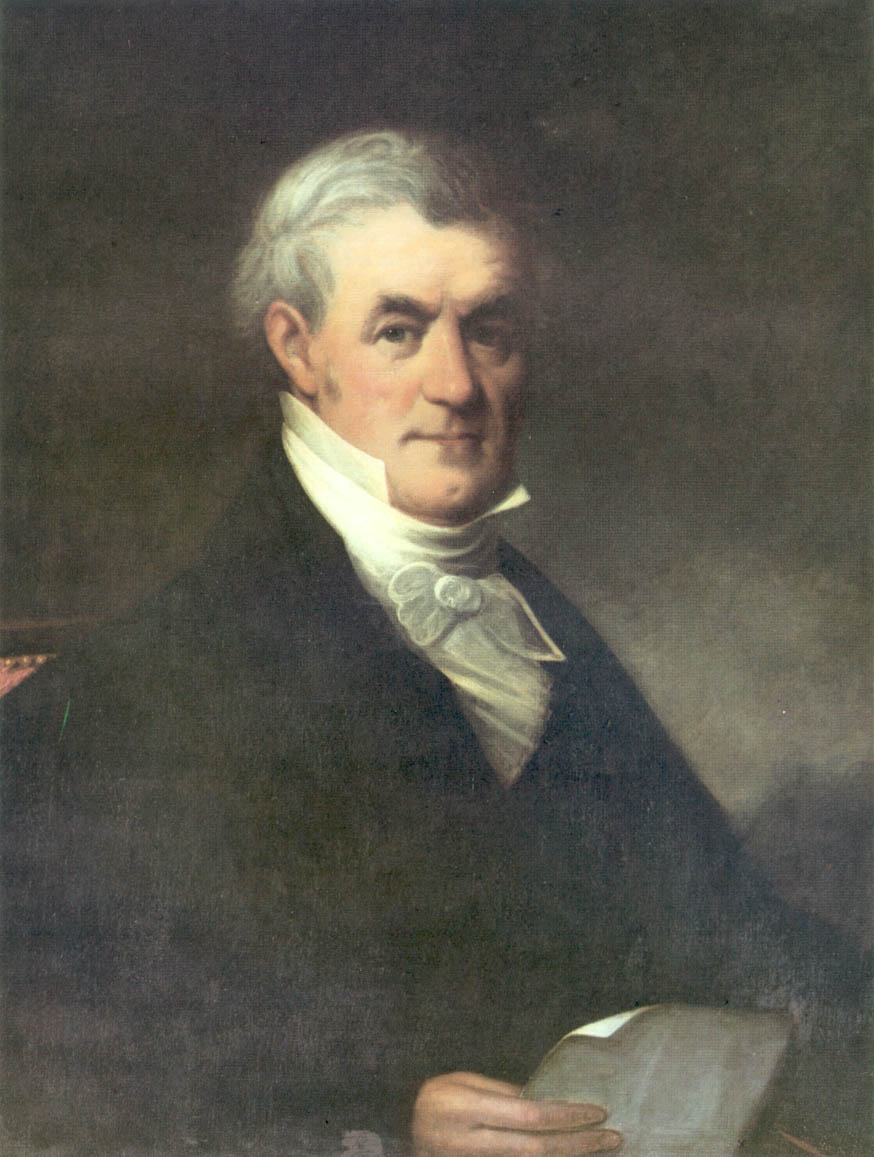

Nominee	William Eustis	Samuel Lathrop
Party	Democratic-Republican	Federalist
Popular vote	38,650	34,210
Percentage	52.91%	46.83%
- County results Eustis: 50–60% 60–70% 70–80% Lathrop: 50–60% 60–70%
Governor before election
William Eustis
Democratic-Republican
Elected Governor
William Eustis
Democratic-Republican

The 1824 Massachusetts gubernatorial election was held on April 5.

Democratic-Republican Governor William Eustis was re-elected to a second term in office over U.S. Representative Samuel Lathrop, a Federalist ally of John Quincy Adams. This was the last election in which the dying Federalist Party, which had already collapsed at the national level, was competitive.

== General election ==
=== Candidates ===
- Samuel Lathrop, U.S. representative from West Springfield (Adams Federalist)
- William Eustis, incumbent governor since 1823 and former U.S. secretary of war (Republican)

=== Results ===
1824 Massachusetts gubernatorial election
Party	Candidate	Votes	%	±%
Democratic-Republican	William Eustis (incumbent)	38,650	52.91%	▲0.25
Federalist	Samuel Lathrop	34,210	46.83%	▲0.65
Write-in		191	0.26%	▼0.90
Total votes		73,051	100.00%	
