= 1826 Massachusetts gubernatorial election =

- April 3, 1826
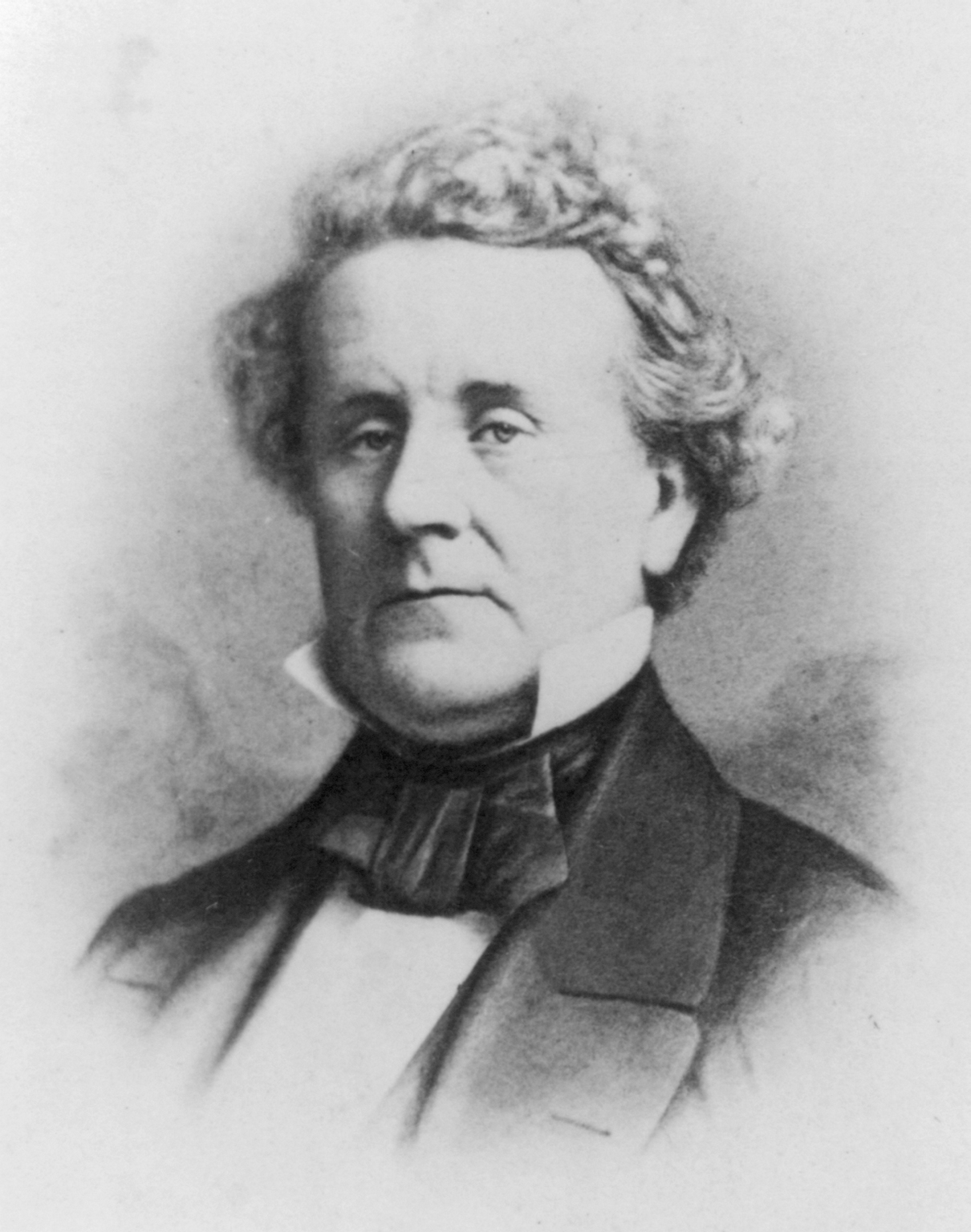

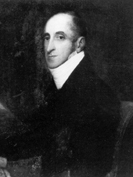
Nominee	Levi Lincoln Jr.	Samuel Hubbard	James Lloyd
Party	Democratic-Republican	Federalist	Federalist
Popular vote	27,884	9,044	2,211
Percentage	68.04%	22.07%	5.40%
- County results Lincoln: 40–50% 60–70% 70–80% 80–90% >90% Hubbard: 50–60%
Governor before election
Levi Lincoln Jr.
Democratic-Republican
Elected Governor
Levi Lincoln Jr.
Democratic-Republican

The 1826 Massachusetts gubernatorial election was held on April 3.

Governor Levi Lincoln Jr., an Adams Republican, was re-elected to a second term over fractured opposition from the state's Federalists. This was the last election in which candidates stood as Federalists, as the party had been on the verge of collapse for years. The state soon coalesced into a dominant Adams Republican faction with a minority Jacksonian Republican group.

== General election ==
=== Candidates ===
- Levi Lincoln Jr., incumbent governor since 1825 (Adams Republican)
- James Lloyd, U.S. senator since 1822 (Federalist)
- Samuel Hubbard (Federalist)
- William Sullivan (Federalist)

=== Results ===
1826 Massachusetts gubernatorial election
Party	Candidate	Votes	%	±%
Democratic-Republican	Levi Lincoln Jr. (incumbent)	27,884	68.04%	▼26.07
Federalist	Samuel Hubbard	7,130	22.07%	N/A
Federalist	James Lloyd	2,211	5.40%	N/A
Write-in		1,405	3.43%	▼2.46
Federalist	William Sullivan	441	1.08%	N/A
Total votes		40,985	100.00%	
