= 1825 Massachusetts gubernatorial election =

1825 election in Massachusetts, United States

- April 4, 1825
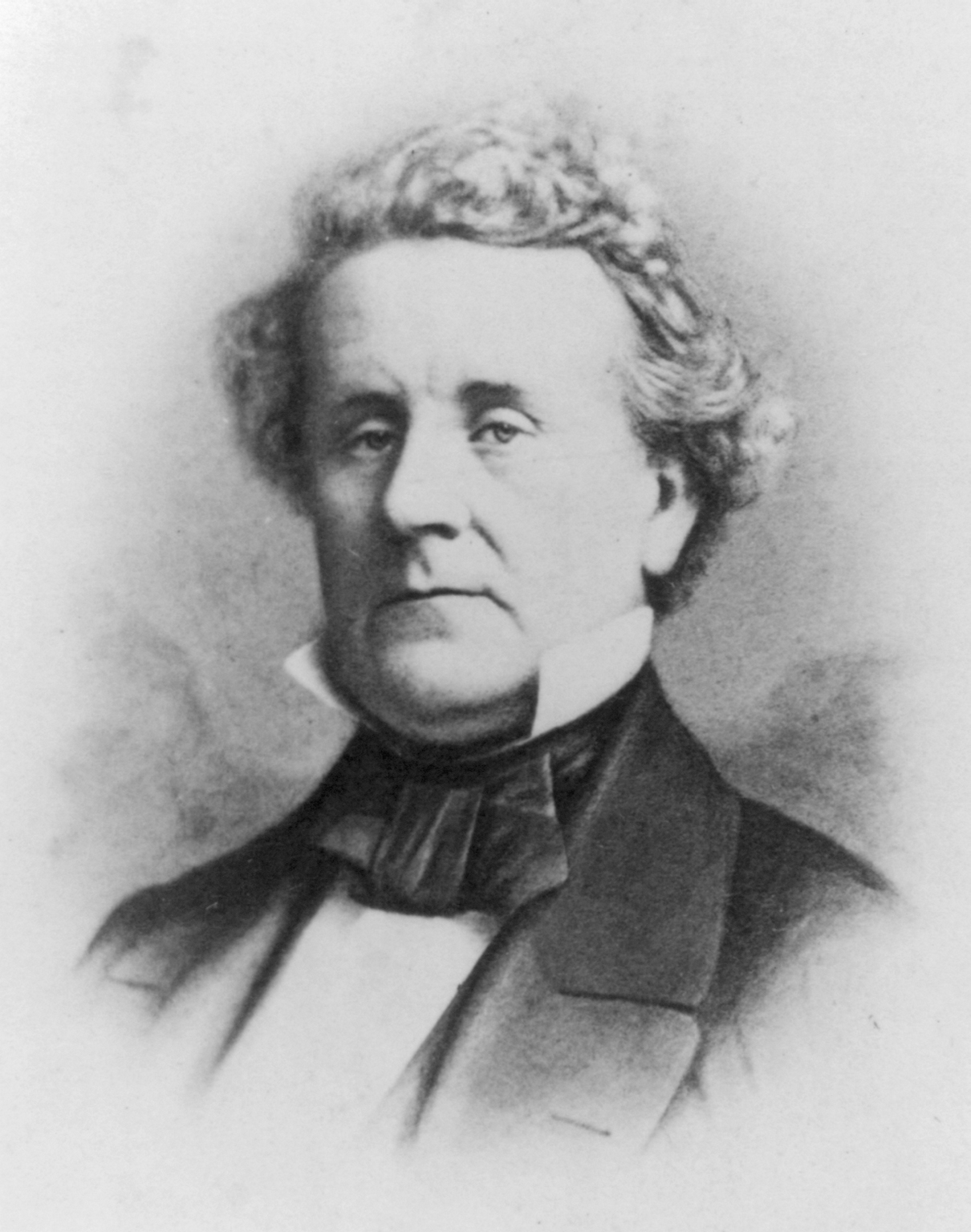
Nominee	Levi Lincoln Jr.
Party	Democratic-Republican
Popular vote	35,221
Percentage	94.11%
- County results Lincoln: 80–90% >90%
Governor before election
Marcus Morton (acting)
Democratic-Republican
Elected Governor
Levi Lincoln Jr.
Democratic-Republican

The 1825 Massachusetts gubernatorial election was held on April 4.

Governor William Eustis died in February, leaving Lieutenant Governor Marcus Morton, a Jacksonian Republican, to fill the seat on an acting basis.

In the general election, Levi Lincoln Jr., an Adams Republican, had no organized opposition.

== General election ==
=== Candidates ===
- Levi Lincoln Jr., associate justice of the Massachusetts Supreme Judicial Court (Adams Republican)

=== Results ===
1825 Massachusetts gubernatorial election
Party	Candidate	Votes	%	±%
Democratic-Republican	Levi Lincoln Jr.	35,221	94.11%	N/A
Write-in		2,205	5.89%	▲5.63
Total votes		37,426	100.00%	
