= Joseph Richardson (American politician) =

American politician (1778–1871)

Member of the U.S. House of Representatives from Massachusetts's 11th district
- In office March 4, 1827 – March 3, 1831
- Preceded by: Aaron Hobart
- Succeeded by: John Quincy Adams

Member of the Massachusetts Senate
- In office 1823–1824
- In office 1826

Member of the Massachusetts House of Representatives
- In office 1821–1822

Personal details
- Born: February 1, 1778 Billerica, Massachusetts, U.S.
- Died: September 25, 1871 (aged 93) Hingham, Massachusetts, U.S.
- Resting place: Old Ship Cemetery
- Party: Anti-Jacksonian
- Education: Dartmouth College

Joseph Richardson (February 1, 1778 – September 25, 1871) was a U.S. representative from Massachusetts.

Born in Billerica, Massachusetts, Richardson attended public and private schools. He graduated from Dartmouth College, Hanover, New Hampshire, in 1802. He was a teacher in Charlestown 1804-1806. He studied theology and was ordained a minister and assigned to the first parish of the Unitarian Church in Hingham on July 2, 1806. He served as delegate to the Massachusetts Constitutional Convention of 1820–1821. He served as member of the state house of representatives in 1821 and 1822. He served in the state senate in 1823, 1824, and 1826.

Richardson was elected as an Adams candidate to the Twentieth Congress and reelected as an Anti-Jacksonian to the Twenty-first Congresses (March 4, 1827 – March 3, 1831). He declined to be a candidate for renomination in 1830 to the Twenty-second Congress.

He resumed his ministerial duties, and died in Hingham, Massachusetts, on September 25, 1871. He was interred in Old Ship Cemetery.

== See also ==
- Politics of the United States

U.S. House of Representatives
Preceded by Aaron Hobart	Member of the U.S. House of Representatives from Massachusetts's 11th congressional district March 4, 1827 - March 3, 1831	Succeeded by John Quincy Adams
