= William Jarvis (merchant) =

American diplomat

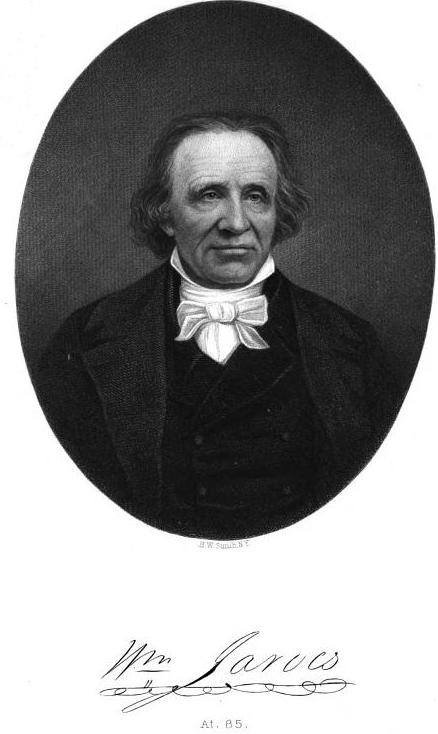
William Jarvis

William Jarvis (1770–1859) was an American diplomat, financier and philanthropist best known for introducing the merino breed of sheep into the United States from the Iberian Peninsula.

== Biography ==
=== Early life, education and career ===
Born in Boston to a Boston Brahmin family, William Jarvis was the son of Charles Jarvis, a Boston medical doctor who owned the former Governor William Shirley house on today's State Street. His son William watched the elder Jarvis, an ardent patriot, deliver addresses during the Revolutionary era, and later recalled hearing Boston Sheriff Handerson read the Declaration of Independence from the balcony of the Old State House.

Jarvis was sent to schools in Boston, Philadelphia and New Jersey, and completed his mercantile training in a Norfolk, Virginia, counting house. He returned to Boston and entered into business. Jarvis guaranteed the debt of a New York City mercantile house belonging to a friend and business associate, which obligation the friend defaulted on. Jarvis paid off the liabilities, but it entailed selling many of his own assets. To recoup his fortune, he bought a clipper ship and moved to Europe, where he dealt widely across the continent in commodities and built a successful trading house, William Jarvis & Co.

=== Success in wool trade ===
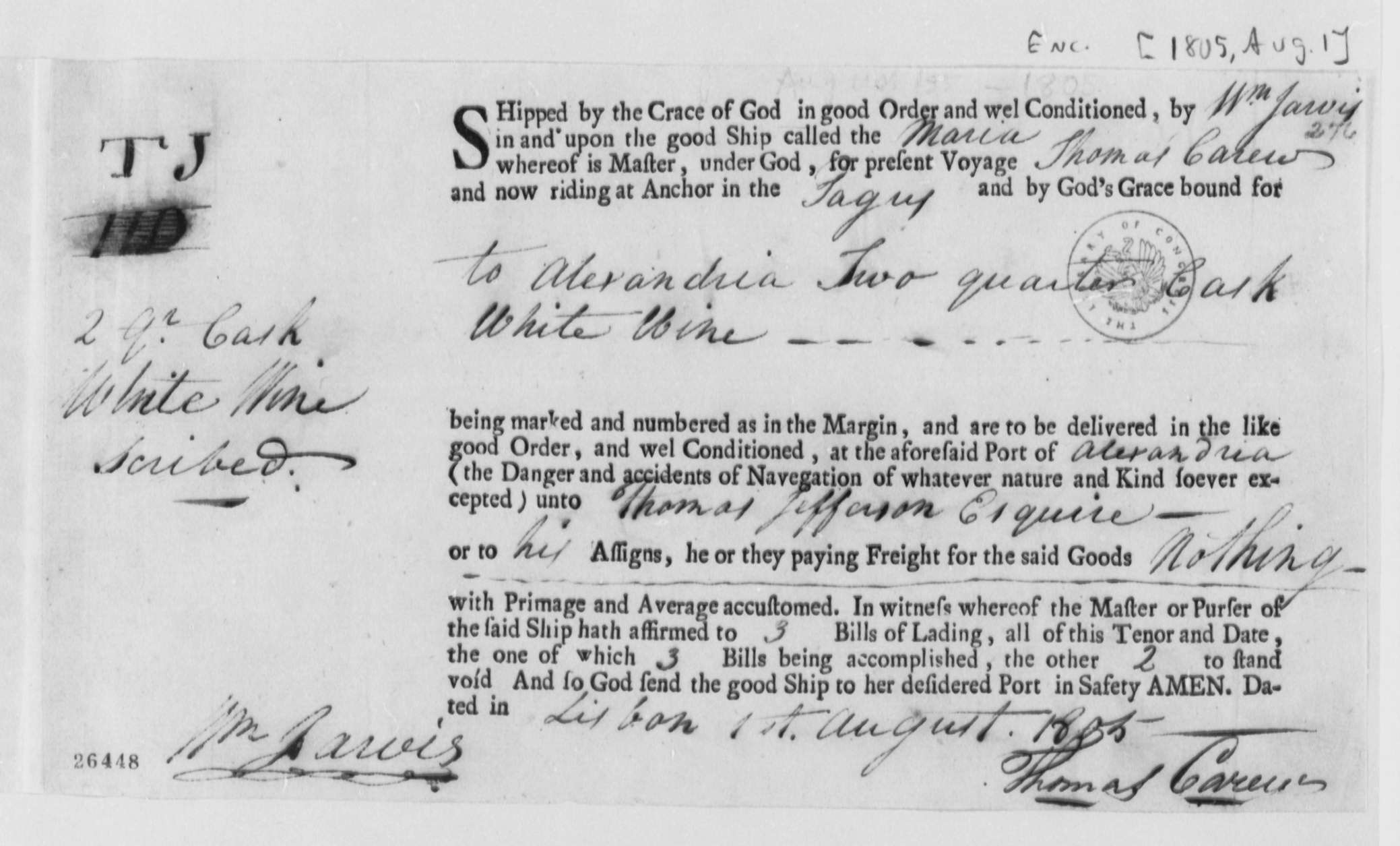
Bill of lading for wine sent from U.S. Consul Jarvis to Thomas Jefferson, 1805

Jarvis was appointed by President Thomas Jefferson as the United States consul in Lisbon, serving in the post for a decade. Before returning to the United States, Jarvis purchased a flock of some 4,000 Merino sheep and smuggled them out of Spain. His intention was to take advantage of Napoleon's conquest and break the Spanish stranglehold on the valuable Merino wool market. Fine merino wool was highly prized for its unique water-shedding qualities and longer fiber.

On returning to America, Jarvis gave eight merino sheep to Jefferson. He made an additional gift to sitting President James Madison as well. Jarvis sold some of his new merino sheep, but kept most of them at his newly purchased estate in Weathersfield, Vermont, where he had secured the services of a Spanish shepherd to tend them. Jarvis became a 'merino zealot,' speaking to audiences around America and extolling the virtues of the newly imported breed. He employed up to 20 seasonal workers at his Weathersfield Bow compound, census data show, to handle the labor-intensive tasks associated with wool production and sheep raising. Eventually Jarvis had the sheep bred and sold nationwide. He also employed a network of merchants in Europe and America who assisted him in selling his wool across America and the continent. In addition, he funneled some into a textile mill he partially owned in Quechee, Vermont.

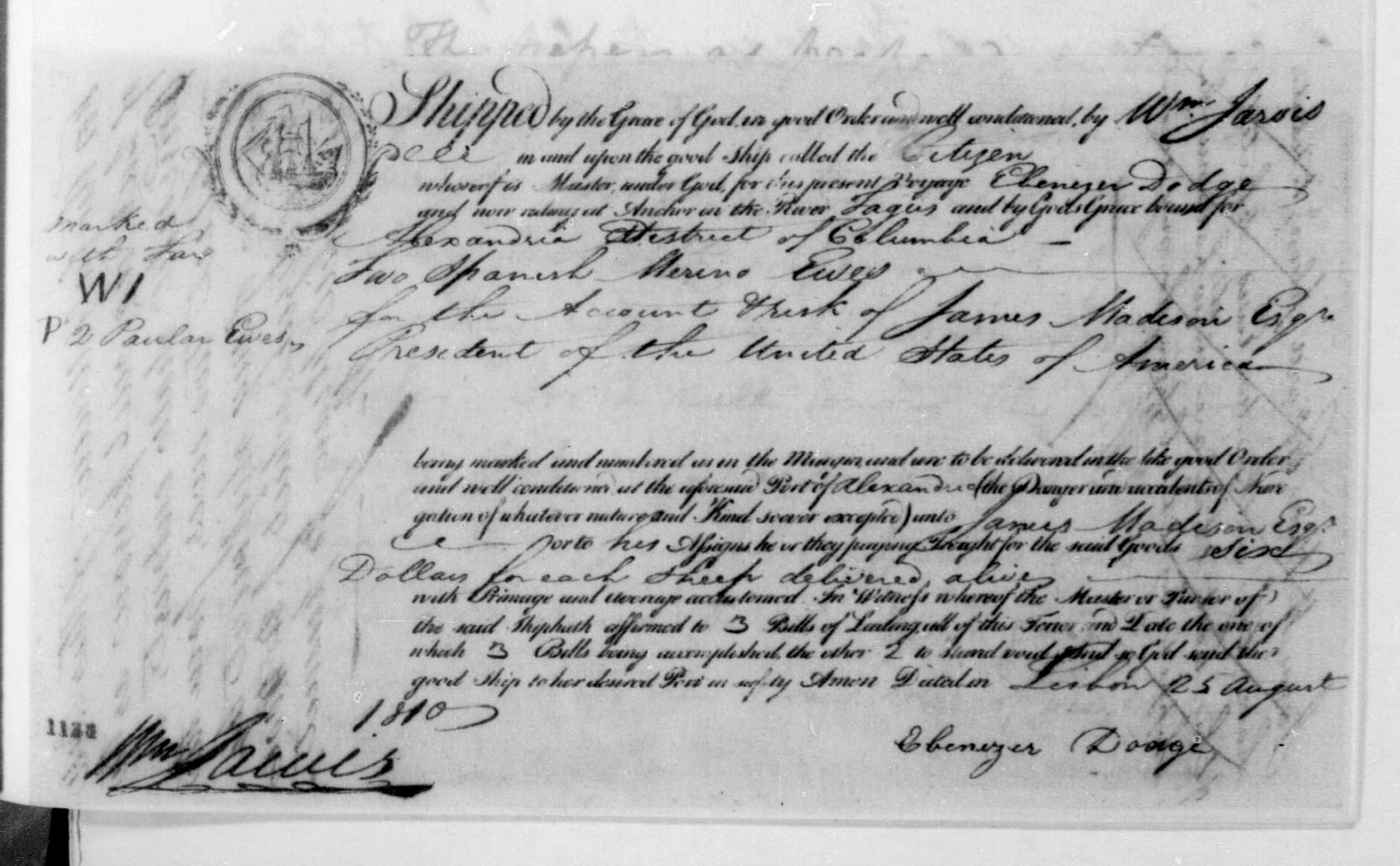
Bill of lading for two Spanish merino ewes, sent by Jarvis to President James Madison, 1810

Jarvis' strategy yielded prodigious returns for several decades, especially following the blockade during the War of 1812, when prohibitions on British wool sent demand for domestic wool soaring. "Merino mania" gripped the state of Vermont. Farmers clamored for the newly imported breed; sheep-raising increased significantly across the East Coast. Prices rose for the fine merino wool with its unique water-shedding qualities and longer fiber.

Vermont became the toast of the nation's agricultural community. By 1830 merino sheep had become the state's principal livestock. Prior to the introduction of the merino, New England farmers had two breeds of sheep from which to choose, neither noted for the quality of its fleece. In 1812, the average fleece of a Vermont sheep was only six percent of the animal's weight. By 1844, that figure had more than doubled to 15 percent; by 1865 it had risen to 21 percent.

By 1837, over one million sheep were being raised in Vermont. But the industry was held captive to the nation's evolving tariff laws, alternately shielding and then exposing domestic producers to cutthroat foreign competition. Jarvis himself spent tens of thousands of dollars on pamphlets arguing the case for tariffs and trying to persuade legislators, including Henry Clay, into supporting them.

The price of a pound of wool dropped from 57 cents in 1835 to 25 cents in the late 1840s. Vermont producers, who were among the highest-cost producers in America, given the state's small farms and rocky land, were squeezed hard. Many farmers went out of business, and others had to scramble to keep their farms and not go hungry. Today the small village of Weathersfield, once the envy of its day with its fine old stone church, bears mute testimony to the glory days of "merino mania".

=== Family ===
In 1808, he married Mary Pepperell Sparhawk of Boston, a fellow descendant of Sir William Pepperell of Massachusetts. (This was a first cousin marriage: Jarvis' wife was the niece of his mother, the former Mary Pepperell Sparhawk Jarvis.) Mary Sparhawk bore him two children before her death in 1811. Six years later, he married Anna Bailey Bartlett, the daughter of Bailey Bartlett of Haverhill, Massachusetts, a member of the convention that drafted the U.S. Constitution, a Presidential Elector, a High Sheriff of Essex County (to which post he was appointed by John Hancock) as well as State Senator and County Treasurer. William Jarvis and the former Anna Bartlett had ten children.

=== Death and legacy ===
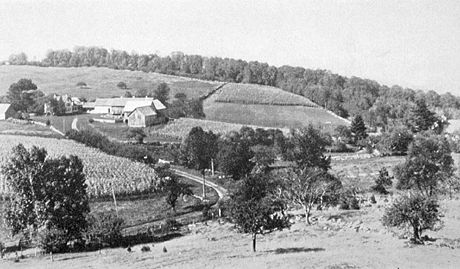
View of Weathersfield, Vermont, early 1900s

William Jarvis died in 1859. Earlier, in 1813, Jarvis had deeded land in Weathersfield to the local school district with the proviso that the Jarvis family could use some portion of the land as their family burial ground in perpetuity. Consul Jarvis was laid to rest in that burying ground in Weathersfield, near his home in Weathersfield Bow in 1859. Other family members, including his son Major Charles Jarvis, lie interred beside him today.

The epitaph on his gravestone reads: "William Jarvis, son of Dr. Charles Jarvis born in Boston 4 February 1770 died 21 October 1859. He was consul for Lisbon and acting Charge d'affairs of the United States for Portugal from 1802 to 1811. To have served nine years in a difficult situation, under such able and patriotic presidents as Thomas Jefferson and James Madison is alone a sufficient eulogy on his fidelity and capacity. He was the first large importer from Spain and distributor throughout the Union of that useful animal, the Merino sheep, which greatly contributed to lay the foundation of the woolen manufactures of this country. His early life was checkered by the vicissitudes of fortune but by industry, perseverance, intelligence and good faith, he made himself independent, and spent his latter years in tranquil retirement amidst a numerous family; his last aspiration of affection being gratified by laying his bones in peace amidst those whom he loved in life." On Jarvis's tombstone is carved a merino sheep in bas relief.

The lasting legacy of William Jarvis may be the landscape he left behind. Before the advent of merino, much of Vermont was fenced with timber. The merino boom gave Vermont farmers a purpose for all those rock cairns dotting the hills they had struggled to till. Farmers hard-pressed to find enough timber for fencing turned to stone, constructing walls that are now iconic to today's Vermont landscape.

== See also ==
- Leavitt Hunt
