= Aaron Hobart =

American politician (1787–1858)

Member of the U.S. House of Representatives from Massachusetts
- In office November 24, 1820 – March 3, 1827
- Preceded by: Zabdiel Sampson
- Succeeded by: Joseph Richardson
- Constituency: 8th district (1820–23); 11th district (1823–27)

Member of the Massachusetts Senate
- In office 1819

Member of the Massachusetts House of Representatives
- In office 1814

Personal details
- Born: June 26, 1787 Abington, Massachusetts
- Died: September 19, 1858 (aged 71) East Bridgewater, Massachusetts, US
- Party: Democratic-Republican; National Republican
- Parents: Aaron Hobart (father); Susanna Adams (mother)
- Education: Brown University
- Profession: Lawyer

Aaron Hobart (June 26, 1787 – September 19, 1858) was a U.S. representative from Massachusetts. Born in Abington, Massachusetts, Hobart pursued classical studies and graduated from Brown University in 1805. He studied law, was admitted to the bar and commenced practice in Abington. He served as member of the Massachusetts House of Representatives and served in the Massachusetts State Senate.

Hobart was elected as a Democratic-Republican to the Sixteenth Congress to fill the vacancy caused by the resignation of Zabdiel Sampson. He was reelected as a Democratic-Republican to the Seventeenth Congress, elected as an Adams-Clay Republican to the Eighteenth Congress, and reelected as an Adams candidate to the Nineteenth Congress, and served from November 24, 1820, to March 3, 1827.

Hobart declined to be a candidate for renomination in 1826. He then served as an Executive councilor 1827-1831 and served as probate judge 1843-1858. He unsuccessfully ran as the Democratic Party nominee in the third vote of the 1853–54 Boston mayoral election.

Hobart died in East Bridgewater, Massachusetts, September 19, 1858, and was interred in Central Cemetery.

U.S. House of Representatives
Preceded by Zabdiel Sampson	Member of the U.S. House of Representatives from Massachusetts's 8th congressional district November 24, 1820 – March 3, 1823	Succeeded by Samuel Lathrop
