= Samuel Lathrop =

American politician (1772–1846)

Member of the U.S. House of Representatives from Massachusetts
- In office March 4, 1819 – March 3, 1827
- Preceded by: Elijah H. Mills
- Succeeded by: Isaac C. Bates
- Constituency: 5th district (1819–23); 8th district (1823–27)

Member of the Massachusetts Senate
- In office May 1828 – May 1831

Personal details
- Born: May 1, 1772 Springfield, Province of Massachusetts Bay, British America (now West Springfield)
- Died: July 11, 1846 (aged 74) West Springfield, Massachusetts, U.S.
- Party: Federalist
- Education: Yale College
- Occupation: Attorney

Samuel Lathrop (May 1, 1772 – July 11, 1846) was a U.S. representative from Massachusetts.

== Biography ==
Samuel Lathrop was born on May 1, 1772, on the western side of Springfield (which would later be incorporated as a separate town in 1774) in the Province of Massachusetts Bay. He was the son of Reverend Joseph Lathrop, longtime pastor of the First Church of West Springfield. He pursued classical studies and graduated from Yale College in 1792.

He studied law, was admitted to the bar, and commenced practice in West Springfield. Lathrop served as West Springfield's clerk and treasurer from 1796 to 1798, and was town meeting moderator eight years. From 1817 to 1821, he served as Hampden County Attorney.

Lathrop was elected as a Federalist to the Sixteenth and Seventeenth Congresses, reelected as an Adams-Clay Federalist to the Eighteenth Congress, and reelected as an Adams candidate to the Nineteenth Congress (March 4, 1819 – March 3, 1827). He served as chairman of the Committee on Revisal and Unfinished Business (Seventeenth and Eighteenth Congresses). In 1824, Lathrop ran unsuccessfully for Governor of Massachusetts, losing to Levi Lincoln Jr. Lathrop was the last Federalist nominee for Massachusetts governor.

After leaving Congress Lathrop resumed the practice of law and became a gentleman farmer. He served as member of the Massachusetts State Senate in 1829 and 1830 and served as President pro tempore. In 1831 and 1832, he ran unsuccessfully for governor as an Anti-Mason, losing both times to Lincoln. From 1829 to 1840, he was a trustee of Amherst College.

== Death and burial ==
Lathrop died in West Springfield on July 11, 1846. He was interred in the Park Street Cemetery.

== Family ==
In 1797, Lathrop married Mary McCracken, and they were the parents of four sons and six daughters.

Party political offices
Preceded by Harrison Gray Otis	Federalist nominee for Governor of Massachusetts; 1824	Succeeded by None
Preceded by Heman Lincoln	Anti-Masonic nominee for Governor of Massachusetts; 1831, 1832	Succeeded by John Quincy Adams
U.S. House of Representatives
Preceded by Elijah H. Mills	Member of the U.S. House of Representatives from Massachusetts's 5th congressional district March 4, 1819 – March 3, 1823	Succeeded by Jonas Sibley
Preceded by Aaron Hobart	Member of the U.S. House of Representatives from Massachusetts's 8th congressional district March 4, 1823 – March 3, 1827	Succeeded by Isaac C. Bates
Political offices
Preceded by Sherman Leland	16th President of the Massachusetts Senate; 1829-1830	Succeeded by James Fowler
