= James Fowler (Massachusetts politician) =

American politician (1789–1873)

Personal details
- Born: January 4, 1789 Westfield, Massachusetts
- Died: October 18, 1873 (aged 84) Westfield, Massachusetts, U.S.
- Party: Democratic; Free Soil
- Spouse(s): Lucy L. Douglas (m. 1820; died 1840) Charlotte Whitney (m. 1841)
- Relations: Henry W. Dwight (brother-in-law)
- Children: 7
- Education: Yale College; Litchfield Law School
- Occupation: Politician; farmer

James Fowler (January 4, 1789 – October 18, 1873) was an American politician from Massachusetts.

== Early life ==
James Fowler was born on January 4, 1789, in Westfield, Massachusetts, to Jemima (née Lyman) and Samuel Fowler. He was descended from Ambrose Fowler who came to Westfield in 1671. His father was the namesake of Fowler Township in Ohio. Fowler graduated from Yale College in 1807. He studied law at Litchfield Law School.

== Career ==
Following his education, Fowler did not actively pursue law and instead farmed in Westfield. He imported trees from England for his farm.

Fowler was a Democrat. From 1820 to 1830, he served in both the Massachusetts House of Representatives and the Massachusetts Senate. He was defeated by Samuel Lathrop for president of the Massachusetts Senate in 1830. He was a member of the Massachusetts Governor's Council for two years. He was a candidate for the U.S. Congress and ran as the Free Soil Party candidate for lieutenant governor of Massachusetts. He was commissioner to qualify civil officers for close to 50 years and was town postmaster.

Fowler gave land in Westfield for the state normal school and gave land for the town's public park. He opened and ran an evening school with his wife in Westfield. He was trustee of Westfield Academy and was the first president of Hampden Bank. He was a trustee of Amherst College from 1826 to 1838.

== Personal life ==
Fowler married Lucy L. Douglas, daughter of Major T. J. Douglas, of Westfield on February 9, 1820. They had seven children, including Lucy D. and Samuel. She died in 1840. He married Charlotte Whitney, daughter of Captain Silas Whitney, of Stockbridge on October 6, 1841. His sister Fannie married congressman Henry W. Dwight. Another sister married judge Joseph Lyman and his nephew of that marriage was judge Samuel Lyman.

Fowler died on October 18, 1873, in Westfield.
