= Sherman Leland =

American politician

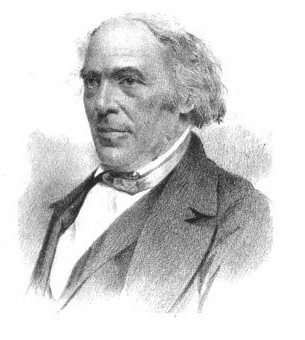

President of the Massachusetts Senate
- In office 1828–1829
- Preceded by: John Mills
- Succeeded by: Samuel Lathrop

Member of the Massachusetts Senate Norfolk County District
- In office 1828–1829

Member of the Massachusetts Senate Norfolk County District
- In office 1823–1824

Member of the Massachusetts Constitutional Convention of 1820
- In office 1820–1820

Member of the Massachusetts House of Representatives Norfolk County District
- In office 1818–1821

Member of the Massachusetts House of Representatives Washington County District
- In office 1812–1812

Personal details
- Born: March 29, 1783 Grafton, Massachusetts
- Died: November 19, 1853 (aged 70) Suffolk, Massachusetts, United States
- Spouse: Elizabeth Adams
- Children: Edwin S. Leland
- Profession: Lawyer

Sherman Leland (March 29, 1783 – November 19, 1853) was a Massachusetts lawyer who served in the Massachusetts House of Representatives, and as a member, and President of, the Massachusetts Senate. During the War of 1812, he served in a regiment of U.S. Volunteers, and subsequently the 34th U.S. Infantry, at Eastport, Maine.

== Notes ==
Political offices
| Preceded by John Mills | President of the Massachusetts Senate; 1828-1829 | Succeeded by Samuel Lathrop |
