= David Henshaw (American politician) =

American politician

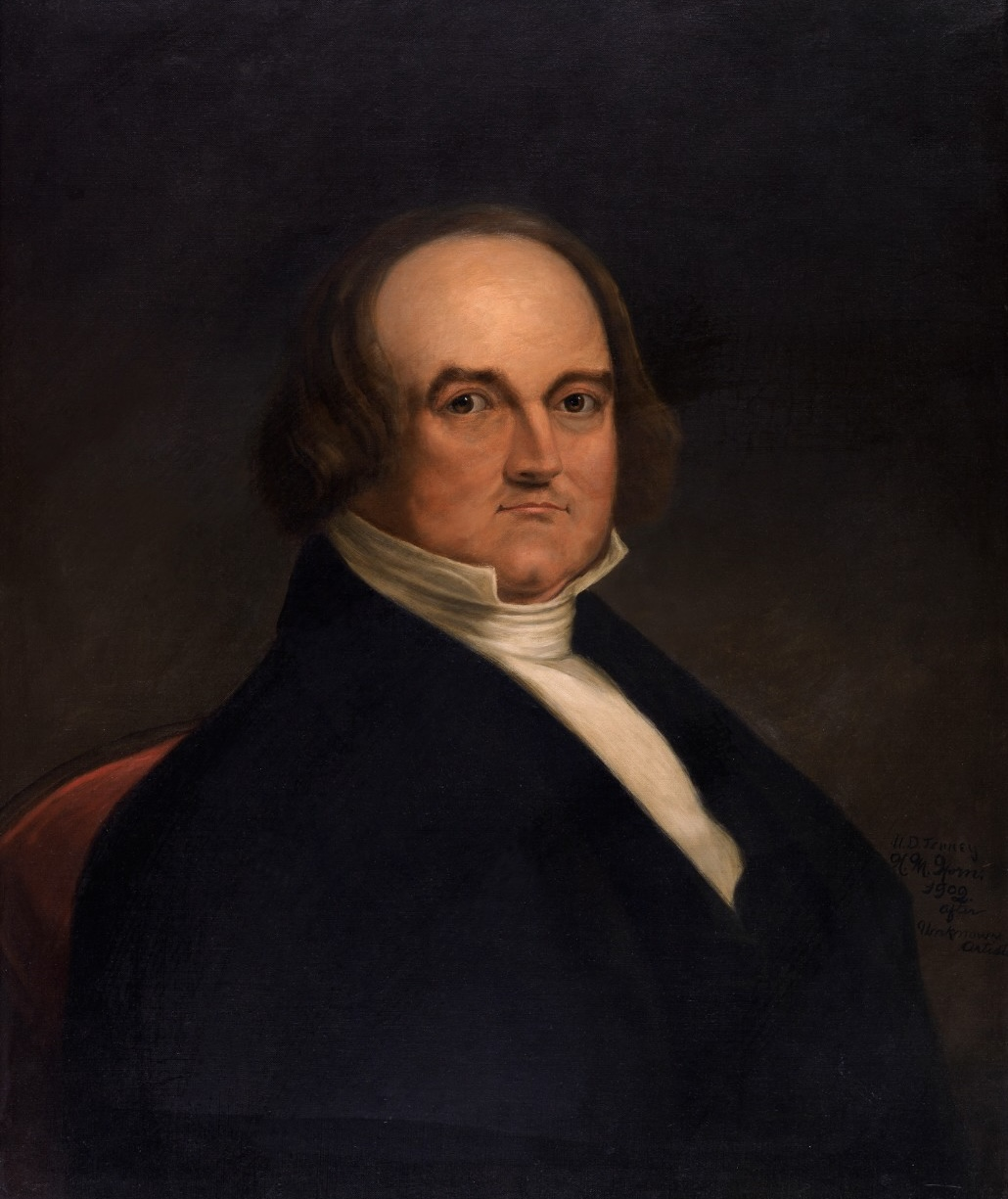

14th United States Secretary of the Navy
- In office July 24, 1843 – February 18, 1844
- President: John Tyler
- Preceded by: Abel Upshur
- Succeeded by: Thomas Gilmer

4th Collector of the Port of Boston
- In office 1829–1837
- Appointed by: Andrew Jackson
- Preceded by: Henry Alexander Scammell Dearborn
- Succeeded by: George Bancroft

Member of the Massachusetts Senate from Suffolk County
- In office May 31, 1826 – May 30, 1827

Personal details
- Born: April 2, 1791 Leicester, Massachusetts, U.S.
- Died: November 11, 1852 (aged 61) Leicester, Massachusetts, U.S.
- Party: Democratic

David Henshaw (April 2, 1791 – November 11, 1852), son of Captain David Henshaw and Mary Sargent, was the 14th United States Secretary of the Navy.

== Biography ==
Henshaw was born in Leicester, Massachusetts in 1791 and educated at Leicester Academy. Trained as a druggist, he achieved notable success in that field, then expanded his energies into banking, transportation and politics. Before he was 33 he had acquired means to become a banker and to establish an insurance company. The panic of 1837 forced his "Commonwealth Bank' into bankruptcy. He was elected to the Massachusetts Senate in 1826 and served as Collector of the Port of Boston from 1827 to 1830. In 1828, he handled a project for running railroad through the Berkshires to Albany, New York. Though he suffered business reverses during the later 1830s, Henshaw regained his political position as a leader of the Massachusetts Democratic Party within a few years.

In July 1843, President John Tyler selected Henshaw as Secretary of the Navy to follow Abel P. Upshur. During his brief term in office, he addressed shipbuilding problems, selected senior officers for important seagoing commands, revised supply arrangements in the Navy Yards and attempted to establish a school for Midshipmen. Another accomplishment during his tenure was saving the USS Constitution from the scrap heap. His recess appointment as Secretary failed to receive Congressional confirmation, requiring that he leave office when his successor, Thomas W. Gilmer, was confirmed. (Gilmer was killed, after only nine days in office, by a cannon explosion while firing a salute to a ship passing in review) Henshaw then returned to Massachusetts politics. After he left this post he dominated Democratic affairs in Massachusetts until the slavery issue began to disrupt parties. He died in 1852, buried Pine Grove Cemetery, Leicester, Massachusetts.

David was conservative, he was a capitalist, a Mason, an opponent of prohibition and a friend of slaveholders. He read much and possessed a keen knowledge of men. Although he never married, he dispensed a generous hospitality at his country home in Leicester.

USS Henshaw (DD-278) was named in his honor.

== See also ==
- Unsuccessful nominations to the Cabinet of the United States
- 47th Massachusetts General Court (1826–1827)

Political offices
Preceded by Abel Upshur	United States Secretary of the Navy; 1843–1844	Succeeded by Thomas Gilmer
