= Sylvester Maxwell =

American politician and lawyer (1775–1858)

Personal details
- Born: April 16, 1775 Heath, Province of Massachusetts Bay
- Died: December 21, 1858 (aged 83) Charlemont, Massachusetts, U.S.
- Education: Yale University
- Occupation: Politician; lawyer

Sylvester Maxwell (April 16, 1775 – December 21, 1858) was an American politician and lawyer from Massachusetts.

== Early life ==
Sylvester Maxwell was born on April 16, 1775, in Heath, Province of Massachusetts Bay, to Hugh Maxwell. He graduated from Yale University in 1797.

In 1798, Maxwell taught an academy in Burke County, Georgia. He then returned to Massachusetts and studied law with Judge Hinckley of Northampton, Massachusetts, and was admitted to the bar.

== Career ==
Maxwell then practiced law in Charlemont, Massachusetts. He was involved in the municipal affairs of Charlemont for about 30 years. He served in both the Massachusetts House of Representatives and the Massachusetts Senate.

== Personal life ==
Maxwell died on December 21, 1858, in Charlemont.
