= John Mills (Massachusetts politician) =

American politician (1787-1861)

Member of the Massachusetts House of Representatives
- In office 1851–1851

14th President of the Massachusetts Senate
- In office 1826–1828
- Preceded by: Nathaniel Silsbee
- Succeeded by: Sherman Leland

Member of the Massachusetts Senate
- In office 1823–1827

Treasurer and Receiver-General of Massachusetts
- In office 1843–1844
- Governor: Marcus Morton
- Preceded by: Thomas Russell
- Succeeded by: Thomas Russell

Personal details
- Born: December 29, 1787 Sandisfield, Massachusetts, United States
- Died: September 8, 1861 (aged 73) Springfield, Massachusetts, United States
- Profession: Lawyer

John Mills (December 29, 1787 – September 8, 1862) was a Massachusetts lawyer, and politician who served as Treasurer and Receiver-General of Massachusetts, as the President of the Massachusetts Senate, and as the U.S. Attorney for the District of Massachusetts.

== Early life ==
Mills, the son of Drake Mills, was born in Sandisfield, Massachusetts on December 29, 1787.

Political offices
Preceded by Nathaniel Silsbee	14th President of the Massachusetts Senate; 1826 – 1828	Succeeded by Sherman Leland
Preceded by Thomas Russell	18th Treasurer and Receiver-General of Massachusetts; 1843–1844	Succeeded by Thomas Russell
Legal offices
Preceded by Andrew Dunlop	6th U.S. Attorney for the United States District Court for the District of Massachusetts; 1835-1841	Succeeded by Franklin Dexter
