= Barker Burnell =

American politician

Member of the U.S. House of Representatives from Massachusetts
- In office March 4, 1841 – June 15, 1843
- Preceded by: John Reed Jr.
- Succeeded by: Joseph Grinnell
- Constituency: 11th district (1841–1843); 10th district (1843)

Member of the Massachusetts Senate Nantucket and Dukes County District
- In office 1823–1823
- Preceded by: Walter Folger, Jr.
- Succeeded by: Jethro Mitchell
- In office 1825–1833
- Preceded by: Jethro Mitchell
- Succeeded by: David Joy
- In office 1838–1838
- Preceded by: David Joy
- Succeeded by: George Bruce Upton

Member of the Massachusetts House of Representatives
- In office 1821–1822

Personal details
- Born: January 30, 1798 Nantucket, Massachusetts
- Died: June 15, 1843 (aged 45) Washington, D.C.
- Resting place: Prospect Hill Cemetery, Nantucket, Massachusetts
- Party: Whig

Barker Burnell (January 30, 1798 – June 15, 1843) was an American politician who was a U.S. representative from Massachusetts for on term from 1841 to 1843.

== Biography ==
Burnell was born on January 30, 1798, in Nantucket, Massachusetts.

=== Early career ===
Burnell was a member of the Massachusetts Constitutional Convention of 1820–1821. He served as member of the Massachusetts House of Representatives in 1821–1822, and as a member of the Massachusetts Senate in 1823, from 1825 to 1833, and in 1838.

=== Congress ===
Burnell served as delegate to the Whig National Convention in 1840. He was elected as a Whig to the Twenty-seventh and Twenty-eighth Congresses and served from March 4, 1841, until his death in Washington, D.C., June 15, 1843.

=== Death and burial ===
He was interred in Congressional Cemetery. Burnell was re-interred in Prospect Hill Cemetery, Nantucket, Massachusetts, in 1844.

== See also ==
- List of members of the United States Congress who died in office (1790–1899)

U.S. House of Representatives
Preceded by John Reed, Jr.	Member of the U.S. House of Representatives from Massachusetts's 11th congressional district March 4, 1841 – March 3, 1843	Succeeded by John Z. Goodrich
Preceded by Nathaniel B. Borden	Member of the U.S. House of Representatives from Massachusetts's 10th congressional district March 4, 1843 – June 15, 1843	Succeeded by Joseph Grinnell
