= Levi Lincoln Jr. =

Massachusetts Governor and Congressman (1782–1868)

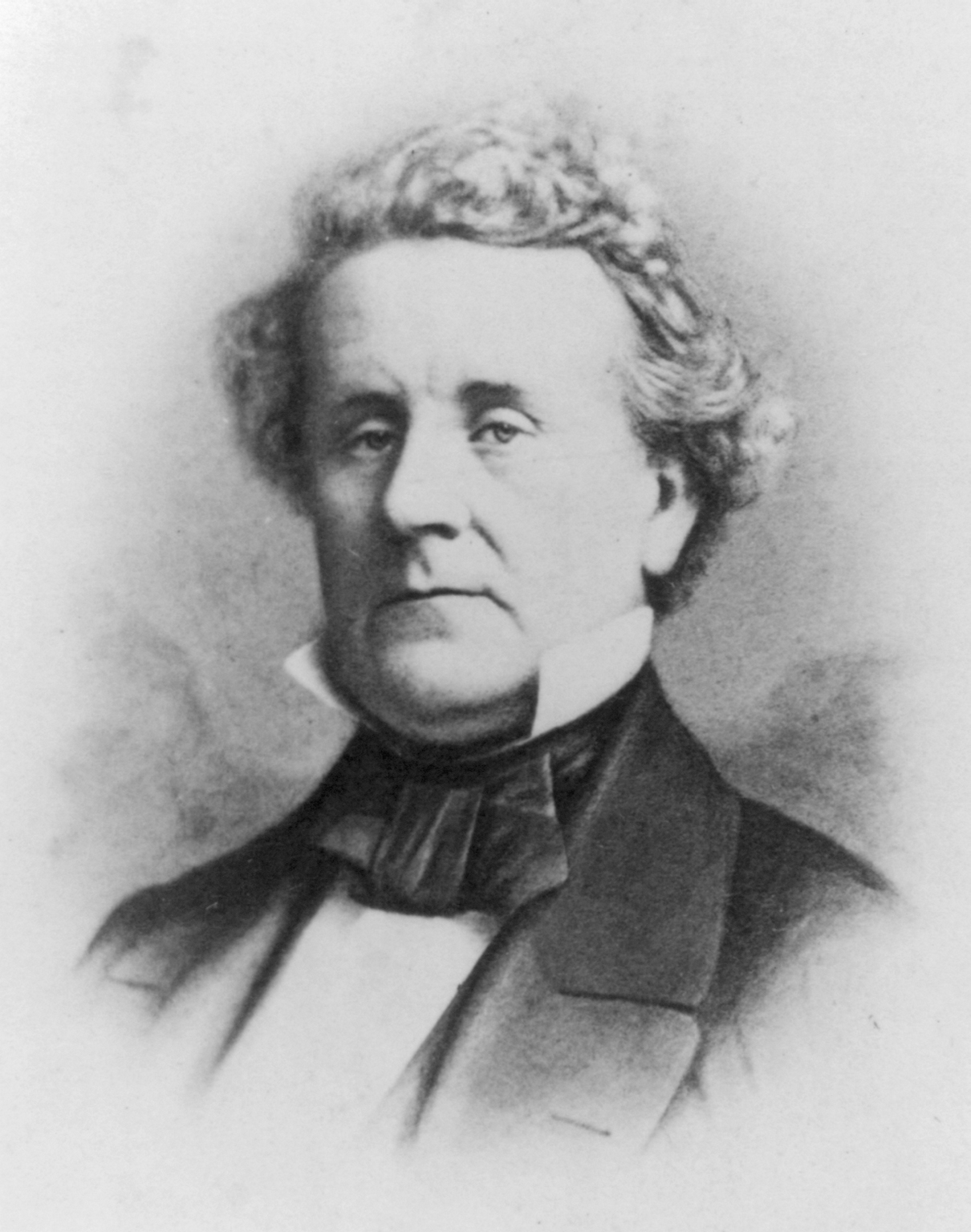

13th Governor of Massachusetts
- In office May 26, 1825 – January 9, 1834
- Lieutenant: none (1825–1826); Thomas L. Winthrop (1826–1833); Samuel Turell Armstrong (1833–1834)
- Preceded by: Marcus Morton (acting)
- Succeeded by: John Davis

11th Lieutenant Governor of Massachusetts
- In office May 31, 1823 – May 26, 1824
- Governor: William Eustis
- Preceded by: William Phillips Jr.
- Succeeded by: Marcus Morton

Member of the U.S. House of Representatives from Massachusetts's 5th district
- In office February 17, 1834 – March 16, 1841
- Preceded by: John Davis
- Succeeded by: Charles Hudson

1st Mayor of Worcester, Massachusetts
- In office April 17, 1848 – April 1, 1849
- Preceded by: Board of Selectmen
- Succeeded by: Henry Chapin

29th President of the Massachusetts Senate
- In office 1845
- Preceded by: Frederick Robinson
- Succeeded by: William B. Calhoun

23rd Speaker of the Massachusetts House of Representatives
- In office May 31, 1822 – May 31, 1823
- Preceded by: Luther Lawrence
- Succeeded by: William C. Jarvis

Member of the Massachusetts House of Representatives
- In office 1814–1820

Member of the Massachusetts Senate
- In office 1812–1814

Personal details
- Born: October 25, 1782 Worcester, Massachusetts, U.S.
- Died: May 29, 1868 (aged 85) Worcester, Massachusetts, U.S.
- Party: Republican; Whig; National Republican; Democratic-Republican
- Spouse: Penelope Winslow Sever
- Children: Daniel Waldo Lincoln
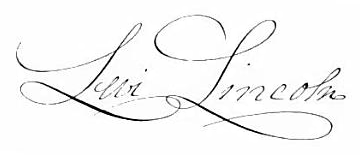
- Signature

Levi Lincoln Jr. (October 25, 1782 – May 29, 1868) was an American lawyer and politician from Worcester, Massachusetts. He was the 13th governor of Massachusetts (1825–1834) and represented the state in the U.S. Congress (1834–1841). Lincoln's nine-year tenure as governor is the longest consecutive service in state history; only Michael Dukakis (12 years), John Hancock (11 years) and Caleb Strong (10 years) served more years, but they were not consecutive.

Born to Levi Lincoln Sr., a prominent Worcester lawyer, he studied law and entered the state legislature in 1812 as a Democratic-Republican. He supported the War of 1812 (a minority position in Federalist-dominated Massachusetts) and opposed the Hartford Convention. Over the next ten years his politics moderated, and he was elected governor in 1825 in a nonpartisan landslide after serving one year on the Massachusetts Supreme Judicial Court. Lincoln oversaw significant economic development in Massachusetts during his tenure and issued the first-ever veto by a Massachusetts governor. Lincoln and Daniel Webster were leading forces in the foundation of the National Republican (later Whig) Party in Massachusetts, which dominated state politics until the 1850s.

Lincoln was elected to Congress in 1835, serving in the House of Representatives until 1841, when President William Henry Harrison appointed him collector of the Port of Boston. He was a major civic and philanthropic force in Worcester, owning and developing land in the city, and serving as its first mayor in 1848.

== Early political career ==
Levi Lincoln was born in Worcester, Massachusetts, on October 25, 1782, the firstborn child of Levi Lincoln Sr. and Martha Waldo Lincoln. His father was a lawyer who soon thereafter assumed a prominent place in state politics. Lincoln attended Harvard College, graduating in 1802, studied law with his father, and was admitted to the bar in 1805. By this time his father had served as United States Attorney General, and was a dominant figure in Worcester politics and statewide Democratic-Republican Party affairs.

Lincoln was elected to the Massachusetts State Senate in 1812 as a Republican, where he supported the War of 1812, a minority position in a state dominated by Federalists. In 1814 he was elected to the Massachusetts House of Representatives, where he opposed the Hartford Convention, a meeting of Federalist delegates from New England states to air grievances on the conduct of the war. He served terms in the state legislature until 1822, the last year as Speaker of the House. He was elected to the Massachusetts Constitutional Convention of 1820–1821, called after Maine was separated from the state. The separation of Maine included the division of its extensive public lands, in which Massachusetts retained an ownership interest. Lincoln represented Massachusetts on the commission that oversaw the division of these lands.

Over this time Lincoln's political views progressively moderated, and he came to be seen as relatively nonpartisan with respect to the Republican-Federalist divide. His opposition to the Hartford Convention raised his profile, and during the contentious Constitutional Convention debates, he maintained positive relations with political friends and foes. In 1823 he was elected lieutenant governor, serving under moderate Republican Governor William Eustis. In 1824 Eustis nominated him to fill a vacancy on the Massachusetts Supreme Judicial Court created by the resignation of Maine justice George Thatcher. That year he was elected a Fellow of the American Academy of Arts and Sciences.

== Governor ==
In 1825 Lincoln was approached by Republican party leaders about running for governor. Adopting a firmly centrist stance, he refused to run as the candidate of a single party. When a Federalist caucus seconded the nomination, he agreed to stand and won the election in a landslide against insignificant opposition. For the next five years, he ran virtually unopposed, only occasionally facing opposition from what were basically single-issue candidates and the weak perennial Democratic candidate Marcus Morton. Historian Ronald Formisano characterizes Lincoln's administration as "basically a National Republican, proto-Whig administration." In 1832, opposition parties began to gain strength, and he won a narrow majority over Democratic and Anti-Masonic opposition.

Economic development issues dominated Lincoln's tenure in office. He was a regular supporter of development initiatives and worked to change state laws to limit the liability of corporate investors. He ordered the state's first geographical and topographical surveys. The opening in 1825 of the Erie Canal (connecting New York City to the Great Lakes) and the Blackstone Canal (connecting Worcester to Providence, Rhode Island) in 1828 presented challenges to Boston's dominance as a shipping hub. Lincoln early on proposed a canal connecting Boston to the Connecticut River, but this idea never caught on. His government eventually approved plans for the construction of a railroad connecting Boston to Albany, New York, chartering its first stage, the Boston and Worcester Railroad, in 1831.

The railroad charter was issued in the wake of a controversy over the nature of state-issued corporate charters that led to the first-ever veto by a Massachusetts governor. In 1826, after several years of lobbying by its proponents, the legislature granted a charter to the Warren Bridge Company for a second bridge connecting Boston to Charlestown. The proprietors proposed that the bridge would charge tolls for only six years and then become free. The proprietors of the competing Charles River Bridge, which also charged tolls, objected, claiming that the state had granted it an exclusive charter for that crossing, and prevailed on Lincoln to veto the new charter. This he did; the veto was overridden in the House but not the Senate. The veto brought in a storm of criticism from populist supporters of the new bridge, who established the Free Bridge Party and ran William C. Jarvis against Lincoln in the 1827 election. Lincoln approved the charter when it was resubmitted in 1828, after which the Charles River Bridge proprietors initiated a lawsuit. With Daniel Webster as their attorney, the case Charles River Bridge v. Warren Bridge made its way to the United States Supreme Court, which in 1837 ruled that the state had not granted exclusive privileges to the Charles River Bridge proprietors.

Public health and correctional institutions were expanded during Lincoln's tenure. The state's first psychiatric hospital, the Worcester Lunatic Asylum, was authorized in 1830 and opened in 1833. The state prison, built at Charlestown in 1805, had long been a subject of agitation for reform. It was expanded in 1829 and converted to operation according to the latest Auburn system ideas. One reform idea proposed by Lincoln did not receive action from the legislature: in both 1826 and 1827 he promoted the idea of establishing a normal school to standardize the education of school teachers. These were not established until the administration of Edward Everett in the late 1830s.

Lincoln was responsible for one of the major judicial appointments in Massachusetts in the 19th century. Following the death of Massachusetts Supreme Judicial Court Chief Justice Isaac Parker, Lincoln offered the post to Lemuel Shaw, a lawyer with a solid reputation who had been at Harvard with him and had served with him in the legislature. Shaw at first refused the position, but Lincoln and Daniel Webster eventually prevailed on him to accept the seat. Shaw headed the court for thirty years, a period that included much groundbreaking jurisprudence.

Lincoln's term as governor is the longest consecutive service in the state's history. Only Michael Dukakis, John Hancock and Caleb Strong served for more years, but their terms were not all consecutive. Lincoln's brother Enoch was Governor of Maine from 1827 to 1829; they were the first two brothers to be governors simultaneously. Later combinations of brothers as governors include John (California) and William Bigler (Pennsylvania) in the 1850s, Nelson (New York) and Winthrop Rockefeller (Arkansas) in the 1960s and 1970s, and George W. Bush (Texas) and Jeb Bush (Florida) from 1999 to 2000.

Lincoln was one of several politicians whose leadership led to the solid establishment of the National Republicans and their successors the Whigs. The National Republican Party in Massachusetts grew out a coalition of former Jeffersonian Republicans (led by Lincoln) and former Federalists (led by Daniel Webster), who coalesced to support President John Quincy Adams in the late 1820s. Lincoln critically refused an offer of a position in the United States Senate in 1827, citing the need to remain in the state and strengthen the then-fragile National Republican organization. The Whig Party, which succeeded the National Republicans, dominated state politics until 1854.

== Congressman ==
In 1833 Lincoln decided not to run for reelection, intending to return to private practice. He was instead prevailed upon in early 1834 to run for the recently vacated Congressional seat of fellow Worcester Whig John Davis, who had been elected governor. The race for governor was split three ways, and no one had won a majority, sending the election to the state legislature to decide. John Quincy Adams, who had run on the Anti-Masonic ticket, withdrew and endorsed Davis, preferring him over Morton and Davis was chosen by the legislature in January 1834. Davis had been reelected to his Congressional seat as well, and resigned that to assume the governorship. In a special election in February Lincoln was elected to the vacant Congressional seat. Lincoln served in the House of Representatives until 1841. He did not particularly distinguish himself in Congress, generally supporting the Whig agenda and taking a firm stance on the outstanding border dispute between Maine and the British (now Canadian) province of New Brunswick.

In 1841 President William Henry Harrison appointed Lincoln collector of the Port of Boston, a post he held until September 1843. In what biographer Kinley Brauer terms the "only involuntary retirement in his career", Lincoln was replaced by Democrat Robert Rantoul Jr. on the order of President John Tyler. For his last statewide office, Lincoln won two terms to the state senate beginning in 1844, serving as the body's president.

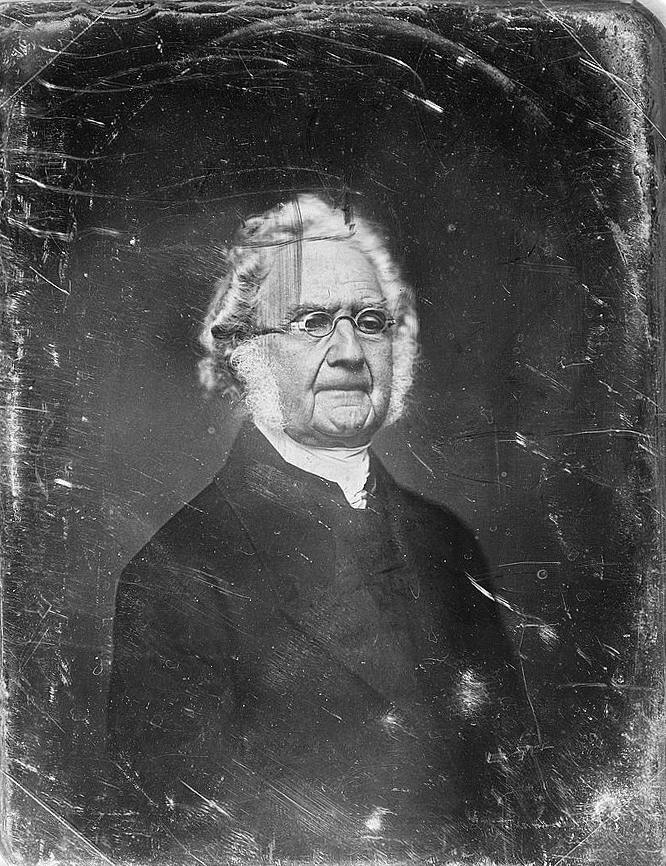
Daguerreotype by Mathew Brady thought to be of Levi Lincoln Jr.

== Growth of Worcester ==
Lincoln inherited sizable properties in central Worcester from his father, and his development activities of these and other lands he acquired had a major impact on the city's character in the 19th century. He purchased and donated to the city the land that became Elm Park; it and the adjacent neighborhood form the Lincoln Estate-Elm Park Historic District. When Worcester was smaller, there had been little class division between its various neighborhoods; however, those that Lincoln laid out on the west side of the city became the place the wealthier elements of Worcester society chose to live.

From the 1820s to the 1840s Worcester, at first a town of modest size, experienced significant growth. This was stimulated by first the construction of the Blackstone Canal and then the railroad, which connected it to Boston. The town experienced rapid industrial growth and a growing diversification of its population, especially by Irish Americans who had helped build the canal. There was political tension between the older elites, Lincoln among them, and the rising industrial working class. The arrival of Irish immigrants in the 1840s led to an increase in street gang activity and violence as the social systems of the town strained to deal with the influx. This led to calls for the town to receive a city charter, which was granted by the state in 1848.

In the first mayoral election held that year, Lincoln ran against Rodney Miller, a local temperance advocate around whom opposition to the town's elites coalesced. Lincoln carried the election by more than ten percent, and became the new city's first mayor. He held the post for one year, during which he played host to Abraham Lincoln, a distant relative from Illinois who was electioneering for Zachary Taylor on the Whig ticket in the 1848 presidential election. Worcester was carried by Free Soil candidate Martin Van Buren, although Taylor won the election.

After one year as mayor, Lincoln retired from politics. He remained active in a large number of civic organizations including the American Antiquarian Society, of which he was a founding member in 1812, and later vice president from 1854 to 1868, the Worcester Agricultural Society, and the Massachusetts Historical Society. He also served on the Board of Overseers of Leicester Academy. He briefly came out of political retirement to serve as a Republican Party presidential elector in the 1864 election, casting his vote for Abraham Lincoln. He was also a presidential elector in 1824 and 1848. He died in Worcester on May 29, 1868, and was interred in Worcester Rural Cemetery.

== Family and legacy ==
Lincoln married Penelope Winslow Sever on September 6, 1807. She was a descendant of Plymouth Colony Governor Edward Winslow and a member of Worcester's Chandler family. The couple had nine children, of whom one died young and three others predeceased their father. Levi Lincoln's younger brother, Enoch Lincoln, served as Governor of Maine for 2 years during Levi's long service as Governor of Massachusetts.

As a consequence of the Lincoln family's prominence in Worcester, the city has a number of landmarks (streets, buildings and parks) bearing the Lincoln name. A house Lincoln had built in 1834 while awaiting completion of his 1836 mansion is listed on the National Register of Historic Places as the Gov. Levi Lincoln House. The mansion, originally on Worcester's west side, now stands as a retail establishment near the entrance to Old Sturbridge Village in Sturbridge, Massachusetts.

== Notes ==
Party political offices
First	National Republican nominee for Governor of Massachusetts; 1825, 1826, 1827, 1828, 1829, 1830, 1831, 1831, 1832	Succeeded by John Davis
Political offices
Preceded by William Phillips Jr.	Lieutenant Governor of Massachusetts; May 31, 1823 – 1824	Succeeded by Marcus Morton
Preceded by Marcus Morton as Acting Governor	Governor of Massachusetts; May 26, 1825 – January 9, 1834	Succeeded by John Davis
New office	1st Mayor of Worcester, Massachusetts; 1848	Succeeded by Henry Chapin
U.S. House of Representatives
Preceded by John Davis	Member of the U.S. House of Representatives from Massachusetts's 5th congressional district February 17, 1834 – March 16, 1841	Succeeded by Charles Hudson
Legal offices
Preceded by George Thatcher	Associate Justice of the Massachusetts Supreme Judicial Court; 1824–1825	Succeeded by Marcus Morton
