= 1875 in the United States =

- Decades: 1850s; 1860s; 1870s; 1880s; 1890s
- See also: History of the United States (1865–1918); Timeline of United States history (1860–1899); List of years in the United States

Events from the year 1875 in the United States.

== Incumbents ==
=== Federal government ===
- President: Ulysses S. Grant (R-Illinois)
- Vice President:

Henry Wilson (R-Massachusetts) (until November 22)
vacant (starting November 22)

- Chief Justice: Morrison Waite (Ohio)
- Speaker of the House of Representatives:

James G. Blaine (R-Maine) (until March 4)
Michael C. Kerr (D-Indiana) (starting December 6)

- Congress: 43rd (until March 4), 44th (starting March 4)

==== State governments ====
Governors and lieutenant governors

=== Governors ===
- Governor of Alabama: George S. Houston (Democratic)
- Governor of Arkansas: Augustus Hill Garland (Democratic)
- Governor of California:
  - until February 27: Newton Booth (Republican)
  - February 27-December 9: Romualdo Pacheco (Republican)
  - starting December 9: William Irwin (Democratic)
- Governor of Connecticut: Charles R. Ingersoll (Democratic)
- Governor of Delaware: James Ponder (Democratic) (until January 19), John P. Cochran (Democratic) (starting January 19)
- Governor of Florida: Marcellus Stearns (Republican)
- Governor of Georgia: James M. Smith (Democratic)
- Governor of Illinois: John Lourie Beveridge (Republican)
- Governor of Indiana: Thomas A. Hendricks (Democratic)
- Governor of Iowa: Cyrus C. Carpenter (Republican)
- Governor of Kansas: Thomas A. Osborn (Republican)
- Governor of Kentucky: Preston H. Leslie (Democratic) (until August 31), James B. McCreary (Democratic) (starting August 31)
- Governor of Louisiana: William Pitt Kellogg (Republican)
- Governor of Maine: Nelson Dingley Jr. (Republican)
- Governor of Maryland: James B. Groome (Democratic)
- Governor of Massachusetts: Thomas Talbot (Republican) (until January 7), William Gaston (Democratic) (starting January 7)
- Governor of Michigan: John J. Bagley (Republican)
- Governor of Minnesota: Cushman K. Davis (Republican)
- Governor of Mississippi: Adelbert Ames (Republican)
- Governor of Missouri: Silas Woodson (Democratic) (until January 12), Charles Henry Hardin (Democratic) (starting January 12)
- Governor of Nebraska: Robert Wilkinson Furnas (Republican) (until January 11), Silas Garber (Republican) (starting January 11)
- Governor of Nevada: Lewis R. Bradley (Democratic)
- Governor of New Hampshire: James A. Weston (Democratic) (until June 10), Person C. Cheney (Republican) (starting June 10)
- Governor of New Jersey: Joel Parker (Democratic) (until January 19), Joseph D. Bedle (Democratic) (starting January 19)
- Governor of New York: Samuel J. Tilden (Democratic) (starting January 1)
- Governor of North Carolina: Curtis Hooks Brogden (Republican)
- Governor of Ohio: William Allen (Democratic)
- Governor of Oregon: La Fayette Grover (Democratic)
- Governor of Pennsylvania: John F. Hartranft (Republican)
- Governor of Rhode Island: Henry Howard (Republican) (until May 25), Henry Lippitt (Republican) (starting May 25)
- Governor of South Carolina: Daniel Henry Chamberlain (Republican)
- Governor of Tennessee: John C. Brown (Democratic) (until January 18), James D. Porter (Democratic) (starting January 18)
- Governor of Texas: Richard Coke (Democratic)
- Governor of Vermont: Asahel Peck (Republican)
- Governor of Virginia: James L. Kemper (Democratic)
- Governor of West Virginia: John J. Jacob (Democratic)/(Independent)
- Governor of Wisconsin: William Robert Taylor (Democratic)

=== Lieutenant governors ===
- Lieutenant Governor of Alabama: Robert F. Ligon (Democratic)
- Lieutenant Governor of California:
  - until February 27: Romualdo Pacheco (Republican)
  - February 27-December 9: William Irwin (Democratic)
  - starting December 9: James A. Johnson (Democratic)
- Lieutenant Governor of Connecticut: George G. Sill (Republican)
- Lieutenant Governor of Florida: vacant
- Lieutenant Governor of Illinois: John Early (Republican) (until January 8), Archibald A. Glenn (Democratic) (starting January 8)
- Lieutenant Governor of Indiana: Leonidas Sexton (Republican)
- Lieutenant Governor of Iowa: Joseph Dysart (Republican)
- Lieutenant Governor of Kansas: Elias Sleeper Stover (Republican) (until month and day unknown), Melville J. Salter (Republican) (starting month and day unknown)
- Lieutenant Governor of Kentucky: John G. Carlisle (Democratic) (until August 31), John C. Underwood (Democratic) (starting August 31)
- Lieutenant Governor of Louisiana: Caesar Antoine (Republican)
- Lieutenant Governor of Massachusetts: Thomas Talbot (Republican) (until January 7), Horatio G. Knight (Republican) (starting January 7)
- Lieutenant Governor of Michigan: Henry H. Holt (Republican)
- Lieutenant Governor of Minnesota: Alphonso Barto (Republican)
- Lieutenant Governor of Mississippi: Alexander K. Davis (Republican)
- Lieutenant Governor of Missouri: Charles Phillip Johnson (Liberal Republican) (until January 12), Norman Jay Coleman (Democratic) (starting January 12)
- Lieutenant Governor of Nevada: Pressly C. Hyman (political party unknown) (until month and day unknown), Jewett W. Adams (Democratic) (starting month and day unknown)
- Lieutenant Governor of New York: William Dorsheimer (Democratic) (starting January 1)
- Lieutenant Governor of North Carolina: vacant
- Lieutenant Governor of Ohio: Alphonso Hart (Republican)
- Lieutenant Governor of Pennsylvania: John Latta (Democratic) (starting month and day unknown)
- Lieutenant Governor of Rhode Island: Charles C. Van Zandt (Republican) (until May 25), Henry Tillinghast Sisson (political party unknown) (starting May 25)
- Lieutenant Governor of South Carolina: Richard Howell Gleaves (Republican)
- Lieutenant Governor of Tennessee: A. T. Lacey (Democratic) (until month and day unknown), Thomas H. Paine (Democratic) (starting month and day unknown)
- Lieutenant Governor of Texas: Richard B. Hubbard (Democratic)
- Lieutenant Governor of Vermont: Lyman G. Hinckley (Republican)
- Lieutenant Governor of Virginia: Robert E. Withers (Democratic) (until March 1), Henry Wirtz Thomas (Republican) (starting March 1)
- Lieutenant Governor of Wisconsin: Charles D. Parker (Democratic)

== Events ==
- January 25 – Anti-Slavery Society forms in New York.
- February 25 – The majority of the Yavapai (Wipukyipai) and Tonto Apache (Dil Zhéé) tribes are forced by the U.S. Cavalry under command of Brigadier General George Crook to walk at gunpoint from the Arizona's Verde Valley to the San Carlos Apache Indian Reservation, 180 miles to the southeast. The two tribes are not allowed to return to the Verde Valley until 1900.
- February 27 – Newton Booth, 11th governor of California, resigns, having been elected senator. Lieutenant Governor of California Romualdo Pacheco becomes the 12th governor. He is later replaced by elected governor William Irwin.
- March 1 – The United States Congress passes the Civil Rights Act, which prohibits racial discrimination in public accommodations and jury duty.
- March 3
  - President Grant authorizes issue of a twenty-cent piece (abolished 3 years later).
  - The Page Act of 1875 is enacted. Passed amid rising nativistic and anti-Chinese sentiment, the Act restricts the immigration of Chinese women to the U.S.
- March 15 – Roman Catholic Archbishop of New York John McCloskey is named the first cardinal in the U.S.
- April – 'Albert's swarm' of Rocky Mountain locusts begins to devastate the western United States.
- April 10 – Law Telegraph Company is founded.
- April 25 – Ten sophomores from Rutgers College (modern-day Rutgers University) steal a one-ton cannon from the campus of the College of New Jersey (modern-day Princeton University) and start the Rutgers–Princeton Cannon War.
- May 17 – Aristides wins the first Kentucky Derby.
- June – The record-setting clipper Flying Cloud of 1851 is burned for scrap metal.
- June 4 – Two American colleges play each other in arguably the first game of College Football: Tufts University and Harvard University at Jarvis Field in Cambridge, Massachusetts
- July 2 – The trial, begun on January 4, for criminal conversation brought against popular preacher Henry Ward Beecher by Theodore Tilton for alleged adultery with his wife, suffragist Elizabeth Richards Tilton, in Brooklyn ends with a hung jury.
- July 24 – The Mohican Base Ball Club is established in Kennett Square, Pennsylvania.
- August 9 – Joe Borden throws a 4 hit shoutout against future baseball hall of famer Pud Galvin and the St. Louis Brown Stockings 16–0
- September 1 – A murder conviction begins to break the power of the violent Irish-American anti-owner coal miners, the "Molly Maguires".
- October 16 – Brigham Young University is founded in Provo, Utah. This year also Wasatch Academy is founded by Duncan McMillan in Mount Pleasant, Utah.
- October 25 – The first performance of the Piano Concerto No. 1 by Pyotr Ilyich Tchaikovsky is given in Boston, Massachusetts with Hans von Bülow as soloist.
- October 30 – The Theosophical Society is founded in New York by Helena Blavatsky, H. S. Olcott, W. Q. Judge, and others.
- November 9 – Indian Wars: In Washington, D.C., Indian Inspector E. C. Watkins issues a report stating that hundreds of Sioux and Cheyenne associated with Sitting Bull and Crazy Horse are hostile to the United States (the Battle of the Little Bighorn is fought in Montana the next year).
- November 22 – Vice President Henry Wilson dies of a stroke.
- December 4 – Notorious New York City politician Boss Tweed escapes from prison and flees to Cuba, then to Spain.
- December 9 – The Massachusetts Rifle Association, "America's oldest active gun club", is formed.

=== Undated ===
- The Tong Wars begin in San Francisco.
- Conoco established as the Continental Oil and Transportation Company.

=== Ongoing ===
- Reconstruction era (1865–1877)
- Gilded Age (1869–c. 1896)
- Depression of 1873–79 (1873–1879)

== Births ==
- January 5 – J. Stuart Blackton, film producer (died 1941)
- January 7 – Thomas Hicks, runner (died 1952)
- January 9 – Gertrude Vanderbilt Whitney, sculptor and socialite (died 1942)
- January 15 – Thomas Burke, sprinter (died 1929)
- January 17 – William Robinson Brown, businessman and horse breeder (died 1955)
- January 22 – D. W. Griffith, film director (The Birth of a Nation) (died 1948)
- January 31 – Horace B. Carpenter, film actor and screenwriter (died 1945)
- March 9 – Evelyn Sears, tennis player (died 1966)
- March 25 – Spencer Charters, actor (died 1943)
- March 28 – Helen Westley, actress (died 1942)
- April 2 – Walter Chrysler, automobile pioneer (died 1940)
- April 4 – Samuel S. Hinds, film actor (died 1948)
- April 9 – Jacques Futrelle, fiction writer (died in sinking of the RMS Titanic 1912)
- April 15 – James J. Jeffries, heavyweight boxer (died 1953)
- May – Paul Sarebresole, ragtime composer (died 1911)
- May 4 – John J. Blaine, U.S. Senator from Wisconsin from 1927 to 1933 (died 1934)
- May 6 – William D. Leahy, admiral (died 1959)
- May 11 – Harriet Quimby, pilot (killed in aviation accident 1912)
- May 23 – Alfred P. Sloan, automobile industrialist (died 1966)
- June 6 – J. Farrell MacDonald, character actor and film director (died 1952)
- June 25 – William V. Mong, film actor, screenwriter and director (died 1940)
- June 26 – Camille Zeckwer, composer (died 1924)
- July 1 – Joseph Weil, con man (died 1976)
- July 2 – Hubert D. Stephens, U.S. Senator from Mississippi from 1923 to 1935 (died 1946)
- July 10 – Mary McLeod Bethune, African American educator (died 1955)
- July 15 – Francis Pierlot, American actor (died 1955)
- July 19 – Alice Dunbar Nelson, African American poet, journalist and political activist of the Harlem Renaissance (died 1935)
- August 11 – Raymond E. Willis, U.S. Senator from Indiana from 1941 to 1947 (died 1956)
- August 27 – Katharine McCormick, suffragist (died 1967)
- September 1 – Edgar Rice Burroughs, popular novelist (d. 1950)
- September 9 – Delphia Welford, Supercentenarians (Died 1992)
- September 16 – James Cash Penney, businessman, founder of J. C. Penney (died 1971)
- September 17 – John H. Overton, U.S. Senator from Louisiana from 1933 to 1948 (died 1948)
- October 23 – Gilbert N. Lewis, chemist, first to isolate deuterium (died 1946)
- October 25 – Carolyn Sherwin Bailey, author and educator (died 1961)
- October 29 – Alva B. Adams, U.S. Senator from Colorado from 1923 to 1924 and from 1933 to 1941 (died 1941)
- November 6 – Richard L. Murphy, U.S. Senator from Iowa from 1933 to 1936 (died 1936)
- November 11 – John Jenkins, auto racer (died 1945)
- November 13 – Jimmy Swinnerton, cartoonist and artist (died 1974)
- November 19 – Hiram Bingham III, explorer of South America and U.S. Senator from Connecticut from 1924 to 1933 (died 1956)
- November 30 – Myron Grimshaw, baseball player (died 1936)
- December 19 – Carter G. Woodson, historian, author, teacher, creator of 'Black History Month' (died 1950)
- Percy MacKaye, dramatist and poet (died 1956)

== Deaths ==
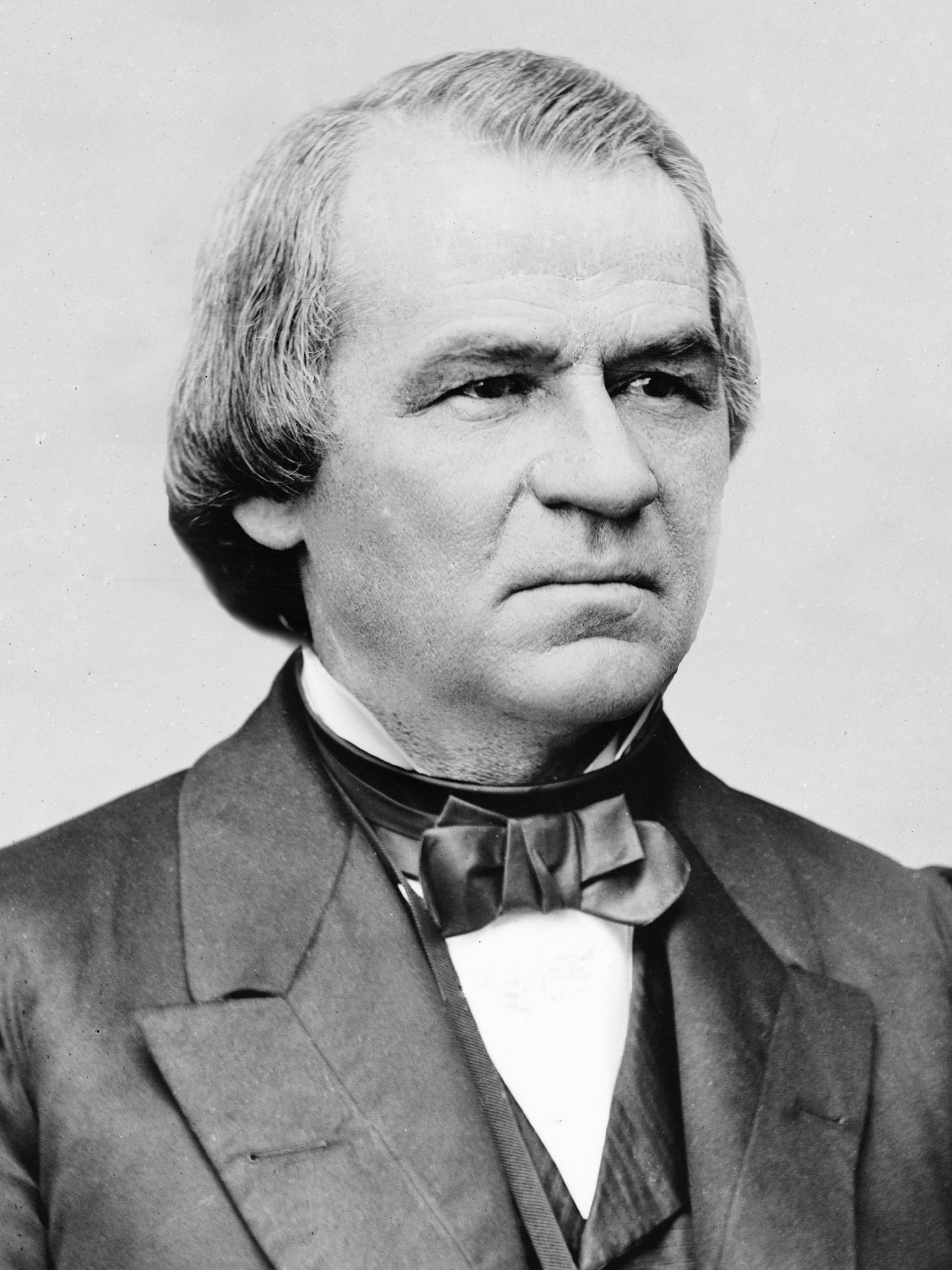
Andrew Johnson

- January 18 – William Henry Aspinwall, financier (born 1807)
- January 22 – Charles Sprague, banker and poet (born 1791)
- February 5 – William Alfred Buckingham, U.S. Senator from Connecticut from 1869 to 1875 (born 1804)
- February 7 – Edmund Spangler, carpenter and stagehand employed at Ford's Theatre at the time of the assassination of Abraham Lincoln (born 1825)
- May 17 – John C. Breckinridge, 14th vice president of the United States from 1857 to 1861 (born 1821)
- May 20 – Jesse D. Bright, U.S. Senator from Indiana from 1845 to 1862 (born 1812)
- July 8 – Francis Preston Blair Jr., U.S. Senator from Missouri from 1871 to 1873 (born 1821)
- July 10 – Henry L. Benning, Confederate general, lawyer, and judge (born 1814)
- July 25 – Celia M. Burleigh, women's rights activist and Unitarian pastor (born 1826)
- July 29 – Paschal Beverly Randolph, occultist (born 1825)
- July 30 – George Pickett, Confederate General (born 1825)
- July 31 – Andrew Johnson, 17th president of the United States from 1865 to 1869, 16th vice president of the United States from March to April 1865 (born 1808)
- August 11 – William Alexander Graham, U.S. Senator from North Carolina from 1840 to 1843, Confederate States Senator from 1864 to 1865, 30th Governor of North Carolina from 1845 to 1849 and U.S. Secretary of the Navy from 1850 to 1852 (born 1804)
- August 17 – John B. Weller, U.S. Senator from California from 1852 to 1857 (born 1812)
- October 15 – Lone Horn, Native American Chief (born 1790)
- November 21 – Orris S. Ferry, U.S. Senator from Connecticut from 1867 to 1875 (born 1823)
- November 22 – Henry Wilson, 18th vice president of the U.S. from 1873 to 1875 (born 1812)
- November 24 – William Backhouse Astor, Sr., businessman (born 1792)
- December 13 – Théonie Rivière Mignot, restaurateur (born 1819)
- December 27 – William Alexander Richardson, U.S. Senator from Illinois from 1863 to 1865 (born 1811)

== See also ==
- Timeline of United States history (1860–1899)
