= 1878 Massachusetts gubernatorial election =

- November 5, 1878
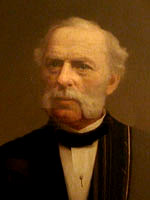

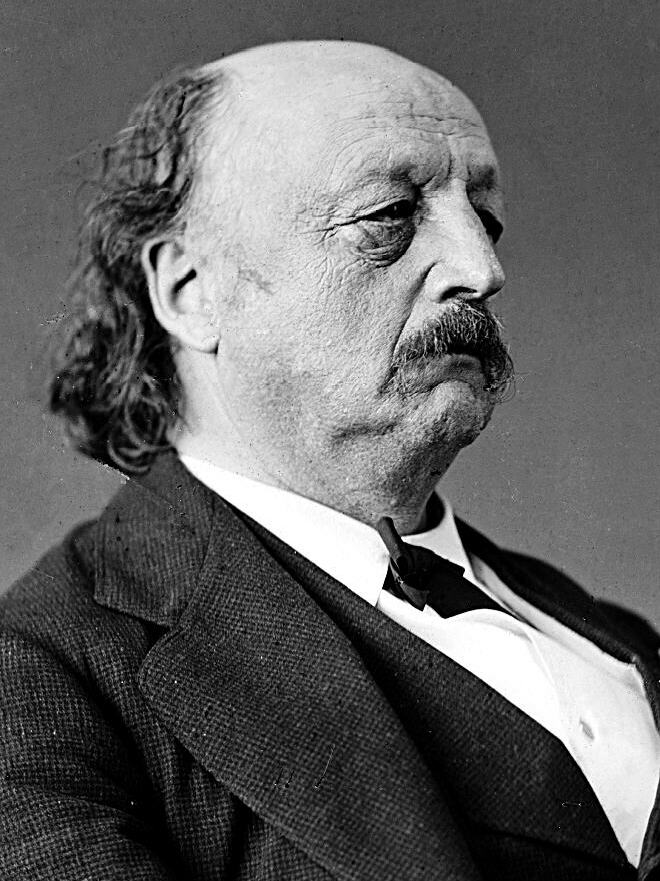
Nominee	Thomas Talbot	Benjamin Butler
Party	Republican	Greenback
Alliance		Democratic
Popular vote	134,725	109,435
Percentage	52.56%	42.69%
- Talbot: 40–50% 50–60% 60–70% 80–90% >90% Butler: 40–50% 50–60% 60–70% Abbott: 40–50%
Governor before election
Alexander H. Rice
Republican
Elected Governor
Thomas Talbot
Republican

The 1878 Massachusetts gubernatorial election was held on November 5. Former acting Governor Thomas Talbot, a Republican, defeated Benjamin Butler, who ran as an independent Greenback candidate with Democratic support. Butler's supporters secured a majority of delegates to the Democratic state convention, but his nomination was rejected by the state party committee after his supporters voted to exclude anti-Butler delegates from the convention hall.

== Background ==
Benjamin Butler spent his pre-War political career as a populist Democrat but served as a political Union general in the Civil War and was thereafter elected to five terms in Congress as a Republican. He tried to win the Republican nomination for governor several times unsuccessfully, including second-place finishes in 1871 and 1872. In his last election to Congress in 1876, Butler won despite opposition within his local party, which nominated Ebenezer R. Hoar as a breakaway candidate. In January 1877, Butler's ally George S. Boutwell was defeated for re-election to the U.S. Senate by George F. Hoar.

Butler openly entered the race by early August, and his supporters from both parties began meeting to discuss whether Butler delegates should be submitted to contest a party nomination or whether a third party should form to support him. Butler openly acknowledged that he would accept the Democratic nomination, citing his support from young Irish politicians such as Patrick A. Collins, but said he would not actively seek the nomination. Leading Butlerites acknowledged that he would likely not contest the Republican nomination.

As Butler's campaign progressed, he positioned himself as an independent candidate pledged to reform, running on a personal ticket of one rather than as the member of any party.

== Democratic nominations ==
=== Candidates ===
- Josiah Gardner Abbott, former U.S. representative from Boston
- Benjamin Butler, Republican U.S. representative from Lowell

=== Campaign ===
By September 14, the week of the Democratic convention, Butlerites had secured a decided majority of the delegates. Many anti-Butler delegates, including William Gaston, Reuben Noble, and Charles Perkins Thompson, who had defeated Butler in the 1874 House race, pledged to bolt the party in the event of his nomination. In expectation of his victory, they planned to submit planks rejecting Butlerism and Republicanism at the convention.

=== Convention ===
At around 5 A.M. on September 17, Butler delegates arrived at Mechanics' Hall in large numbers and began to conduct business with David Powers of Springfield presiding. Butler's personal secretary, Mr. McDavitt, moved to deny delegates lacking credentials entry, and the motion carried. At this point, a mob attempted to break into the hall, but the doors were closed by police.

Matthew McCafferty then entered the hall to cheers. Party Chairman Edward Avery attempted in vain to make a statement on behalf of the State Committee, but was drowned out by the crowd. A delegate moved that Avery be requested to leave, and Powers made the request, but Avery refused. McCafferty suggested that Avery was "ambitious for the honors of a martyr" and had only interrupted the convention to "go out to the blue bloods and informed them that he had served them." McCafferty said the mob had called the delegates "communists." He told Avery to inform the mob he had performed his duty and said that Avery was "anxious to relieve his bowels and should be allowed to do so." After more hissing and booing and McCafferty urging the delegates to settle down, Avery declared that the convention was adjourned until September 25.

Notwithstanding Avery's adjournment, the delegates proceeded, opening the galleries to an excited crowd and electing McCafferty temporary chairman. Dr. Gockritz of Boston rose to denounce the Democratic State Committee and declared Avery's adjournment non-binding. Richard S. Spofford was elected permanent chairman, and he delivered a speech denouncing bond-holding and banking monopolies. John L. Rice of Springfield nominated Butler for Governor, and his nomination was seconded by Mr. Cook of Boston. John C. Galvin rose to protest that no Democrat could support Butler, but was drowned out by the delegates.

=== Aftermath ===
After the convention, even those members of the State Committee who had publicly supported Butler joined the majority in denouncing him. In a letter signed by Avery, the Committee declared that the convention had not been able to proceed safely due to the threat by Butler delegates, who "entered the hall by stealth and by force, by ladders through the windows and breaking down the doors," and had been necessarily postponed until September 25 at Faneuil Hall. The Faneuil Hall convention nominated Josiah Gardner Abbott.

== Republican nomination ==
=== Candidates ===
- John Davis Long, speaker of the Massachusetts House of Representatives
- Thomas Talbot, former acting governor

=== Campaign ===
The two primary candidates for the nomination were former Governor Thomas Talbot and Speaker of the House John Davis Long.

By September 14, with Democrats divided by the Butler boom and Talbot taking a widely acknowledged lead, Republicans focused on reconciling the two factions by promising Long a spot on the ticket. Some Long supporters held out in hopes of an open ballot.

=== Convention ===
At the convention on September 18, Talbot was nominated without incident; coverage of the convention largely contrasted it to the raucous Democratic convention the night before. Long remained in the race, with his supporters claiming that he had as many as 400 delegates, though he was not expected to secure the nomination. Some Butler Republicans were present, but made no public demonstration or protest.

An informal ballot was taken as follows:

1878 Massachusetts Republican Convention
Party	Candidate	Votes	%
Republican	Thomas Talbot	851	75.71%
Republican	John Davis Long	266	23.67%
Republican	Benjamin Butler	2	0.18%
Republican	Henry L. Pierce	2	0.18%
Republican	Charles Devens	2	0.18%
Republican	Francis W. Bird	1	0.09%
Total votes		1,124	100.00%

At the announcement of Butler's name, hisses and laughter were heard. At the motion of Mr. Nichols of Boston, the convention nominated Talbot be nominated by acclamation, and three cheers were given.

The platform endorsed a resumption of specie payments, restructuring of national debt at reduced interest, civil service reform, and the Hayes administration.

== General election ==
=== Campaign ===
The election pitted Talbot and Butler's contrasting personalities and positions on monetary policy, Talbot being a mild-mannered supporter of a gold standard running on a slogan of "Honest Money, Honest Men." Financial issues dominated the campaign.

Talbot faced criticism for his temperance beliefs, as had cost him the 1875 election. Butler also attacked Talbot as a member of a Republican oligarchy which had controlled the state since the Civil War, while Republicans responded that Butler was the leader of "Repudiationists, Greenbackers, and Communists." Issue was also made of Butler's frequent party-switching and the working conditions at his Middlesex Company, which contrasted unfavorably with the conditions at Talbot Mills.

The race gained some national attention due to speculation that Butler would run for president in 1880 if he won. During the general election campaign, U.S. Representative and future President James A. Garfield of Ohio made a speech on Talbot's behalf at Faneuil Hall.

=== Results ===
Turnout was extremely high; though Butler lost handily, he received more votes than any losing candidate in history. The large Prohibitionist vote from 1877 almost completely evaporated, owing to Talbot's strong temperance stance.

1878 Massachusetts gubernatorial election
Party	Candidate	Votes	%	±%
Republican	Thomas Talbot	134,725	52.56%	▲3.09
Democratic	Benjamin Butler			
Greenback	Benjamin Butler			
Total	Benjamin Butler	109,435	42.69%	N/A
Ind. Democrat	Josiah Gardner Abbott	10,162	3.96%	N/A
Prohibition	Alonzo Ames Miner	1,913	0.75%	▼8.12
Write-in		97	0.04%	▼0.02
Republican hold		Swing		
