= 1874 Massachusetts gubernatorial election =

- November 3, 1874
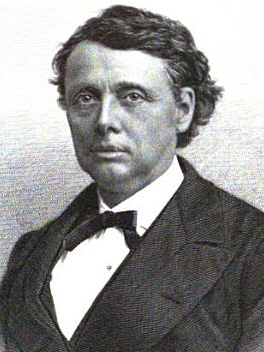

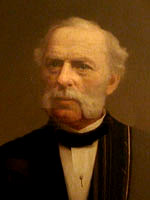
Nominee	William Gaston	Thomas Talbot
Party	Democratic	Republican
Popular vote	96,376	89,344
Percentage	51.82%	48.04%
- Gaston: 50–60% 60–70% 70–80% 80–90% Talbot: 50–60% 60–70% 70–80% 80–90% >90% Tie: 50%
Governor before election
Thomas Talbot (acting)
Republican
Elected Governor
William Gaston
Democratic

The 1874 Massachusetts gubernatorial election was held on November 3, 1874. Republican acting Governor Thomas Talbot, who took office after the resignation of William B. Washburn, was defeated by Democrat William Gaston, a former mayor of Boston.

Gaston was the first Democrat elected governor since George S. Boutwell in 1852, and received the largest share of the vote for any Democrat in the state since the party's founding in 1828.

== Republican nomination ==
=== Candidates ===
- George B. Loring, state senator from Salem
- Thomas Talbot, acting governor since April 1874

=== Campaign ===
Talbot, who had only become acting governor in April, was by no means guaranteed re-nomination by the Republicans. No candidate, including Talbot, actively sought office, but a number of alternatives were mentioned. Among those suggested were Alexander H. Rice, Henry L. Dawes, George Frisbie Hoar, and Henry L. Pierce. Talbot was thought of as the weakest Republican candidate possible on the basis of his vetoes of liquor regulation; even the prohibitionist governors William Claflin and William Washburn had accepted a tacit agreement that they would not override the legislature's will on liquor.

A proposal was made for Talbot to run for Congress in the vacant seat of Ebenezer R. Hoar, with Rice running for governor, and Henry L. Dawes for U.S. Senate. Talbot rejected this plan, as did opponents of Rice and Dawes.

Representative Benjamin Butler, who ran for the position in 1871 and had become a kingmaker in Massachusetts politics, largely stayed out of the race.

=== Convention ===
At the Republican convention in Worcester on October 7, Talbot was nominated on the first ballot with the support of Dawes and Hoar. Some suggested that their support was exchanged for Talbot's endorsement of Dawes for U.S. Senate in the coming 1875 election.

1874 Massachusetts Republican convention
Party	Candidate	Votes	%
Republican	Thomas Talbot (incumbent)	755	72.46%
Republican	George B. Loring	198	19.00%
Republican	Charles Devens	51	4.89%
Republican	John E. Sanford	20	1.92%
Republican	Benjamin Butler	16	1.54%
Republican	Henry L. Dawes	1	0.10%
Republican	George Frisbie Hoar	1	0.10%
Total votes		1,042	100.00%

== General election ==
=== Results ===
1874 Massachusetts gubernatorial election
Party	Candidate	Votes	%	±%
Democratic	William Gaston	96,376	51.82%	▲6.96
Republican	Thomas Talbot (incumbent)	89,344	48.04%	▼6.51
Write-in	All others	270	0.15%	▲0.07
Total votes		185,990	100.00%	

== See also ==
- 1874 Massachusetts legislature
