= 1877 Massachusetts gubernatorial election =

- November 6, 1877
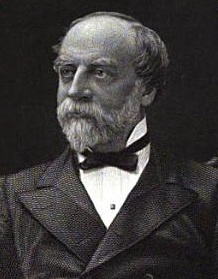

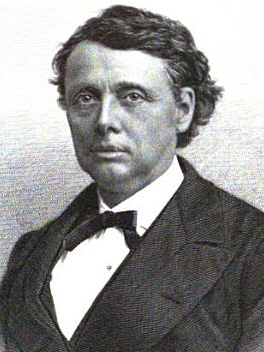

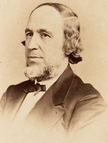
Nominee	Alexander H. Rice	William Gaston	Robert C. Pitman
Party	Republican	Democratic	Prohibition
Popular vote	91,255	73,185	16,354
Percentage	49.47%	39.68%	8.87%
- Rice: 30-40% 40-50% 50–60% 60–70% 70–80% 80–90% >90% Gaston: 30-40% 40-50% 50–60% 60–70% 70–80% Tie: 40-50%
Governor before election
Alexander H. Rice
Republican
Elected Governor
Alexander H. Rice
Republican

The 1877 Massachusetts gubernatorial election was held on November 6. Incumbent Republican governor Alexander H. Rice was re-elected to a third term in office over former governor William Gaston.

== Republican nomination ==
=== Candidates ===
- John Davis Long, speaker of the Massachusetts House of Representatives
- Alexander H. Rice, incumbent governor since 1876
- Thomas Talbot, former acting governor

=== Campaign ===
Some opposition was rallied against Governor Rice by legislators and members of the so-called "Hoosac Tunnel ring," over his opposition to restrictions on liquor. Opponents suggested former acting governor Thomas Talbot, Speaker of the Massachusetts House John Davis Long, and former Speaker John E. Sanford. Nevertheless, Rice retained the support of Boston business interests.

Rice's nomination was seen as practically assured, but some effort was made by supporters of Long, Talbot, and Henry L. Pierce to have a formal count taken of the votes. Long's was seen as the strongest group if Rice should falter. Some opposition was also voiced to renominating Rice's ticket, particularly Lieutenant Governor Horatio G. Knight and Attorney General Charles R. Train.

=== Convention ===
The convention reassembled after dinner with Senate President John B. D. Cogswell presiding. The results of the informal ballot were announced as follows:

1877 Massachusetts Republican Convention
Party	Candidate	Votes	%
Republican	Alexander H. Rice (incumbent)	478	53.05%
Republican	John Davis Long	217	24.08%
Republican	Thomas Talbot	181	20.09%
Republican	Paul A. Chadbourne	17	1.89%
Republican	John E. Sanford	4	0.44%
Republican	Henry L. Pierce	3	0.33%
Republican	Charles Devens	1	0.11%
Total votes		901	100.00%

Alanson W. Beard moved to take a formal ballot to declare Rice the nominee, and the motion carried. Stillman B. Allen declared that it was Long's previously stated wish that, under such circumstances, his name be withdrawn. The entire ticket was then formally renominated by acclamation.

== Democration nomination ==
=== Candidates ===
- William Gaston, former governor (1874–75)
- Charles Perkins Thompson, former U.S. representative from Gloucester (1875–77)

==== Declined ====
- Charles F. Adams, former minister to the United Kingdom and nominee in 1876

=== Convention ===
Charles Theodore Russell was named president of the convention, and he gave a speech denouncing the 1876 presidential election as the result of election fraud and Rutherford B. Hayes as the illegitimate occupant of the White House. Russell also denounced Reconstruction policy in the South, but commended the administration for undertaking civil service reform. He concluded by reaffirming the party's commitment to the principles of Thomas Jefferson and Andrew Jackson and discussing state affairs.

After a brief three-minute recess, Francis W. Bird rose to withdraw Charles F. Adams from consideration for a second consecutive nomination.

Patrick Collins of Boston nominated former governor William Gaston as "the only man... capable of leading the Democrats in the next election." Mr. Drew of Cambridge then rose to nominate Charles Perkins Thompson, a former U.S. representative who had traveled to Florida to investigate allegations of Republican election fraud there.

John K. Tarbox then seconded the Gaston nomination. Reuben Noble seconded the Thompson nomination and delivered a speech arguing that Gaston, during his time as governor, was unable to overcome the domination of Benjamin Butler. Boston alderman John E. Fitzgerald gave his public endorsement to Thompson as a man without enemies in the party, unlike Gaston or Adams. Thomas Riley countered that Thompson was not a candidate of his own accord, but was being offered by enemies of Gaston to weaken him.

On the first ballot, Gatson won an overwhelming majority:

1877 Massachusetts Democratic Convention
Party	Candidate	Votes	%
Democratic	William Gaston	1,190	82.52%
Democratic	Charles Perkins Thompson	236	16.37%
Democratic	Scattering	16	1.11%
Total votes		1,442	100.00%

A motion was made to declare Gaston the unanimous nominee, but it failed.

== General election ==
=== Candidates ===
- William Gaston, former governor (Democratic)
- Wendell Phillips, social reformer (Greenback, Workingmen's)
- Robert Carter Pitman, associate justice of the Massachusetts Supreme Court (Prohibition, Woman Suffrage)
- Alexander H. Rice, incumbent governor since 1876 (Republican)

=== Results ===
Massachusetts gubernatorial election, 1877
Party	Candidate	Votes	%	±%
Republican	Alexander H. Rice (incumbent)	91,255	49.47%	▼4.12
Democratic	William Gaston	73,185	39.68%	▼1.91
Prohibition	Robert C. Pitman	16,354	8.87%	▲4.09
Greenback	Wendell Phillips	3,552	1.93%	N/A
Write-in		108	0.06%	▲0.01
Republican hold		Swing		

== See also ==
- 1877 Massachusetts legislature
