= 1877 United States Senate election in Massachusetts =

- January 16–19, 1877

Majority of legislature needed to win
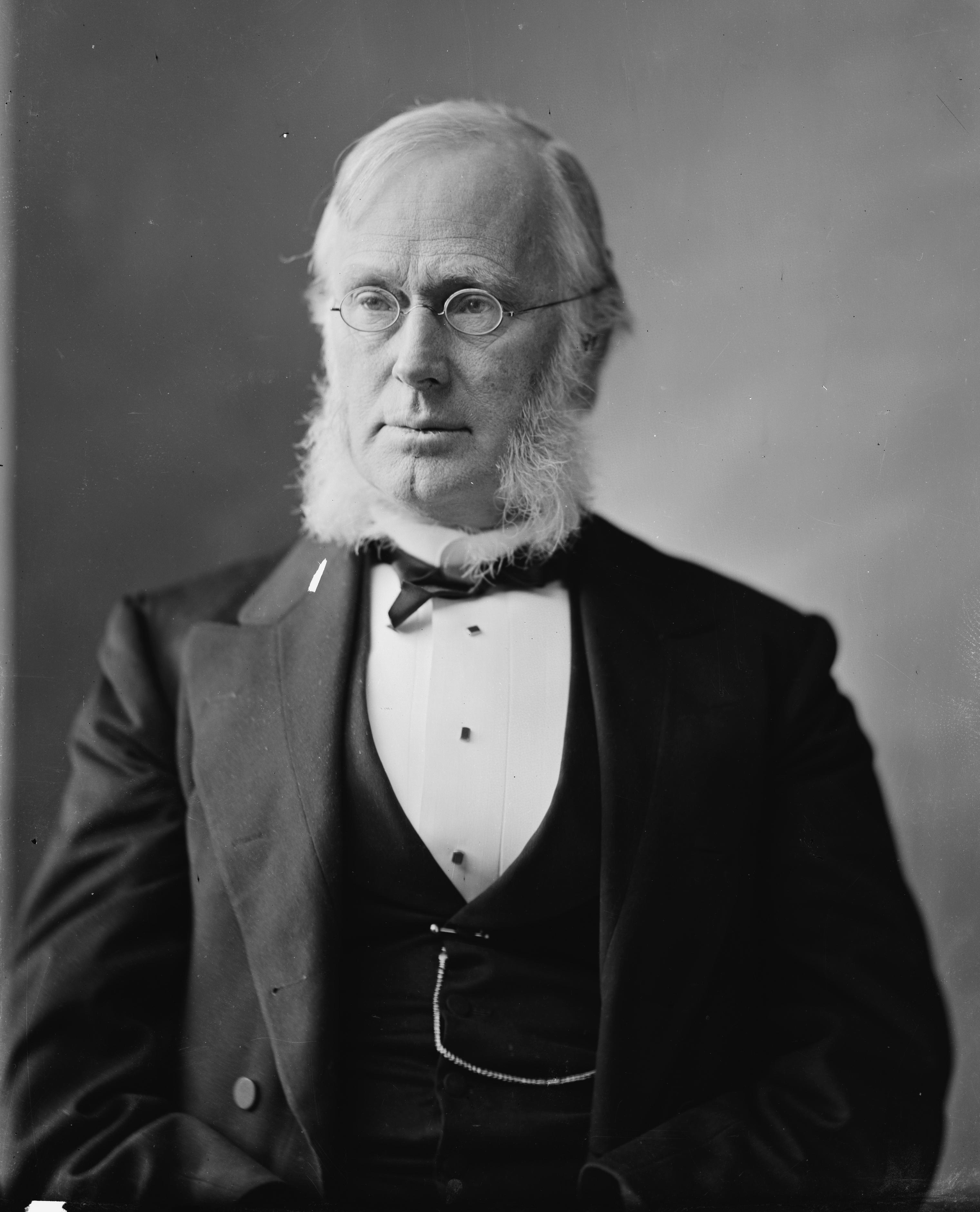

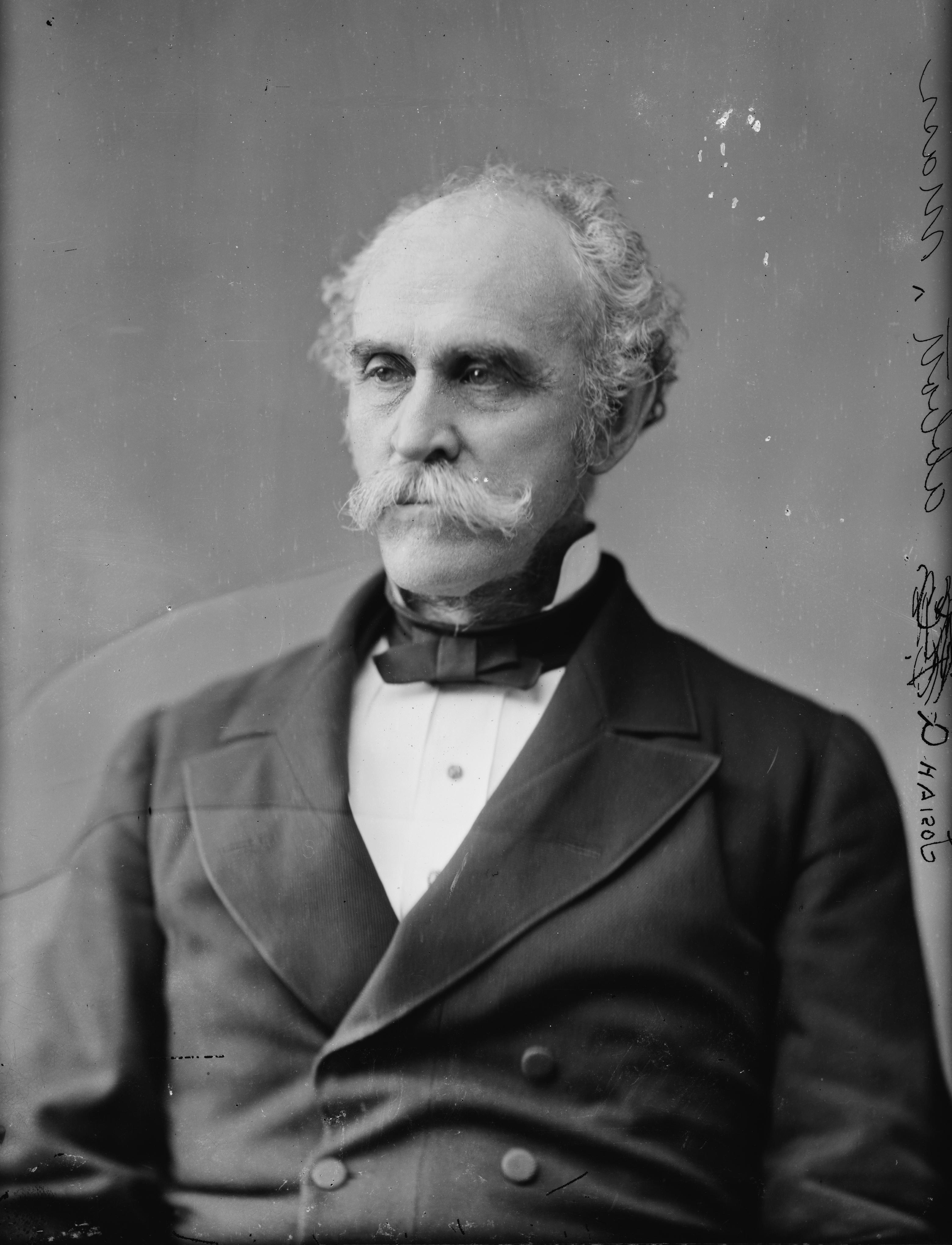

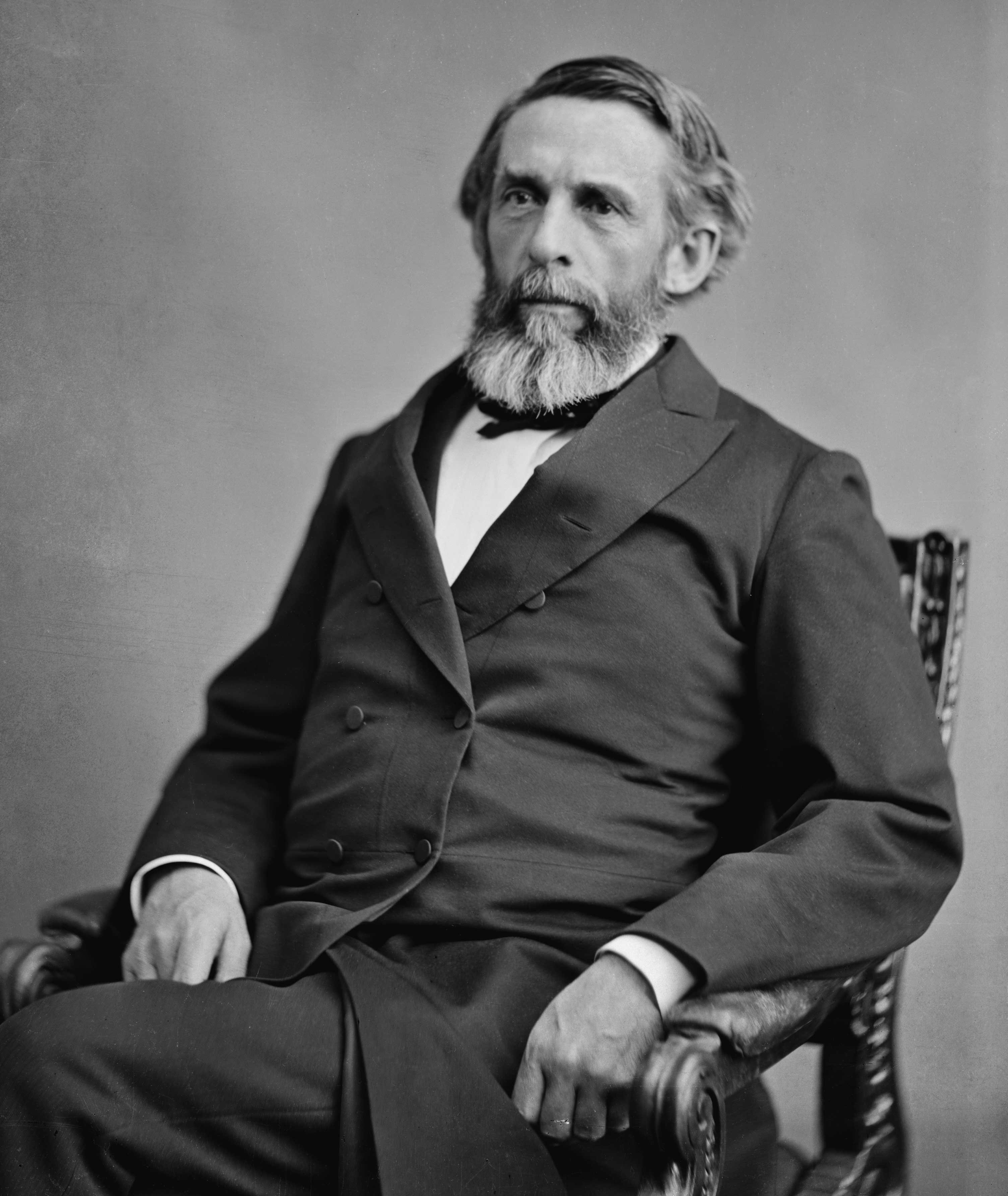

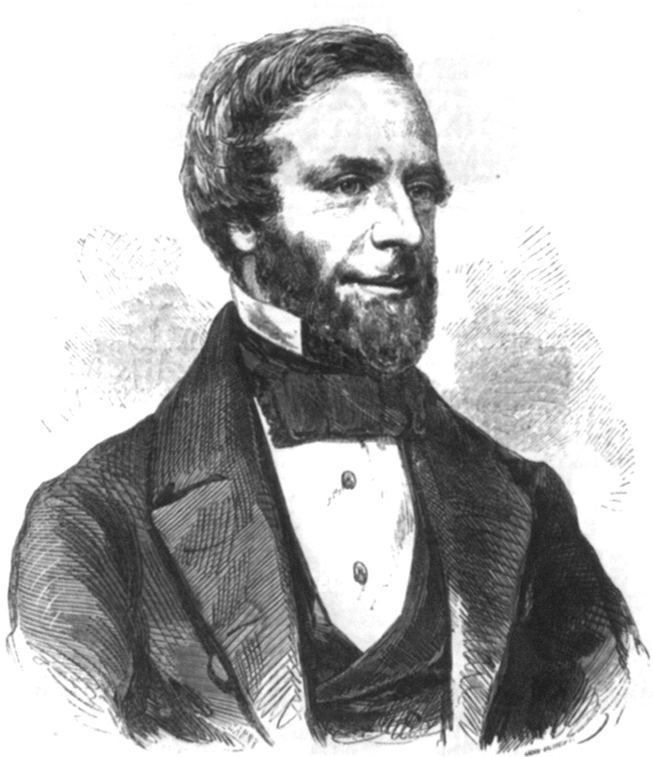
Nominee	George Frisbie Hoar	Josiah Abbott
Party	Republican	Democratic
Electoral vote	146	62
Percentage	52.52%	22.30%
Nominee	George S. Boutwell	Alexander H. Rice
Party	Republican	Republican
Electoral vote	47	19
Percentage	16.91%	6.83%
Senator before election
George S. Boutwell
Republican
Elected Senator
George Frisbie Hoar
Republican

The 1877 United States Senate election in Massachusetts was held in January 1877. Incumbent Republican Senator George S. Boutwell, who had won a special election for the remainder of Henry Wilson's term, was defeated by reformist U.S. Representative George Frisbie Hoar.

At the time, Massachusetts elected United States Senators by a resolution of the Massachusetts General Court.

== Background ==
=== State legislature ===
At the time, the Massachusetts legislature was dominated the Republican Party. The Senate was composed of 30 Republicans and 10 Democrats, and the House had 178 Republicans and 62 Democrats. However, if a split within the Republican Party emerged, Democrats could hold the balance and decide the election.

=== 1876 presidential election ===
The election took place against the backdrop of the contested 1876 presidential election. Several potential or actual candidates were involved in the Compromise of 1877 and the ongoing controversy may have affected the result.

== Candidates ==
=== Declared ===
- George S. Boutwell, incumbent Senator
- George F. Hoar, U.S. Representative from Worcester
- Julius Hawley Seelye, U.S. Representative from Amherst

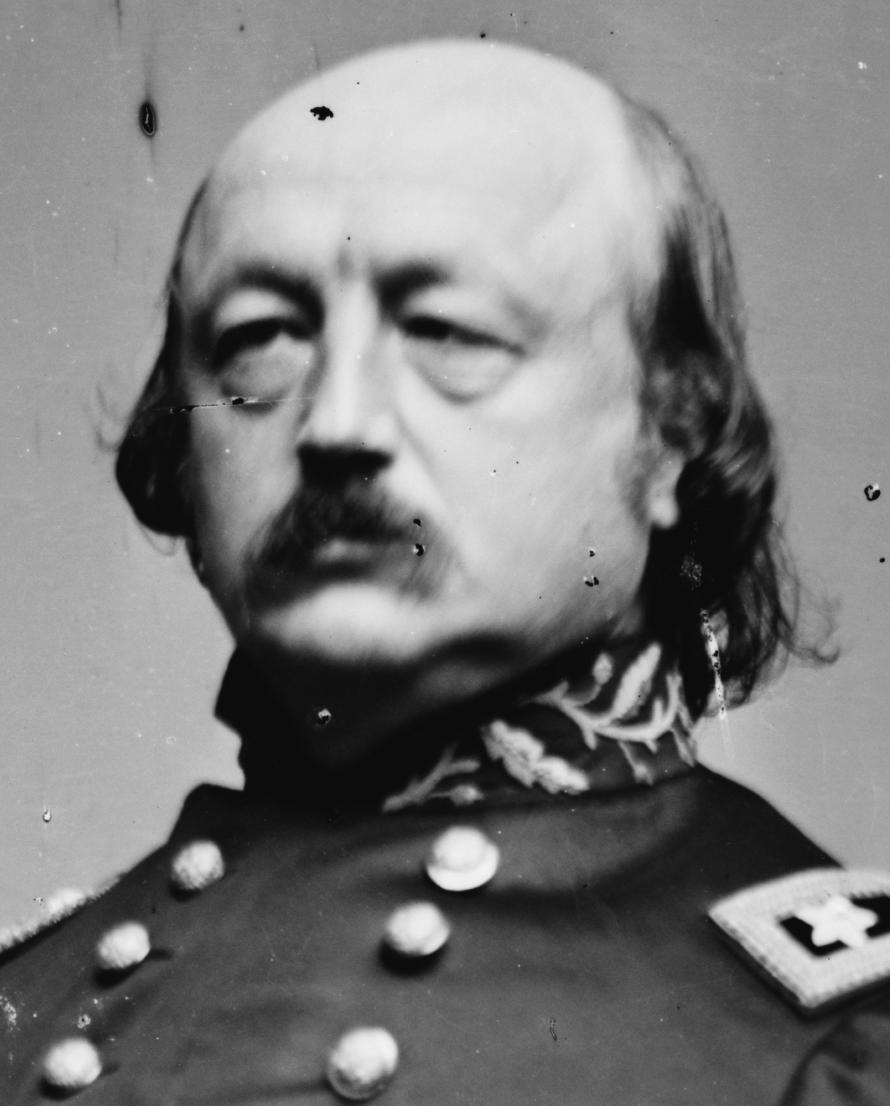
General Benjamin Butler, an eccentric and prominent figure in Massachusetts politics and a key supporter of Senator Boutwell.

George Boutwell, the former Governor and incumbent interim Senator, was backed by Benjamin F. Butler and the patronage wing of the Republican Party. He was challenged by U.S. Representative George Frisbie Hoar, a reformist who had supported Benjamin Bristow at the 1876 Republican National Convention.

=== Potential ===
The following candidates were mentioned as potential candidates or received votes, but did not openly declare their willingness or desire to be elected.

- Alexander Bullock, former Governor of Massachusetts
- Charles Devens, Judge of the Massachusetts Supreme Judicial Court and former Civil War general
- Alexander H. Rice, Governor of Massachusetts
- John E. Sanford, former Speaker of the Massachusetts House of Representatives

Other candidates mentioned included Governor Alexander H. Rice (who had the backing of prohibitionists on the basis that his election would elevate prohibitionist Republican Horatio G. Knight to the Governor's office), Judge Charles Devens, and U.S. Representative Julius Hawley Seelye. Rice was also rumored to have the support of Butler in the event Boutwell became non-viable, as this would clear the nomination for 1877, and Butler greatly coveted the office of Governor.

Democrats, under the direction of Frank Bird, were expected to cast a ceremonial vote for Josiah Abbott or William Gaston before throwing their support to a competitive candidate, possibly former Republican Governor Alexander Bullock, who was aligned with Bird. Democrats were expected to oppose Hoar as an alternative to Boutwell.

== Election ==
=== January 16 ===
On January 16, the General Court convened and began to cast votes in each house, separately.

The first day of balloting was seen as a victory for Hoar, as Boutwell's support was much lower than his supporters claimed. Democrats voted in a caucus to continue to support Abbott.

After the first day, it was conceded the Boutwell could not be elected, and the question became whether Republicans would rally to Hoar or try to find a third candidate.

=== January 17 ===
On the second day of balloting, the two houses of the General Court met in joint convention, rather than separately.

After the first ballot, Senator Brimball and Ginnodo changed their votes from Boutwell to Hoar. Abbott gained a voted after Representative Glynn voted, having missed the first ballot.

=== January 18 ===
On the third day of balloting, Senator James G. Blaine was in attendance. Secretary of the Treasury Justin Morrill sent a letter endorsing Boutwell and imploring his re-election, but it did not appear to have any effect on the vote.

=== January 19 ===
During the fifth and final ballot on January 19, many Boutwell men changed their votes to Hoar after realizing he would win.

== Results ==
Balloting by Round
Candidate	S1	S2	H1	H2	J1	J2	J3	J4	J5
▌ George Frisbie Hoar	12	12	76	77	93	95	100	104	146
▌ George S. Boutwell	17	17	78	79	95	93	88	83	47
▌ Josiah Abbott	7	7	55	55	61	62	62	62	62
▌ Alexander H. Rice	4	4	15	15	17	17	17	17	19
▌ Alexander Bullock	–	–	4	4	4	4	4	4	2
▌ Julius Hawley Seelye	–	–	4	4	4	4	3	4	1
▌ Charles Francis Adams Jr.	–	–	1	–	–	–	–	–	–
▌ Henry L. Pierce	–	–	1	–	–	–	–	–	–
▌ John E. Sanford	–	–	1	1	1	1	–	–	–
▌ Paul A. Chadbourne	–	–	–	–	–	–	–	–	1
Total	40	40	235	235	275	276	274	274	278

== Aftermath ==
Hoar would remain in the Senate until his death in 1905.

Boutwell was appointed by President Rutherford B. Hayes to codify the Revised Statutes of the United States and later served as United States counsel before the French and American Claims Commission. He later left the Republican Party over imperialism, which both he and Hoar opposed.
