= George O. Carpenter =

American businessman (1827–1896)

George Oliver Carpenter (December 26, 1827 – December 25, 1896) was an American businessman and politician who was president of the Carpenter-Morton Company and George O. Carpenter & Son and the Republican nominee in the 1870 Boston mayoral election.

== Early life ==
Carpenter was born on December 26, 1827 in Boston's North End to George and Mary Bentley (Oliver) Carpenter. He attended Boston Public Schools and graduated from the Eliot School in 1840. He attended The English High School for part of one year, but had to end his studies due to poor health.

== Business career ==
In June 1841, Carpenter went to work for John N. Barbour and Brothers. The business failed a few years after Carpenter joined it and he found work for various firms as a bookkeeper or clerk. He also spent two years as a librarian for the Mercantile Library Association.

On March 15, 1847, Carpenter was hired as an accountant by Pratt, Rogers, & Co., dealers of paints, oils, and varnishes. On January 1, 1849, Carpenter became a partner in the business, which was then known as Banker, Crocker, & Co. From 1851 to 1864, the firm was known as Banker & Carpenter. It was then known as Carpenter, Woodward, & Morton until 1893, when it was incorporated as the Carpenter-Morton Company with Carpenter as president. In 1860, the business expanded to Missouri, where it operated as the St. Louis Lead and Oil Company.

In 1872, Carpenter started an insurance agency. He was an agent for the Western Assurance Company, British America Assurance Company, United States Life Insurance Company of New York, Saint Paul Fire and Marine Insurance Co., Scottish Union and National Insurance Company, and Buffalo German Insurance Company. From 1876 to 1877 he was president of the Boston Fire Underwriters' Union. In 1885, he admitted his son, Frederick B. Carpenter as a partner and the firm became George O. Carpenter & Son.

Carpenter was also a vice president of the Home Savings Bank and a director of the Eliot National Bank and the National Bank of South Reading (later known as the National Bank of Wakefield).

== Military service ==
At the age of sixteen, Carpenter joined the Washington Phalanx of the Massachusetts Volunteer Militia. In 1845, he transferred to the Boston City Guard. In 1847, he moved to South Reading, Massachusetts, where he played an instrumental role in the formation of the Richardson Light Guard. In 1850, he was commissioned a quartermaster in the 7th Massachusetts Battery. He was later promoted to adjutant. In 1858, he was commissioned brevet brigade major of the second brigade. He then served as commander of the Richardson Light Guard until the start of the American Civil War, when he was commissioned general drillmaster and military instructor for officers appointed to commands in new regiments by Governor John Albion Andrew. He withdrew from military service after the war, but remained a member of the Ancient and Honorable Artillery Company of Massachusetts and served as the organization's commander in 1868.

== Personal life ==
On February 6, 1850, Carpenter married Maria Josephine Emerson, a member of the Emerson family of Concord, Massachusetts that included Ralph Waldo Emerson. They had two sons – George Jr., who was a businessman in St. Louis, and Frederick B., who was a partner in his father's insurance business.

Carpenter joined the Freemasons at the Wyoming Lodge in Melrose, Massachusetts. From 1870 to 1875, he was a director of the Grand Lodge of Massachusetts. He was also a member of The Bostonian Society, Massachusetts Charitable Mechanic Association, Algonquin Club, Boston Art Club, Paint and Oil Club of New England, Old Schoolboy's Association, and the Commercial Club of Boston. Carpenter was an incorporator of the South End Industrial School and was a long-time member of its finance committee.

== Politics ==
In 1861, Carpenter moved back to Boston. He was a member of the Boston Board of Aldermen in 1869 to 1870. He was the Republican nominee in the 1870 Boston mayoral election. Many Republicans organized in citizens committees that backed the candidacy of Democrat Gaston. Carpenter suffered from a public image that associated him with political corruption during his time as an alderman. Meanwhile, Gaston's past tenure as mayor of Roxbury was well-regarded. Gaston won the election with 58% of the vote.

== Death ==
In 1896, Carpenter fell ill during his annual summer trip to Europe. In late November, his illness worsened and he was confined to his residence at The Kensington. He died there on December 25, 1896. His funeral was held at the South Congregational Church on December 28. Edward Everett Hale and Minot Judson Savage presided over the ceremony.
