= 1871 Massachusetts gubernatorial election =

- November 7, 1871
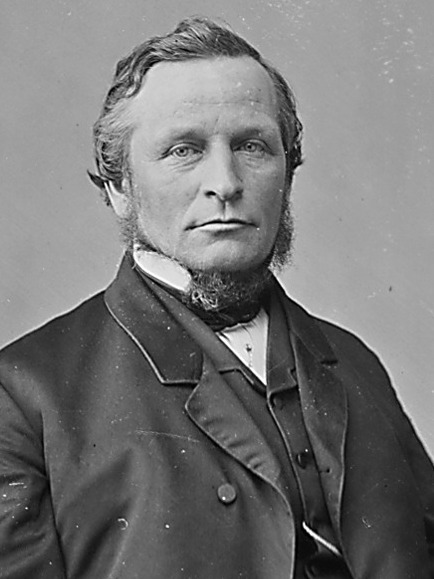

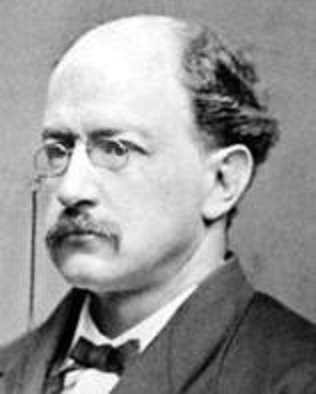

Nominee	William B. Washburn	John Quincy Adams II	Edwin M. Chamberlain
Party	Republican	Democratic	Labor Reform
Popular vote	75,129	47,725	6,848
Percentage	54.92%	34.89%	5.01%
- County results Washburn: 40–50% 50–60% 60–70% 70–80% 80–90%
Governor before election
William Claflin
Republican
Elected Governor
William B. Washburn
Republican

The 1871 Massachusetts gubernatorial election was held on November 7, 1871. Incumbent Republican Governor William Claflin did not run for a fourth term in office. He was succeeded by Republican U.S. Representative William B. Washburn, who defeated Democrat John Quincy Adams II.

== Republican nomination ==
=== Candidates ===
- Benjamin Butler, U.S. representative from Lowell
- William B. Washburn, U.S. representative from Greenfield

==== Withdrawn ====
- Harvey Jewell, speaker of the Massachusetts House of Representatives (withdrew Sep. 17)
- George B. Loring, chairman of the Massachusetts Republican State Committee and former state representative from Salem (withdrew at convention)
- Alexander H. Rice, former mayor of Boston and U.S. representative (withdrew at convention)

==== Declined ====
- William Claflin, incumbent governor

=== Campaign ===
Through July, Benjamin Butler denied that he was a candidate for governor, and George B. Loring appeared to be the early favorite, owing to strong support in the state's rural and agricultural communities. Butler entered the race soon after, placing two candidates from the Northeast in open opposition to the Claflin administration.

By August, Governor Claflin had unequivocally ruled out a fourth term, and his reformist supporters primarily went to Harvey Jewell or Alexander H. Rice in the east or William Washburn in the west. Washburn, though the last candidate to enter due to his loyalty to Claflin, was considered the strongest; he had unanimous support in the four western counties and northern Worcester County (led by his House colleagues Henry L. Dawes and George F. Hoar) and the support of many temperance and reform advocates in the east. He was also the second choice of many Jewell or Rice supporters.

In the days leading to the convention, Butler was the most active candidate on his own behalf, with the other candidates and their supporters generally aligned against him. In pre-convention credentials rulings, Butler won delegations from the 6th ward of Boston, from Athol, and from Milford. Despite this, Butler was still expected to be fifty votes short of a majority.

On the night before the convention, Butler delivered a speech denouncing the press and comparing his treatment to the Passion of Jesus. He endorsed President Grant, though his speech was followed by a supporter alluding to Butler as the "future Chief Magistrate of this country." His opponents focused on organizing into a united bloc against Butler.

=== Convention ===
The party convention was held at Mechanics' Hall in Worcester on September 27.

As the delegates entered the convention hall, Butler made a grand entry, marching to the edge of the platform and acknowledging the cheers of his supporters before elbowing through the crowd. His entrance caused a great deal of confusion among the delegates, which Butler was seen to relish. Loring, as party chair, called the convention to order and was elected temporary chair. He took the opportunity to deliver a speech professing loyalty to the Republican Party and President Grant.

At the start of business, Butler moved that the galleries "be thrown open to the people, to whom they rightly belong, that they may observe the action of their delegates." The motion, seen as a test of strength, passed 524 to 437 to the cheers of Butler supporters. Henry L. Dawes then presented a resolution to give contested delegates the right to vote until the credentials committee made a final determination; Butler denounced the resolution as unprecedented and unfair, launching into a campaign speech against machine control of the party. Dawes and Butler began a series of back-and-forth insults and barbs until the resolution was finally referred to the Committee on Credentials.

George Frisbie Hoar, an avowed supporter of Washburn, was elected permanent chairman and president. Loring then surprised the convention by withdrawing his name from consideration; most took this as an indication of unity among anti-Butler forces, but some Butler men attempted to lobby Loring supporters. Soon after, Alexander Rice withdrew and delivered a speech imploring the delegates to "act as Republicans," taken to be an anti-Butler gesture.

By 5:30 p.m., the Committee on Credentials had failed to report, and Butler moved that they issue a partial report so that voting could commence. The move was rejected, but an adjournment until 7 p.m. was achieved, taken as a victory for the Butler forces. When the convention reconvened, most of the committee's report was accepted unanimously. However, the vote on the credentials of delegates from Boston's Ward Six went to anti-Butler forces by 607 to 460. Butler attempted to impeach the conduct of the vote but failed.

The vote was taken and announced at 12:30 a.m.:

1871 Massachusetts Republican Convention
Party	Candidate	Votes	%
Republican	William B. Washburn	643	57.62%
Republican	Benjamin Butler	464	41.58%
Republican	George B. Loring	8	0.72%
Republican	Alexander H. Rice	1	0.09%
Total votes		1,116	100.00%

Butler delivered a concession speech, criticizing his opponents but declining to challenge Washburn, noting that he would not "bolt" the ticket as his opponents had threatened. He pledged to continue his campaign within the Republican Party.

The party platform embraced "strict adherence to those principles that have preserved the Union, secured freedom and equality before the law to all classes, and diminished the burdens of the people by an honest and economical administration of the Government." It celebrated the 1868 national party platform, endorsed the Ulysses S. Grant administration, and labeled itself the party of progress and reform with the "great mission... to blot out class distinction on American soil."

Washburn formally accepted his party's nomination in a letter to Hoar dated October 17.

== General election ==
=== Results ===
1871 Massachusetts gubernatorial election
Party	Candidate	Votes	%	±%
Republican	William B. Washburn	75,129	54.92%	▲2.02
Democratic	John Quincy Adams II	47,725	34.89%	▲2.62
Labor Reform	Edwin M. Chamberlain	6,848	5.01%	▼9.58
Prohibition	Robert Carter Pitman	6,598	4.98%	N/A
Write-in		336	0.25%	▼0.12
Independent	Benjamin F. Butler	157	0.12%	N/A
Total votes		136,793	100.00%	

== See also ==
- 1871 Massachusetts legislature
