= Senator Gaston =

Senator Gaston may refer to:

- William Gaston (Massachusetts politician) (1820–1894), Massachusetts State Senate
- William Gaston (1778–1844), North Carolina State Senate
