= 1872 Massachusetts gubernatorial election =

- November 5, 1872
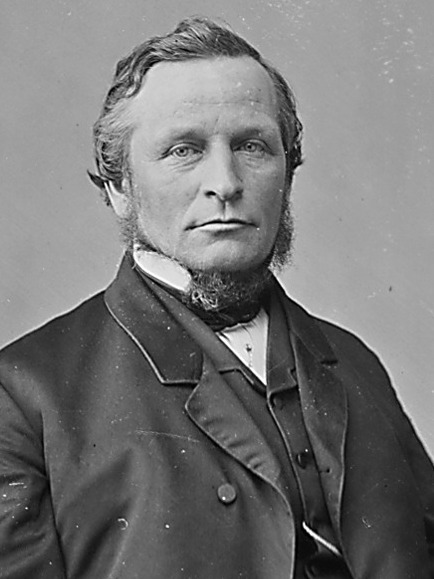

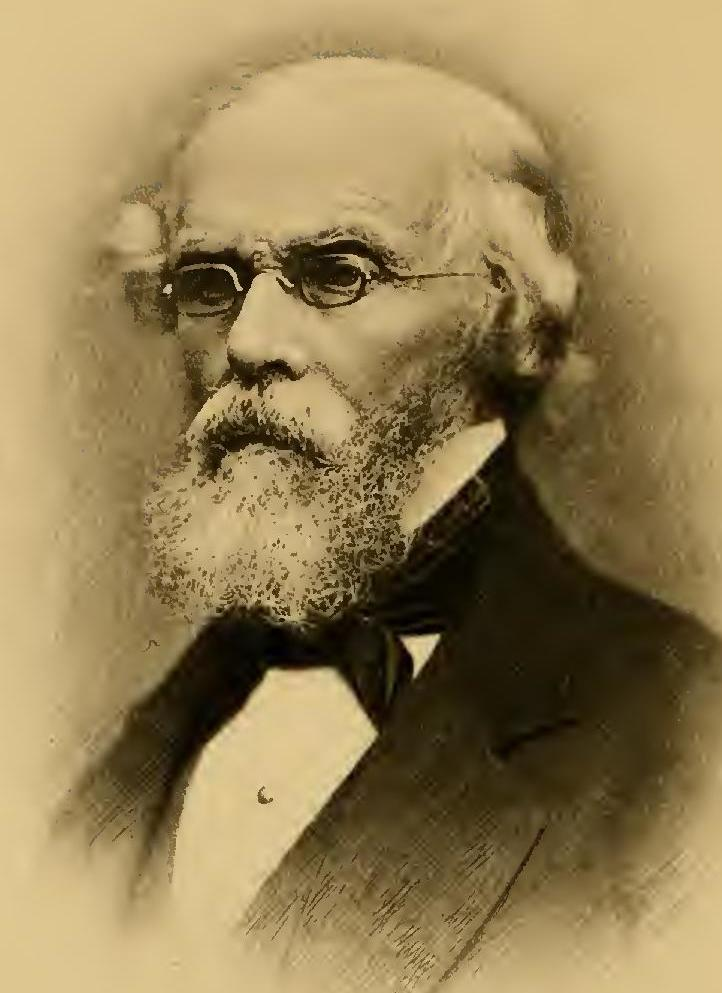
| Nominee | William B. Washburn | Francis W. Bird |
| Party | Republican | Liberal Republican |
| Alliance | | Democratic |
| Popular vote | 133,900 | 59,626 |
| Percentage | 69.10% | 30.77% |
- County results Washburn: 60–70% 70–80% 80–90% >90%
Governor before election
William B. Washburn
Republican
Elected Governor
William B. Washburn
Republican

The 1872 Massachusetts gubernatorial election was held on November 5, 1872. Republican governor William B. Washburn was re-elected to a second term in office over businessman Francis W. Bird, a Liberal Republican nominated with support of the Democratic Party.

== Republican nomination ==
=== Candidates ===
- Benjamin Butler, U.S. representative from Lowell and candidate for governor in 1871
- William B. Washburn, incumbent governor

=== Convention ===
With an incumbent seeking re-election, the Republican convention was far less contentious than the open race of 1871. Nevertheless, supporters of Benjamin F. Butler placed his name in opposition to Washburn and a vote was taken.

1872 Massachusetts Republican Convention
| Party | Candidate | Votes | % |
|---|---|---|---|
| Republican | William B. Washburn (incumbent) | 563 | 67.10% |
| Republican | Benjamin Butler | 259 | 30.87% |
| Republican | Scattering | 17 | 2.03% |
| Total votes | | 839 | 100.00% |

Washburn's renomination was then made unanimous. A subsequent inquiry found that Butler's totals were inflated by "ballot-stuffing and other improper devices." In the only other contested race, Thomas Talbot defeated Elijah B. Stoddard by 643 to 395 for lieutenant governor.

== General election ==
=== Results ===
1872 Massachusetts gubernatorial election
| Party | Candidate | Votes | % | ±% |
|---|---|---|---|---|
| Republican | William B. Washburn (incumbent) | 133,900 | 69.10% | ▲14.18 |
| Liberal Republican | Francis W. Bird | 59,626 | 30.77% | N/A |
| Write-in | | 254 | 0.13% | ▼0.12 |
| Total votes | | 193,780 | 100.00% | |

== See also ==
- 1872 Massachusetts legislature
