= 1856 Boston mayoral election =

Election in Massachusetts, United States

- December 8, 1856
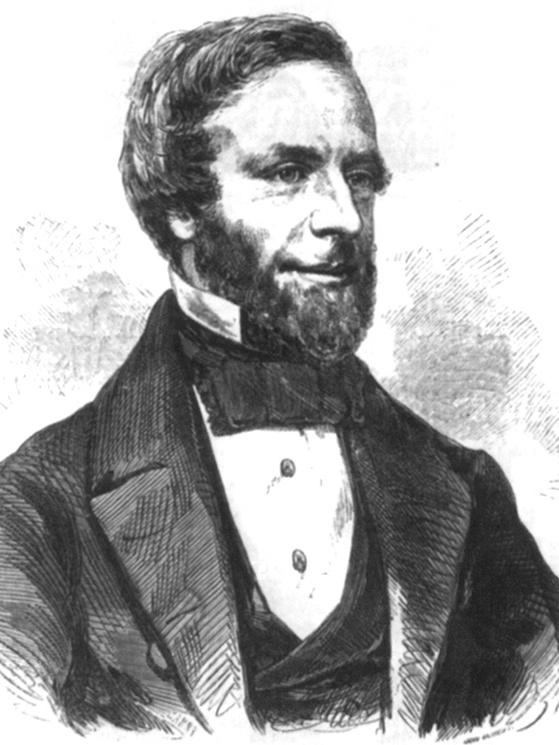

Candidate	Alexander H. Rice	Jonathan Preston
Party	Citizens	Know Nothing
Alliance		Republican
Popular vote	8,714	2,025
Percentage	80.92%	18.80%
Mayor before election
Alexander H. Rice
Independent
Elected mayor
Alexander H. Rice
Independent

The Boston mayoral election of 1856 saw the reelection of Alexander H. Rice. It was held on December 8, 1856.

Rice was running on the "Citizen's" slate, which performed very well in the coinciding City Council elections as well. His opponent, Jonathan Preston, was the nominee of the "American Party" (Know Nothings) and the Republican Party.

== Results ==
1856 Boston mayoral election
Party	Candidate	Votes	%
Citizens	Alexander H. Rice (incumbent)	8,714	80.92
Know Nothing	Jonathan Preston	2,025	18.80
Other	Scattering	30	0.28
Turnout		10,769	

== See also ==
- List of mayors of Boston, Massachusetts
