= George Lewis (politician) =

American politician

9th Mayor of Roxbury, Massachusetts
- In office January 5, 1863 – January 5, 1868
- Preceded by: William Gaston
- Succeeded by: None - Office Abolished

Personal details
- Born: May 25, 1820 Roxbury, Massachusetts
- Died: October 9, 1887 Boston, Massachusetts

George Lewis (1820-1887) was an American politician who served as the ninth and final mayor of Roxbury, Massachusetts, from 1863 to 1867. Lewis was born in Roxbury to Eliajh Lewis and Elizabeth Sumner (Doggetrt) Lewis.

Lewis was first elected mayor in the election of December 8, 1862. He defeated his opponent S. U. Williams by about 300 votes. Pursuant to Roxbury city charter, Lewis was sworn into office on the first Monday of the new year, January 5, 1863. Lewis was mayor until the City of Roxbury was formerly annexed by the City of Boston on January 5, 1867.

== Bibliography ==
- A Catalogue of the City Councils of Boston, 1822–1908, Roxbury, 1846–1867, Charlestown 1847-1873 and of The Selectmen of Boston, 1634-1822 also of Various Other Town and Municipal officers, Boston, MA: City of Boston Printing Department, 1909, p. 327.
- The Memorial History of Boston: Including Suffolk County, Massachusetts. 1630-1880. Justin Winsor (1881).

Political offices
Preceded by William Gaston	Mayor of Roxbury, Massachusetts; 1863-1867	Succeeded by None - Office Abolished
