= 1875 Massachusetts gubernatorial election =

State election in the United States

- November 2, 1875
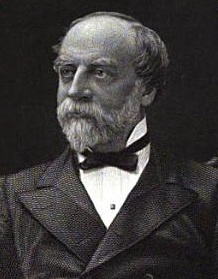

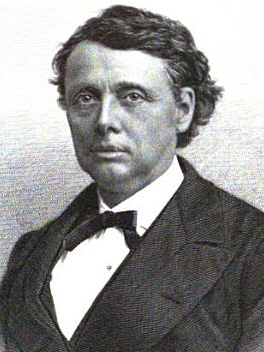

Nominee	Alexander H. Rice	William Gaston	John I. Baker
Party	Republican	Democratic	Temperance
Popular vote	83,639	78,333	9,124
Percentage	48.30%	45.23%	5.27%
- Rice: 30-40% 40-50% 50–60% 60–70% 70–80% 80–90% >90% Gaston: 30-40% 40-50% 50–60% 60–70% 70–80% 80–90% Baker: 40-50% Tie: 30-40% 40-50%
Governor before election
William Gaston
Democratic
Elected Governor
Alexander H. Rice
Republican

The 1875 Massachusetts gubernatorial election was held on November 2, 1875. Incumbent Democratic governor William Gaston ran for re-election to a second term in office, but was defeated by Republican Alexander H. Rice, a former U.S. representative and mayor of Boston.

== General election ==
=== Results ===
1875 Massachusetts gubernatorial election
Party	Candidate	Votes	%	±%
Republican	Alexander H. Rice	83,639	48.30%	▲0.26
Democratic	William Gaston (incumbent)	78,333	45.23%	▼6.59
Prohibition	John I. Baker	9,124	5.27%	N/A
Independent	Charles Francis Adams Sr.	1,497	0.86%	N/A
Labor Reform	Wendell Phillips	316	0.18%	N/A
Write-in	All others	276	0.16%	▲0.01
Total votes		173,185	100.00%	

== See also ==
- 1875 Massachusetts legislature
