= 1870 Boston mayoral election =

Election in Massachusetts, United States

- December 12, 1870
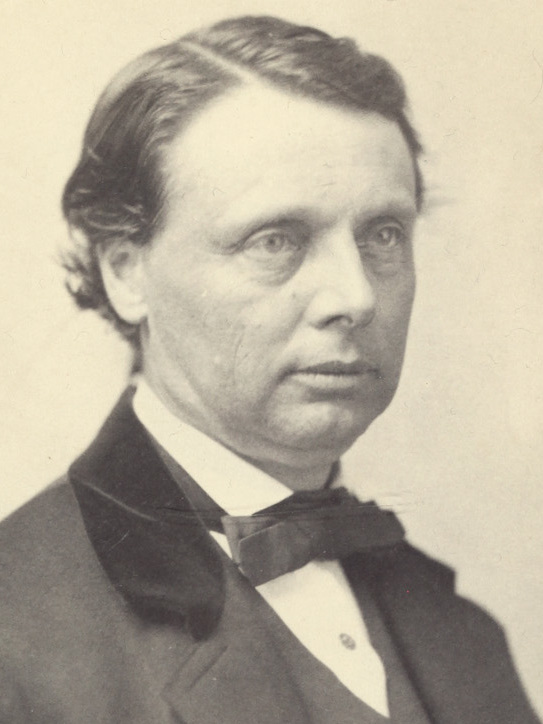

Candidate	William Gaston	George O. Carpenter
Party	Democratic	Republican
Popular vote	10,836	7,836
Percentage	57.64%	41.68%
Mayor before election
Nathaniel B. Shurtleff
Democratic
Elected mayor
William Gaston
Democratic

The Boston mayoral election of 1870 saw the election of Democratic Party nominee William Gaston over Republican Party nominee George O. Carpenter.

== Nominees ==
At the end of November, William Gaston (the former mayor of Roxbury, Massachusetts and a former Democratic state senator) was nominated by a citizen's committee organized by the city's Democratic Party organization. Gaston had, the month prior, unsuccessfully ran for United States Congress as a Democratic nominee in Massachusetts's third congressional district.

George O. Carpenter (a Boston alderman) was formally made the Republican nominee at a citizens meeting held at Faneuil Hall on December 7.

Ahead of the election, the Boston Evening Transcript and others regarded Gaston to be the front-runner Many Republicans organized in citizens committees that instead backed the candidacy of Gaston. Carpenter suffered from a public image that associated him with political corruption during his time as an alderman. Meanwhile, Gaston's past tenure as mayor of Roxbury was well-regarded.

== Results ==
1870 Boston mayoral election
Party	Candidate	Votes	%
Democratic	William Gaston	10,836	57.64
Republican	George O. Carpenter	7,836	41.68
Others	Scattering	127	0.68
Turnout		18,799	

== See also ==
- List of mayors of Boston, Massachusetts
