= 1873 Massachusetts gubernatorial election =

- November 4, 1873
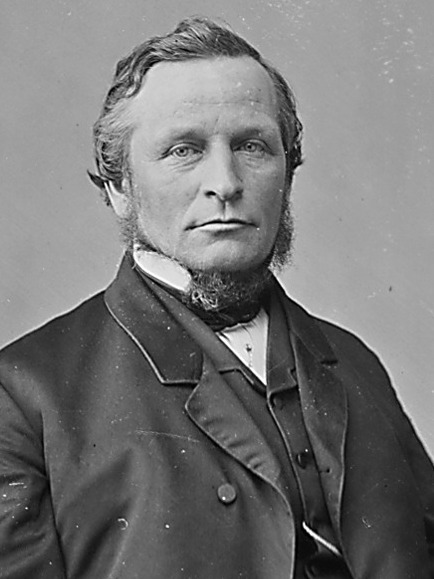

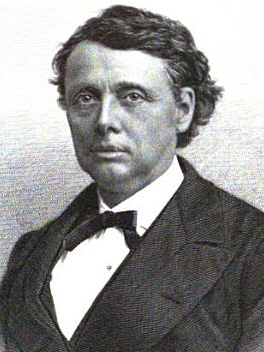
Nominee	William B. Washburn	William Gaston
Party	Republican	Democratic
Popular vote	72,183	59,360
Percentage	54.55%	44.86%
- County results Washburn: 50–60% 60–70% 70–80% 80–90% Gaston: 50–60%
Governor before election
William B. Washburn
Republican
Elected Governor
William B. Washburn
Republican

The 1873 Massachusetts gubernatorial election was held on November 4, 1873. Republican Governor William B. Washburn was re-elected to a third term in office over Democrat William Gaston.

== General election ==
=== Candidates ===
- Nathaniel Bartlett (Independent)
- Benjamin Butler, U.S. representative from Lowell (Independent)
- William Gaston, former mayor of Boston (Democratic)
- Henry K. Oliver, former treasurer and receiver-general and mayor of Lawrence (Independent)
- William B. Washburn, incumbent governor (Republican)

=== Results ===
1873 Massachusetts gubernatorial election
Party	Candidate	Votes	%	±%
Republican	William B. Washburn (incumbent)	96,376	51.82%	▼14.55
Democratic	William Gaston	59,360	44.86%	▲14.09
Independent	Henry K. Oliver	391	0.30%	N/A
Independent	Benjamin F. Butler	181	0.14%	N/A
Independent	Nathaniel Bartlett	113	0.09%	N/A
Write-in	All others	105	0.08%	▼0.05
Total votes		132,333	100.00%	

== See also ==
- 1873 Massachusetts legislature
