= Law Telegraph Company =

- Industry: Telecommunications
- Founded: April 10, 1875; 150 years ago
- Founder: William A. Childs
- Defunct: 1884
- Fate: Bought by Metropolitan Telephone and Telegraph Company
- Headquarters: New York City, New York, United States

The Law Telegraph Company was an American company engaged in facilitating communications between lawyers in New York City. It was the first company to provide telephone services in the city.

In early 1874, William A. Childs proposed to establish a ticker system for lawyers similar to the one provided for stock quotations. His service would connect the lawyers with various courts so they could determine the court calendars for each day, the decisions of the judges, and other court news. On soliciting the ideas of the lawyers who would be his customers, he found no interest, as this information was already available in daily newspapers, but the lawyers instead wanted a system where they could connect with each other to communicate; if a system was provided whereby a lawyer could communicate with any other lawyer who was also on the system, this would be useful, according to one of the lawyers consulted by Childs. Thus was born the Law Telegraph Company.

Based on the suggestions made by these lawyers, Childs conceived of a system where there would be a central office and a signaling system where any lawyer could signal to that office to connect his wire to a specified office, using a device similar to Charles Wheatstone's "A B C instrument". The service was advertised to local lawyers and sold out very quickly. Childs's firm set up 60 bells in a central room; each lawyer had a number assigned and would signal to the operator the number the lawyer wanted to reach by ringing the bell (for example, 3 rings followed by 1 to reach "31"). The bell was later replaced by a Morse telegraph sounder.

By April 10, 1875, the system was operating, and sufficiently well-acclaimed that The Telegrapher, an industry publication, referred to the Law Telegraph system.

Although Alexander Graham Bell had described ideas for a central exchange system, the Law Telegraph Company applied telephones to the exchange set-up before Bell had one of his own, and thus preceded Bell in New York City with a functioning telephone exchange. The Law System was awarded a patent, No. 220,874 (to Frank Shaw), for the adaptation of the call-wire principle (used previously for telegraphy) to telephones, on October 21, 1879. In the patent application, Shaw also pointed out the advantage of assigning telephone numbers to subscribers, rather than identifying them by name, as had earlier been done, though the Law Telegraph Company may not have been the first to use numbers.

For a time there were three telephone companies operating in New York City: the Gold and Stock Telegraph Company (controlled by Western Union), the Bell Telephone Company of New York, and the Law Company. When the courts caused Western Union to give up the telephone business and the first two companies consequently merged (under the name of the Metropolitan Telephone and Telegraph Company), the Law Telegraph Company became the sole independent company in New York City, though subscribers on its exchange were able to communicate with the Metropolitan Company. Under an agreement with Bell, it was limited to six hundred subscribers, and continued until 1884, when it was bought out by Metropolitan, and its exchange became one of a number of separate exchanges of the Metropolitan Company.
