= Joseph Weil =

American fraudster (1875–1976)

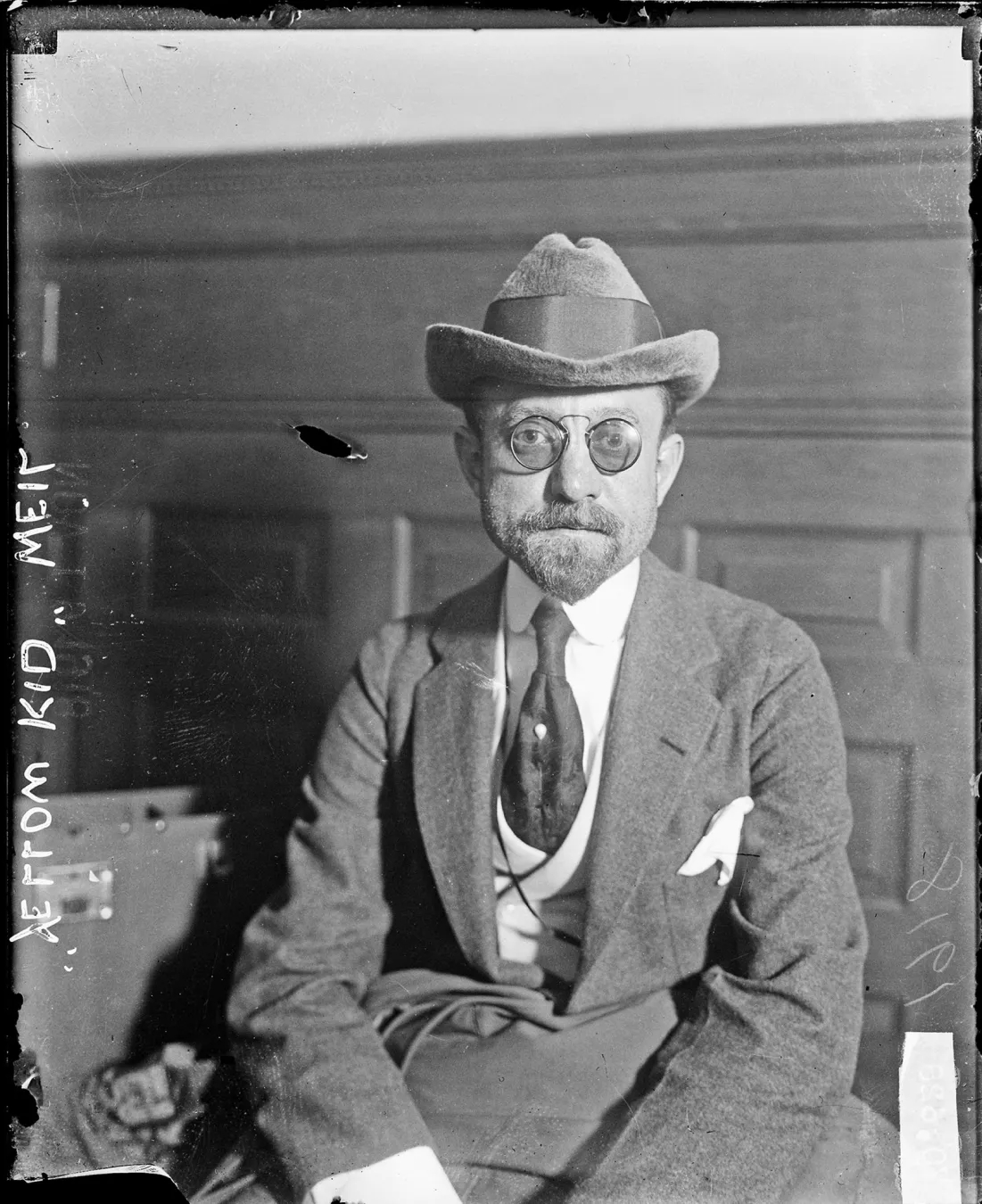
- Weil in 1918
- Born: July 1, 1875; Chicago, Illinois, US
- Died: February 26, 1976 (aged 100); Chicago, Illinois, US
- Other names: Yellow Kid
- Known for: Notorious con artist

Joseph "Yellow Kid" Weil (July 1, 1875 – February 26, 1976) was one of the best known American con men of his era. Weil's biographer, W. T. Brannon, wrote of Weil's "uncanny knowledge of human nature". During the course of his career, Weil is reputed to have stolen more than $8 million.

"Each of my victims had larceny in his heart," quipped Weil.

== Early life and career ==
Weil was born in Chicago, the son of Mr. and Mrs. Otto Weil. He quit school and started work as a collector in his home town's bustling loan-sharking industry at age 17. Weil noticed his peers keeping small portions of the boss' proceeds. For a portion, offered Weil, he would not share his knowledge of their perfidy. Plenty complied. His career progressed into protection rackets.

Under the tutelage of Chicago confidence man Doc Meriwether, Weil started performing brief cons during the 1890s at public sales of Meriwether's Elixir, the chief ingredient of which was rainwater.

== Life as a con man ==
The nickname "Yellow Kid" first was applied during 1903 and was derived from the comic "Hogan's Alley and the Yellow Kid." After working for some time with a grifter named Frank Hogan, Chicago alderman "Bathhouse John" Coughlin associated the pair with the comic: Hogan was Hogan, and Weil became the Yellow Kid. "There have been many erroneous stories published about how I acquired this cognomen", Weil writes in his autobiography. "It was said that it was due to my having worn yellow chamois gloves, yellow vests, yellow spats, and a yellow beard. All this was untrue. I had never affected such wearing apparel and I had no beard".

During his career, Weil worked with, among others, con men Doc Meriwether, Billy Wall, William J. Winterbill, Bob Collins, Colonel Jim Porter, Romeo Simpson, "Fats" Levine, Jack Mason, Tim North, and George Gross.

"The desire to get something for nothing has been very costly to many people who have dealt with me and with other con men", Weil writes. "But I have found that this is the way it works. The average person, in my estimation, is ninety-nine per cent animal and one per cent human. The ninety-nine per cent that is animal causes very little trouble. But the one per cent that is human causes all our woes. When people learn—as I doubt they will—that they can't get something for nothing, crime will diminish and we shall live in greater harmony."

Some of Weil's successful cons include swindling the Italian dictator Benito Mussolini out of $2 million, staging fake prize fights, selling "talking" dogs, and selling oil-rich land that he did not own. Weil claimed to have swindled Andrew Mellon's brother out of $500,000 in a scam involving a silver mine in Colorado.

== Jail time ==
Weil spent a total of just six years in jail, some of it spent at Leavenworth Prison.

== Death ==
Weil died in Chicago, Illinois in 1976 at the age of 100.
