= William B. Washburn =

American businessman and politician

William Barrett Washburn
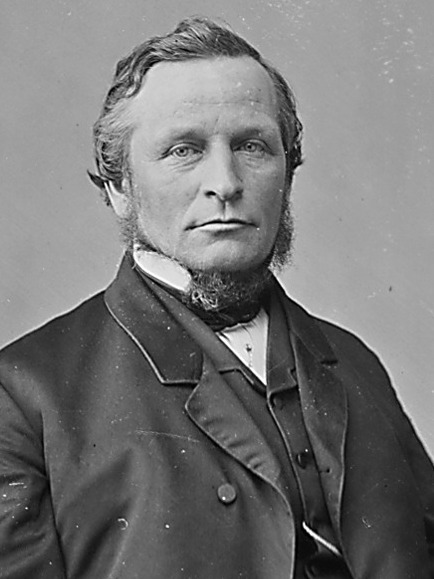
- Washburn in circa 1860–1865

United States Senator from Massachusetts
- In office April 17, 1874 – March 3, 1875
- Preceded by: Charles Sumner
- Succeeded by: Henry L. Dawes

28th Governor of Massachusetts
- In office January 4, 1872 – April 17, 1874
- Lieutenant: Joseph Tucker; Thomas Talbot
- Preceded by: William Claflin
- Succeeded by: Thomas Talbot as Acting Governor; William Gaston

Member of the U.S. House of Representatives from Massachusetts's 9th district
- In office March 4, 1863 – December 5, 1871
- Preceded by: Amasa Walker
- Succeeded by: Alvah Crocker

Member of the Massachusetts House of Representatives
- In office 1853–1855

Member of the Massachusetts Senate
- In office 1850

Personal details
- Born: January 31, 1820 Winchendon, Massachusetts, US
- Died: October 5, 1887 (aged 67) Springfield, Massachusetts, US
- Party: Republican
- Education: Yale College

William Barrett Washburn (January 31, 1820 – October 5, 1887) was an American businessman and politician from Massachusetts. Washburn served several terms in the United States House of Representatives (1863–71) and as the 28th governor of Massachusetts from 1872 to 1874, when he won election to the United States Senate in a special election to succeed the recently deceased Charles Sumner. A moderate Republican, Washburn only partially supported the Radical Republican agenda during the American Civil War and the Reconstruction Era that followed.

A Yale graduate, Washburn parlayed early business success in furniture manufacture into banking and railroads, based in the Connecticut River valley town of Greenfield. He was a major proponent of railroads in northern and western Massachusetts, sitting on the board of the Connecticut River Railroad for many years, and playing an oversight role in the construction of the Hoosac Tunnel. He has been described as a latter-day "Connecticut River God" because of his role as a leading regional businessman and politician.

== Early life ==
William Barrett Washburn was born on January 31, 1820, in Winchendon, Massachusetts, to Asa and Phoebe (Whitney) Washburn. His father was a hat maker from a family with deep colonial roots; Emory Washburn, who was governor of Massachusetts in 1854, was a distant cousin. Asa Washburn died in 1823.

Washburn was educated in the academies at Hancock and Westminster, and then attended Yale College, graduating in 1844. He was a member of the Skull and Bones Society. He was employed as a store clerk from 1844 to 1847 in the business of his uncle in Orange. He established a chair factory in Erving, operating it from 1847 to 1857 and parlaying a $10,000 ($350,000 in 2025 dollars) investment into a wood products business whose annual production exceeded $150,000 ($5,180,000). In 1849, he cofounded the Franklin County Trust Company, on whose board he sat until 1858. He moved to Greenfield in 1857, where he was elected president of the Greenfield Bank (later the First National Bank), a post he would hold for the rest of his life.

In 1847, Washburn married Hannah Sweetser of Athol; the couple had six children, with four surviving to adulthood.

== Political career ==
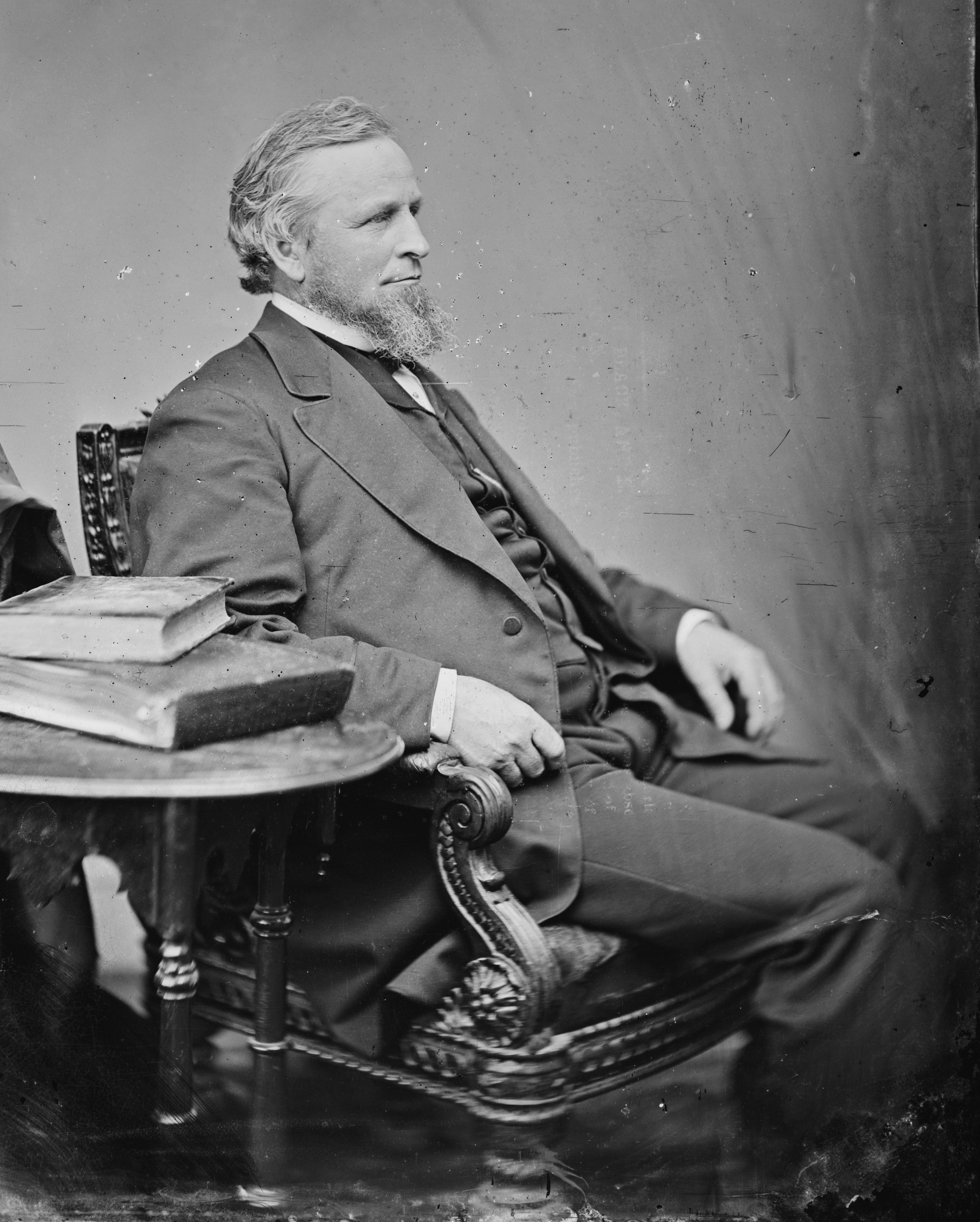
Photograph of Washburn

Washburn won election to the Massachusetts Senate in 1850 and served two years in the Massachusetts House of Representatives from 1853 to 1855. His elections to the state legislature were supported by proponents of the Hoosac Tunnel. In 1862, Washburn ran for Congress as a Republican, winning election to the 38th Congress against no opposition. He was reelected four times, winning each time by wide margins. He was viewed as relatively moderate, in comparison to the mostly Radical Republican Massachusetts delegation. He served as chairman of the Committee on Claims during the 41st Congress.

In 1871, Washburn ran for governor of Massachusetts. The Republican Party was then dominant in state politics, and a number of well-known politicians vied for the party nomination to replace outgoing Governor William Claflin. Most prominent was the former Congressman and American Civil War general Benjamin F. Butler, who was disliked by the fiscally conservative state Republican establishment over his support for the continued issuance of greenbacks (currency not backed by silver or gold), and who frequently used populist tactics to upset convention proceedings. Butler's opponents eventually united behind Washburn to give him the nomination, and he won the general election by a 13,000 vote margin over John Quincy Adams II and a labor candidate. He was reelected to further terms in 1872 and 1873, the former despite dissension in Republican ranks that had resulted in the splitting off of the Liberal Republican Party, who fielded Francis W. Bird. The 1873 convention was particularly affected by the actions of Butler supporters, but Washburn prevailed and was again comfortably reelected. Washburn's three victories over Butler in these conventions marked a low point in the latter's career.

The major event of 1872 during Washburn's tenure as governor was the Great Boston Fire of 1872, which destroyed 65 acres (26 ha) of prime commercial real estate in the city on November 9. The legislature was called into a special session to enable the provision of state assistance. Measures it passed included a bill simplifying the establishment of insurance companies, since several were bankrupted by the blaze, and a bill authorizing the city to issue bonds to speed the rebuilding effort. 1873 brought a new round of state funding in the amount of $200,000 to fund the final completion of the Hoosac Tunnel, a tightening of the state's alcohol prohibition laws, and the establishments of a new prison in Concord (now MCI Concord) and a mental hospital in Salem. In 1874, Washburn signed legislation establishing a women's reformatory. Although Washburn was a supporter of women's suffrage, the matter was not seriously considered by the legislature during his term. He also supported legislation reforming the state's child labor and education laws, which were widely flouted. He opposed enactment of a labor bill limiting work to ten hours per day, a subject of regular labor agitation during his tenure.

When United States Senator Charles Sumner died in March 1874, the state senate, which then chose the state's US senators, met to choose his replacement. After a long and contentious debate involving thirty-three ballots, Washburn was chosen to succeed Sumner as a compromise candidate acceptable to supporters of Henry L. Dawes and George F. Hoar. Washburn then resigned the governorship, leaving Lieutenant Governor Thomas Talbot as acting governor. Washburn served from April 17, 1874, until the term ended on March 3, 1875, and refused to run for reelection.

== Other activities ==
Not long after leaving the governorship, Washburn was appointed to a state commission established to investigate the finances and operations of the Hoosac Tunnel, whose construction, originally estimated at $2 million ($80,000,000), had instead cost over $14 million ($410,000,000) and the financing and involvement of the state to complete. This commission filed its report with the legislature in 1875.

Washburn served at various times as a trustee of Yale, the Massachusetts Agricultural College (now UMass Amherst), Amherst College, and Smith College, whose Washburn House he funded. Harvard University conferred a law degree upon him in 1872. He was a member of a number of missionary societies, which were major beneficiaries of his estate. He was a benefactor of the Greenfield Public Library, funding the construction of its first building and endowing it with funds.

Washburn died in Springfield, Massachusetts, on October 5, 1887, while attending a session of the American Board of Commissioners for Foreign Missions (ABCFM), of which he was a member. He was buried in Green River Cemetery in Greenfield.

== Notes ==
Party political offices
| Preceded by William Claflin | Republican nominee for Governor of Massachusetts; 1871, 1872, 1873 | Succeeded by Thomas Talbot |
U.S. House of Representatives
| Preceded by Amasa Walker | Member of the U.S. House of Representatives from Massachusetts's 9th congressional district March 4, 1863 – December 5, 1871 | Succeeded by Alvah Crocker |
Political offices
| Preceded by William Claflin | Governor of Massachusetts; January 4, 1872 – April 29, 1874 | Succeeded by Thomas Talbot as Acting Governor |
U.S. Senate
| Preceded by Charles Sumner | U.S. senator (Class 1) from Massachusetts; April 17, 1874 – March 3, 1875; Served alongside: George S. Boutwell | Succeeded by Henry L. Dawes |
