= Horatio G. Knight =

American politician

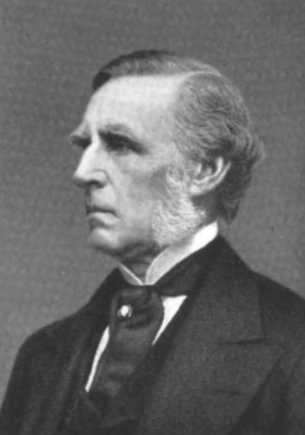

30th Lieutenant Governor of Massachusetts
- In office January 7, 1875 – January 2, 1879
- Governor: William Gaston; Alexander H. Rice
- Preceded by: Thomas Talbot
- Succeeded by: John Davis Long

Personal details
- Born: March 24, 1818; Easthampton, Massachusetts
- Died: October 16, 1895 (aged 77); Northampton, Massachusetts
- Political party: Republican
- Spouse: Mary Ann Huntoon (m. 1841)
- Profession: Lieutenant Governor

Horatio Gates Knight (March 24, 1818 – October 16, 1895) was an American politician, manufacturer and philanthropist who served as the 30th lieutenant governor of Massachusetts from 1875 to 1879. Knight was part owner and president of a leading button manufacturer in his native Easthampton, Massachusetts.

== Life ==
Horatio Knight was born in Easthampton, Massachusetts to Sylvester and Rachel (Lyman) Knight. He was educated in the local public schools, as well as by private tutors. At fourteen Knight was apprenticed into the retail establishment of Samuel Williston, whose principal business in Easthampton was the manufacture of buttons. Knight rose within Williston's businesses, becoming a full partner at age 24 and eventually president of the Williston and Knight Company. He also served as director of several area banks, as well as on the boards of area educational institutions and charities.

Knight's political career began with election to the Massachusetts House of Representatives in 1852 as a Whig, serving two terms. He next served two terms as state senator in 1858 and 1859, having joined the new Republican Party. During the American Civil War he was tapped by Governor John Andrew as the military draft commissioner for Hampshire County. In this role he relied on enlistments to fill the county's quotas for war duty, spending some of his fortune in the recruitment effort. In 1868 he was elected to the Massachusetts Governor's Council, where he served two terms. In 1874 he was nominated by the party to be its candidate for lieutenant governor, and served for terms under Democrat William Gaston and Republican Alexander H. Rice.

Knight married Mary Ann Huntoon in 1841; the couple had seven children, of which two died in infancy. He is the first cousin of Vinson Knight (an early leader in the Church of Jesus Christ of Latter-day Saints).

Horatio G. Knight died in Northampton, Massachusetts on October 16, 1895.

== See also ==
- 80th Massachusetts General Court (1859)

Political offices
Preceded by Thomas Talbot	Lieutenant Governor of Massachusetts; 1875 – 1879	Succeeded by John Davis Long
