= Alexander H. Rice =

American politician (1818–1895)

Alexander Hamilton Rice
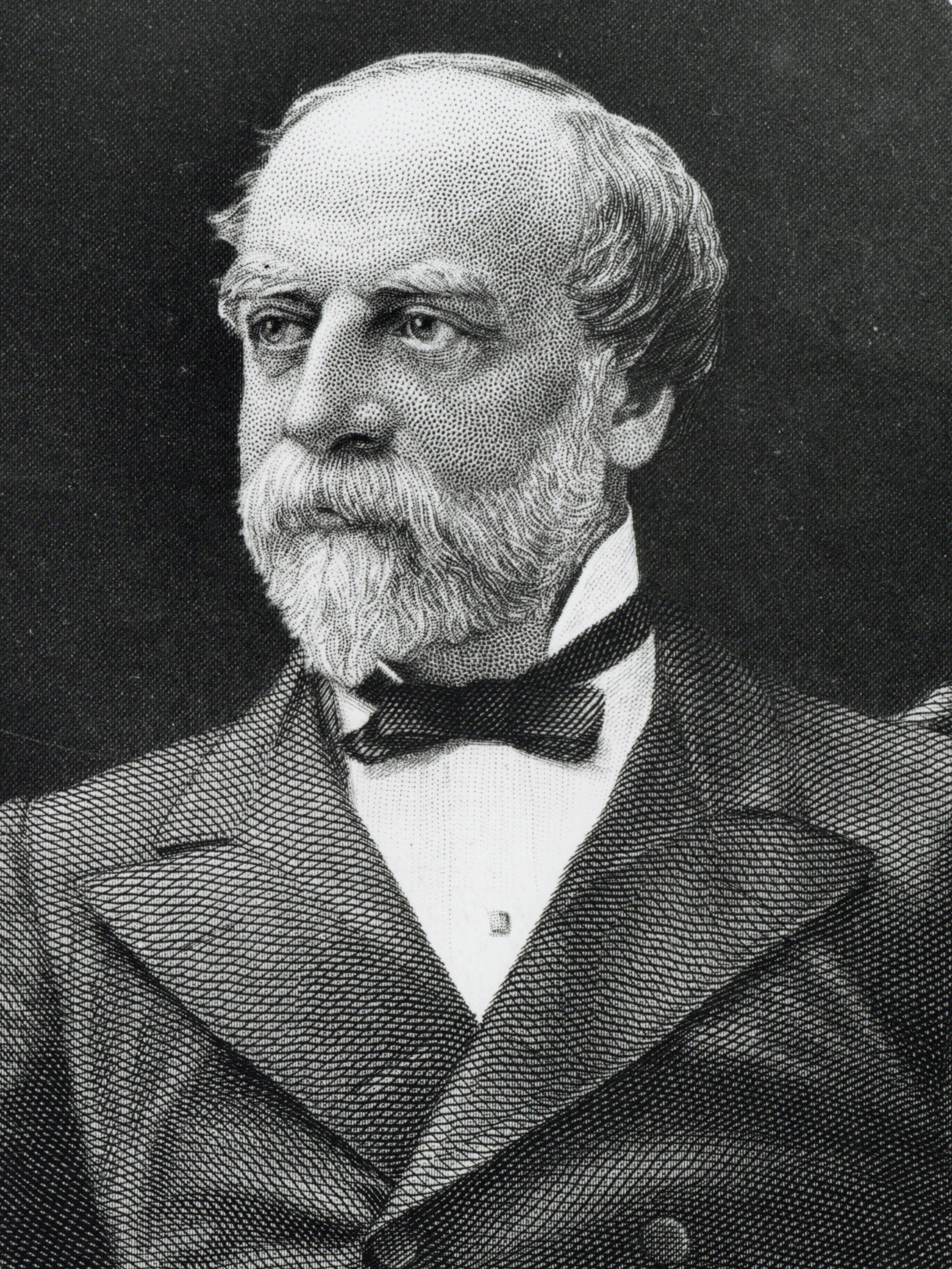

30th Governor of Massachusetts
- In office January 6, 1876 – January 2, 1879
- Lieutenant: Horatio G. Knight
- Preceded by: William Gaston
- Succeeded by: Thomas Talbot

Member of the U.S. House of Representatives from Massachusetts
- In office March 4, 1859 – March 4, 1867
- Preceded by: Linus B. Comins
- Succeeded by: Ginery Twichell
- Constituency: 4th district (1859–1863); 3rd district (1863–1867)

Mayor of Boston
- In office 1856–1858
- Preceded by: Jerome V.C. Smith
- Succeeded by: Frederic W. Lincoln Jr.

President of the Boston School Committee
- In office 1854

President of the Boston Common Council
- In office 1854
- Preceded by: Henry Gardner
- Succeeded by: Joseph Story

Member of the Boston Common Council from Ward 11
- In office 1853–1854

Personal details
- Born: August 30, 1818 Newton, Massachusetts, US
- Died: July 22, 1895 (aged 76) Melrose, Massachusetts, US
- Party: Republican
- Spouse(s): Augusta E. McKim (d. 1868); Angle Erickson Powell

Alexander Hamilton Rice (August 30, 1818 – July 22, 1895) was an American politician and businessman from Massachusetts. He served as Mayor of Boston from 1856 to 1857, a U.S. congressman during the American Civil War, and as the 30th governor of Massachusetts from 1876 to 1879. He was part owner and president of Rice-Kendall, one of the nation's largest paper products distributors.

Educated at Union College, Rice was for many years involved in the paper business, and entered Boston politics in 1853. As mayor, he helped broker an agreement that began development of its Back Bay area. His Congressional service included the introduction of the failed Crittenden Compromise, oversight of naval affairs during the Civil War, and resistance to Radical Republican actions. As governor, he promoted social reform legislation and reductions in working hours.

== Early years ==
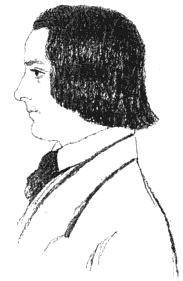
Portrait of Rice as a boy

Alexander Hamilton Rice was born in Newton Lower Falls, Massachusetts, to Thomas and Lydia (Smith) Rice, on August 30, 1818. His father, a Brighton native, owned a paper manufacturing business in Newton, and both parents had deep colonial roots. His uncle Charles was a brigadier general in the Massachusetts state militia and also served as a state legislator.

Rice was first educated in the Newton public schools, and then at private schools in Needham and Newton. He first clerked at a Boston dry goods store, and then apprenticed in the Boston paper distributor Wilkins, Carter, and Company in Boston. In 1840 he entered Union College in Schenectady, New York, graduating as class valedictorian in 1844. He was injured in a fall from a horse in 1844, which disfigured his face and gave him a speech impediment. This prompted him to give up thoughts of pursuing a career in law, and he instead focused on business. He was eventually able to overcome his speech problems, and later became well known as a commanding speaker.

== Business interests ==
After his graduation, Rice entered into partnership with the proprietors of Wilkins, Carter, forming what eventually became known as the Rice-Kendall Company. The firm owned a large warehouse in Boston and was one of the leading paper distributors in the city. The warehouse was destroyed in the Great Boston Fire of 1872, but this did not significantly damage the business. The company owned several paper mills in New England and distributed paper products to newspaper and book publishers nationwide. Rice also invested in paper manufacturing operations, serving as president of both the Keith Paper Company in Turners Falls, Massachusetts and the American Sulphite Pulp Company.

== Early political career ==
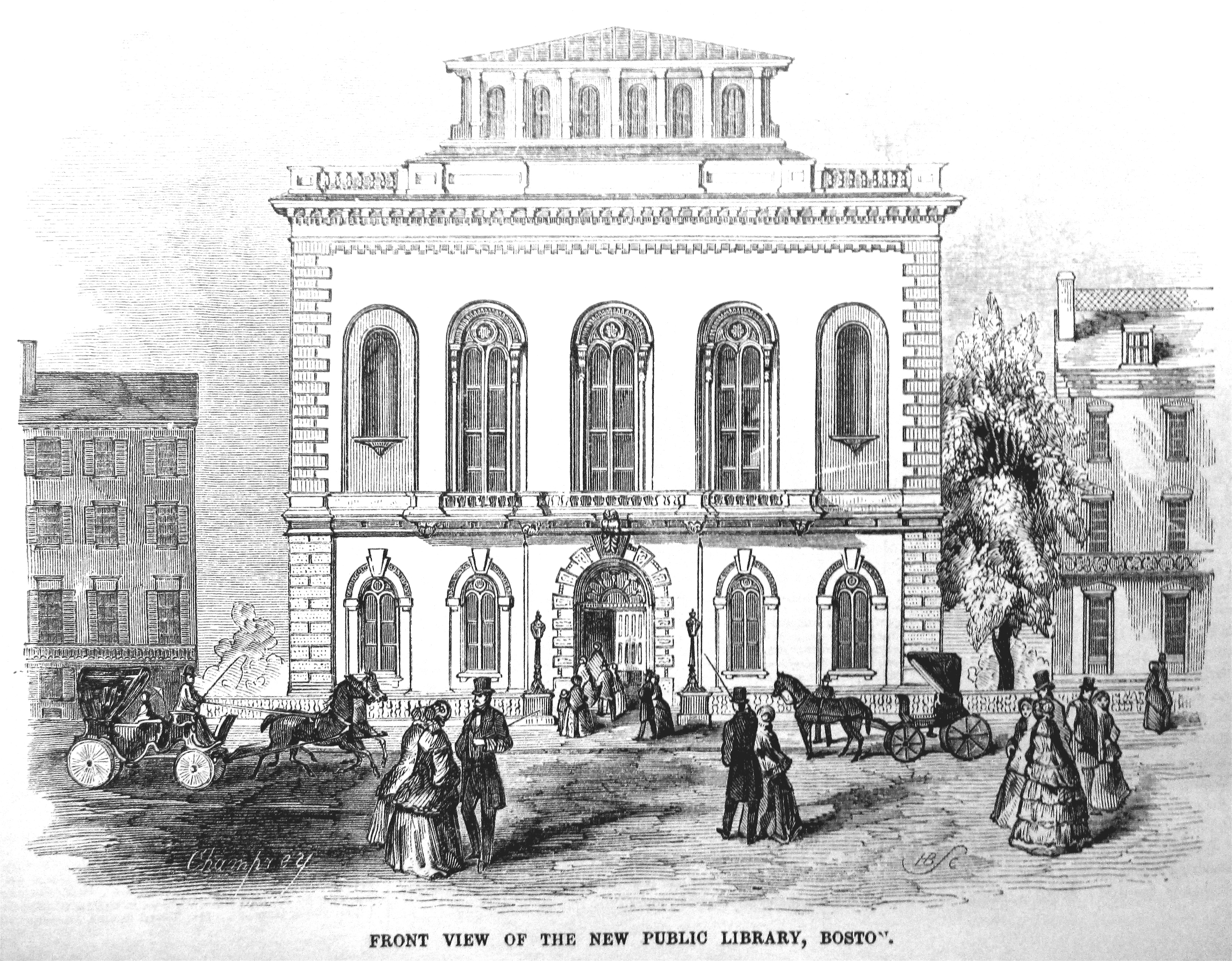
The 1858 Boston Public Library building, constructed during Rice's tenure as Mayor of Boston

In 1853, Rice entered local politics, winning election to the Boston City Council, representing the eleventh ward. He served for two years, and in 1854 was also the council president. In 1854, he also served as president of the Boston School Committee. Rice was elected mayor of Boston in 1856 (as a "Citizens" candidate opposed to the Know Nothings), and served two one-year terms. During his tenure, an agreement was reached between the city, state and owners of a tidal waterworks concerning development of the Back Bay, then a smelly swamp laden with trash and sewage. The agreement authorized the construction of what is now Arlington Street, and specifically set aside as parkland the area between it and Charles Street, which is now the Boston Public Garden. He later sat on the committees responsible for the commissioning and installation of the statues of George Washington and Charles Sumner in the Public Garden. He also authorized construction of the city's first hospital, and repurposed the city's almshouse on Deer Island for use as an insane asylum and workhouse, the state having taken over care of the indigent.

Rice participated in the founding of the Republican Party in Massachusetts. He was elected to the U.S. House of Representatives in 1858, and served four terms, from 1859 to 1867. He was chairman of the Committee on Naval Affairs from 1863 to 1865. He was a conservative Republican, opposed to Radical Republican positions on the abolition of slavery, and was considered by labor interests to favor positions of the "moneyed class". He introduced the Crittenden Compromise to the House in January 1861; his speech on this last-ditch attempt to prevent civil war received a lukewarm reception. After the war, he was elected as a Third Class Companion of the Military Order of the Loyal Legion of the United States in recognition of his support for the Union.

== Governor of Massachusetts ==
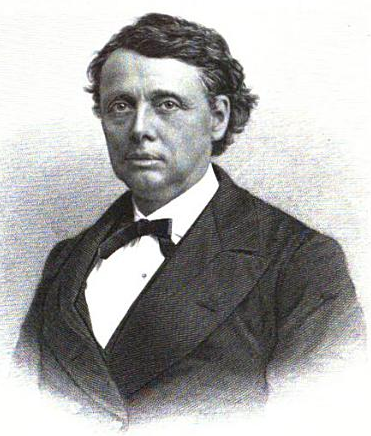
William Gaston, engraved portrait published 1895

Rice refused to stand for reelection, and then left politics for a time, devoting himself to his business interests. In 1872, after the Boston fire, he served on a relief committee that assisted in dealing with its aftermath. In 1871, Rice was one of a number of contenders for the Republican nomination for Governor of Massachusetts, a contest which was dominated by Benjamin Butler and won by William B. Washburn. In 1875, he won the nomination, and defeated incumbent Democrat William Gaston in the general election. He served three one-year terms before retiring from politics for good.

Legislation enacted during Rice's tenure included a child labor law mandating a minimum age of fourteen for factory work. He generally supported legislation improving social conditions, but was unsuccessful in enacting a proposed reorganization of the state's major charities. He also let stand the state's "local option" alcohol law, for which he was criticized by temperance activists. He also chaired a committee formed in 1876 to oversee the rescue from demolition of the historic Old South Meeting House. As a result of the committee's work, ownership of the building was passed to a nonprofit dedicated to its preservation.

One issue that had dominated Rice's race against Gaston in 1875 concerned the juvenile murderer Jesse Pomeroy. Pomeroy, then fourteen years old, had been convicted in December 1874 of first degree murder for killing a girl earlier that year, and had been sentenced to death. There was public clamor favoring his execution, especially after he attempted to escape from prison. Gaston, despite two rulings by the Governor's Council that clemency be denied, refused to sign the execution order, an unpopular move that probably cost him votes. Rice also refused to sign the execution order, but his Council eventually recommended commutation of Pomeroy's sentence to life in solitary confinement.

Rice died at the Langwood Hotel in Melrose, Massachusetts, on July 22, 1895, after a lengthy illness. He was buried at Newton Cemetery.

== Family relations and legacy ==
Rice was married twice. In 1845, he married Augusta McKim, with whom he had three children before her death in 1868. He had one son by his second wife, Angie Erickson Powell of Rochester, New York. His grandson Alexander Hamilton Rice was a physician and explorer in South America.

The city of Boston named a school in Rice's honor in 1868. Later renamed the Rice-Bancroft School, the building, located at Dartmouth and Appleton Streets in Boston's South End, now houses residential condominiums.

== See also ==
- Timeline of Boston, 1850s

== Sources ==
- The American Stationer. New York: Redman & Kenny. 1895. OCLC 9834610.
- Carnegie, Andrew (1994) [1895]. Success And How To Attain It. New York: Cosimo Classics. ISBN 9781596050105. OCLC 74942959.
- Conwell, Russell (1873). History of the Great Fire of Boston, November 9 and 10, 1872. Boston: RDS Tyler. OCLC 899768.
- Fullerton, Bradford (1908). "Alexander Hamilton Rice". Memorial Biographies of the New England Historic Genealogical Society: 1890–1897. Boston: New England Historic Genealogical Society. OCLC 13918119.
- Halloran, Michael (2001) [1998]. Boston's "changeful times" : origins of preservation & planning in America. Baltimore: Johns Hopkins University Press. ISBN 9780801866449. OCLC 298104996.
- Koren, John (1922). Boston, 1822 to 1922: The Story of Its Government and Principal Activities During One Hundred Years. Boston: City of Boston. OCLC 4423132.
- Mallam, William (February 1962). "Lincoln and the Conservatives". The Journal of Southern History. 28 (1): 31–45. doi:10.2307/2205531. JSTOR 2205531.
- McClintock, Russell (2008). Lincoln and the Decision for War: The Northern Response to Secession. Chapel Hill, NC: University of North Carolina Press. ISBN 9780807886328. OCLC 233572740.
- Montgomery, David (1981). Beyond Equality: labor and the radical republicans 1862-1872; with a bibliographical afterword. Urbana, IL: University of Illinois Press. ISBN 9780252008696. OCLC 256374336.
- Moody, Robert E (1928). "Rice, Alexander". Dictionary of American Biography. Vol. 15. New York: Scribners. pp. 534–535. OCLC 37255176.
- Roe, Alfred (January 1902). "The Governors of Massachusetts". The New England Magazine. 25 (6). OCLC 1644447.
- Sammarco, Anthony (2005). Boston's South End. Charleston, SC: Arcadia Press. ISBN 9780738539492. OCLC 67511287.
- Schechter, Harold (2012) [2000]. Fiend: The Schocking True Story of America's Youngest Serial Killer. New York: Simon & Schuster. ISBN 9780671014483. OCLC 46847410.
- Sweetser, Moses (1891). King's Handbook of the United States. Buffalo, NY: Moses King Corp. OCLC 484912.
- Toomey, Daniel; Quinn, Charles Thomas (1892). Massachusetts of Today: A Memorial of the State, Historical and Biographical, Issued for the World's Columbian Exposition at Chicago. Boston: Columbia Publishing Company. OCLC 3251791.
- Ware, Edith (1916). Political opinion in Massachusetts during Civil War and Reconstruction. New York: Columbia University Press. ISBN 9780722283448. OCLC 2502677.

Party political offices
| Preceded by Thomas Talbot | Republican nominee for Governor of Massachusetts; 1875, 1876, 1877 | Succeeded by Thomas Talbot |
Political offices
| Preceded by Jerome V. C. Smith | Mayor of Boston, Massachusetts; 1856–1857 | Succeeded by Frederic W. Lincoln Jr. |
| Preceded by William Gaston | Governor of Massachusetts; January 6, 1876 – January 2, 1879 | Succeeded by Thomas Talbot |
U.S. House of Representatives
| Preceded by Linus B. Comins | Member of the U.S. House of Representatives from Massachusetts's 4th congressional district March 4, 1859 – March 3, 1863 | Succeeded by Samuel Hooper |
| Preceded by Benjamin Thomas | Member of the U.S. House of Representatives from Massachusetts's 3rd congressional district March 4, 1863 – March 3, 1867 | Succeeded by Ginery Twichell |
