= Thomas Talbot (Massachusetts politician) =

American politician and textile businessman

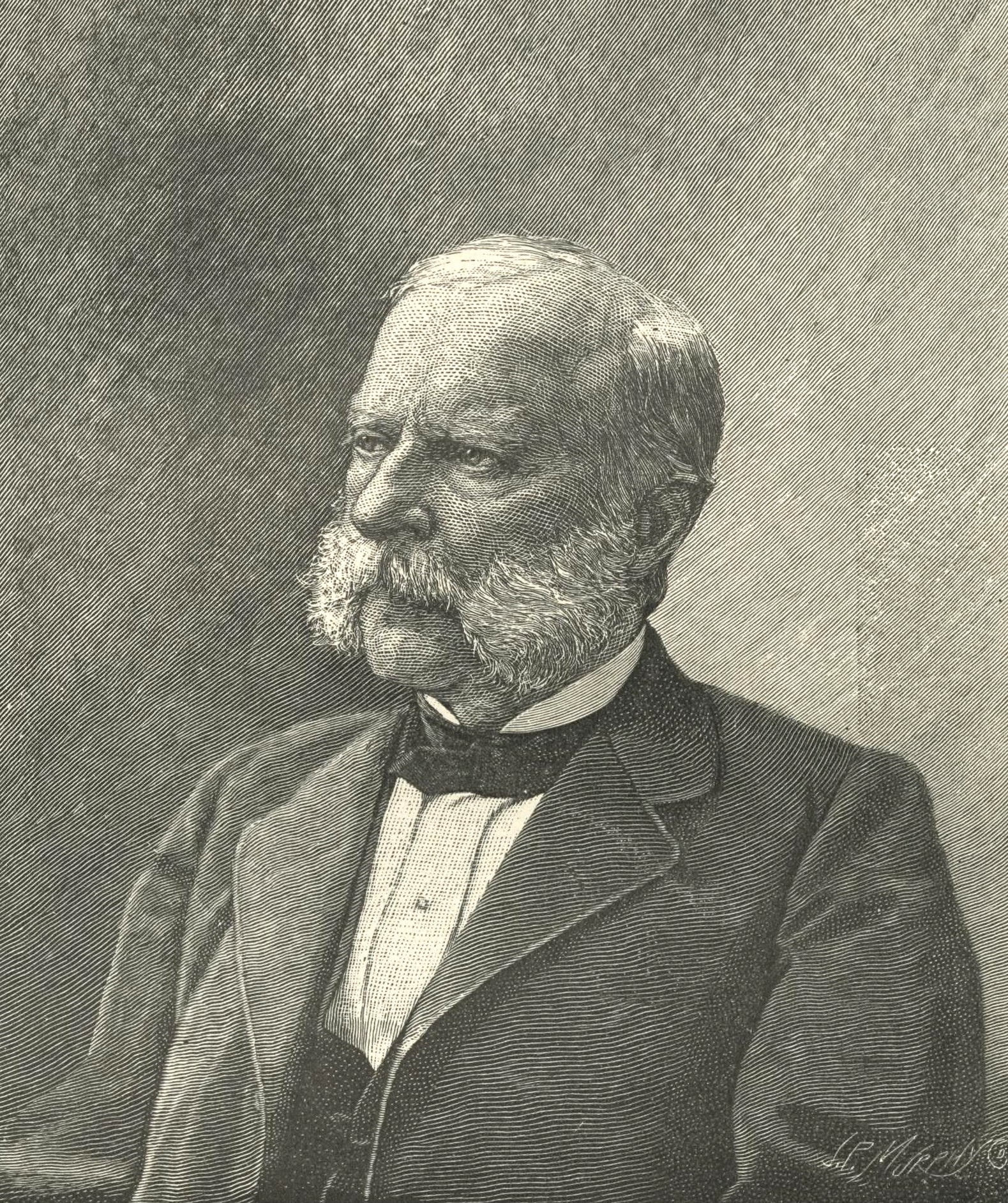

31st Governor of Massachusetts
- In office January 2, 1879 – January 8, 1880
- Lieutenant: John Davis Long
- Preceded by: Alexander H. Rice
- Succeeded by: John Davis Long

29th Lieutenant Governor of Massachusetts
- In office 1873 – January 7, 1875; Acting Governor; April 29, 1874 – January 7, 1875
- Governor: William B. Washburn
- Preceded by: Joseph Tucker
- Succeeded by: Horatio G. Knight

Personal details
- Born: September 7, 1818 Cambridge, New York, United States
- Died: October 6, 1885 (aged 67) Lowell, Massachusetts, United States
- Party: Republican

Thomas Talbot (September 7, 1818 – October 6, 1885) was an American textile mill owner and politician from Massachusetts, United States. Talbot ran a major textile business, involving chemical dyeworks and the weaving of fabric, in Billerica that was a major local employer. As a Republican, he served in the state legislature, on the Massachusetts Governor's Council, and as the 29th lieutenant governor before serving for one partial term as acting governor of Massachusetts, and later for one full term as the 31st governor.

Born to Irish immigrants, Talbot was minimally educated, working in textile mills from an early age. He entered into a partnership with his brother, founding the Talbot Mills of Billerica in 1857. He became politically active, partly due to issues with the mills, and served two terms as Lieutenant Governor, acting as Governor for part of the second term after Governor William B. Washburn won election to the United States Senate. Talbot was a strong temperance advocate, and his veto of a popular alcohol licensing bill contributed to his loss in the 1874 gubernatorial race. He was more successful in 1878 against divided opposition, serving a single lackluster term.

== Early life and business ==
Thomas Talbot was born on September 7, 1818, in Cambridge, New York, to Charles and Phoebe (White) Talbot, both Irish immigrants, and was the seventh of eight children. When he was small, the family moved to Danby, Vermont, where his father supervised in a local textile mill. His father died when he was six, and his mother moved the family to Northampton, Massachusetts, where he attended local schools, and began to work at an early age in local mills.

In 1825, Talbot joined a weaving firm established by his older brother Charles in Williamsburg, Massachusetts, where he was first employed as a carder and finisher, and quickly rose to become superintendent. His brother moved to Lowell in 1838, selling the Williamsburg mill, and began processing dyewoods in rented space at a local mill, while Thomas remained in western Massachusetts, working in area mills and continuing his education at an academy in Cummington. In 1840, the two brothers established C.P. Talbot & Co., a business partnership that lasted until Charles died in 1884. The business started out processing dyewoods for use in the textile industry, but expanded into other industrial chemical processing in 1849. The brothers acquired the Concord River water rights of the defunct Middlesex Canal Corporation in 1851, and in 1857 they established Talbot Mills in North Billerica, Massachusetts, in partnership with the Belvidere Mill Company. The business was successful, and the brothers acquired full control of that business in 1862. Thomas focused on the textile business while Charles continued to manage the dye and chemical interests, expanding the facilities in 1870 and again in 1880.

The mill site in Billerica was not without some controversy. The dam, which had been constructed in the 1790s to provide water for the Middlesex Canal, was believed by some to be responsible for the flooding of fields upstream as far as Sudbury. There were calls to remove the dam, as well as legal action, which Talbot vigorously resisted. The dispute was partly played out in the state legislature, and brought Talbot to the attention of political leaders as a potential candidate for office. Talbot also opposed plans developed by the city of Boston to divert waters of the Sudbury River (a major tributary of the Concord River) for its water supply.

== Political career ==
Talbot, a Republican, served in the Massachusetts legislature beginning in 1851, and sat in the governor's council from 1864 to 1869. In 1872, he was elected lieutenant governor, serving two terms under William B. Washburn. On the selection of Washburn to the United States Senate by the state legislature in early 1874, he became acting governor. One item of unfinished business Washburn left to Talbot was a bill mandating a ten-hour workday. This matter had been the subject of labor agitation in the state, and Washburn had been opposed to the bill. Talbot, despite his mill ownership, was an advocate, and signed the bill into law. He also refused to authorize construction of a prison in Concord, and signed legislation allowing women to vote for members of local school committees.

The state's liquor prohibition law was a major political issues at the time, and Talbot was a strict prohibitionist. During this term he vetoed a bill that would have disbanded the state police, which were charged with the law's enforcement, and also vetoed a bill replacing prohibition with a licensing scheme. In the 1874 election, anti-prohibition Republicans joined with Democrats to elect William Gaston over Talbot by a narrow margin. The election marked a watershed in post-Civil War Massachusetts, since it was the first victory for a Democrat in that period, and exposed the state Republican Party's fractures on domestic affairs like prohibition. Talbot refused to run in 1875.

In 1878, Talbot won nomination as the Republican candidate for governor, in a large field occasioned by the impending retirement of Alexander H. Rice. The Democratic opposition was divided by Benjamin Butler's return to that party, and the Republican ticket won the general election, in part by highlighting the wage and benefit differences in mills owned by Butler and Talbot. The campaign was particularly vicious, with Republicans attacking Butler supporters as "Repudiationists, Greenbackers, and Communists". Talbot served one term, and refused to run for reelection the following year. He supported women's suffrage and prison reform, and stronger state control over its railroads.

After leaving office, Talbot continued in public service, serving on the Health Committee of the Massachusetts State Board of Health, Lunacy, and Charity from 1880 to 1884, holding the chair of the committee in 1880–1882. As governor, Talbot had overseen the merger of the Board of Health, with the Board of Lunacy and Charity. Although this merger had been done ostensibly as a cost-saving measure, health care activists opposed it. Henry Ingersoll Bowditch, in particular, resigned from the merged board, complaining that it was dominated by business owners seeking to minimize discussion of pollution caused by their businesses.

== Family and legacy ==
Talbot married twice. In 1848, he married Mary Howe Rogers, who died childless in 1851. In 1855, he married Isabella Hayden, daughter of Joel Hayden of Williamsburg, with whom he had seven children. He died at his North Billerica home in 1885, and was interred in Lowell Cemetery.

In 1905, the town of Billerica opened the Thomas T. Talbot Elementary School on 33 Talbot Avenue. The school would serve grades 1 through 6, until the 1972 when the 6th grade was migrated to the new middle school. The school continued to educate grades 1 through 5 until it closed in June 1980. It was renovated and reopened as the Talbot School Apartments that serves the elderly and disabled.

The surviving Talbot Mill properties in North Billerica are listed on the National Register of Historic Places as part of the Billerica Mills Historic District.

== Notes ==
Party political offices
Preceded by William B. Washburn	Republican nominee for Governor of Massachusetts; 1874	Succeeded by Alexander H. Rice
Preceded by Alexander H. Rice	Republican nominee for Governor of Massachusetts; 1878	Succeeded by John Davis Long
Political offices
Preceded by Joseph Tucker	Lieutenant Governor of Massachusetts; 1873–1875	Succeeded by Horatio G. Knight
Preceded by William B. Washburn as Governor	Acting Governor of Massachusetts; April 29, 1874 – January 7, 1875	Succeeded by William Gaston as Governor
Preceded by Alexander H. Rice	Governor of Massachusetts; January 2, 1879 – January 8, 1880	Succeeded by John D. Long
