= William Gaston (Massachusetts politician) =

American politician and lawyer (1820-1894)

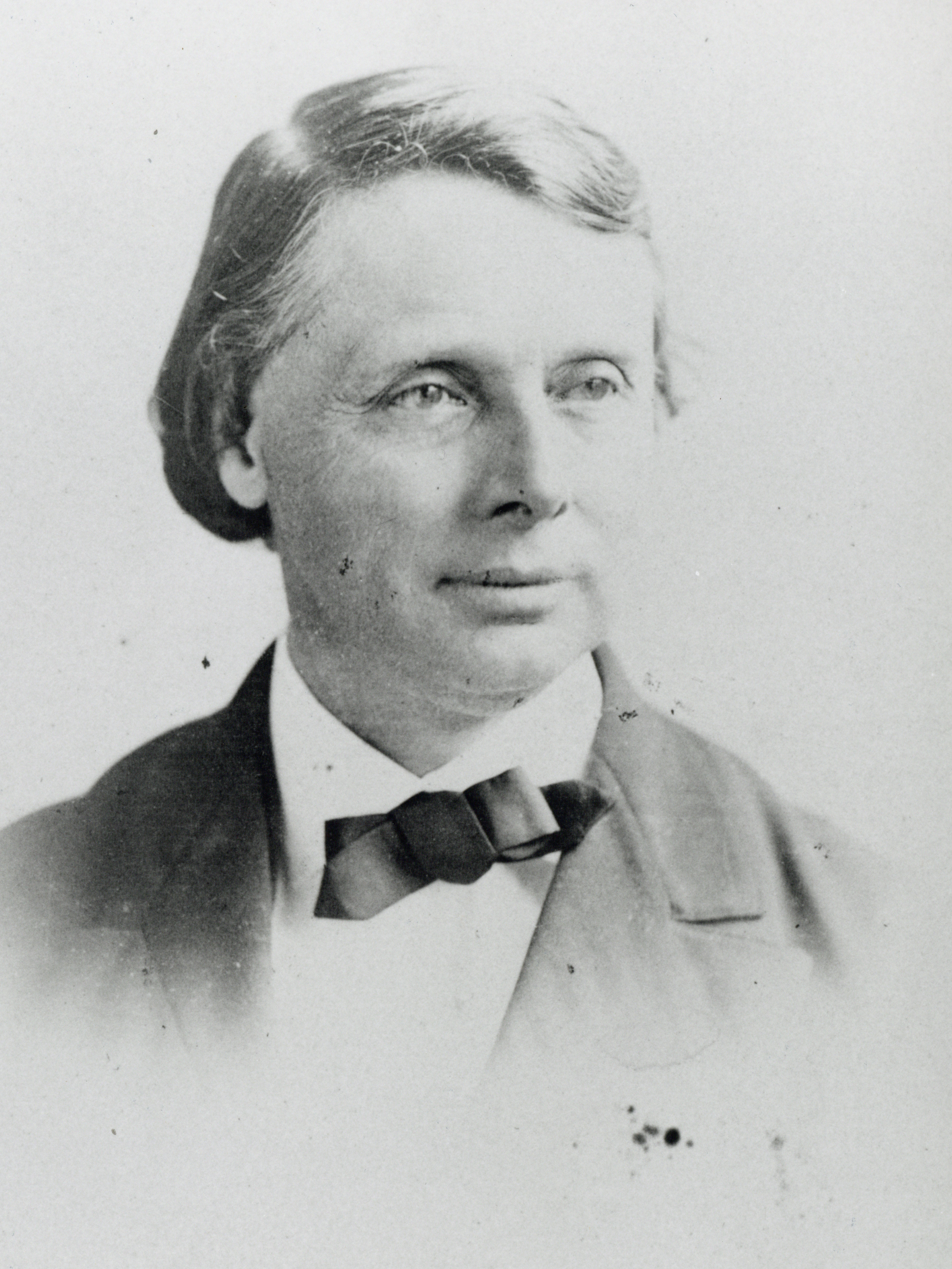

29th Governor of Massachusetts
- In office January 7, 1875 – January 6, 1876
- Lieutenant: Horatio G. Knight
- Preceded by: Thomas Talbot (acting)
- Succeeded by: Alexander H. Rice

Mayor of Boston
- In office 1871–1872
- Preceded by: Nathaniel B. Shurtleff
- Succeeded by: Henry L. Pierce

8th Mayor of Roxbury, Massachusetts
- In office 1861–1862
- Preceded by: Theodore Otis
- Succeeded by: George Lewis

Member of the Massachusetts State Senate
- In office 1868–1868

Member of the Massachusetts House of Representatives
- In office 1856–1856
- In office 1853–1854

Personal details
- Born: October 3, 1820 Killingly, Connecticut, U.S.
- Died: January 19, 1894 (aged 73) Boston, Massachusetts, U.S.
- Party: Whig; Democratic
- Education: Brown University
- Profession: Lawyer

William Gaston (October 3, 1820 – January 19, 1894) was a lawyer and politician from Massachusetts. A Democrat, he was the first member of that party to serve as Governor of Massachusetts (1875–1876) after the American Civil War. He was a successful trial lawyer and politically conservative Democrat, who won election as governor after his opponent, Thomas Talbot, vetoed legislation to relax alcohol controls.

Born in Connecticut, Gaston was educated at Brown University, where he helped establish the second chapter of Delta Phi in 1838. Gaston launched a successful law practice in Roxbury before becoming involved in local politics. In the 1860s, he served as mayor of Roxbury, and afterward promoted its annexation to Boston (completed in 1868). He then later served as Boston mayor, during a period which included the Great Boston Fire of 1872.

== Early years ==
Gaston was born on October 3, 1820, in Killingly, Connecticut. His father, Alexander Gaston, was a merchant of French Huguenot descent, and his mother, Kezia Arnold Gaston, was from an old Rhode Island family. He received his primary education at Brooklyn, Connecticut, and was prepared for college in the academy at Plainfield. He entered Brown University at the age of fifteen, and graduated in 1840 with high honors.

Gaston then moved to Roxbury, Massachusetts (then independent of neighboring Boston), where his parents had taken up residence, to pursue the study of law. He first studied with Francis Hillard, and then with Benjamin Curtis, later a justice of the United States Supreme Court. He was admitted to the Massachusetts Bar in 1844, and opened his own practice in Roxbury in 1846. The practice flourished, and he soon became a leading trial lawyer in Norfolk and Suffolk Counties.

In 1852, Gaston married Louisa Augusta Beecher. They were the parents of three children, including William A. Gaston, who joined his law firm, and also became a leader in the Democratic party, losing at runs for the governorship in 1902 and 1903.

== Roxbury and Boston politics ==
Gaston became involved in Roxbury city politics not long after settling there. He was elected to its common council from 1849 to 1853, serving as council president the last two years. He represented the city in the state legislature (1853–54) as a Whig, and was swept out of office in the 1854 Know Nothing landslide that destroyed the Whig Party. His opposition to the Know Nothing cause gained him support in the city's Irish American community, and he was once again elected to the legislature as a Democrat in 1856. He was also appointed Roxbury's solicitor in 1856, a post he held until 1860.

In 1860, Gaston ran successfully for mayor of Roxbury, and won election again the following year. His moderate and fiscal conservative policies were popular, drawing Republican voters to his camp. He supported the Union cause during the American Civil War, raising troops at home and visiting them in the field. He resumed the private practice of law after his second term.

During the 1860s the annexation of Roxbury to Boston was discussed, and Gaston, who supported the idea, was appointed to the Roxbury commission that evaluated the idea in 1867. He ran unsuccessfully for a seat in the United States Congress in 1870. Later that year he was elected Mayor of Boston, going on to serve two one-year terms. The most notable event of his tenure as mayor, the Great Boston Fire of 1872, occurred late in the second term. The fire destroyed a large swath of the commercial district of the city, and Gaston was criticized for failing to show decisive leadership during attempts to bring the fire under control. This weak showing, combined with a poor response to a smallpox epidemic in the city, contributed to his loss in a bid for a third term.

== Governor of Massachusetts ==
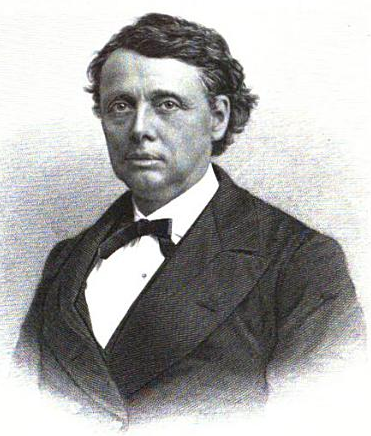
Engraved portrait, published 1895

In 1873, Gaston ran for Governor of Massachusetts. The dominant Republican Party had been split in 1872 by the formation of the Liberal Republicans, and the state's Democrats sensed an opportunity. Gaston ran on a platform calling for a liberalization of the state's harsh alcohol prohibition laws, which his opponent, incumbent Republican William B. Washburn, had supported. Gaston narrowly lost the election. Washburn resigned in 1874 after winning election to the United States Senate, and Gaston ran in 1874 against Acting Governor Thomas Talbot. Talbot also supported the continuance of statewide prohibition, vetoing popular legislation for loosening restrictions on alcohol. Gaston was also helped by discontent with the corruption endemic in the administration of President Ulysses S. Grant and the disunity among the Republicans, from whom Benjamin Butler siphoned votes with a third-party run. Gaston ended up winning a comfortable victory. He became the first Democrat to win the governorship since before the Civil War, ending a string of consecutive Republican victories. His victory was also an early indicator of the growing power of Irish Americans in the state, who made up an important base of his support.

During his term as governor, Gaston was widely viewed as moderate, "more patriot than partisan", as one Boston newspaper put it. Gaston promoted the repeal of the state's prohibition law, replacing it with restrictions and licensing of alcohol sales determined by the cities and towns. He also reduced the size of the state constabulary, which had enforced the old prohibition law. He came under criticism within his own party, however, for his failure to turn partisan Republican appointees out of their offices and replace them with Democratic stalwarts.

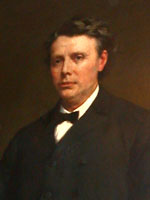
Portrait of Gaston by Frederick Porter Vinton, 1895

Gaston's quest for a second term was ended by public outrage over his failure to sign the death warrant of convicted juvenile murderer Jesse Pomeroy. Pomeroy, then fourteen years old, had been convicted December 10, 1874, of first degree murder for the murder of Horace Holden Millen April 22, 1874, and been sentenced to death. There was public clamor favoring his execution, especially after he attempted to escape from prison. Gaston, despite two rulings by the Governor's Council that clemency be denied, refused to sign the execution order. This was an unpopular move which likely contributed to his loss in the 1875 election. Republican Alexander H. Rice, who defeated Gaston in an otherwise lackluster campaign, also refused to sign the execution order, but his Council eventually recommended commutation of Pomeroy's sentence to life in solitary confinement.

== Later years ==
After his term as governor ended, Gaston returned to his law practice. His practice, established in 1865 with Harvey Jewell and Walbridge A. Field, was highly successful. Gaston was known to not particularly like criminal law, but he was acknowledged as one of the period's leading trial lawyers. Gaston represented Archbishop John Joseph Williams and Father John H. Fleming when the parents of a teenage girl sued after Fleming lost an image of an angel that the girl believed was given to her by the Blessed Virgin Mary.

He served as president of the Boston Bar Association from 1880 to 1881. He died in 1894, and is buried in Forest Hills Cemetery.

== See also ==
- 1868 Massachusetts legislature
- Timeline of Boston, 1870s

== Bibliography ==
- Bar Association of the City of Boston (1919). Officers and Members of the Bar Association of the City of Boston. Boston. OCLC 12183075.
- Baum, Dale (1984). The Civil War Party System: The Case of Massachusetts, 1848-1876. Chapel Hill, NC: University of North Carolina Press. ISBN 9780807815885. OCLC 9970596.
- City of Boston (1895). A Memorial of William Gaston. Boston. OCLC 733824.
- Davis, William (1895). Bench and Bar of the Commonwealth of Massachusetts, Volume 1. Boston: The Boston History Company. OCLC 15711603.
- Eliot, Samuel Atkins (1911). Biographical History of Massachusetts: Biographies and Autobiographies of the Leading Men in the State, Volume 1. Boston: Massachusetts Biographical Society. OCLC 8185704.
- Fuess, Claude Moore (1928). "Gaston, William". Dictionary of American Biography. Vol. 4. New York: Scribners. pp. 181–182. OCLC 37255176.
- Kennedy, Lawrence (Spring 2010). "Young Patrick A. Collins and Boston Politics after the Civil War". Historical Journal of Massachusetts. 38 (1): 38–59.
- McFarland, Gerald (1999). "Gaston, William". Dictionary of American National Biography. Vol. 8. New York: Oxford University Press. pp. 782–783. ISBN 9780195206357. OCLC 39182280.
- Sammarco, Anthony (2009). Forest Hills Cemetery. Charleston, SC: Arcadia Publishing. ISBN 9781439620519. OCLC 677921414.
- Schechter, Harold (2012) [2000]. Fiend: The Shocking True Story of America's Youngest Serial Killer. New York: Simon & Schuster. ISBN 9780671014483. OCLC 46847410.

Party political offices
Preceded by Francis W. Bird	Democratic nominee for Governor of Massachusetts; 1873, 1874, 1875	Succeeded by Charles Francis Adams Sr.
Preceded by Charles Francis Adams Sr.	Democratic nominee for Governor of Massachusetts; 1877	Succeeded by Benjamin Butler
Political offices
Preceded by Thomas Talbot as Acting Governor	Governor of Massachusetts; January 7, 1875 – January 6, 1876	Succeeded by Alexander H. Rice
Preceded by Nathaniel B. Shurtleff	Mayor of Boston, Massachusetts; 1871–1872	Succeeded by Henry L. Pierce
Preceded by Theodore Otis	Mayor of Roxbury, Massachusetts; 1861–1862	Succeeded by George Lewis
