= 1867 Massachusetts gubernatorial election =

- November 5, 1867
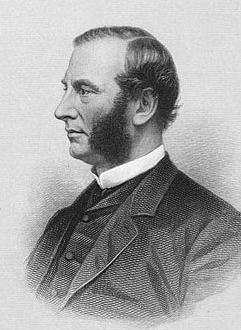

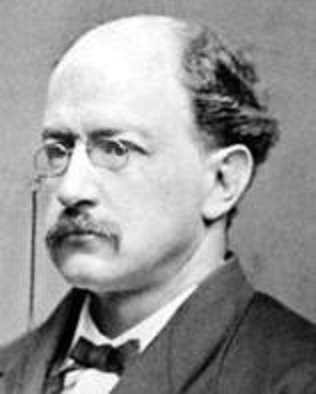
Nominee	Alexander Bullock	John Quincy Adams II
Party	Republican	Democratic
Popular vote	98,306	70,360
Percentage	58.24%	41.69%
- County results Bullock: 50–60% 60–70% 70–80% 80–90% Adams: 50–60%
Governor before election
Alexander Bullock
Republican
Elected Governor
Alexander Bullock
Republican

The 1867 Massachusetts gubernatorial election was held on November 5.

Governor Alexander Bullock was re-elected to a third term in office, defeating Democrat John Quincy Adams II.

== Republican nomination ==
=== Candidates ===
- John Albion Andrew, former governor (1861–65)
- Alexander Bullock, incumbent governor since 1865
- William Claflin, lieutenant governor and chairman of the Republican National Committee
- Henry L. Dawes, U.S. representative from Pittsfield
- George B. Loring, state representative from Salem
- F. E. Parker (Note: Possibly Francis E. Parker, a member of the Massachusetts Historical Society)
- Joseph Adams Pond, president of the Massachusetts Senate
- Alexander H. Rice, U.S. representative from Boston

=== Results ===
There was a motion to re-nominate Bullock by acclamation, but it was rejected and withdrawn. Nonetheless, Bullock easily won on the first ballot against scattered opposition.

1867 Massachusetts Republican Convention
Party	Candidate	Votes	%
Republican	Alexander Bullock (incumbent)	933	82.71%
Republican	Alexander H. Rice	110	9.75%
Republican	J.A. Pond	50	4.43%
Republican	Henry L. Dawes	19	1.68%
Republican	John Albion Andrew	11	0.98%
Republican	William Claflin	3	0.27%
Republican	F. E. Parker	1	0.09%
Republican	George B. Loring	1	0.09%
Total votes		1,128	100.00%

== General election ==
=== Candidates ===
- John Quincy Adams II, state representative from Quincy (Democratic)
- Alexander Bullock, incumbent governor

=== Results ===
1867 Massachusetts gubernatorial election
Party	Candidate	Votes	%	±%
Republican	Alexander Bullock (incumbent)	98,306	58.24%	▼19.22
Democratic	John Quincy Adams II	70,360	41.69%	▲19.23
Write-in		125	0.07%	▼0.01
Total votes		168,791	100.00%	
Republican hold		Swing		

== See also ==
- 1867 Massachusetts legislature
