= 1866 Massachusetts legislature =

87th Massachusetts General Court
←	86th	88th	→

Overview
- Legislative body: General Court
- Election: November 7, 1865

Senate
- Members: 40
- President: Joseph Adams Pond

House
- Members: 240
- Speaker: James M. Stone

Sessions
- 1st: January 3, 1866 – May 30, 1866

The 87th Massachusetts General Court, consisting of the Massachusetts Senate and the Massachusetts House of Representatives, met in 1866 during the governorship of Alexander H. Bullock. Joseph Adams Pond served as president of the Senate and James M. Stone served as speaker of the House.

Notable legislation included the Factory Inspection Act which aimed to improve workplace safety.

== Senators ==
- J. W. P. Abbott
- Charles Adams Jr.
- Henry Alexander Jr.
- George S. Ball
- Edwin L. Barney
- George O. Brastow
- William Brigham
- Paul A Chadbourne
- F. W. Choate
- Alvah Crocker
- Ebenezer Davis
- James Easton II
- Charles Endicott
- George Foster
- George F. Gavitt
- Daniel B. Gillett
- John Hill
- James Howard
- Yorick G. Hurd
- Jacob Ide Jr.
- Thomas Kneil
- Alden Leland
- Elishia Monk
- Robert M. Morse Jr.
- E. R. Mudge
- Reuben Nickerson
- Benjamin C. Perkins
- Joseph A. Pond
- Lucius W. Pond
- William L. Reed
- Everett Robinson
- Eneas Smyth
- Moses D. Southwick
- Solomon B. Stebbins
- Hiram A. Stevens
- Levi Stockbridge
- Edward S. Tobey
- Joseph Tucker
- Tappan Wentworth
- William F. Wilder

== See also ==
- 39th United States Congress
- List of Massachusetts General Courts
