= 1868 Massachusetts gubernatorial election =

- November 2, 1868
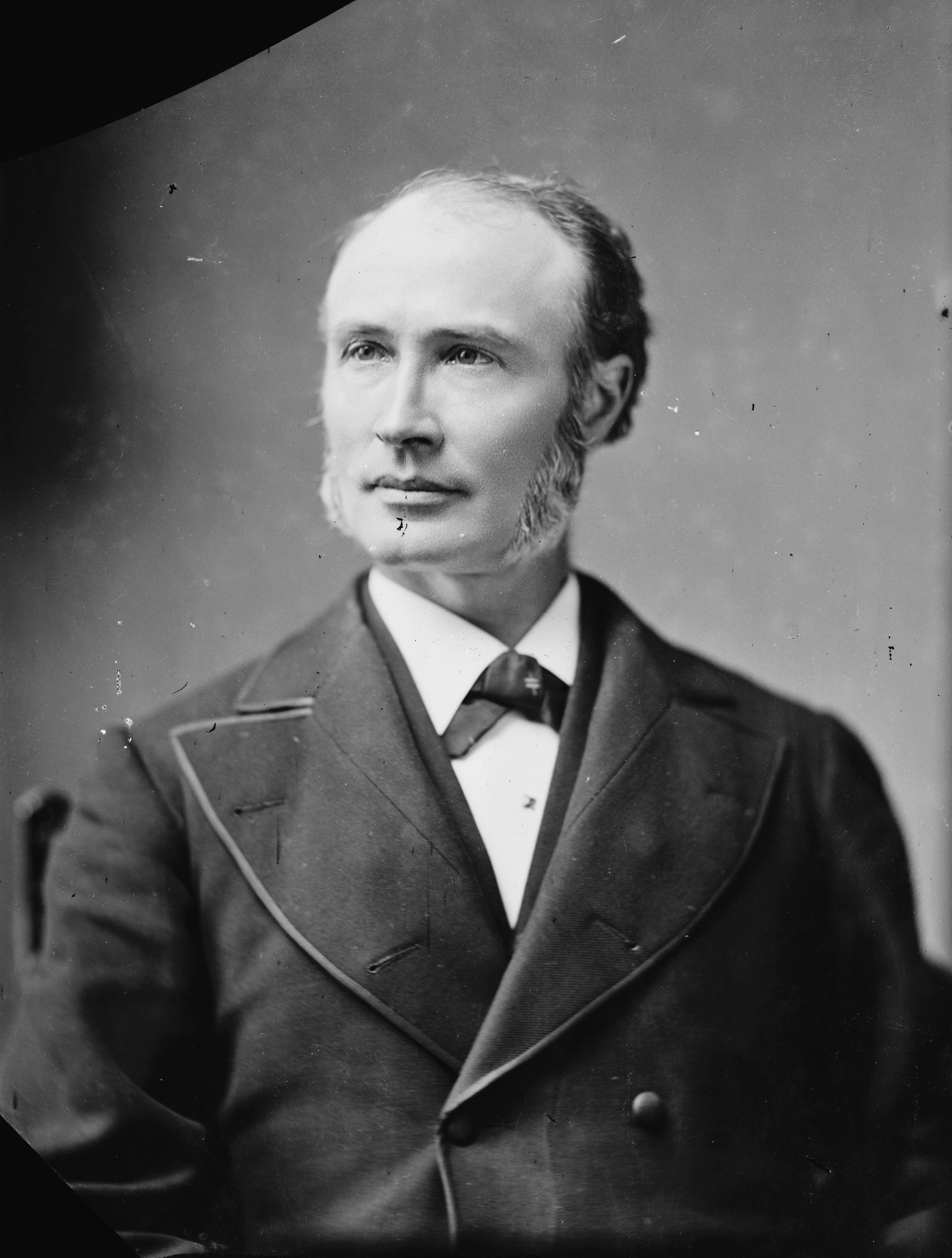

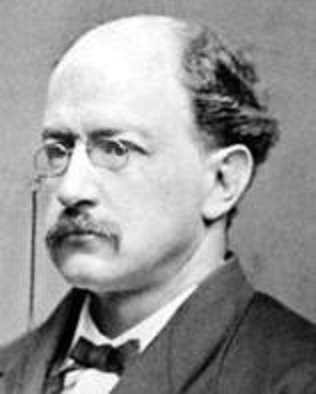
Nominee	William Claflin	John Quincy Adams II
Party	Republican	Democratic
Popular vote	132,121	63,266
Percentage	67.59%	32.37%
- County results Claflin: 50–60% 60–70% 70–80% 80–90% >90%
Governor before election
Alexander Bullock
Republican
Elected Governor
William Clafin
Republican

The 1868 Massachusetts gubernatorial election was held on November 3.

Governor Alexander Bullock did not run for re-election to a fourth term. William Clafin was elected to succeed him over Democrat John Quincy Adams II.

== Republican nomination ==
=== Candidates ===
- William Claflin, lieutenant governor
- George B. Loring, state representative from Salem

=== Results ===
At the Worcester convention on September 9, Benjamin F. Butler withdrew Loring's name from contention and Claflin was nominated by acclamation.

== General election ==
=== Candidates ===
- John Quincy Adams II, former State Representative from Quincy
- William Claflin, Lieutenant Governor and Chairman of the Republican National Committee (Republican)

=== Results ===
1868 Massachusetts gubernatorial election
Party	Candidate	Votes	%	±%
Republican	William Claflin	132,121	67.59%	▼9.35
Democratic	John Quincy Adams II	63,266	32.37%	▲9.32
Write-in		84	0.04%	▼0.03
Total votes		195,471	100.00%	
Republican hold		Swing		

== See also ==
- 1868 Massachusetts legislature
