= Robert Carter Pitman =

American politician (1825–1891)

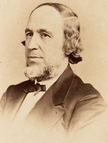

Associate Justice of the Massachusetts Superior Court
- In office 1869 – March 5, 1891

President of the Massachusetts Senate
- In office 1869–1869
- Preceded by: George O. Brastow
- Succeeded by: Horace H. Coolidge

Member of the Massachusetts Senate
- In office 1868–1869

Member of the Massachusetts Senate
- In office 1864–1865

Member of the Massachusetts House of Representatives
- In office 1858–1858

Personal details
- Born: March 16, 1825 Newport, Rhode Island, U.S.
- Died: March 5, 1891 (aged 65) Newton, Massachusetts, U.S.
- Education: Wesleyan University (LL.D.); Centenary College

Robert Carter Pitman (March 16, 1825 – March 5, 1891) was a Superior Court judge in Massachusetts, a temperance advocate, and a legislator in the Massachusetts General Court.

Pitman was born in Newport, Rhode Island on March 16, 1825, the son of Benjamin and Mary Ann (Carter) Pitman. He was educated at the public schools of Bedford, at the Friends Academy, and at Wesleyan University, where he became a member of the Mystical Seven, graduating in 1845. He studied law and taught briefly at Centenary College in Louisiana in 1846 or 1847.

Pitman was admitted to the bar in New Bedford, Massachusetts in 1848. He practiced law until 1869, and was at different times a partner with Thomas D. Eliot and Alanson Borden. In 1858, he was appointed a judge of the Police Court. He was a state representative in 1858 and a state senator in 1864-65 and 1868–69; and in the last year he was President of the Senate. In 1869, he was appointed an associate justice of the Superior Court of Massachusetts, and remained on the bench until his death. That same year, he received a LL.D. degree from Wesleyan University.

Pitman became active in the temperance movement, and in 1873 he became president of the National Temperance Convention, and wrote and extensively on the societal effects of alcohol. Pitman was also the author of Alcohol and the State: A Discussion of the Problem of Law in 1877, a comprehensive 400 page tome. This book has recently had a new life by being reissued on a CDrom set.

Pitman married Frances R., daughter of Rev. M. G. Thomas, in New Bedford on August 15, 1855. He died at Newton on March 5, 1891.

== See also ==
- 1869 Massachusetts legislature

Political offices
Preceded by George O. Brastow	President of the Massachusetts Senate; 1869	Succeeded by Horace H. Coolidge
