= 1867 Massachusetts legislature =

88th Massachusetts General Court
←	87th	89th	→

Overview
- Legislative body: General Court
- Election: November 6, 1866

Senate
- Members: 40
- President: Joseph Adams Pond
- Party control: Republican (40)

House
- Members: 240
- Speaker: James M. Stone
- Party control: Republican (230 R, 10 D)

Sessions
- 1st: January 2, 1867 – June 1, 1867

The 88th Massachusetts General Court, consisting of the Massachusetts Senate and the Massachusetts House of Representatives, met in 1867 during the governorship of Republican Alexander Bullock. Joseph Adams Pond served as president of the Senate and James M. Stone served as speaker of the House.

In 1867 the Republican power in the Legislature was total in the Senate with all forty seats held by the party's members. In the House, Republicans held 230 seats as against but 10 Democrats.

== Senators ==
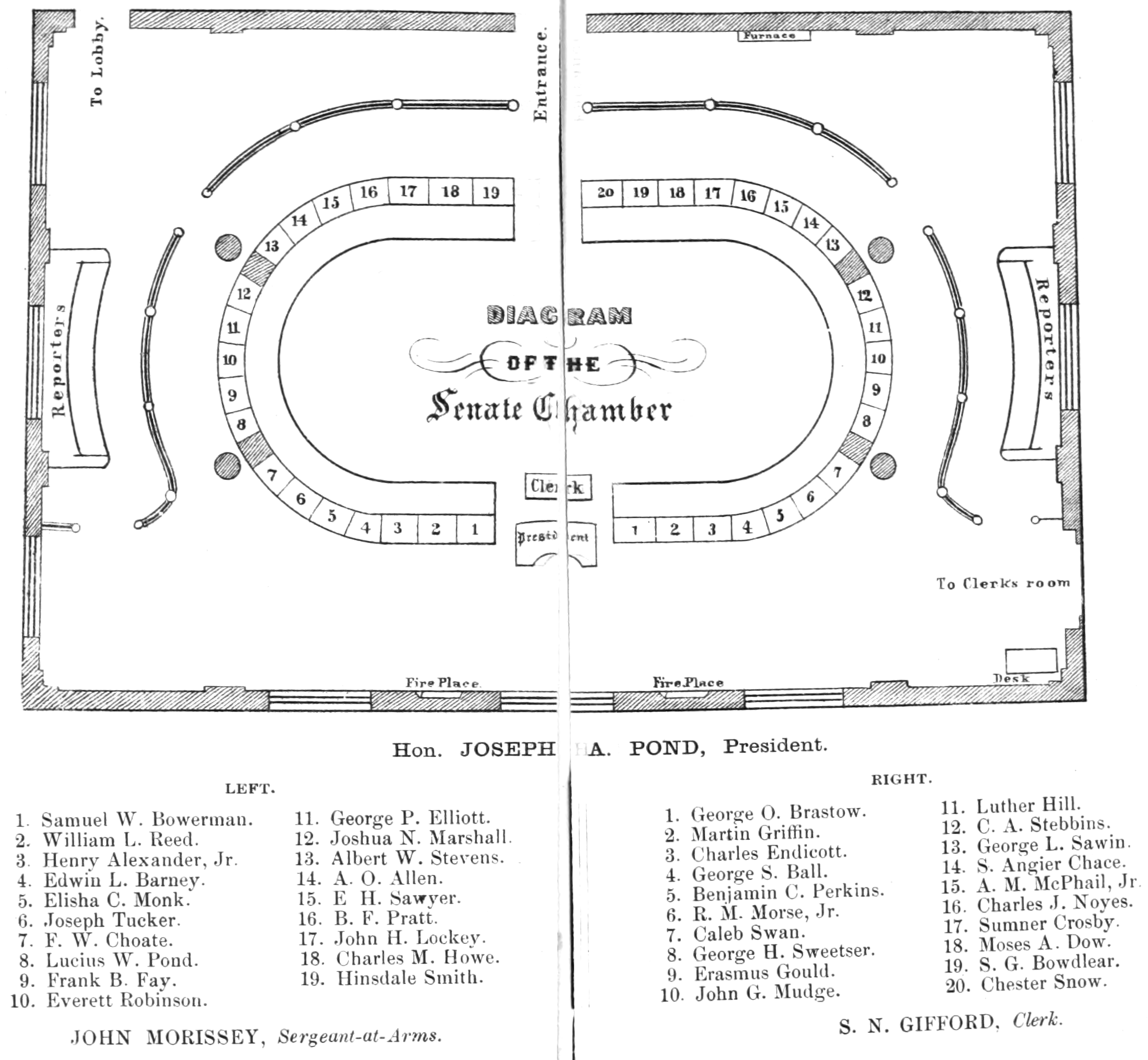
Seating chart of Massachusetts senate in 1867

- Henry Alexander Jr.
- A. O. Allen
- George S. Ball
- Edwin L. Barney, (April 1, 1827–April 6, 1897) was born in Swansea and became a lawyer in New Bedford
- S. G. Bowdlear, a flour merchant
- S. W. Bowerman (Samuel W. Bowean) lived in Pittsfield
- George O. Brastow
- S. Angier Chace, businessman and banker in Fall River who was convicted of misuse of bank funds
- F. W. Choate
- Sumner Crosby
- Moses A. Dow
- George P. Elliott
- Charles Endicott
- Frank B. Fay
- Erasmus Gould, of Falmouth who was president of Falmouth Bank. He also served in the state house
- Martin Griffin (1822–1884), born in Ireland and lived in Boston's North End. He served several terms
- Luther Hill
- Charles M. Howe
- John H. Lockey
- A. M. McPhail Jr.
- Joshua N. Marshall
- E. C Monk (Elisha Capen Monk), lived in Stoughton and was in the boot business
- R. M. Morse Jr.
- John G. Mudge, a prominent resident and library sponsor in Petersham who was a captain in the 53rd Massachusetts Infantry during the American Civil War
- Charles J. Noyes
- Benjamin C. Perkins
- J. A. Pond
- L. W. Pond (Lucius W. Pond), machine tool maker
- B. F. Pratt
- William L. Reed
- Everett Robinson
- George L. Sawin
- Edmund H. Sawyer
- Hinsdale Smith
- Chester Snow
- Christopher Stebbins
- Albert W. Stevens
- Caleb Swan
- George H. Sweetser
- Joseph Tucker

== Representatives ==
- Rufus Adams
- P. Emory Aldrich
- James G. Allen
- Titus Amadon
- Joseph L. Andrews
- Samuel Atherton
- Edward Avery
- Edwin H. Ball
- Frederick K. Ballou
- John V. Barker
- Lemuel Le Baron
- Joseph Barrows
- Andrew J. Bartholemew
- Alvin G. Bartlett
- Porter G. Barton
- J. H. Batchelder
- De Witt C. Bates
- Jacob Bates
- Francis J. Baxter
- David M. Bean
- Joseph Bedortha
- John C. Bigelow
- Francis W. Bird
- Albert Blood
- John Botume, Jr
- L. H. Bowker
- Addison Boyden
- David Boynton
- Joseph S. Bradley
- John Branning
- Silas N. Brooks
- George A. Brown
- Oliver H. P. Brown
- William B. Brown
- Ezra P. Brownell
- Charles Bryant
- Dexter Bullard
- Alvah A. Burrage
- Amos Buswell
- Abel H. Calkins
- Zacheus Candee
- John Carruthers
- Addison Center
- Jonas A. Champney
- Heman B. Chase
- Isaac K. Chipman
- Elijah H. Chisholm
- Andrew J. Clark
- William S. Clark
- Henry M. Clarke
- Timothy F. Clary
- James H. Codding
- Isaac H. Coe
- Aury G. Coes
- Michael D. Collins
- Luther Conant
- George A. Converse
- Horace H. Coolidge
- Benjamin A. Corbin
- George D. Crittenden
- John A. Daly
- Richard H. Dana, Jr
- Anson Daniels
- Benjamin H. Davis
- David Davis
- Charles Demond
- Jeremy B. Dennett
- Charles Dickerman
- Nathaniel H. Dill
- Henry Diman
- George B. Dodge
- Charles H. Drew
- Lewis J. Dudley
- Elisha M. Dunham
- Sebastian S. Dunn
- Charles B. Emerson
- B. C. English
- Constantine C. Esty
- William J. R. Evans
- Thomas J. Fay
- Richard J. Fennelly
- George E. Fisher
- Edmund Flinn
- James A. Fox
- Jonathan C. French
- Walter Gale
- Noah M. Gaylord
- George L. Gill
- Wesley A. Gove
- William E. Gowing
- Benjamin Hale
- Samuel Hall
- William T. Hall
- Lyman S. Hapgood
- Hamlin R. Harding
- Alpheus Harding, Jr
- Daniel L. Harris
- Abraham G. Hart
- Alfred S. Hartwell
- John B. Hathaway
- George P. Hawkes
- Frederick Hebard
- George Heywood
- Enoch V. B. Holcomb
- Addison H. Holland
- Egbert Hollister
- George F. Homer
- Anson P. Hooker
- John C. Houghton
- Sereno Howe
- John A. Hughes
- Harvey Jewell
- Andrew F. Jewett
- Berijah H. Kagwin
- George W. Keed
- Moses Kimball
- Rufus Kimball
- Dexter S. King
- Solomon D. King
- Emory W. Lane
- William H. Lapham
- James H. Leland
- John Livermore
- Joshua C. Longley
- George B. Loring
- J. Q. A. Lothrop
- Gorham P. Low
- Uriah Macoy
- Hugh A. Madden
- John F. Manahan
- James F. Mansfield
- John S. March
- George Marston
- Knott V. Martin
- David H. Mason
- J. Wilder May
- John McClellan
- Henry Mclntire
- John E. Merrill
- Alfred Miller
- John Miller
- Charles Lewis Mitchell
- James S. Montague
- Ira L. Moore
- Daniel Needham
- John S. Needham
- Thomas G. Nichols
- Rufus S. Owen
- Calvin A. Packard
- Charles J. Paine
- Augustus Parker
- Isaac Parsons
- Warren Partridge
- Edwin Patch
- George R. Peckham
- Benjamin F. Peirce
- George H. Peirson
- Jesse S. Pendegrast
- Edward Y. Perry
- Joseph A. Perry
- James Pierce
- Avery Plumer
- Joseph G. Pollard
- Joseph S. Potter
- J. Winsor Pratt
- Noah Prince
- James H. Putnam
- Simeon Putnam
- John W. Raymond
- Erastus M. Reed
- James B. Reed
- Austin Rice
- Edmund Rice
- Elias Richards
- Henry E. Rockwell
- Charles E. Rogers
- Edward H. Rogers
- George F. Rowland
- Alpheus A. Russegue
- Addison A. Sawyer
- Ezra Sawyer
- Charles C. Sewell
- Georoje Sheldon
- Edward F. Sherman
- Hiram S. Shurtleff
- Samuel Small
- Charles E. Smith
- Oliver W. Smith
- William C. Spaulding
- Walter S. Sprague
- George W. Stacy
- Joseph C. Stacy
- William A. Stearns
- Daniel B. Stedman
- Francis Stevens
- J. Warren Stevens
- Levi Stockbridge
- Eben F. Stone
- James M. Stone
- Joshua C. Stone
- Charles A. Stott
- Ebenezer Swan
- Edward Taylor
- Jonathan C. Taylor
- Solomon Thacher
- David Thayer
- Shepard Thayer
- William W. Thayer
- Newell A. Thompson
- Hubbard W. Tilton
- Edward Tisdale
- J. Scott Todd
- Richard Tolman
- Samuel J. Tuttle
- William E. Underwood
- George Vose
- William H. Waitt
- Edwin Garrison Walker
- Noah Wallace
- Eben N. Wardwell
- Anson K. Warner
- John T. Warner
- Samuel Warren
- Thomas W. Wason
- Henfy S. Wheeler
- J. Murray Whitcomb
- Rufus A. White
- Milton Whitney
- Nathan S. Williams
- Clement Willis
- Thomas Wilson
- Nahum Witherbee
- Andrew C. Wood
- Lyman Woodward
- George W. Woodwell
- Albert J. Wright
- Edwin Wright
- Winsor Wright
- Wm. H. P. Wright
- Franklin Wyman

== See also ==
- 40th United States Congress
- List of Massachusetts General Courts
