= 1862 Massachusetts legislature =

Legislative session in Massachusetts, USA

83rd Massachusetts General Court
←	82nd	84th	→

Overview
- Legislative body: General Court
- Election: November 5, 1861

Senate
- Members: 40
- President: John Henry Clifford

House
- Members: 240
- Speaker: Alexander Hamilton Bullock

Sessions
- 1st: January 1, 1862 – April 30, 1862

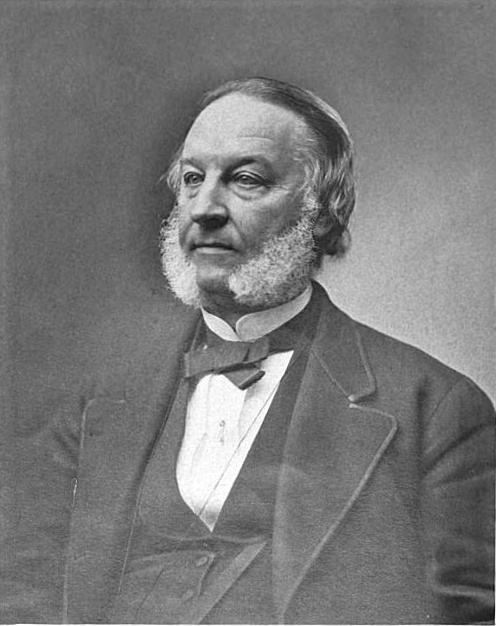
John Henry Clifford, Senate president.

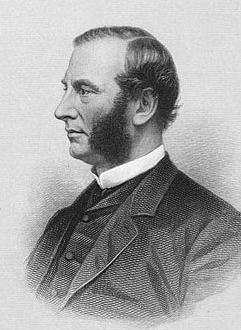
Alexander Hamilton Bullock, House speaker.

Leaders of the Massachusetts General Court, 1862.

The 83rd Massachusetts General Court, consisting of the Massachusetts Senate and the Massachusetts House of Representatives, met in 1862 during the governorship of John Albion Andrew. John Henry Clifford served as president of the Senate and Alexander Hamilton Bullock served as speaker of the House.

== Senators ==
- John J. Babson, 5th Essex
- John W. Bacon, 3rd Middlesex
- Lewis Bodman
- Ezra P. Brownell
- Orlo Burt
- John H. Clifford
- Joshua E. Crane
- Alvah Crocker
- Joseph Day
- Benjamin Dean
- Charles Dillingham (1821-1902)
- John C. Dodge
- Rufus B. Dodge Sr. of Charlton a teacher and surveyor, father of Rufus B. Dodge
- Walter Fessenden
- Ebenezer Gay
- Edwin B. George
- G. H. Gilbert
- Whiting Griswold
- E. O. Haven (Erastus Otis Haven), a teacher and professor who became the second president of the University of Michigan
- William R. Hill
- William F. Johnson
- R. H. Libby
- Charles Greely Loring, 3rd Suffolk
- James H. Mitchell
- William D. Northend (William Dummer Northend) (February 26, 1823-October 29, 1902), a lawyer politician, and author
- Thomas F. Plunkett
- Chester I. Reed
- Daniel S. Richardson
- Henry Smith
- Charles G. Stevens
- Stephen N. Stockwell
- William D. Swan (William Draper Swan) (November 17, 1809-November 2, 1864), school principal, bookseller, and author of school books
- James M. Thompson
- Christopher Tompkins
- John C. Tucker
- Alexander H. Twombly (Alexander Hamilton Twombly) (1804-1870), Hamilton McKown Twombly was his son
- Horace P. Wakefield (Horace Poole Wakefield), (1809-1883) a doctor, school superintendent, and abolitionist in Reading
- Jonathan Wales
- Milton B. Whitney
- Hartley Williams

== Representatives ==
- J. W. P. Abbot
- Nathan Adams
- O. W. Albee
- Horace Armsby
- Wm. H. Atwell
- Charles R. Atwood
- Seth J. Axtell
- Jacob Baker
- Samuel N. Baker
- Henry Baldwin
- Everett C. Banfield
- Ezekiel Bates
- Josiah Beard
- Charles Beck
- Zachariah L. Bicknell
- Dexter Blood
- Simeon Borden
- Sylvester S. Bowen
- George O. Brastow
- Joseph Breck
- Aza A. Breed
- Abel E. Bridge
- Francis Brooks
- Amos Brown
- Edward Brown
- James Brown
- Joseph Brown
- Nathan G. Brown
- Uriah T. Brownell
- James Bullard
- R. I. Burbank
- Albert Butler
- Calvin Butrick
- Cyrus Butterfield
- David Cain
- Henry Cartwright
- AVilliam H. Cary
- Peleg W. Chandler
- Tracy P. Cheever
- Christopher A. Church
- Charles F. Claflin
- James W. Clark
- Harrison D. Clement
- John D. Coggswell
- Harvey B. Coleman
- Thorley Collester
- Horace Cook
- Samuel Cook
- Gilman Corning
- Noah Cummings
- Albert Currier
- George Curtis
- John R. Cushman
- Eben Cutler
- Keyes Danforth
- Joseph D. Daniels
- Charles G. Davis
- Seymour B. Dewey
- Reuben DeWitt
- John H. Dike
- Cornelius Doherty
- John J. Doland
- George W. Donaldson
- William D. Earle
- Ebenezer Eaton
- George Eaton
- George P. Elliot
- Caleb L. Ellis
- Hiram Emery
- Farwell F Fay
- Alfred R. Field
- Charles H. Field
- Jonathan E Field
- John T. Fitch
- John Fletcher, Jr.
- John F. Flynn
- Edmund D. Foster
- George Foster
- Abram S. French
- Josiak B. French
- Zadock W. Gates
- Samuel H. Gibbens
- Robert Gibbs
- Nathaniel Gilbert
- Alonzo M. Giles
- James A. Gillis
- Delano A. Goddard
- Austin Gove
- Daniel G. Grafton
- Zachariah Graves
- Zebedee Green
- Erastus F Gunn
- Caleb Gushing
- Andrew J. Hadley
- Lucas W. Hannum
- James L. Hanson
- Hamlin R. Harding
- Samuel R. Hathaway
- Manson B. Haws
- Jared M. Heard
- Lorenzo D. Hervey
- George Heywood
- Samuel Higgins
- Paul Hill
- Luther Holland
- Jesse Holmes
- Benjamin Homer
- William P. Hood
- Anson Hooker
- Nathaniel Howard
- Sereno Howe
- Isaiah Jenkins
- Harvey Jewell
- James S. Jewett
- Amos Howe Johnson
- George N. Johnson
- Joseph P. Johnson
- Thomas H. Kelt
- John R. Kimball
- D. Webster King
- Ezra Kingman
- Lucius J. Knowles
- Artemas Lee
- George C. Lee
- Daniel G. Littlefield
- Ansel Lothrop
- H. Augustus Lothrop
- Henry O. Lothrop
- Oliver Loud
- Asa E. Lovell
- Henry Luscomb, Jr.
- Sewall G. Mack
- Henry B. Maglathlin
- Charles Manning
- Edgar Marchant
- J. F. B. Marshall
- Francis W. Mason
- William B. May
- Charles J. McCarthy
- Joseph McGregory
- John Meacom
- William T. Metcalf
- Augustus Moody
- Joseph Morrill
- Chas W. Morris
- Elias A. Morse
- Andrew J. Morton
- William Mulligan
- John L. Murphy
- Jonathan H. Nelson
- Stephen G. Newton
- W. H. Nichols
- Amasa Norcross
- William A. Northup
- Lewis R. Norton
- Benjamin Oliver
- Francis J. Parker
- Thomas Parsons
- Henry Peirce
- Ezra Penniman
- Noble M. Perkins
- Simeon Perkins
- Andrew J. Pickens
- Daniel J. Pickering
- Henry L. Pierce
- Charles B. Pool
- Moses Pool
- David Porter
- Henry Pratt
- Benjamin C. Putnam
- Daniel Putnam
- James W. Putnam
- Oliver Ramsdell
- Josiah M. Read
- Mathias Rice
- James Riley
- Samuel Roads
- William A. Robbins
- Austin J. Roberts
- William L. Rodman
- John S. E Rogers
- Hezekiah Root
- Patten Sargent
- John K. Sears
- Joshua M. Sears
- Charles C. Sewall
- Henry Shaw
- Edward F. Sherman
- Emery Sherman
- Elisha Smith
- Sylvanus Smith
- William H. Smith
- William L. Smith
- Otis W. Soule
- Zibeon Southard
- Samuel Souther
- Ebenezer Stanwood
- Theodore Stebbins
- Phineas Stedman
- Danforth S. Steel
- George F. Stetson
- Benjamin Stevens
- Hiram A. Stevens
- Moses T. Stevens
- Joseph P. Stickney
- Samuel W. Stickney
- Eliphalet Stone
- F. M. Stone
- Isaac N. Stone
- Moses Stone
- Phineas J. Stone
- Edward M. Taylor
- Seth Thayer
- Ephraim H. Thompson
- John C. Thompson
- Hudson Tolman
- Everett Torrey
- Charles M. Tyler
- John S. Tyler
- Seth H. Vinall
- Eugene Vosburgh
- Caleb Wait
- Charles T. Walcott
- Cornelius Walker
- Samuel L. Ward
- Stephen G. Wheatland
- Royal Whitaker
- Charles P. White
- Nelson D. White
- Samuel O. Whitmore
- Henry Wilder
- Cyrus Williams
- John D. Wilson
- Albert Winn
- Amos I. Withey
- Hapgood Wright

== See also ==
- 37th United States Congress
- List of Massachusetts General Courts
