= Senator Coolidge (disambiguation) =

Marcus A. Coolidge (1865–1947) was a U.S. Senator from Massachusetts from 1931 to 1937. Senator Coolidge may also refer to:

- Arthur W. Coolidge (1881–1952), Massachusetts State Senate
- Calvin Coolidge (1872–1933), Massachusetts State Senate
- Carlos Coolidge (1792–1866), Vermont State Senate
- Horace H. Coolidge (1832–1912), Massachusetts State Senate
- John Calvin Coolidge Sr. (1845–1926), Vermont State Senate
