= 1869 Massachusetts gubernatorial election =

- November 2, 1869
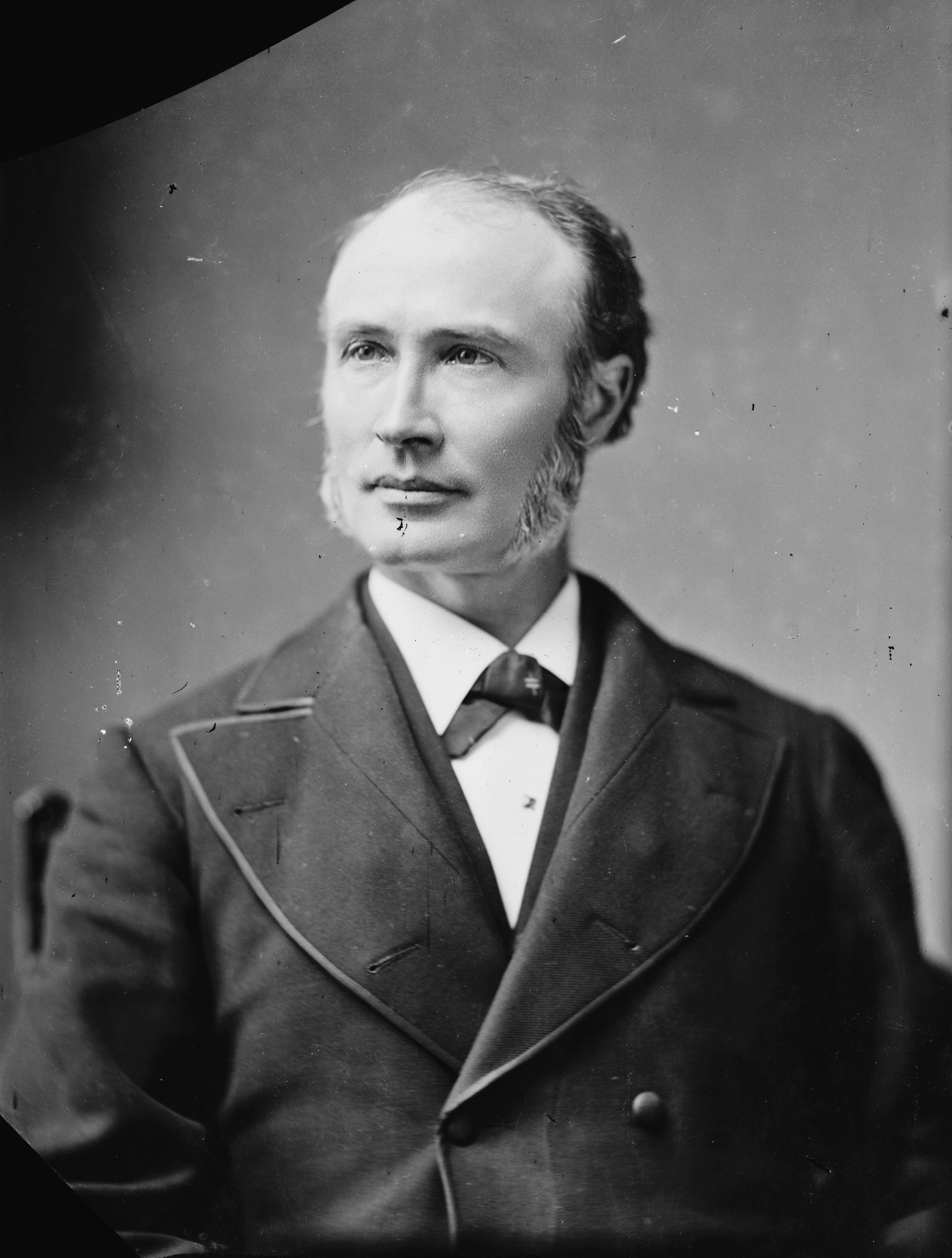

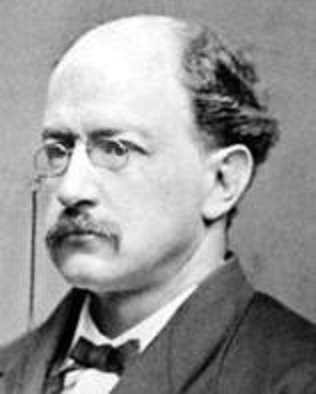

Nominee	William Claflin	John Quincy Adams II	Edwin Chamberlain
Party	Republican	Democratic	Labor Reform
Popular vote	74,106	50,735	13,567
Percentage	53.50%	36.63%	9.80%
- County results Claflin: 40–50% 50–60% 60–70% 70–80% 80–90% Adams: 50–60%
Governor before election
William Clafin
Republican
Elected Governor
William Clafin
Republican

The 1869 Massachusetts gubernatorial election was held on November 2.

Governor William Clafin was re-elected to a second consecutive one-year term, defeating Democrat John Quincy Adams II and Edwin Chamberlain, the nominee of the new Labor Reform Party.

== General election ==
=== Candidates ===
- John Quincy Adams II, former state representative from Quincy and nominee for governor in 1868 (Democratic)
- Edwin Chamberlain (Labor Reform)
- William Claflin, incumbent governor (Republican)

=== Results ===
1869 Massachusetts gubernatorial election
Party	Candidate	Votes	%	±%
Republican	William Claflin (incumbent)	74,106	53.50%	▼14.09
Democratic	John Quincy Adams II	50,735	36.63%	▲4.26
Labor Reform	Edwin Chamberlain	13,567	9.80%	N/A
Write-in		102	0.07%	▲0.03
Total votes		138,510	100.00%	
Republican hold		Swing		

== See also ==
- 1869 Massachusetts legislature
