= Senator Bates =

Senator Bates may refer to:

- Alan Bates (politician) (1945–2016), Oregon State Senate
- David Bates (Rhode Island politician) (born 1941), Rhode Island State Senate
- Edward Bates (1793–1869), Missouri State Senate
- Erastus Newton Bates (1828–1898), Minnesota State Senate
- Gail H. Bates (born 1945), Maryland State Senate
- Henry C. Bates (1843–1909), Vermont State Senate
- Henry M. Bates (1808–1865), Vermont State Senate
- Isaac C. Bates (1779–1845), Massachusetts State Senate
- Joshua Hall Bates (1817–1908), Ohio State Senate
- Martin W. Bates (1786–1869), U.S. Senator from Delaware
- Patricia Bates (born 1939), California State Senate
- Sanford Bates (1884–1982), Massachusetts State Senate
- William Gelston Bates (1803–1880), Massachusetts State Senate

== See also ==
- William B. Bate (1826–1905), U.S. Senator from New Jersey from 1807 to 1905
- William J. Bate (1934–2011), New Jersey State Senate
