= Building at 1–6 Walnut Terrace =

- U.S. National Register of Historic Places
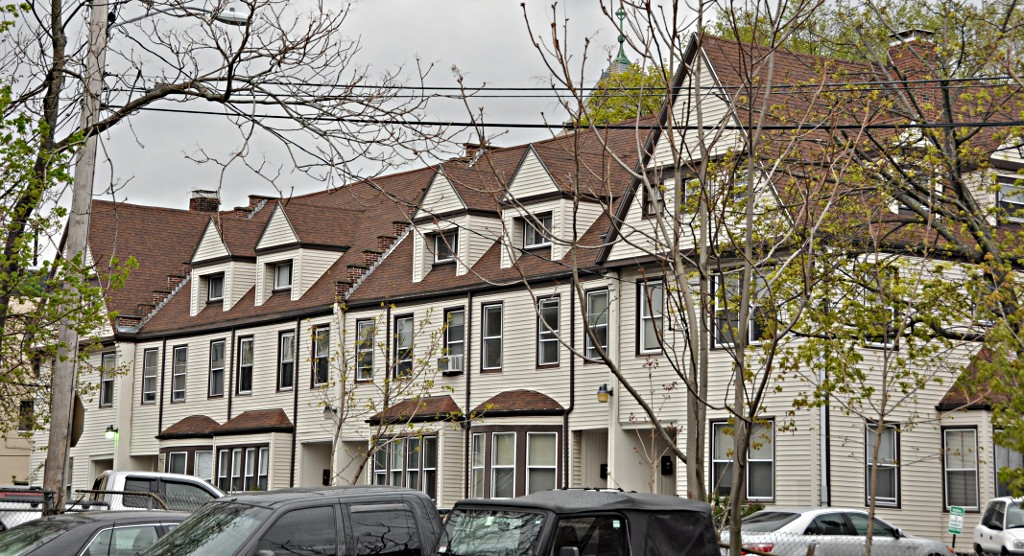

- Location within Massachusetts Location within the United States
- Location: 1–6 Walnut Terr., Newton, Massachusetts
- Coordinates: 42°21′09.5″N 71°12′25.0″W
- Area: less than one acre
- Built: 1887
- Architectural style: Queen Anne, Shingle Style
- MPS: Newton MRA
- NRHP reference No.: 86001779
- Added to NRHP: September 04, 1986

1–6 Walnut Terrace in the Newtonville village of Newton, Massachusetts is a distinctive Shingle style rowhouse. Built in 1887, it is one of the city's few examples of a 19th-century rowhouse. The building was listed on the National Register of Historic Places in 1986.

== Description and history ==
Walnut Terrace is a short spur road on the north side of Newtonville, extending from Central Avenue in the east to the rear of a commercial block fronting onto Walnut Street, one of the village's commercial thoroughfares. It is little more than an access drive for this rowhouse, which is on its north side. It is a wood frame building, with three brick firewalls, stepped at the tops, separating it into four sections. The end sections have front-facing gabled roofs with gabled dormers at the ends, while the center sections have side-gable roofs with dormers that have recessed windows. The two center units have single-story projecting rectangular bays, while the units flanking those have projecting rounded bays. The deeply recessed entries were originally Queen Anne in style, with sidelight and transom windows, but have modernized.

The rowhouse was built in 1887 by William Claflin, a Newtonville resident and former Governor of Massachusetts. He was also one of Newtonville's principal real estate developers, owning a number of commercial and residential properties in the village. This is the oldest multiunit housing of its type in Newton, most of whose housing stock is less densely built single-family residences.

== See also ==
- National Register of Historic Places listings in Newton, Massachusetts
