= 1866 Massachusetts gubernatorial election =

- November 6, 1866
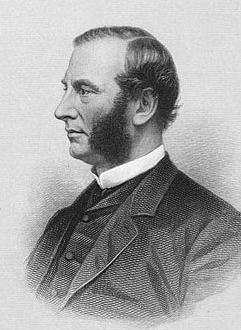

Nominee	Alexander Bullock	Theodore Sweetser
Party	Republican	Democratic
Popular vote	91,980	26,671
Percentage	77.46%	22.46%
- County results Bullock: 60–70% 70–80% 80–90% >90%
Governor before election
Alexander Bullock
Republican
Elected Governor
Alexander Bullock
Republican

The 1866 Massachusetts gubernatorial election was held on November 6.

Governor Alexander Bullock was re-elected to a second term in office, defeating Democrat Theodore Sweetser.

== General election ==
=== Candidates ===
- Alexander Bullock, incumbent governor (Republican)
- Theodore Sweetser (Democratic)

=== Results ===
1866 Massachusetts gubernatorial election
Party	Candidate	Votes	%	±%
Republican	Alexander Bullock (incumbent)	91,980	77.46%	▲0.90
Democratic	Theodore Sweetser	26,671	22.46%	▼0.81
Write-in		100	0.08%	▼0.10
Total votes		118,751	100.00%	
Republican hold		Swing		

== See also ==
- 1866 Massachusetts legislature
