= 1870 Massachusetts gubernatorial election =

- November 8, 1870
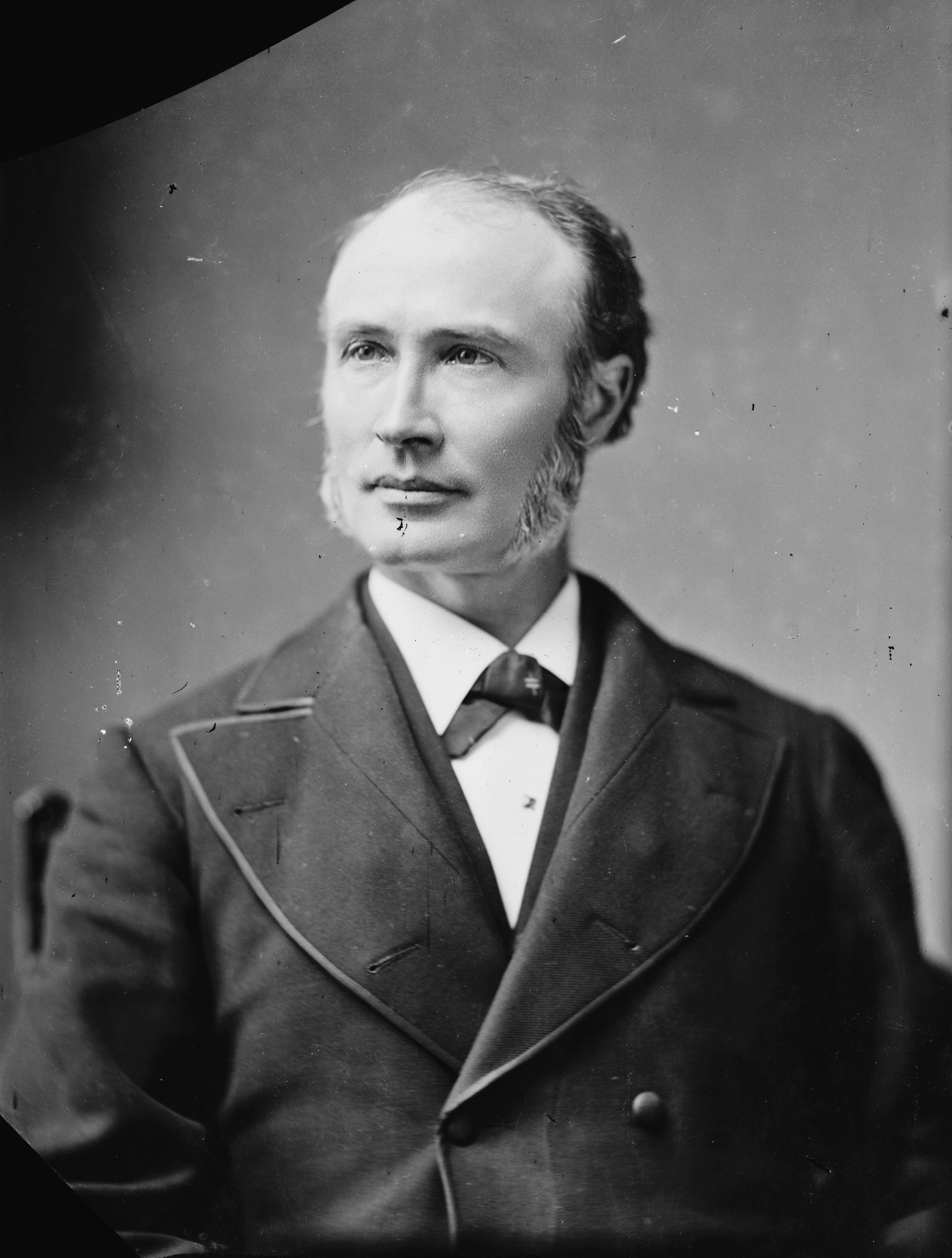

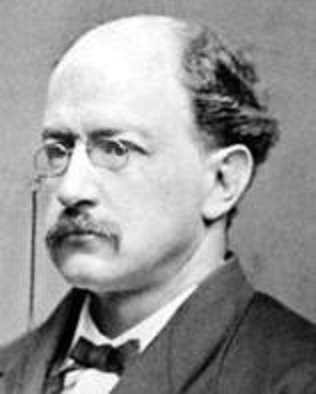

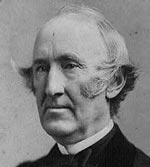
Nominee	William Claflin	John Quincy Adams II	Wendell Phillips
Party	Republican	Democratic	Labor Reform
Popular vote	79,549	48,680	21,946
Percentage	52.90%	32.37%	14.59%
- County results Claflin: 40–50% 50–60% 60–70% 70–80% 80–90%
Governor before election
William Clafin
Republican
Elected Governor
William Clafin
Republican

The 1870 Massachusetts gubernatorial election was held on November 8.

Governor William Clafin was re-elected to a third consecutive one-year term, defeating Democrat John Quincy Adams II and abolitionist attorney Wendell Phillips, running on the Labor Reform ticket.

In the concurrent but separate election for lieutenant governor, Republican Joseph Tucker was also re-elected to a third term.

== General election ==
=== Candidates ===
- John Quincy Adams II, former state representative from Quincy and nominee for governor in 1868 and 1869
- William Claflin, incumbent governor since 1869 (Republican)
- Wendell Phillips, abolitionist and activist (Labor Reform)

=== Results ===
1870 Massachusetts gubernatorial election
Party	Candidate	Votes	%	±%
Republican	William Claflin (incumbent)	79,549	52.90%	▼0.60
Democratic	John Quincy Adams II	48,680	32.37%	▼4.26
Labor Reform	Wendell Phillips	21,946	14.59%	▲4.79
Write-in		206	0.14%	▲0.07
Republican hold		Swing		

== See also ==
- 1870 Massachusetts legislature
