= George Merrick Rice =

American politician

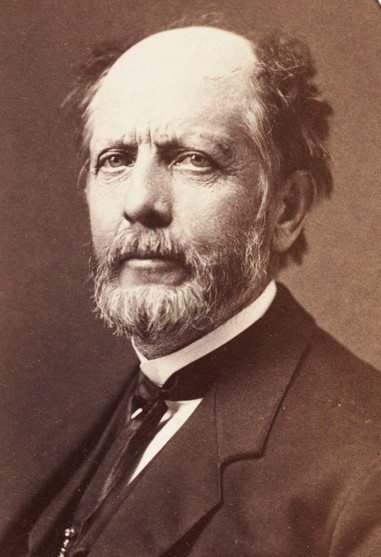
- George Merrick Rice 1870

Member of the Massachusetts Senate from the Worcester district
- In office 1869–1870

Personal details
- Born: November 20, 1808 West Brookfield, Massachusetts, US
- Died: November 10, 1894 (aged 85) Worcester, Massachusetts, US
- Party: Republican
- Spouse: Ruth Jane (White) Rice (m. 23 Jan 1832)
- Children: George Merrick Rice, Jr. (b. 1833); Henrietta Hurd (Rice) Vassar (b. 15 Mar 1840); Elizabeth Frances Jane (Rice) Holmes (b. 15 Nov 1841); Mary Louisa (Rice) Hunt (b. 4 Aug 1848).
- Profession: businessman, banker, state legislator

George Merrick Rice (November 20, 1808 – November 10, 1894) was an American businessman from Worcester, Massachusetts, who had a varied career in dry goods and grain retailing and the manufacture of industrial machinery. He was a pioneer in the steel industry. He was also a banker, serving as president of the Worcester Safe Deposit and Trust Company. He was president of the Worcester Common Council for three years and a member of the Massachusetts State Senate from 1869 to 1870.

== Biography ==
George Merrick Rice was born in West Brookfield, Massachusetts, on 20 Nov 1808 to Col. Samuel Buckminster Rice and Abigail (Bradish) Rice. He attended public schools in West Brookfield, and after serving as a clerk for a few years at a country store in Leicester, Massachusetts, he moved to Worcester in 1829 and became a partner in the dry goods firm Andrew, March and Company. Shortly afterwards, in 1830, he purchased the dry goods business of Burt and Merrick, and a few years later, he purchased a flour and grain store near the end of the Blackstone Canal in Worcester. In 1846, he became a partner in the firm of Howe, Goddard and Company (H.P. Howe and Isaac Goddard) in the manufacture of calico printing and bleaching machinery. This company eventually became the Rice, Barton, and Fales Machinery and Iron Company. He became president of the Worcester Steel Works in 1882 and installed a Bessemer steel plant in 1884, with expanded operations producing as much as 230 tons of steel per day after the addition of an open hearth steel furnace. The business operated for 30 years in Worcester and was one of the largest businesses in the city, entering bankruptcy in 1890. He also served as president of the Worcester Safe Deposit and Trust Company and president of the Manufacturers Mutual Insurance Company.

Rice was active in Republican Party politics in Massachusetts, serving on the Worcester Common Council and as its President for three years. He was elected to the Massachusetts Senate in the elections of 1868, serving from 1869 to 1870, and was very active in the temperance movement. He died on 10 Nov 1894 in Worcester, Massachusetts.

== Family relations ==
Rice was a direct descendant of Edmund Rice, an early immigrant to Massachusetts Bay Colony, as follows: His father, Col. Samuel Buckminster Rice, was a member of the Massachusetts militia and a Massachusetts State Representative in 1813 and 1816.

- George Merrick Rice, son of

- Col. Samuel Buckminster Rice (1760–1828), son of
- Capt. Tilly Rice (1724–1803), son of

- Obadiah Rice (1698–1761), son of
- Jacob Rice (1660–1746), son of
- Edward Rice (1622–1712), son of

- Edmund Rice (c.1594–1663)

== See also ==
- 1869 Massachusetts legislature
- 1870 Massachusetts legislature
