= 1869 Massachusetts legislature =

90th Massachusetts General Court
←	89th	91st	→

Overview
- Legislative body: General Court
- Election: November 3, 1868

Senate
- Members: 40
- President: George O. Brastow
- Party control: Republican (38 Republicans, 2 Democrats)

House
- Members: 240
- Speaker: Harvey Jewell
- Party control: Republican (224 Republicans, 16 Democrats)

Sessions
- 1st: January 6, 1869 – June 24, 1869

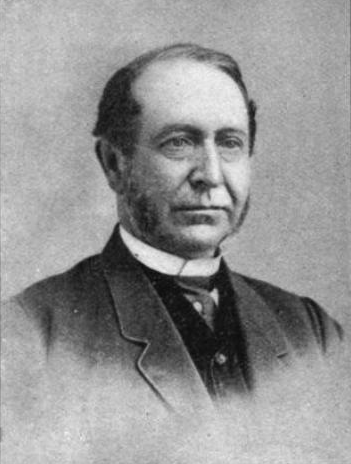
George Brastow, Senate president.

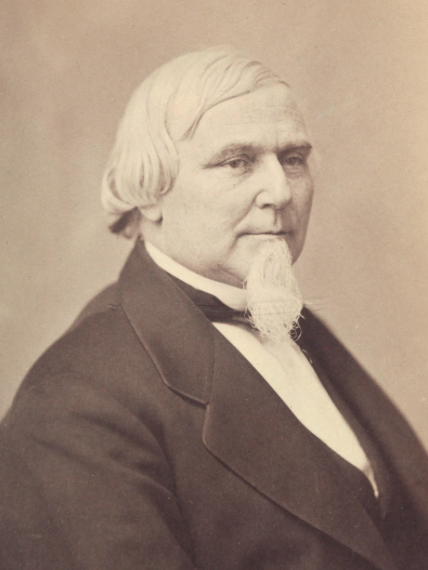
Harvey Jewell, House speaker.

Leaders of the Massachusetts General Court, 1869.

The 90th Massachusetts General Court, consisting of the Massachusetts Senate and the Massachusetts House of Representatives, met in 1869 during the governorship of Republican William Claflin. George O. Brastow and Robert Carter Pitman served as presidents of the Senate and Harvey Jewell served as speaker of the House.

Notable events include the creation of a Joint Special Committee on Woman Suffrage.

== Senators ==
Image	Name	Date of birth	District	Party
	Nathaniel Ellis Atwood	September 13, 1807		
	George Oliver Brastow	1811		
	George Marshall Buttrick	1822		
	Horace Hopkins Coolidge	February 11, 1832		
	Samuel Dexter Crane	1816		
	Benjamin Dean	August 22, 1824		
	Francis Henshaw Dewey	1821		
	Edmund Dowse	1813		
	Alonzo Madison Giles	February 25, 1821		
	Whiting Griswold	November 12, 1814		
	John Brown Hathaway	1809		
	Francis Allen Hobart	1833		
	Nathaniel Jay Holden	1827		
	Estes Howe	1814		
	George Augustus King	1834		
	Richmond Kingman	1821		
	Charles James Kittredge	1818		
	Lucius James Knowles	1819		
	Charles Rensselaer Ladd	April 9, 1822		
	John Hyde Lockey	1822		
	Charles Marsh	1818		
	Joshua Newell Marshall	1830		
	Charles Rankin McLean	1824		
	George Harris Monroe	1826		
	Ellis Wesley Morton	1840		
	Daniel Needham	1822		
	Julius Auboyneau Palmer	1803		
	Robert Carter Pitman	March 16, 1825		
	Richard Plumer	1813		
	Joseph Greeley Pollard	1833		
	Joseph Gorton Ray	1831		
	George Merrick Rice	November 20, 1808		
	Oliver Hazard Perry Smith	1824		
	George H. Sweetser	1823		
	George Sylvester Taylor	March 2, 1822		
	Edward Augustus Thomas	1829		
	Joseph Scott Todd	1828		
	Harrison Tweed	1806		
	Gershom Bradford Weston	August 27, 1799		
	Charles Augustus Wheelock	1812		
	Jonathan White	1819		

== Representatives ==
- William T. Adams
- Alexander H. Allen
- John Allen
- William W. Amadon
- Frank M. Ames
- Isaac A. Anthony
- E. Foster Bailey
- John I. Baker
- Life Baldwin
- Henry Barker
- John Barlow
- William E. Barnes
- George H. Barrett
- William Bartlett
- Ezra Batcheller
- Jacob Bates
- Loring Bates
- Marcus Bates
- Alfred Belden
- Francis W. Bird
- Henry B. Blake
- Richard D. Blinn
- Samuel G. Bowdlear
- Charles Bradley
- Samuel P. Breed
- Ezra C. Brett
- Benjamin A. Bridges
- Jethro C. Brock
- William G. Brooks
- John Brown
- Obadiah S. Brown
- Werden R. Brown
- Ferdinand L. Burley
- Alvah A. Burrage
- Alfred A. Burrill
- Frederick Butler
- Oliver S. Butler
- Michael Carney
- Solomon Carter
- Dennis Cawley, Jr
- Albert Chamberlin
- Henry Chase
- Linus M. Child
- William M. Child
- Horace Choate
- Le Baron B. Church
- Joseph N. Clark
- Samuel Clark
- Asa Clement
- Samuel Cloon
- Aury G. Coes
- Patrick A. Collins
- Benjamin F. Cook
- George P. Cox
- Freeborn W. Cressey
- Alanson Crittenden
- Stephen M. Crosby
- James M. Cunliff
- Robert S. Daniels
- Elnathan Davis
- William W. Davis
- Ebenezer Dawes
- John Dean
- Avery J. Denison
- Benjamin Dupar
- J. Franklin Dyer
- William I. Edwards
- Thomas Ellis
- Addison G. Fay
- Jacob Fisher
- Charles A. Fiske
- William Fletcher
- James B. Francis
- Benjamin Franklin
- Rodney French
- Josiah O. Friend, Jr
- Chauncey G. Fuller
- George L. Gibbs
- Edwin Gilbert
- Kimball C. Gleason
- Abijah W. Goddard
- Stephen D. Goddard
- John B. Goodrich
- Thomas H. Goodspeed
- Dennis J. Gorman
- Levi S. Gould
- Samuel H. Gould
- Wesley A. Gove
- William T. Grammar
- C. S. Greenwood
- Charles H. Guild
- Moses H. Hale
- Lyman S. Hapgood
- R. P. A. Harris
- Abraham G. Hart
- Edward H. Hartshorn
- Andrew L. Haskell
- William H. Haskell
- Tilly Haynes
- James A. Hervey
- James Hewes
- Elmer Hewett
- Charles A. Hewins
- William Hichborn
- Levi W. Hobart
- Thorndike D. Hodges
- Ambrous Hodgkins
- Alvah Holway
- James Horswell
- Samuel Horton
- Charles H. Hovey
- George F. Howland
- James Humphrey
- Theodore C. Hurd
- Harvey Jewell
- Henri L. Johnson
- Robert Johnson
- Herbert C. Joyner
- Lewis S. Judd
- Shubael B. Kelley
- William W. Kellogg
- Thomas G. Kent
- Moses Kimball
- Dexter S. King
- Enoch King
- Daniel W. Knight
- Joseph S. Knight
- Franklin C. Knox
- David Lane
- Albert Langdon
- Roger H. Leavitt
- Manning Leonard
- Nahum Leonard, Jr
- William Livermore
- Caleb Lombard
- Josiah Lord, Jr
- Marcus M. Luther
- Charles P. Lyon
- Hugh A. Madden
- Charles N. Marsh
- Murdock Matheson
- Charles J. Mclntire
- William Melcher
- William R. Melden
- Charles H. Merriam
- John M. Merrick
- Moody Merrill
- William H. Merritt
- Lansing Millis
- Eben Mitchell
- Elliott Montague
- Lyman E. Moore
- Asa P. Morse
- F. H. Morse
- James R. Morse
- Newton Morse
- Edwin Mudge
- Nathaniel C. Nash
- Henry J. Nazro
- Thomas L. Nelson
- Daniel H. Newton
- Jeremiah L. Newton
- George K. Nichols
- William W. Nichols
- Francis A. Nye
- John P. Ober
- Weaver Osborn
- Rufus S. Owen
- Samuel S. Paine
- William H. Parker
- John C. Peak
- Joseph D. Peirce
- Francis A. Perry
- M. C. Phipps
- A. A. Plimpton
- Avery Plumer
- Thomas F. Plunkett
- Thomas K. Plunkett
- Augustus Pratt
- Joseph A. Priest
- Asabel D. Puffer
- Caleb Rand
- Eduar H. Reed
- Ezra Rice
- Otis Rich
- James Ritchie
- James H. Roberts
- Isaiah F. Robinson
- Ensign B. Rogers
- Joseph N. Rolfe
- John Runey
- Augustine K. Russell
- William A. Russell
- George J. Sanger
- Joseph L. Sargent
- Samuel D. Sawin
- Clark Sears
- John N. Sherman
- Lemuel B. Simmons
- Rufus S. Slade
- Abner L. Smith
- Edward Smith
- Horace Smith
- Iram Smith
- John J. Smith
- Martin L. Smith
- Willis Smith
- Charles W. Soule
- Welcome W. Sprague
- L. Miles Standish
- Haynes K. Starkweather
- Eliphalet Stone
- Edward Stowell
- Joseph A. Stranger
- Ruel F. Thayer
- Shepherd Thayer
- Justus Tower
- S. K. Towle
- William P. Tyler
- Joseph Vaill
- Welcome H. Wales
- S. H. Walker
- Royal S. Warren
- Thomas S. Waters
- Jerome Wells
- Henry White
- D. Dwight Whitmore
- Emerson Wight
- Charles Wilcox
- Salem Wilder
- Alfred M. Williams
- Warren Williams
- Samuel S. Willson
- James Wilson
- William D. Witherell
- Orlow Wolcott
- George M. Woodward
- David T. Woodwell
- Luther A. Wright
- P. Ambrose Young

== See also ==
- 41st United States Congress
- List of Massachusetts General Courts
