= John Michael Tobin =

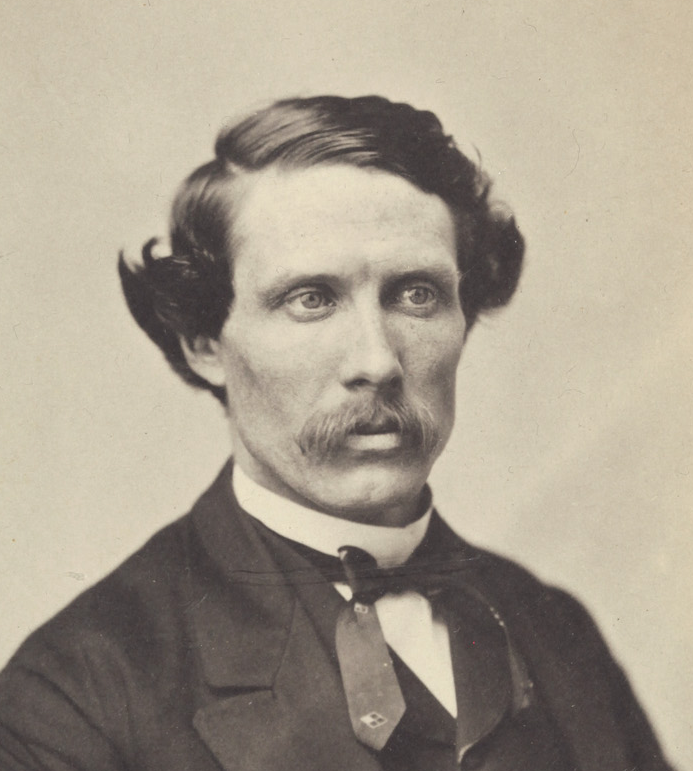
- Portrait of John Michael Tobin
- Born: 1841; County Waterford, Ireland
- Died: December 27, 1898; Knoxville, Tennessee, US
- Burial place: Mount Auburn Cemetery, Cambridge, Massachusetts
- Military career
- Allegiance: United States; Union
- Branch: United States Army; Union Army
- Service years: 1861–1864
- Rank: Captain
- Unit: 9th Massachusetts Infantry
- Conflicts: American Civil War; *Battle of Malvern Hill
- Awards: Medal of Honor

John Michael Tobin (1835 or 1841–1898) was an officer in the Union Army who received the Medal of Honor for his actions at the Battle of Malvern Hill during the American Civil War.

== Biography ==
John Tobin was born in County Kilkenny, Ireland, in 1835 or 1841. He was commissioned as an officer of the 9th Massachusetts Infantry from Boston Massachusetts in June 1861. He served as regimental adjutant from January to August 1862, and mustered out with his regiment as a captain in June 1864. Tobin received the Medal of Honor for his actions on July 1, 1862 at the Battle of Malvern Hill during the Peninsula Campaign.

Captain Tobin was a Companion of the Massachusetts Commandery of the Military Order of the Loyal Legion of the United States.

Tobin is buried at Mount Auburn Cemetery in Cambridge, Massachusetts.

== Medal of Honor citation ==
Rank and organization: First Lieutenant and Adjutant, 9th Massachusetts Infantry. Place and date: At Malvern Hill, Va., July 1, 1862. Entered service at: Boston, Mass. Birth: Ireland. Date of issue: March 11, 1896.

Citation:

Voluntarily took command of the 9th Massachusetts while adjutant, bravely fighting from 3 p.m. until dusk, rallying and re_forming the regiment under fire; twice picked up the regimental flag, the color bearer having been shot down, and placed it in worthy hands.

== See also ==
- 1868 Massachusetts legislature
- List of Medal of Honor recipients
- List of American Civil War Medal of Honor recipients: T–Z
