= Martin Brimmer (1829–1896) =

First director of the Boston Museum of Fine Arts

Martin Brimmer II
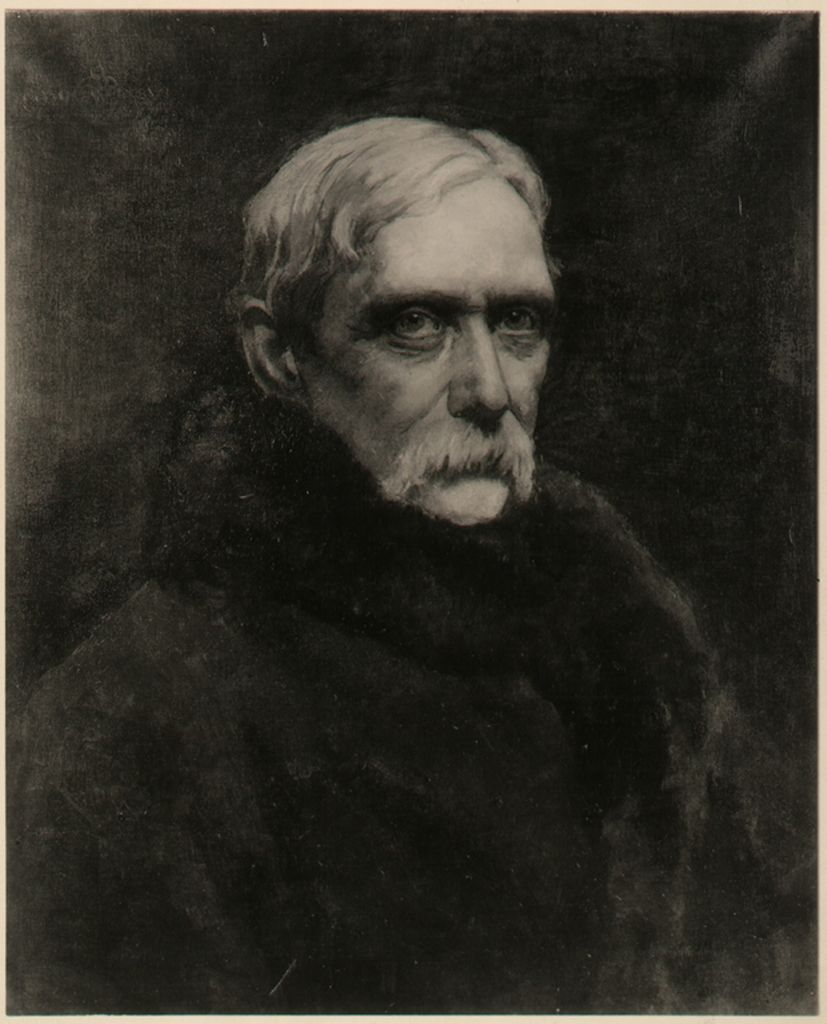
- Portrait by Sarah Wyman Whitman c. 1896

Member of the Massachusetts Senate from the 3rd Suffolk district
- In office January 6, 1864 – January 4, 1865
- Preceded by: Peter Harvey
- Succeeded by: Francis E. Parker

Member of the Massachusetts House of Representatives from the 6th Suffolk district
- In office January 5, 1859 – January 2, 1861 Serving with Thornton K. Lothrop (1859)
- Preceded by: John Albion Andrew; George P. Clapp

Personal details
- Born: December 9, 1829 Boston, Massachusetts
- Died: January 14, 1896 (aged 66) Boston, Massachusetts
- Party: Republican

Martin Brimmer (December 9, 1829 – January 14, 1896) was an American politician and first president of the Museum of Fine Arts, Boston.

== Early life ==
Martin Brimmer was born in Boston on December 9, 1829, the son of Martin Brimmer, Mayor of Boston. He started his studies at Harvard University and graduated in 1849.

== Career ==
He was a member of the Massachusetts House of Representatives from 1859 to 1861 and the Massachusetts State Senate in 1864. He was a presidential elector in the US election of 1876. He also served on the Citizens' Relief Committee following the Great Boston Fire of 1872.

He died in Boston on January 14, 1896.

== See also ==
- 85th Massachusetts General Court (1864)
