= 1868 Massachusetts legislature =

89th Massachusetts General Court
←	88th	90th	→

Overview
- Legislative body: General Court
- Election: November 5, 1867

Senate
- Members: 40
- President: George O. Brastow
- Party control: Republican (30 R, 10 D)

House
- Members: 240
- Speaker: Harvey Jewell
- Party control: Republican (180 R, 60 D)

Sessions
- 1st: January 1, 1868 – June 12, 1868

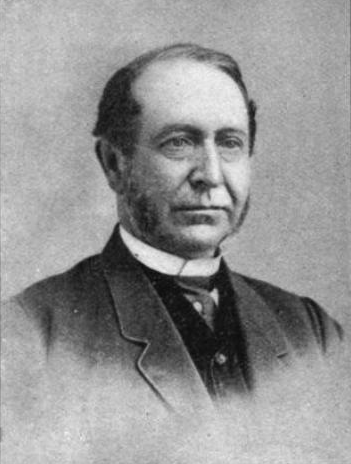
George Brastow, Senate president.

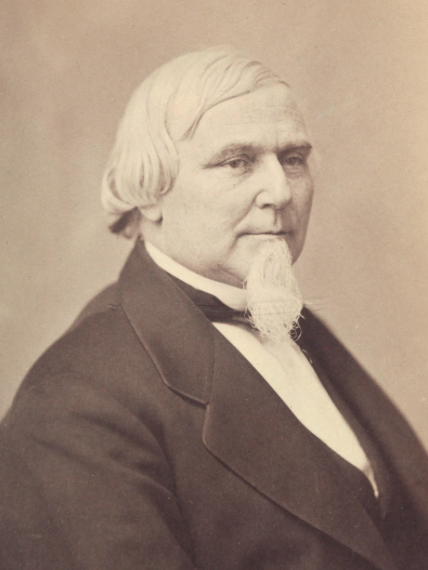
Harvey Jewell, House speaker.

Leaders of the Massachusetts General Court, 1868.

The 89th Massachusetts General Court, consisting of the Massachusetts Senate and the Massachusetts House of Representatives, met in 1868 during the governorship of Republican Alexander Bullock. George O. Brastow served as president of the Senate and Harvey Jewell served as speaker of the House.

== Senators ==
Image	Name	Date of birth	District	Party
	Edward Avery	March 12, 1828	Norfolk and Plymouth Counties, Norfolk & Plymouth district	
	Samuel Wells Bowerman	May 10, 1830	Berkshire and Hampshire Counties, Berkshire district	
	George Oliver Brastow	September 8, 1811	Middlesex County, second district	
	Silas Newton Brooks	December 30, 1825	Franklin County, Franklin district	
	Frederick Davis Brown	September 5, 1824	Worcester County, third district	
	Samuel Angier Chace	December 7, 1820	Bristol County, third district	
	Knowlton Sampson Chaffee	July 11, 1814	Middlesex County, third district	
	Tracy Patch Cheever	March 28, 1824	Suffolk County, first district	
	Lee Claflin	November 19, 1791	Middlesex County, fourth district	
	Benjamin Franklin Clark	February 23, 1808	Middlesex County, seventh district	
	Samuel Dexter Crane	June 14, 1816	Suffolk County, fifth district	
	Edward Crocker	March 16, 1814	Norfolk and Plymouth Counties, second Plymouth district	
	Charles Chase Dame	June 5, 1819	Essex County, fourth district	
	Francis B. Fay	June 12, 1793	Worcester County, fifth district	
	Henry Fuller	July 17, 1825	Hampden County, second district	
	William Gaston	October 3, 1820	Norfolk and Plymouth Counties, first Norfolk district	
	Alonzo Madison Giles	February 25, 1821	Suffolk County, second district	
	Erasmus Gould	June 23, 1817	Barnstable, Nantucket, and Dukes Counties, Island district	
	Andrew Malcolm McPhail, Jr.	February 28, 1817	Suffolk County, fourth district	
	John Green Mudge	March 26, 1823	Worcester County, fourth district	
	Daniel Needham	May 24, 1822	Middlesex County, fifth district	
	James Oliver	May 30, 1820	Middlesex County, sixth district	
	Clark Partridge	April 1, 1809	Norfolk and Plymouth Counties, third Norfolk district	
	George Penniman	July 10, 1810	Norfolk and Plymouth Counties, second Norfolk district	
	Lucius Wilson Pond	April 20, 1826	Worcester County, first district	
	Edmund Houghton Sawyer	November 16, 1821	Berkshire and Hampshire Counties, Hampshire district	
	William Schouler	December 31, 1814	Essex County, first district	
	Oliver Hazard Perry Smith	July 8, 1824	Middlesex County, first district	
	Chester Snow	October 11, 1817	Barnstable, Nantucket, and Dukes Counties, Cape district	
	Moses Tyler Stevens	October 10, 1825	Essex County, third district	
	William Sutton	July 26, 1800	Essex County, second district	
	Joseph Scott Todd	July 6, 1828	Essex County, fifth district	
	Harrison Tweed	February 17, 1806	Bristol County, first district	
	Gershom Bradford Weston	August 27, 1799	Norfolk and Plymouth Counties, first Plymouth district	
	Jonathan Dodge Wheeler	August 4, 1806	Worcester County, second district	
	Marshall Wilcox	March 19, 1821	Berkshire and Hampshire Counties, Berkshire & Hampshire district	

== Representatives ==
image	Name	Date of birth	District	Party
	Levi Augustus Abbott	1824		
	John Quincy Adams II	September 22, 1833		
	Rufus Adams	1829		
	George Ellis Allen	1817		
	Samuel Appleton	1841		
	Elisha Watson Arnold	1837		
	William Frederick Arnold	1815		
	John Henry Bangs	1829		
	William Barker	1820		
	Henry Bassett	1820		
	William Gelston Bates	November 17, 1803		
	Irving Bates	1839		
	Phineas Alden Beaman	1819		
	Hugh Ramsey Bean	1820		
	Charles Bird	1829		
	Charles Chauncey Bixby	1824		
	Willard Blackinton	1800		
	Charles Henry Blanchard	1828		
	John Currier Blasdell	1809		
	Albert Blood	1818		
	Morton Van Buren Bonney	1841		
	Charles Bradley	1816		
	George Egbert Bridges	1827		
	Oliver Hazard Perry Brown	1813		
	Ralph Steele Brown	1828		
	William Blanchard Brown	1821		
	Ezra Plummer Brownell	1819		
	John Richards Bullard	1846		
	William Henry Burbeck	1822		
	Hodgdon Fowler Buzzell	1834		
	James Capen	1823		
	Thomas Hale Carruth	1810		
	Dennis Cawley	1834		
	Jonas Allen Champney	1831		
	Philo Chapin	1806		
	Charles William Chase	1822		
	Heman Baker Chase	1825		
	Linus Mason Child	1835		
	Henry Martyn Clarke	1826		
	Patrick Andrew Collins	March 12, 1844		
	Benjamin Franklin Cook	1833		
	Henry Harvey Cook	1804		
	Lament Bacon Corbin	1813		
	Joseph Warren Cornell	1810		
	George Parker Cox	1814		
	Orlando Bradford Crane	1835		
	Alanson Crittenden	1814		
	Thomas Cunningham	1826		
	David Cushing	1813		
	Francis Everett Cushing	1825		
	Richard Henry Dana	August 1, 1815		
	George Keith Daniell	1810		
	Leander Sloan Daniels	1834		
	Curtis Davis	1814		
	Jeremy Bentham Dennett	1833		
	Thaddeus Kingsley DeWolf	1801		
	Charles Henry Drew	1838		
	Silas Dunton	1818		
	Moses Farnum	1826		
	Thomas Joseph Fay	1832		
	Stephen Chapman Felton	1835		
	Frederick William Field	1819		
	Samuel Tobey Field	1820		
	Thomas Jackson Field	1822		
	Charles Henry Fiske	1840		
	Ezra Hastings Flagg	1823		
	John Dana Flagg	1817		
	James Turner Ford	1827		
	Dudley Foster	1809		
	James Augustus Fox	August 11, 1827		
	Charles Amasa Fox	1832		
	James Bicheno Francis	May 18, 1815		
	Andrew Jackson Freeman	1819		
	Samuel Freeman	1830		
	Josiah Ober Friend	1835		
	Roscoe Wisner Gage	1839		
	Thomas John Gargan	1844		
	Josiah Gates	1805		
	Noah Murray Gaylord	1822		
	Delano Alexander Goddard	1831		
	Levi Swanton Gould	March 27, 1831		
	Samuel Herrick Gould	1814		
	John Otis Hale	1831		
	Josiah Sturtevant Hammond	1810		
	Abraham Gifford Hart	1831		
	David Dexter Hart	1819		
	Joseph Hall Hathaway	1812		
	James Aigin Hervey	1828		
	Charles Amasa Hewins	1822		
	Charles Heywood	1831		
	George Washington Heywood	1829		
	Noble Hind Hill	1821		
	George Miller Hobbs	1827		
	Alvah Holway	1809		
	Anson Parker Hooker	1829		
	Daniel Howard	1823		
	Solomon Henry Howe	1821		
	William Howland	1822		
	John Avery Hughes	1822		
	Edward Alden Hulbert	1824		
	Jacob Randall Huntington	1829		
	Melville E. Ingalls	1842		
	George Washington Jackman	1814		
	Harvey Jewell	May 26, 1820		
	William Drury Jones	1815		
	Lewis Strong Judd	1827		
	William Wallace Kellogg	1824		
	Dexter S. King	1806		
	William Alonzo King	1822		
	Richmond Kingman	1821		
	Charles James Kittredge	1818		
	William Knowlton	1809		
	Augustus Lane	1818		
	Howard Malcom Lane	1833		
	Edward Howard Lathrop	1838		
	Roger Hooker Leavitt	July 21, 1805		
	Joseph Leavitt	1802		
	John Lee	1813		
	Job Mason Leonard	1824		
	John Livermore	1813		
	James Lovering Locke	1832		
	George Howard Long	1842		
	Willard Mann	1818		
	James Fisk Mansfield	1837		
	John Manson	1805		
	Murdock Matheson	1827		
	John McDuffie	1828		
	Wallace McFarland	1825		
	William McFarlin	1806		
	Leonard McKenzie	1815		
	Isaac Hall Meserve	1813		
	William Mixter	1809		
	Frederick Augustus Morey	1840		
	Amasa Childs Morse	1833		
	Ellis Wesley Morton	1840		
	Edwin Mudge	1818		
	Nathaniel Cushing Nash	1804		
	Henry Newton	1811		
	John Pond Ordway	August 1, 1824		
	Weaver Osborn	1815		
	George Henry Peirson	1816		
	Simeon Perkins	1801		
	John Perley	1808		
	George Phipps	1802		
	Edward Henry Pierce	1841		
	Jonathan Pierce	1815		
	Thomas Fitzpatrick Plunkett	1804		
	Henry Eliphalet Pond	1823		
	Moses Pool	1815		
	Henry Smith Porter	1821		
	Joseph Samson Potter	1822		
	Nathan Parker Pratt	1811		
	Benjamin Proctor	1811		
	Caleb Rand	1817		
	Henry Sears Ranney	1817		
	Alvah Raymond	1829		
	William Hathaway Reynard	1808		
	Jeremiah A. Rich	1823		
	Otis Rich	1806		
	Eleazer Richmond	1804		
	John Howe Robinson	1809		
	Ensign Bassett Rogers	1825		
	Joseph Ross	1822		
	Edward Hutchins Robbins Ruggles	1800		
	Otis Taft Ruggles	1829		
	John Runey	1814		
	George Sanford	1830		
	William Seaver	1806		
	William Seaver	1818		
	William Robert Sessions	1835		
	Charles Luther Shaw	1823		
	William Sherburne	1825		
	Henry Shortle	1834		
	Hiram Smith Shurtleff	1841		
	Lemuel Bacon Simmons	1802		
	Iram Smith	1807		
	John James Smith	1825		
	Oliver W. Smith	1828		
	Edwin Nathaniel Snow	1828		
	Henry Souther	1810		
	Walter Scott Sprague	1835		
	Charles Stanwood	1816		
	Isaac Holden Stearns	1825		
	John Warren Stevens	1833		
	Walter Briggs Studley	1827		
	John Howland Swain	1823		
	John Kemble Tarbox	May 6, 1838		
	James Gardner Tewksbury	1828		
	Shepard Thayer	1827		
	Prescott Alexander Thompson	1825		
	Hubbard Winslow Tilton	1835		
	John Michael Tobin	1841		
	Dexter Alley Tompkins	1827		
	Samuel Knapp Towle	1829		
	George Edwin Towne	1829		
	Jacob Perkins Towne	1803		
	Charles Russell Train	October 18, 1817		
	Mason Van Deusen	1802		
	Eden Wadsworth	1793		
	William Henry Waitt	1819		
	Aaron Gifford Walker	1815		
	George Walker	1824		
	Levi Wallace	1831		
	Horace Ward	1819		
	Eben Nichols Wardwell	1825		
	Francis Warland Warren	1819		
	Royal Sibley Warren	1822		
	Thomas Shales Waters	1818		
	Willard Wheeler	1804		
	Rufus A. White	1840		
	Windsor Newton White	1823		
	Sydney Franklin Whitehouse	1822		
	William Whiting	1816		
	Daniel H. Whitney	1825		
	Charles Woodward Wilder	1819		
	John Adams Wiley	1825		
	Benjamin Jenkins Williams	1840		
	George Frederick Williams	1817		
	Joel Benedict Williams	1818		
	Nathan Sumner Williams	1829		
	Warren Williams	1811		
	John William Fletcher Wilson	1828		
	Joseph Wilson	1819		
	Charles Wing	1816		
	James Baxter Wood	1809		
	Jonathan Henry Wood	1822		
	George Washington Woodwell	1829		
	James Sullivan Woodworth	1805		
	Charles Whiting Worcester	1808		
	William Henry Prentiss Wright	1828		
	Patrick Ambrose Young	1834		

== See also ==
- 40th United States Congress
- List of Massachusetts General Courts
