= Gershom Bradford Weston =

American politician

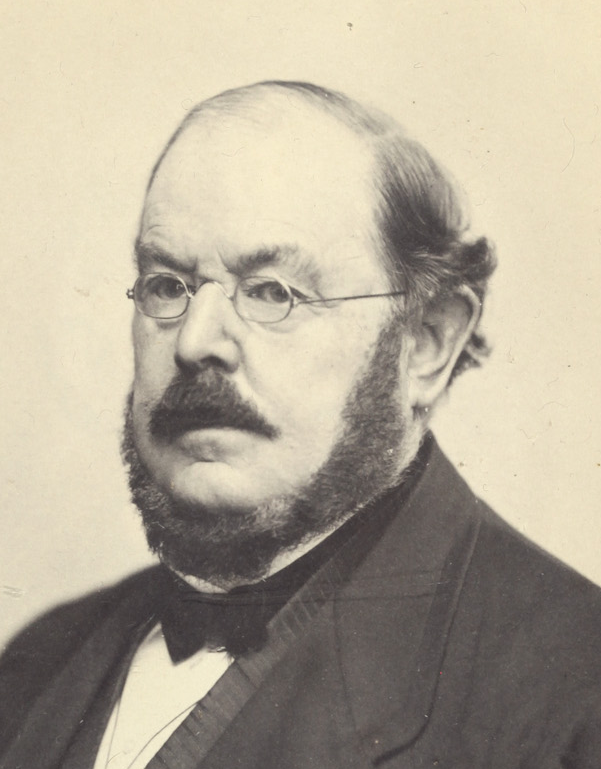

Member of the Massachusetts House of Representatives from Duxbury
- In office 1828–1840

Member of the Judiciary of Massachusetts
- In office 1840–1857

Personal details
- Born: August 27, 1799 Duxbury, Massachusetts, U.S.
- Died: August 14, 1869 (aged 69) Duxbury, Massachusetts, U.S.
- Spouses: Judith Sprague; Deborarh Brownell
- Parents: Ezra Weston II; Jerusha Bradford
- Occupation: Shipbuilder, politician and justice

Gershom Bradford Weston (August 27, 1799 – September 14, 1869) was an American politician. He was the son of shipbuilding tycoon Ezra Weston II (1772-1842) (AKA: King Caesar II) and his wife Jerusha Bradford (1770-1833), who were both direct descendants of six Mayflower pilgrims. Gershom was a large man with reddish hair, weighing about 250 pounds.

At an age 17 he began sailing on his father's ships to Denmark, England and India, before taking on a managerial role in the family business. From 1842 to 1857 he and his brothers ran the family firm until it closed down.

At age 28 he entered politics as a member of the Massachusetts House of Representatives and served there for 12 years before becoming a state justice. In 1848 Gershom joined the newly formed Free-Soil Political Party and strongly advocated its Temperance and Abolitionist platform - "Free Soil, Free Speech, Free Labor and Free Men".

He stood as the Free-Soil candidate for the U.S. Congress and lost by fewer than 150 votes.

Gershom was married twice and had 14 children, several of whom served in the US Civil War.

Late in life, Gershom experienced a series of significant financial reverses. In 1850 his mansion burned to the ground. By 1857 his shipping business had folded. In 1868, friends from the Massachusetts Senate purchased for him the small house he was then renting.

== See also ==
- 1868 Massachusetts legislature
- 1869 Massachusetts legislature
