= 1864 Massachusetts legislature =

85th Massachusetts General Court
←	84th	86th	→

Overview
- Legislative body: General Court
- Election: November 3, 1863

Senate
- Members: 40
- President: Jonathan E. Field

House
- Members: 240
- Speaker: Alexander Hamilton Bullock

Sessions
- 1st: January 6, 1864 – May 14, 1864

The 85th Massachusetts General Court, consisting of the Massachusetts Senate and the Massachusetts House of Representatives, met in 1864 during the governorship of John Albion Andrew. Jonathan E. Field served as president of the Senate and Alexander Hamilton Bullock served as speaker of the House.

== Senators ==
- Israel W. Andrews
- Samuel Babcock
- John I. Baker
- Henry Barstow
- William Bassett
- Winslow Battles
- Martin Brimmer
- Samuel A. Brown
- Henry Carter
- Otis Cary
- Mellen Chamberlain
- Thomas L. Chapman
- Francis Childs
- Oliver B. Clark
- Freeman Cobb
- Charles E. Codman
- John D. Cogswell
- Joseph Crafts
- Nathan Crocker
- Lewis J. Dudley
- Jonathan E. Field
- George Frost
- Horatio N. Gardner
- Martin Griffin
- Solon S. Hastings
- George Heywood
- Edwin F. Jenks
- Jacob H. Loud
- Walter D. Nichols
- William B. Pearsons
- Robert C. Pitman
- Thomas Rice Jr.
- William H. Sanborn
- John E. Sanford
- E. B. Stoddard
- Admiral A. Ward
- Darwin E. Ware
- George Whitney
- George F. Williams
- Thomas Wright

== See also ==
- 38th United States Congress
- List of Massachusetts General Courts
