= 1865 Massachusetts legislature =

86th Massachusetts General Court
←	85th	87th	→

Overview
- Legislative body: General Court
- Election: November 8, 1864

Senate
- Members: 40
- President: Jonathan E. Field

House
- Members: 240
- Speaker: Alexander Hamilton Bullock

Sessions
- 1st: January 4, 1865 – May 17, 1865

The 86th Massachusetts General Court, consisting of the Massachusetts Senate and the Massachusetts House of Representatives, met in 1865 during the governorship of John Albion Andrew. Jonathan E. Field served as president of the Senate and Alexander Hamilton Bullock served as speaker of the House.

== Notable activities ==
- Worcester Polytechnic Institute chartered

== Senators ==
- Charles Adams Jr
- Henry Alexander Jr
- Eben A. Andrews
- Henry Barstow
- Joslah C. Blaisdell
- Paul A. Chadbourne
- Francis Childs
- William W. Clapp Jr
- Freeman Cobb
- Charles R. Codman
- James Easton II
- John S. Eldridge
- Jonathan E. Field
- George Foster
- George Frost
- Martin Griffin
- George Heywood
- Milo Hildreth
- John Hill
- Francis A. Hobart
- Yorick G. Hurd
- Abijah M. Ide
- Emerson Johnson
- Thomas Kneil
- Alden Leland
- Jacob H. Loud
- Joel Merriam
- Francis E. Parker
- Albert C. Parsons
- Robert C. Pitman
- Joseph A. Pond
- William L. Reed
- Moses D. Southwick
- Hiram A. Stevens
- Levi Stockbridge
- E. B. Stoddard
- Darwin Ware
- Solomon C. Wells
- Tappan Wentworth
- Samuel M. Worcester

== See also ==
- 39th United States Congress
- List of Massachusetts General Courts
