= Mellen Chamberlain =

American lawyer, librarian (1821–1900)

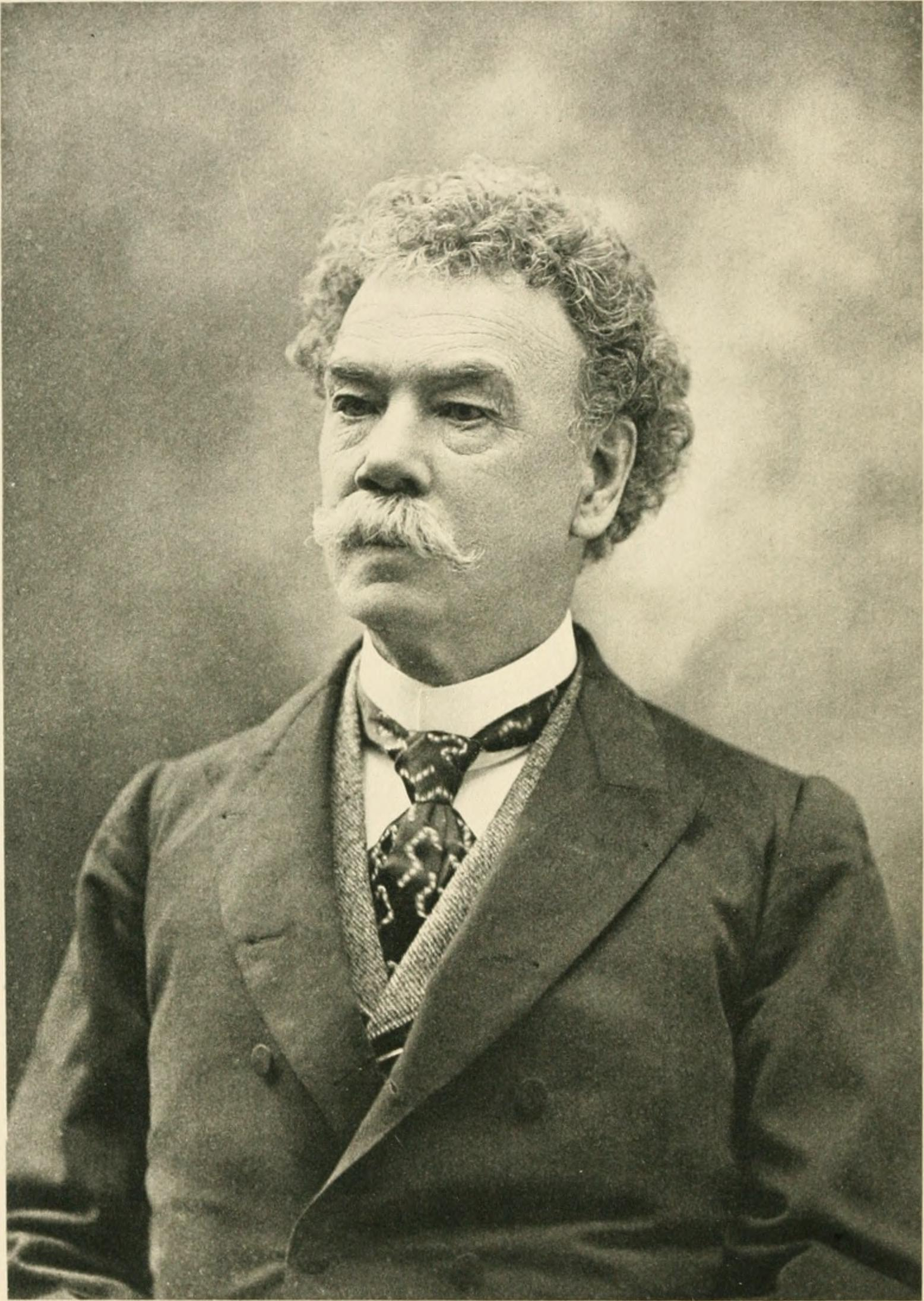
Mellen Chamberlain

Mellen Chamberlain (4 June 1821, Pembroke, New Hampshire - 25 June 1900, Chelsea, Massachusetts) was a United States lawyer, librarian and historian. He was librarian of the Boston Public Library for over a decade.

== Biography ==
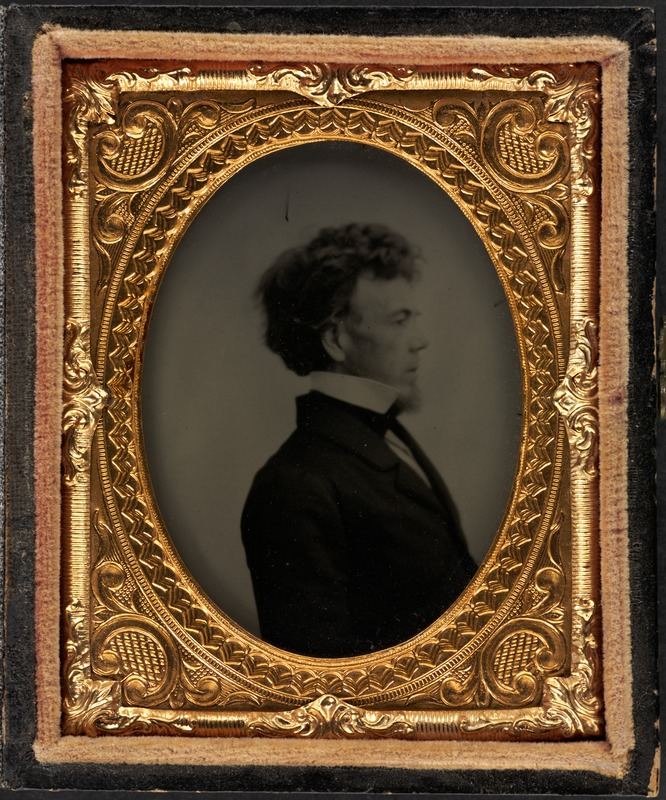
Mellen Chamberlain, ca. 1855. Mellen Chamberlain Collection, Boston Public Library

He graduated from Dartmouth College in 1844 and from the Harvard Law School in 1848. In 1849 he was admitted to the bar, opened a law office in Boston and made his residence in Chelsea, where, during 51 years of citizenship, he served the town in many public capacities. In 1858 and 1859 he was a member of the Massachusetts House of Representatives and the Senate in 1863–64. He was associate justice of the Municipal Court of Boston 1866–70, and chief justice 1870–78.

On 26 August 1878, he was chosen librarian-in-chief of the Boston Public Library, where he served until ill health compelled his retirement in 1890. During his administration, a new library building was begun and the cornerstone laid. Throughout his life he was a close student and investigator of American history.

== Historical works ==
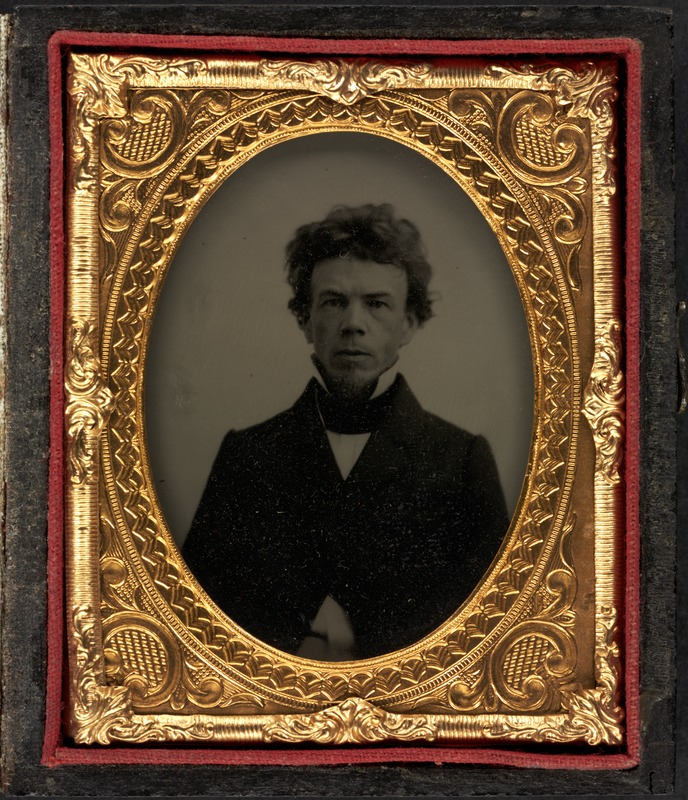
Chamberlain in 1855

Besides chapters in Justin Winsor's Memorial History of Boston (1881), he wrote:

- The History of Winnisimmet, Rumney Marsh, and Pullin Point (1880)
- Narrative and Critical History of America (1888)
- John Adams, the Statesman of the Revolution (1884)
- The Authentication of the Declaration of Independence (1885)
- John Adams, the Statesman, with Other Essays and Addresses (1898)
- The Journals of Captain Henry Dearborn, 1775-83 (1886–87)
- The Constitutional Relations of the American Colonies to the English Government at the Commencement of the American Revolution (1887)

== See also ==
- 84th Massachusetts General Court (1863)
- 85th Massachusetts General Court (1864)
