= 1863 Massachusetts legislature =

84th Massachusetts General Court
←	83rd	85th	→

Overview
- Legislative body: General Court
- Election: November 4, 1862

Senate
- Members: 40
- President: Jonathan E. Field

House
- Members: 240
- Speaker: Alexander Hamilton Bullock

Sessions
- 1st: January 7, 1863 – April 29, 1863 +extra session

The 84th Massachusetts General Court, consisting of the Massachusetts Senate and the Massachusetts House of Representatives, met in 1863 during the governorship of John Albion Andrew. Jonathan E. Field served as president of the Senate and Alexander Hamilton Bullock served as speaker of the House.

== Senators ==
- Joel C. Allen
- Israel W. Andrews, 2nd Essex district
- John L. Baker, 5th Essex district
- Solomon J. Beal
- Joseph Breck
- Francis Brinley
- Samuel A. Brown
- Henry Carter
- Otis Cary
- Mellen Chamberlain
- Hosea Crane
- Joshua Crane
- Robert Crawford
- Nathan Crocker
- Benjamin Dean
- George Dwight
- Jonathan E. Field
- George H. Gilbert
- Peter Harvey
- Erastus O. Haven
- William R. Hill
- Edwin F. Jenks
- Francis M. Johnson
- William F. Johnson
- Asher Joslin
- R. H. Libby
- Francis W. Mason
- James H. Mitchell
- Albert Nichols
- Thomas Rice Jr.
- Harvey M. Richards
- George A. Shaw
- William L. Slade
- William D. Swan
- John C. Tucker
- Horace P. Wakefield
- George Whitney
- Milton B. Whitney
- Hartley Williams
- Thomas Wright

== See also ==
- 38th United States Congress
- List of Massachusetts General Courts
