= Alonzo Madison Giles =

American politician and inventor (1821–1872)

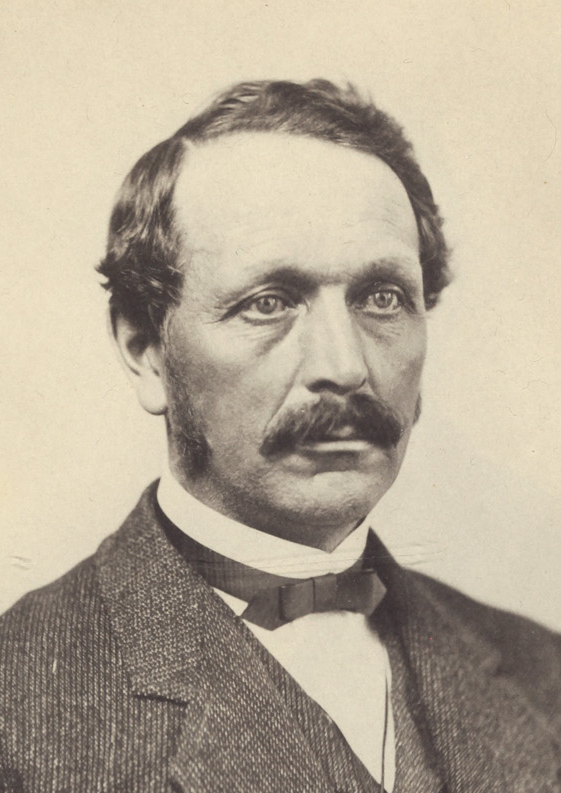
- Alonzo Madison Giles, 1868 Massachusetts Senate

Member of the Massachusetts House of Representatives from the Suffolk County, second district
- In office 1861–1862

Member of the Massachusetts Senate
- In office 1868–1870

Personal details
- Born: February 25, 1821 Brookfield, New Hampshire
- Died: 1872

Alonzo Madison Giles was an American politician in Massachusetts.

Giles was born in Brookfield, New Hampshire, February 25, 1821. He served in the Massachusetts House of Representatives in 1861 and 1862, and in the Massachusetts Senate from 1868 to 1870 for the second district of Suffolk County, Massachusetts.

Giles patented an improved gas-generator that was used in the manufacture of coal gas.

In 1869, his was one of two votes against the 14th Amendment in the Massachusetts Senate.

The genealogy of the Giles family has been documented by John Adams Vinton.

== See also ==
- 1862 Massachusetts legislature
- 1868 Massachusetts legislature
- 1869 Massachusetts legislature
- 1870 Massachusetts legislature
