= William Gelston Bates =

American politician

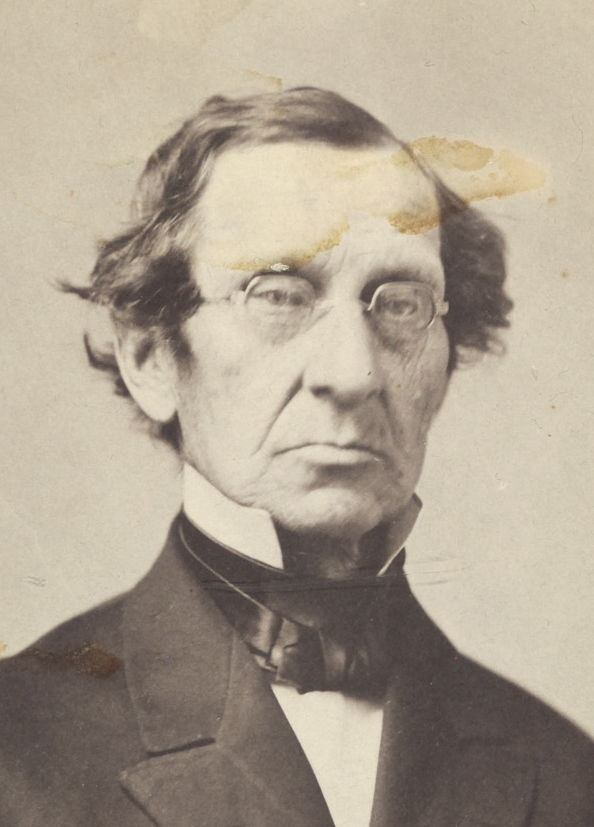
- Born: November 17, 1803; Westfield, Massachusetts, U.S.
- Died: July 5, 1880 (aged 76); Westfield, Massachusetts, U.S.
- Occupations: Politician, lawyer
- Relatives: James C. Greenough (son-in-law)

William Gelston Bates (November 17, 1803 – July 5, 1880) was an American lawyer and politician from Massachusetts.

== Early life and education ==
Bates was born in Westfield, Massachusetts, the eldest child of the Hon. Elijah Bates and Mary Ashley Bates. He graduated from Yale College in 1825. He began the study of law with his father, and continued it at the Northampton Law School in Northampton.

== Career ==
In August 1828, Bates was admitted to the bar of his native county, and began practice in Westfield, succeeding to the business of his father. From 1839 to 1847 he was a member of the Massachusetts State Board of Education. In 1840 he was elected to the Massachusetts State Senate, and in 1844 and 1845 was a member of the Massachusetts Governor's Council. In 1868 he was also a member of the Massachusetts House of Representatives. In 1853 he was appointed District Attorney for the Western District of Massachusetts.

Besides his professional labors his readiness and felicity as a writer and speaker led him to be invited to the delivery of many public addresses, of several which were printed. The most important were the Historical Address at the 200th Anniversary of the Incorporation of Westfield in 1869, and the Address at the Dedication of the new Court House in Springfield in 1874. In 1865 he wrote the hymn sung at a Westfield memorial service for Abraham Lincoln.

== Personal life and legacy ==
Bates was married, in October 1830, to Jane Pelletreau Ashley. Of their eight children, five died infancy; three daughters survived him, when he died in Westfield in 1880, at the age of 76. One of his daughters, Jane Ashley Bates, became a writer and married James C. Greenough, a prominent educator. Bates' grandson William Bates Greenough was the Attorney General of Rhode Island.

== See also ==
- 1868 Massachusetts legislature
