= George O. Brastow =

Politician in Massachusetts, US (1811–1878)

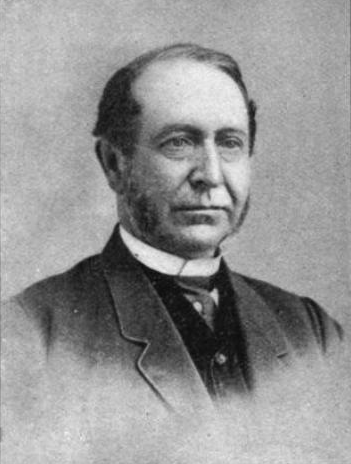

Member of the Massachusetts Governor's Council Sixth Councilor District
- In office 1874–1876

1st Mayor of Somerville, Massachusetts
- In office January 1, 1872 – January 5, 1874
- Preceded by: Board of Selectmen
- Succeeded by: William H. Furber

47th President of the Massachusetts Senate
- In office 1869–1869
- Preceded by: Robert C. Pitman
- Succeeded by: Horace H. Coolidge

45th President of the Massachusetts Senate
- In office 1868–1868
- Preceded by: Joseph A. Pond
- Succeeded by: Robert C. Pitman

Member of the Massachusetts Senate Second Middlesex District
- In office 1867–1869
- Succeeded by: James Pierce

Member of the Massachusetts Senate First Middlesex District
- In office 1866–1867
- Preceded by: Francis Childs

Member of the Massachusetts Senate County of Middlesex
- In office 1854–1854

Member of the Somerville, Massachusetts Board of Selectmen
- In office 1867–1867

Member of the Somerville, Massachusetts Board of Selectmen
- In office 1845–1845

Member of the Massachusetts House of Representatives Third Middlesex District
- In office 1862–1862
- Preceded by: Columbus Taylor
- Succeeded by: Chester Guild

Member of the Massachusetts House of Representatives Town of Somerville District
- In office 1849–1851
- Preceded by: Edward L. Stevens
- Succeeded by: Edward C. Purdy

Member of the Somerville, Massachusetts School Committee

Personal details
- Born: September 8, 1811 Wrentham, Massachusetts
- Died: November 20, 1878 (aged 67) Canandaigua, New York

Military service
- Allegiance: United States of America; Union
- Rank: Major
- Unit: Army of Northeastern Virginia
- Commands: Company I – Somerville Light Infantry – Company B 5th Regiment
- Battles/wars: First Battle of Bull Run

George Oliver Brastow (September 8, 1811 – November 20, 1878) was a Massachusetts businessman and politician who served as a member and President of the Massachusetts Senate, as a member of the Governor's Council, and as the first Mayor of Somerville, Massachusetts.

== Military service ==
Before the American Civil War Brastow was the Captain of Company I of the Somerville Light Infantry of the Massachusetts Volunteer Militia. Brastow commanded the company, for the three months at the beginning of the Civil War, that Company I was federalized and reconstituted as Company B of the 5th Regiment. Brastow and his regiment fought at the First Battle of Bull Run.

In 1862 Brastow was commissioned a paymaster with the rank of Major.

== See also ==
- 88th Massachusetts General Court (1867)
- 89th Massachusetts General Court (1868)
- 90th Massachusetts General Court (1869)

== Notes ==
Political offices
| Preceded by Board of Selectmen | 1st Mayor of Somerville, Massachusetts; January 1, 1872 – January 5, 1874 | Succeeded by William H. Furber |
| Preceded by Joseph A. Pond | 45th President of the Massachusetts Senate; 1868-1868 | Succeeded by Robert C. Pitman |
| Preceded by Robert C. Pitman | 47th President of the Massachusetts Senate; 1869-1869 | Succeeded by Horace H. Coolidge |
