= Joseph Tucker (Massachusetts politician) =

American politician

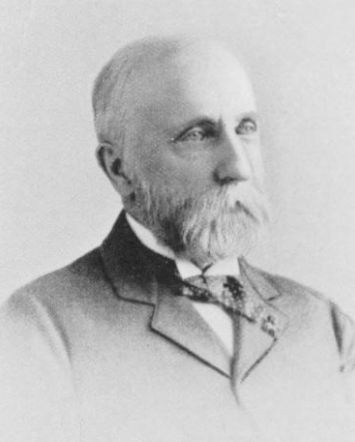

Justice of the Central Berkshire District Court
- In office 1873–1907
- Appointed by: William B. Washburn
- Preceded by: Henry Shaw Briggs
- Succeeded by: Charles E. Burke

28th Lieutenant Governor of Massachusetts
- In office 1869–1873
- Governor: William Claflin; William B. Washburn
- Preceded by: William Claflin
- Succeeded by: Thomas Talbot

Member of the Massachusetts Senate
- In office 1866–1867
- Preceded by: Jonathan E. Field
- Succeeded by: Marshal Wilcox
- Constituency: South Berkshire District (1866); Berkshire and Hampshire District (1867)

Member of the Massachusetts House of Representatives from the 7th Berkshire district
- In office 1865
- Preceded by: Rensselaer Couch
- Succeeded by: Mark Van Deusen

Personal details
- Born: August 21, 1832 Lenox, Massachusetts
- Died: November 28, 1907 (aged 75) Pittsfield, Massachusetts
- Party: Republican
- Parent(s): George J. Tucker (father); Eunice Cook (mother)
- Education: Williams College; Harvard Law School

Military service
- Allegiance: United States of America
- Branch/service: United States Army
- Years of service: 1862–1863
- Rank: First Lieutenant
- Unit: 49th Regiment Massachusetts Volunteer Infantry
- Battles/wars: American Civil War

Joseph Tucker (August 21, 1832 – November 28, 1907) was an American politician who served as the 28th lieutenant governor of Massachusetts from 1869 to 1873.

== Early life and career ==
Joseph Tucker was born in Lenox, Massachusetts on August 21, 1832, to George J. and Eunice Cook Tucker. Both his father and grandfather were treasurers of Berkshire County. Joseph's youngest brother George was also county treasurer.

Tucker graduated from Lenox Academy and attended Williams College, graduating in 1851. He then studied at Harvard Law School and was admitted to the Berkshire bar in 1854. After graduating, Tucker practiced law in St. Louis until 1860. Following the outbreak of the Civil War, Tucker worked in Great Barrington, Massachusetts.

== Military career ==
In September 1862, Tucker enlisted in the 49th Regiment Massachusetts Volunteer Infantry. During the Red River Campaign, Tucker served as acting assistant adjutant general.

At the Battle of Plains Store, Tucker was shot in the right knee, requiring an amputation of the right leg. After the amputation, Tucker was sent home.

== Political career ==
Tucker's political career started in November 1863 when Governor John Albion Andrew appointed him superintendent of recruiting in Berkshire County.

In 1865, Tucker won his first elected position to the Massachusetts House of Representatives. He represented the 7th Berkshire district, which encompassed his hometown of Great Barrington, as well as Alford and Monterey. While a representative, Tucker served on the Joint Committee on Military Affairs.

Tucker was elected to the Massachusetts Senate in 1866. He originally represented the South Berkshire District, encompassing Alford, Becket, Egremont, Great Barrington, Lee, Lenox, Monterey, Mount Washington, New Marlborough, Otis, Richmond, Sandisfield, Sheffield, Stockbridge, Tyringham, Washington, and West Stockbridge. In this position, Tucker served on the Senate Committee on the Judiciary and chaired the Joint Committee on Military Affairs. He also chaired the Joint Special Committee on Soldiers and Sailors, and Families of the Slain, and served on the Joint Special Committee on the Petition of Pierce, Bacon and Others, for a License Law.

In 1867, Senator Tucker was redistricted to the Berkshire and Hampshire District, encompassing Alford, Becket, Egremont, Great Barrington, Lee, Lenox, Monterey, Mount Washington, New Marlborough, Otis, Sandisfield, Sheffield, Stockbridge, Tyringham, West Stockbridge, Chesterfield, Cummington, Goshen, Huntington, Middlefield, Plainfield, and Worthington. Tucker continued to serve on the Senate Committee on the Judiciary and chair the Joint Committee on Military Affairs and Joint Special Committee on Expenditures for State Aid to Soldiers, etc. Tucker also became the chairman of the Joint Special Committee on Purchase of Western Railroad.

He died at his home in Pittsfield on November 28, 1907.

Political offices
| Preceded by William Claflin | Lieutenant Governor of Massachusetts; 1869 – 1873 | Succeeded by Thomas Talbot |

== See also ==
- 88th Massachusetts General Court (1867)
