= William Claflin =

American politician (1818–1905)

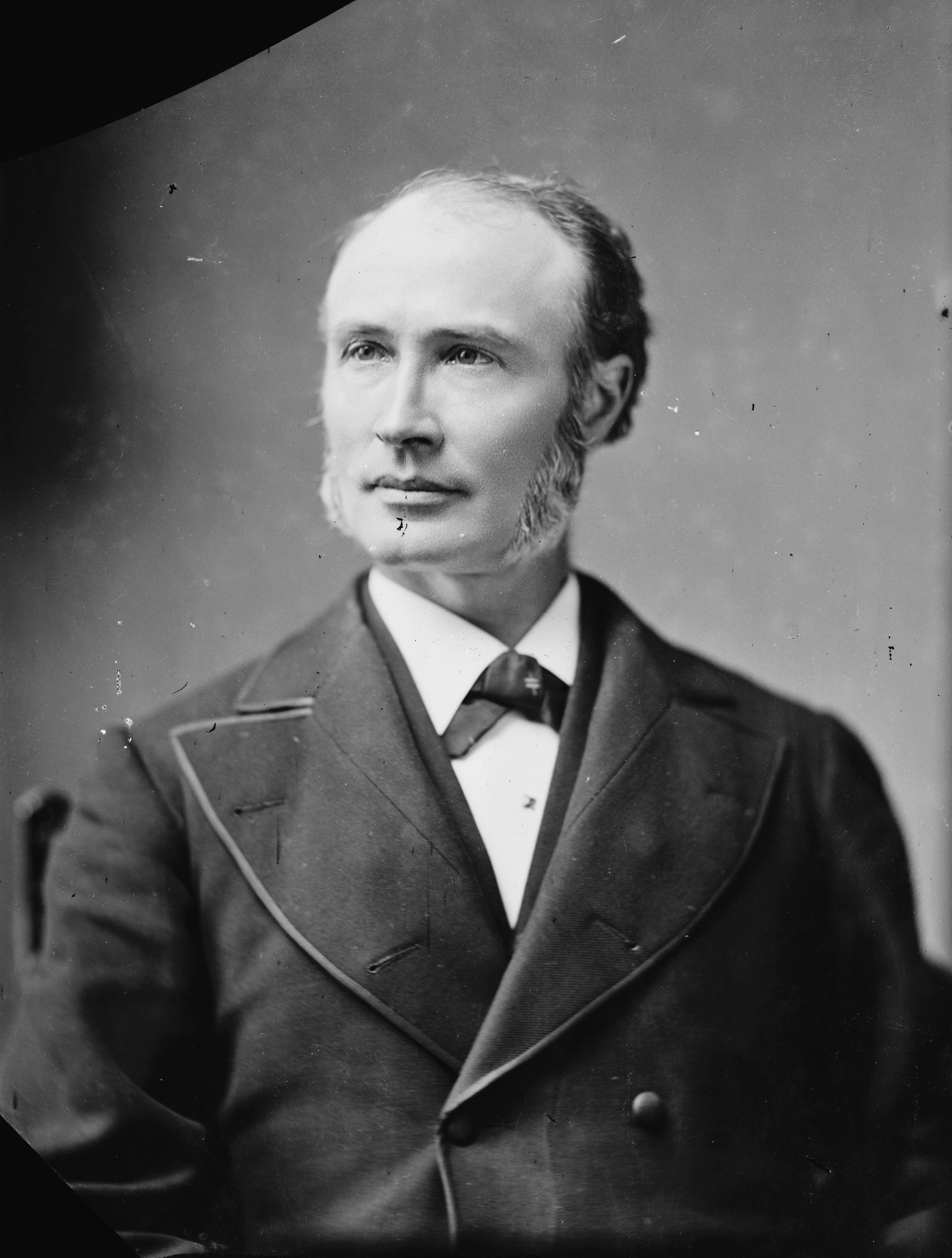
- Portrait by Brady-Handy studio, 1870s

27th Governor of Massachusetts
- In office January 7, 1869 – January 4, 1872
- Lieutenant: Joseph Tucker
- Preceded by: Alexander H. Bullock
- Succeeded by: William B. Washburn

Member of the U.S. House of Representatives from Massachusetts's 8th district
- In office March 4, 1877 – March 3, 1881
- Preceded by: William W. Warren
- Succeeded by: John W. Candler

27th Lieutenant Governor of Massachusetts
- In office January 4, 1866 – January 7, 1869
- Governor: Alexander H. Bullock
- Preceded by: Joel Hayden
- Succeeded by: Joseph Tucker

4th Chairman of the Republican National Committee
- In office 1868–1872
- Preceded by: Marcus Lawrence Ward
- Succeeded by: Edwin D. Morgan

Member of the Massachusetts House of Representatives
- In office 1849–1853

Personal details
- Born: March 6, 1818 Milford, Massachusetts
- Died: January 5, 1905 (aged 86) Newton, Massachusetts
- Party: Free Soil; Republican

William Claflin (March 6, 1818 – January 5, 1905) was an American politician, industrialist, and philanthropist from Massachusetts. He served as the 27th governor of Massachusetts from 1869 to 1872 and as a member of the United States Congress from 1877 to 1881. He also served as chairman of the Republican National Committee from 1868 to 1872, serving as a moderating force between the Radical and moderate wings of the Republican Party. His name is given to Claflin University in South Carolina, a historically black college founded with funding from him and his father.

Claflin was educated at Brown University and worked in his father's shoe manufacturing business before becoming a partner in it. An opponent of slavery, he helped establish the state's Free Soil Party before dominating the state's Republican Party establishment in the 1860s. He supported a number of social reforms, including increased property and voting rights for women, and he was the state's first governor to actively support full women's suffrage. He supported many charitable causes and promoted the development of the village Newtonville, where his country estate was located.

== Early years and business ==
William Claflin was born on March 6, 1818, in Milford, Massachusetts, to Lee and Sarah Watkins (Adams) Claflin. Lee Claflin was a self-made proprietor of a tannery and shoe factory in Milford, and a politically active abolitionist. William was educated first in the local schools and then at Milford Academy, before he enrolled in Brown University in 1833. His mother died in 1834 and his health was poor, so he left school and entered his father's business. After three years, with his health not improving, he traveled to St. Louis, Missouri, where from 1838 to 1844 he worked in the wholesale leather goods business. He then returned to Massachusetts after his health improved, where he rejoined the family business and settled in Hopkinton.

Claflin's father had begun his shoe manufacturing in partnership with Nathan Parker Coburn, and William joined their partnership, forming a business that lasted into the 1890s. They expanded the business Lee Claflin founded, eventually building one of New England's largest boot factories in South Framingham in 1882. Claflin and Coburn would remain in active partnership until 1878, when Claflin withdrew from active participation, and their partnership was finally dissolved at the end of 1891 with Coburn's retirement. The company assets, including plants in Framingham, Hopkinton, and Milford, were then taken over by younger partners.

== Politics ==
Claflin followed his father in both politics and his methodist religion, opposing the expansion of slavery and promoting other social reforms. He was a member of the "Bird Club", a political organization formed by businessman Francis W. Bird, whose members dominated much of the politics of the state between the 1850s and 1870s. Its members were predominantly wealthy businessmen who favored abolition and engaged in philanthropic social reforms. In 1848 Claflin helped found the Free Soil Party in Massachusetts, under whose banner he won election to the Massachusetts House of Representatives that year. He served from 1849 to 1853, when the Know Nothings (who he refused to join) swept away the old parties. He became active in 1854 and 1855 in the founding of the state Republican Party, and served as its state chairman for a number of years. He was elected to the state senate in 1859 as a Republican, and became Senate President in 1861. He developed a close political association and friendship with fellow Free Soiler and Republican Henry Wilson, and was one of the dominant forces in the state Republican Party establishment in the 1860s.

In 1865 Claflin was elected Lieutenant Governor under Governor Alexander Hamilton Bullock, winning reelection on the same ticket two times. He was elected governor in 1868, and served three terms in that office, defeating John Quincy Adams II each time.

Claflin was the first governor to actively support and promote full women's suffrage. He successfully extended to women greater rights under the law, especially in the areas of divorce and contract law. He advocated prison reform, creating a Board of Prison Commissioners, and established the state's first board of public health. In a bid to retain labor support threatened by the nascent Labor Reform Party, the Republican legislature created a bureau of labor statistics, the first such body in the nation.

Claflin opposed state funding support for the Boston, Hartford and Erie Railroad, vetoing a loan for that railroad, while the state was otherwise lending financial support to the construction of the Hoosac Tunnel. The veto was a politically costly move, which, combined with the loss of labor votes to the Labor Reform Party, resulted in the lowest margin of victory for a Republican to date in governor's races in the 1870 election. As a result of this poor showing, Claflin was perceived as a weak candidate for reelection, and refused to stand in 1871; he also did not attend the state nominating convention. The Republican nomination went to the eventual election victor, William B. Washburn. Washburn's election signalled an end to the influence of the Bird Club as a unifying force in state Republican politics.

During the 1860s, Claflin remained active at high levels of party politics, gaining appointment to the national executive committee of the Republican Party in 1864. In that role, he was a critical mediating force between radical and conservative factions of the party, promoting the moderate Schuyler Colfax for vice president under Ulysses S. Grant in the 1868 election. In 1868 he was elected chairman of the national party. He reluctantly promoted Grant for president in the 1872 election, unhappy that Grant had given patronage power in Massachusetts to the controversial ex-general Benjamin Butler. He stepped back from the chairmanship when Henry Wilson received the vice presidential nomination.

Along with his father, Claflin donated funds to purchase land for Claflin University, the historically black Methodist university in South Carolina. The university was founded in 1869, and was named in his father's honor. Claflin was also a significant supporter of higher education for women, signing charters for Wellesley College and Mount Holyoke College, both women's colleges, while governor. He sat on the boards of trustees at some point for many of these schools, as well as Wesleyan University (which his father also helped found) and Harvard University, both of which gave him honorary degrees.

== Later years ==
Claflin returned to business and supported philanthropic activities (many related to the Methodist Church, in which he was active) after leaving Congress. He died on January 5, 1905, at his home in Newton, and was buried in Newton Cemetery. He married twice. His first marriage was in 1839 to Nancy (Warren) Harding of Milford, with whom he had a daughter before she died in 1842. The second, in 1845, was to Mary Bucklin of Hopkinton, with whom he had five children, only two of whom survived him. His son Adams Claflin played a major role in the provision of streetcar service to Newton.

Claflin was a major force in the development of the village of Newtonville in Newton, Massachusetts. In 1854 he purchased a farm that had once been owned by two governors: Simon Bradstreet (a 17th-century governor of the Massachusetts Bay Colony), and William Hull, governor of the Michigan Territory. Claflin moved Hull's mansion to one side of the property and built a new one on the old foundation. He subdivided portions of the estate for development, and was responsible for the construction of the Claflin Block in Newtonville. After his death the local civic improvement association purchased the rest of Claflin's estate and gave it to the town. The site is now the location of the Newton North High School athletic fields. Newtonville's Claflin School is named in his honor.

== See also ==
- Claflin family

== Notes ==
Political offices
Preceded by Joel Hayden	Lieutenant Governor of Massachusetts; 1866–1869	Succeeded by Joseph Tucker
Preceded by Alexander H. Bullock	Governor of Massachusetts; January 7, 1869 – January 4, 1872	Succeeded by William B. Washburn
Party political offices
Preceded by Alexander Bullock	Republican nominee for Governor of Massachusetts; 1868, 1869, 1870	Succeeded by William B. Washburn
Preceded by Marcus Lawrence Ward	Chairman of the Republican National Committee; 1868–1872	Succeeded by Edwin D. Morgan
U.S. House of Representatives
Preceded by William W. Warren	Member of the U.S. House of Representatives from Massachusetts's 8th congressional district March 4, 1877 – March 4, 1881	Succeeded by John W. Candler
