= Horace H. Coolidge =

American politician (1832–1912)

Horace Hopkins Coolidge
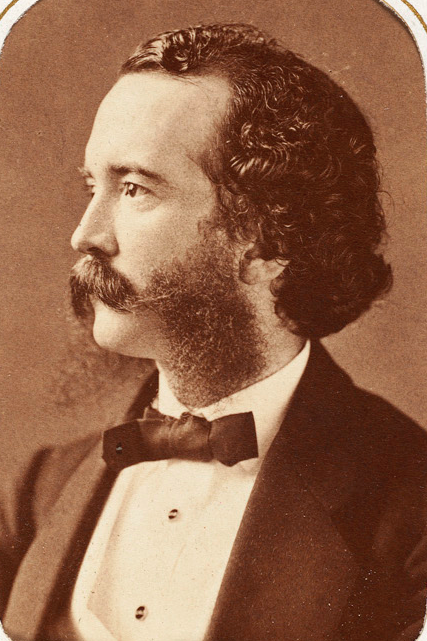

President of the Massachusetts Senate
- In office 1870–1872
- Preceded by: George O. Brastow
- Succeeded by: George B. Loring

Member of the Massachusetts Senate
- In office 1869–1872

Member of the Massachusetts House of Representatives
- In office 1865–1867

Personal details
- Born: February 11, 1832 Boston, Massachusetts
- Died: February 3, 1912 (aged 79) Boston, Massachusetts
- Resting place: Mount Auburn Cemetery
- Spouse: Eunice Maria Weeks
- Children: William Williamson Coolidge, Louisa Maria Coolidge, Alice Coolidge, and Charles Cummings Coolidge.
- Education: Harvard College, 1852; Harvard Law School, 1856

Horace Hopkins Coolidge (February 11, 1832 – February 3, 1912) was a Massachusetts lawyer and politician who served in the Massachusetts House of Representatives, and as a member and President of the Massachusetts Senate.

== Early life ==
Coolidge was born on February 11, 1832, in Boston, Massachusetts, to Amos and Louisa (Hopkins) Coolidge.

== Education ==
Coolidge attended Boston Latin School, and Harvard College, from which he graduated Phi Beta Kappa in 1852. He received his A.M. from Harvard in 1855, and his LL.B. in 1856.

== Massachusetts legislature ==
Coolidge started his career as an "eminent lawyer" in Boston. He served as a Master in Chancery and Commissioner of Insolvency. He was elected to the Massachusetts House of Representatives from 1865 to 1867, and to the Massachusetts Senate from 1869 to 1872. He served as President of the Massachusetts Senate during his last three years in the Senate.

== Family life ==
Horace Hopkins Coolidge was a direct descendant of John and Mary Coolidge of Watertown, Massachusetts, formerly of Cottenham, England. They sailed to America in 1630 with the famous Arbella fleet led by Governor John Winthrop.

On October 27, 1857 Horace Coolidge married Eunice Maria Weeks. They had four children: William Williamson Coolidge, Louisa Maria Coolidge, Alice Coolidge, and Charles Cummings Coolidge. W.W. Coolidge was a lawyer, city councillor, and city solicitor in Salem, Massachusetts. He married Helen Whittington Mills. Louisa Maria Coolidge married Alfred Dennis Hurd of Cambridge, Massachusetts, and the couple resided in Salem, Massachusetts. Hurd's father, Melancthon Montgomery Hurd, was co-founder of Hurd & Houghton, a publishing company. Today, it is Houghton Mifflin Harcourt. Alfred D. Hurd was also involved in the family publishing business. The couple had two children: Marjorie and John Coolidge Hurd. Alice Coolidge died young and unmarried. Charles Cummings Coolidge spent his life at sea and as a sheep rancher in Australia and Montana. He died unmarried.

== Death ==
Coolidge died on February 3, 1912, at his home at 7 Court Square, in Boston, Massachusetts. He is buried at Mount Auburn Cemetery in Cambridge, Massachusetts, with his wife and many of his descendants.

== See also ==
- 1869 Massachusetts legislature
- 1870 Massachusetts legislature
- 1871 Massachusetts legislature
- 1872 Massachusetts legislature

Political offices
Preceded by George O. Brastow	President of the Massachusetts Senate; 1870 1872	Succeeded by George B. Loring
