= Hathaway (surname) =

Hathaway is an English surname. Notable people and characters with the name include:

- Amy Hathaway (born 1974), American actress
- Anne Hathaway (born 1982), American actress
- Anne Hathaway (wife of Shakespeare) (1556–1623)
- Anthony Hathaway, American bank robber
- Arthur Stafford Hathaway (1855–1934), American mathematician
- Bradley Hathaway (born 1982), American poet and musician
- David Hathaway (born 1932), English evangelist, founder and president of Eurovision Mission to Europe
- Diane Hathaway (born 1954), American judge
- Donny Hathaway (1945–1979), soul musician
- Eulaulah Donyll Hathaway (born 1968), best known as Lalah Hathaway, R&B/jazz singer
- Gardner Hathaway (1925–2013), former CIA staff
- Garnet Hathaway (born 1991), American ice hockey player
- George Luther Hathaway (1813–1872), Canadian politician
- Henry Hathaway (1898–1985), American film director and producer
- Horace K. Hathaway (1878–1944), American consulting engineer
- Horatio Hathaway (1831–1898), American businessman
- Jack Hathaway (born 1982), commander in the United States Navy and NASA astronaut
- James Hathaway, multiple people
- Jane Hathaway, multiple people
- Jason Hathaway (born 1976), Canadian professional stock car racing driver
- Jean Hathaway (1876–1938), Hungarian-born American actress
- John Hathaway (disambiguation), multiple people
- Josh Hathaway (born 2003), Welsh rugby union player
- Joy Hathaway, (1913-1954), Canadian-born American actress
- Kenya Hathaway (born 1971), American contemporary R&B and jazz singer
- Maggie Hathaway (1911–2001), American activist, blues singer, actress, sportswriter and golfer
- Marcia Hathaway, Australian actress
- Melissa Hathaway (born 1968), cybersecurity expert who served in the Obama administration
- Millicent Hathaway (1898–1974), American nutritionist and physiological chemist
- Noah Hathaway (born 1971), American film actor
- Oona A. Hathaway, American legal scholar
- Ray Hathaway (1916–2015), American baseball player
- Rhody Hathaway (1868–1944), American actor
- Robert Hathaway (1887–1954), Seigneur of Sark
- Rufus Hathaway (1770–1822), American medical doctor and folk art painter
- Sibyl Hathaway (1884–1974), Dame of Sark
- Stanley K. Hathaway (1924–2005), American politician
- Starke R. Hathaway (1903–1984), American psychologist
- Steve Hathaway (born 1990), American baseball pitcher
- Stokely Hathaway (born 1990), American professional wrestling manager and professional wrestler
- William Hathaway (1924–2013), American politician
- William K. Hathaway, American poet
- Winifred Hathaway, (1870–1954), Welsh-born American educator

== Fictional characters ==
- Michelle, Taylor, and Frankie Hathaway from The Haunted Hathaways
- James Hathaway, a detective sergeant and principal character in the British television series Lewis
- Jane Hathaway, recurring character in The Beverly Hillbillies
- Carol Hathaway, a character from ER
- Rose Hathaway and Janine Hathaway, characters from Vampire Academy
- Hathaway Noa, a character from the Gundam franchise
- Simon Hathaway, a character from the Assassin's Creed franchise.
- Phoenix Hathaway, a character from Hollyoaks

== See also ==
- Hadaway
