= John Hathaway =

John Hathaway may refer to:

- John Hathaway (Australian politician) (born 1964), Australian politician in the Liberal National party
- John Hathaway (English wrestler) (born 1987), English wrestler and MMA fighter
- John Brown Hathaway (1809–1895), American politician in Massachusetts
- John M. Hathaway (1926–1989), American politician in Florida
- John Hathaway Reed (1921–2012), American diplomat and politician in Maine

== See also ==
- Hathaway (surname)
- Jane Hathaway (disambiguation)
