= Fort Nichols (Massachusetts) =

Coordinates: 42°50′11″N 70°54′38″W

Fort Nichols was a fort that existed in 1775 in Amesbury, Massachusetts during the American Revolutionary War. It was also known as Fort Merrimac during its existence. Two possible locations for the fort exist. One is a location named Salisbury Point on modern topographic maps, where Interstate 95 crosses the Merrimack River; this is the location of the coordinates given. Another possibility is the mouth of the Merrimack at Salisbury Beach in Salisbury. One source (Heitman) states that the American Civil War Fort at Salisbury Point was built at the same location as Fort Nichols, which is given as "at Salisbury Point, opposite Newburyport". The Civil War fort was sometimes referred to as Fort Nichols by local civilians.

== See also ==
- List of military installations in Massachusetts
