= Fort Miller =

Fort Miller may refer to:

- Fort Miller, California, a former Army post and town in California.
- Fort Miller (Massachusetts), a former fort in Marblehead.
