= Kurgo =

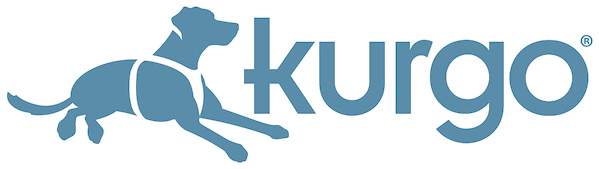
- Company type: Brand
- Industry: Retail, Ecommerce
- Founded: 2003; Salisbury, Massachusetts
- Founder: Kitter Spater; Gordie Spater
- Headquarters: Knoxville, Tennessee
- Area served: Worldwide
- Products: Outdoor Dog Gear
- Owner: Radio Systems Corporation
- Website: www.kurgo.com

Kurgo is outdoor dog gear brand owned by Radio Systems Corporation.

Kurgo gear is carried by PetSmart, Petco, and numerous other physical and online retailers and as such, is considered to be a leading manufacturer of pet travel and safety products in the United States and Canada. Kurgo products are also available in the UK, Europe, Australia, and New Zealand.

In addition to its Knoxville, Tennessee headquarters, the brand maintains a satellite office in Amesbury, Massachusetts.

== History ==
Kurgo founders and brothers, Kitter and Gordie Spater, grew up exploring the Vermont woods along with their family dogs. Their entrepreneurial spirit and love of dogs motivated them to create Kurgo—although the brand’s inspiration is credited to Kitter’s dog, Zelda.

Zelda had a dangerous habit of jumping into the front seat during car rides. After one too many close calls, Kitter built the first prototype of what would later become the Backseat Barrier in his garage.

Since then, Kurgo has expanded its product line into carrier backpacks, active harnesses, cold weather jackets, seat covers, and other outdoor accessories.

In 2008, Kurgo partnered with Toyota to advocate for safe pet travel.

in 2011, Kurgo partnered with AAA to coordinate a pet travel safety survey.

Kurgo was acquired by Radio Systems Corporation in October 2018.

== Awards ==
=== Product Awards ===
In 2020, the Tru-Fit Smart Harness Quick Release was voted the Best Dog Harness by Wirecutter.

In 2021, the G-Train Backpack received The Dodo's Paw of Approval.

== Sources ==
- "Nearly One in Five Respondents to AAA/Kurgo Survey Admit to Taking Hands off the Wheel to Keep Dogs from Climbing in Front Seat | AAA NewsRoom." AAA NewsRoom. 19 July 2011. http://newsroom.aaa.com/2011/07/2011-kurgo-pet-surve/.
