= James Augustus Fox =

American politician (1827–1901)

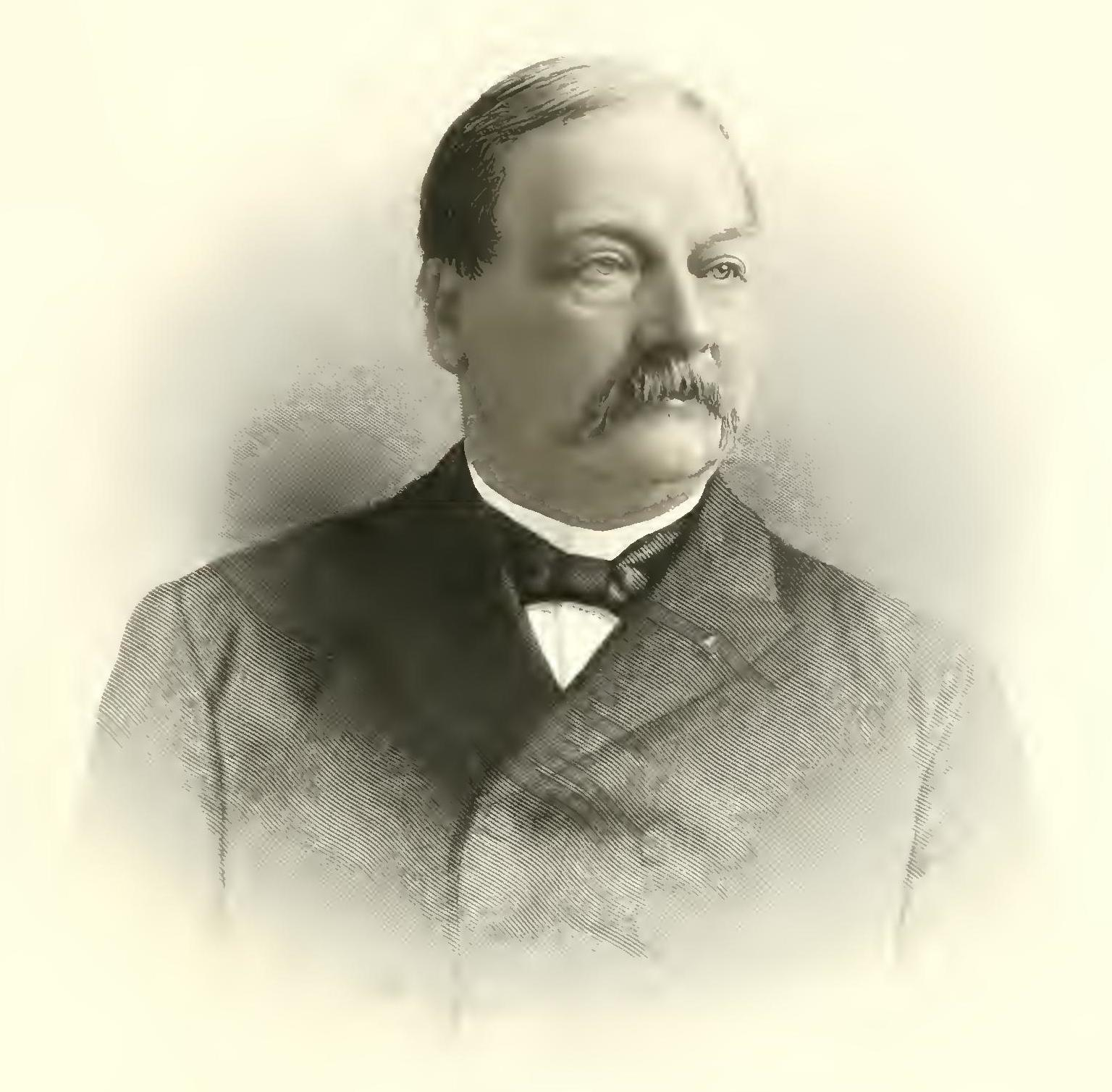
- Undated portrait of Fox, published 1913
- Born: August 11, 1827; Boston, Massachusetts, US
- Died: September 1901 (aged 74)
- Burial place: Mount Auburn Cemetery; Cambridge, Massachusetts, US
- Education: Harvard Law School
- Occupations: Lawyer; politician
- Spouse: Julia Elizabeth (m. 1848; died 1872)
- Children: 3 daughters
- Military career
- Allegiance: United States
- Years: 1861–1865
- Rank: Captain
- Unit: Massachusetts Militia
- Commands: Massachusetts Artillery
- Conflicts: American Civil War

Signature
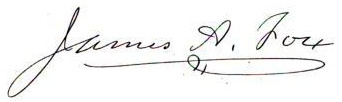

James Augustus Fox (August 11, 1827 – September 1901) was an American politician, lawyer, and soldier. He served in the Massachusetts Senate and the Massachusetts House of Representatives. He was also a four-term mayor of Cambridge, Massachusetts.

== Early life ==
Fox was born in Boston, Massachusetts on August 11, 1827. He was descended from English and Scottish people. His father, George Howe Fox, came from the line of the author John Foxe. His mother, Emily Fox (née Wyatt), was related to the statesman John Murray Forbes. Fox attended Boston Public Schools and Harvard Law School before clerking for John C. Park.

== Career ==
Fox was admitted to the Suffolk County, Massachusetts bar in 1854, and began his practice of law.

During the American Civil War, Fox was made a captain in the 13th Regiment of the Unattached Companies Massachusetts Volunteer Militia in 1861. From 1861 to 1862, Fox served in Virginia with good marks, and from 1864 to 1865, he commanded the Ancient and Honorable Artillery Company of Massachusetts. As an early member of the Loyal Legion after the war, Fox occasionally made speeches on the conflict, including his "The Two Civilizations," which was later published.

Fox was a member of the Boston School Committee for three years. From 1867 to 1868, he served in the Massachusetts House of Representatives and the Massachusetts Senate from 1870 to 1871. After moving there in 1874, Fox served four terms as the mayor of Cambridge, Massachusetts.

== Personal life ==
Fox married Julia Elizabeth of Providence, Rhode Island in 1848. The couple had three daughters—Henrietta, Julia, and Lillian—before Julia Elizabeth died in 1872.

In 1872, Fox moved to Cambridge, Massachusetts. He was an active member of the Independent Order of Odd Fellows, the Improved Order of Red Men, and the Knights of Pythias as Grand Chancellor of Massachusetts, Supreme Representative to the national branch, and Judge-Advocate-General of the uniform rank.

He died in September 1901, and was buried in Mount Auburn Cemetery.

== See also ==
- 1868 Massachusetts legislature
- 1870 Massachusetts legislature
- 1871 Massachusetts legislature
