= Fort Sewall =

- U.S. National Register of Historic Places
- U.S. Historic district – Contributing property
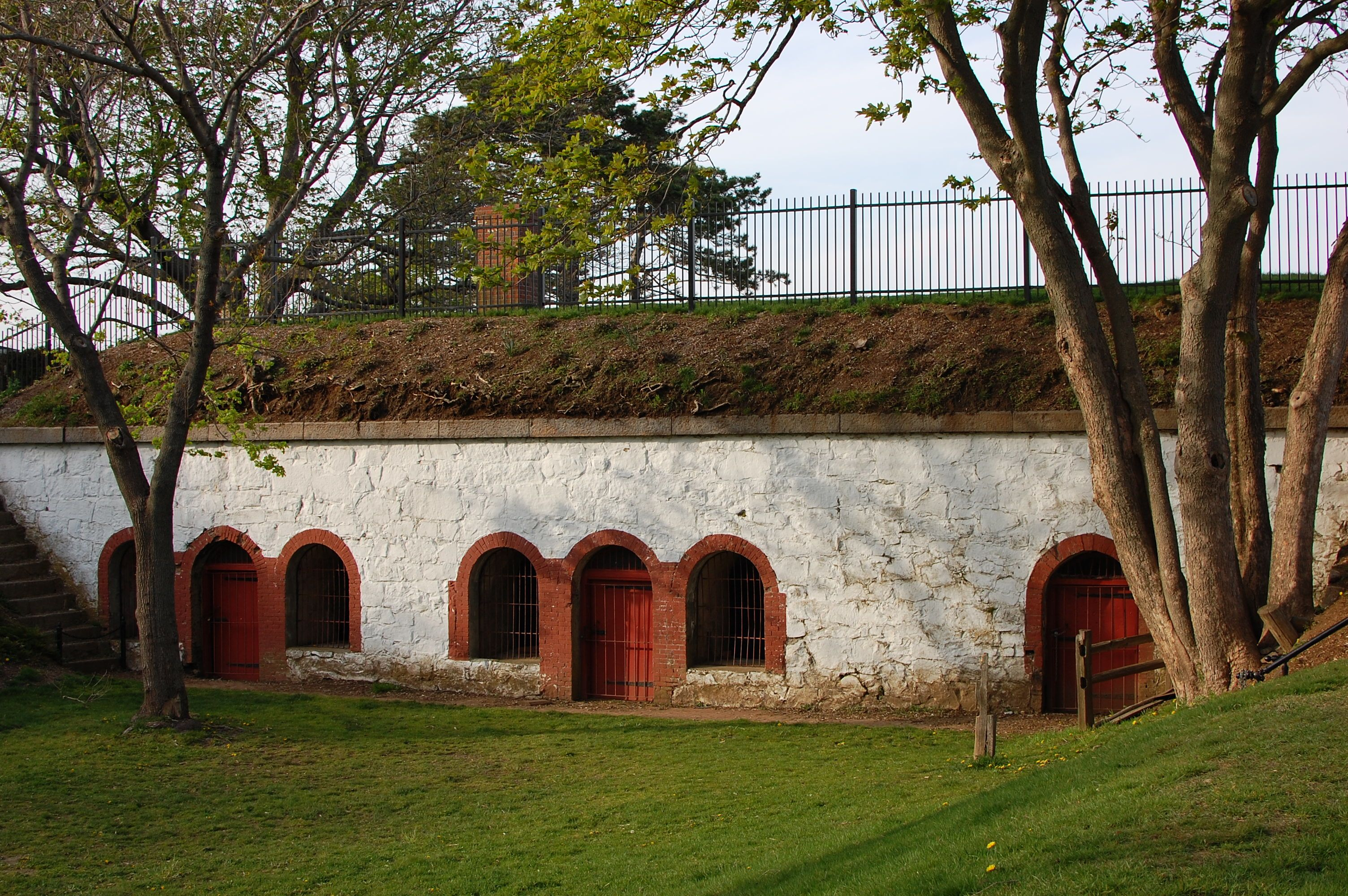
- Fort Sewall bombproof

- Location within Massachusetts Location within the United States
- Location: Marblehead, Massachusetts
- Coordinates: 42°30′32″N 70°50′30″W
- Built: 1634
- Part of: Marblehead Historic District (ID84002402)
- NRHP reference No.: 75001908

Significant dates
- Added to NRHP: April 14, 1975
- Designated CP: January 10, 1984

Fort Sewall is a historic coastal fortification in Marblehead, Massachusetts. It is located at Gale's Head, the northeastern point of the main Marblehead peninsula, on a promontory that overlooks the entrance to Marblehead Harbor. Until 1814 it was called Gale's Head Fort.

== History ==
Gale's Head was first fortified in 1644, and was one of the oldest English coastal fortifications in the United States. A more permanent fortification was built in 1742 during King George's War and it served through the French and Indian War.

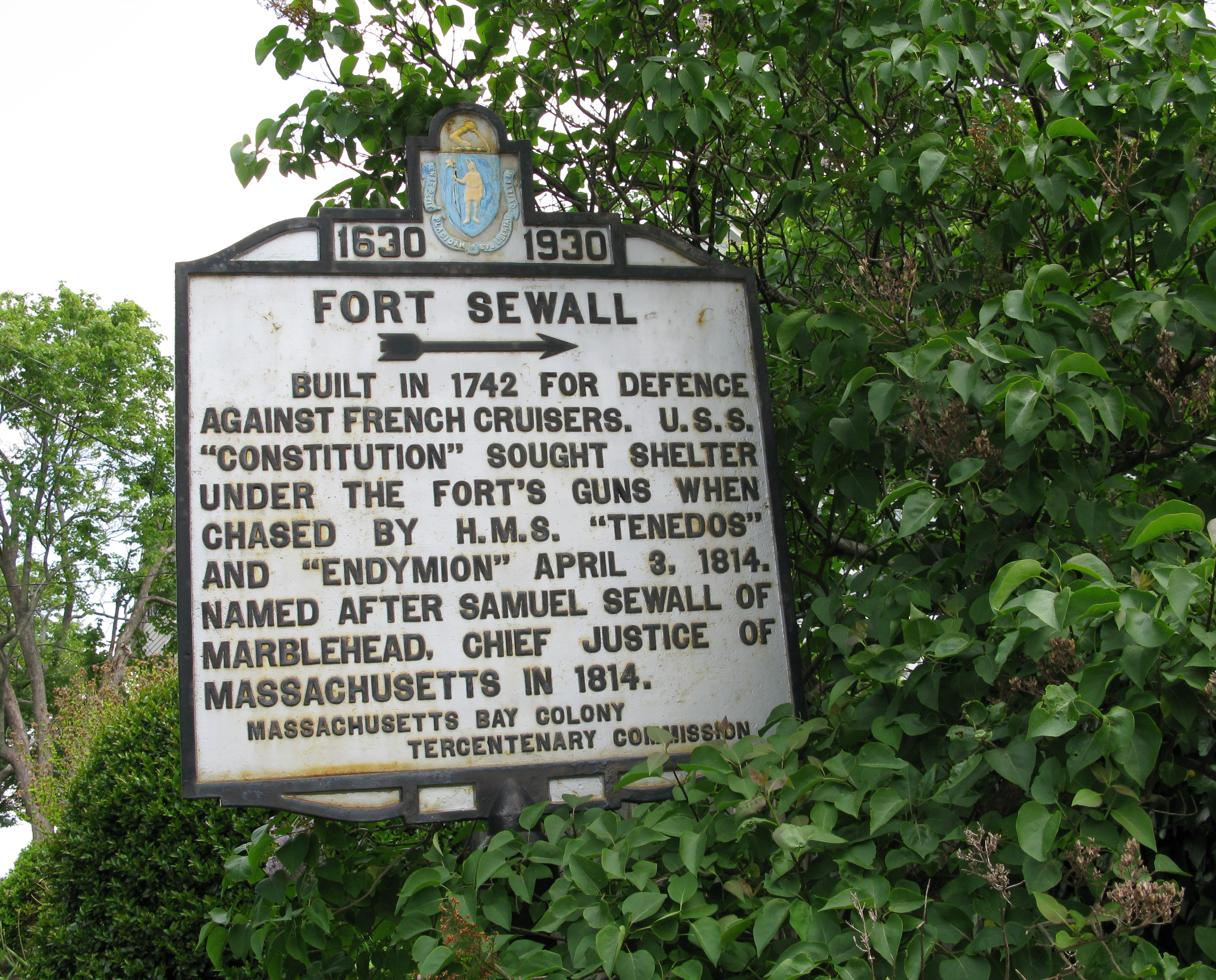
Fort Sewall Historic Marker

Gale's Head Fort was rebuilt in 1775 during the American Revolutionary War. It was garrisoned by Colonel John Glover's Marblehead Regiment in 1775–76.

After the American Revolution, the federal government took over the property during an expansion of the nation's coast defenses from 1794 to 1807, which is known as the First System of U.S. fortifications. A blockhouse was added in 1794, with further rebuilding in 1799; magazines from both of these rebuildings remain. Fort Sewall was also rebuilt in 1809 with 8 guns as part of the Second System (1807 to 1820). The secretary of war's report on fortifications dated December 1811 describes the fort as "an enclosed work of masonry and sods, mounting eight heavy cannon, covered by a blockhouse...".

Regular Army commanders of the fort (combined with Fort Pickering in Salem) from 1800 to 1812 included Capt. Alexander D. Pope 1800–1802, a detachment of Capt. Nehemiah Freeman's company 1802–1803, no federal garrison 1804–1808, and Capt. Stephen Ranney 1809–1812.

=== War of 1812 ===
During the War of 1812, on April 3, 1814, USS Constitution took shelter under the guns of Fort Sewall from a pursuing pair of British frigates, HMS Tenedos and HMS Endymion. Despite lacking the ammunition and powder needed to sink or drive off the two frigates, the fort's garrison was able to bluff the British by running out all of their guns and acting as though they were preparing to attack. Faced with a 44-gun frigate and the defensive batteries of a fort, the British elected to retreat, none the wiser.

In 1814 the fort was named for Samuel Sewall (1757–1814), who served as Chief Justice of the Massachusetts Supreme Court from 1800 until his death in 1814. He was the great-grandson of the Salem witch trials judge of the same name, also a chief justice of the colony's highest court.

From April 1816 to March 1821 Fort Sewall was garrisoned by Company B of the Light Artillery Regiment with about 60 soldiers.

=== Civil War ===
The fort fell into ruins after the War of 1812. During the Civil War, Massachusetts militia troops were garrisoned at Fort Sewall, 12 pieces of artillery were mounted to defend Marblehead Harbor with the fort rebuilt accordingly, and a few Confederate prisoners of war were held there. The fort was nearly doubled in size by 1864 under Army engineer Major Charles E. Blunt, with a bombproof shelter added. A report on the fort's armament dated January 31, 1865 shows one 24-pounder smoothbore gun, eight 24-pounder rifled guns, and three 32-pounder rifled guns.

From May 16, 1864 to August 15, 1864 Fort Sewall was garrisoned by the 11th Unattached Company of the Massachusetts Volunteer Militia (formerly Company I, 8th Regiment Massachusetts Volunteer Militia). On August 15, 1864 the 11th Company was relieved by the 20th Unattached Company (formerly Company E, 4th Regiment Massachusetts Volunteer Militia) which also garrisoned the fort at Salisbury Point in the town of Salisbury. The 20th Company was mustered out shortly after the end of the war on June 29, 1865.

=== Spanish–American War ===
Fort Sewall was seen as no longer needed as a coast defense fort following the Civil War. The last military use of Fort Sewall was during the Spanish–American War in 1898. It was used as the mobilization site for Battery H, 1st Massachusetts Heavy Artillery, commanded by Captain Walter L. Pratt, from June to August, 1898. Battery H was raised in Chelsea and consisted of 3 officers and 58 enlisted men.

=== Current use ===
On May 22, 1892 the Town of Marblehead voted to adopt the fort as a town park, but the fort reverted to federal control during the Spanish–American War in 1898. The fort was turned over to the town by the federal government in 1922, and is now open as a public park. It was listed on the National Register of Historic Places in 1975.

== See also ==
- Fort Miller
- Fort Glover
- National Register of Historic Places listings in Essex County, Massachusetts
- List of coastal fortifications of the United States
- List of military installations in Massachusetts
