= Thomas J. Gargan =

American state legislator

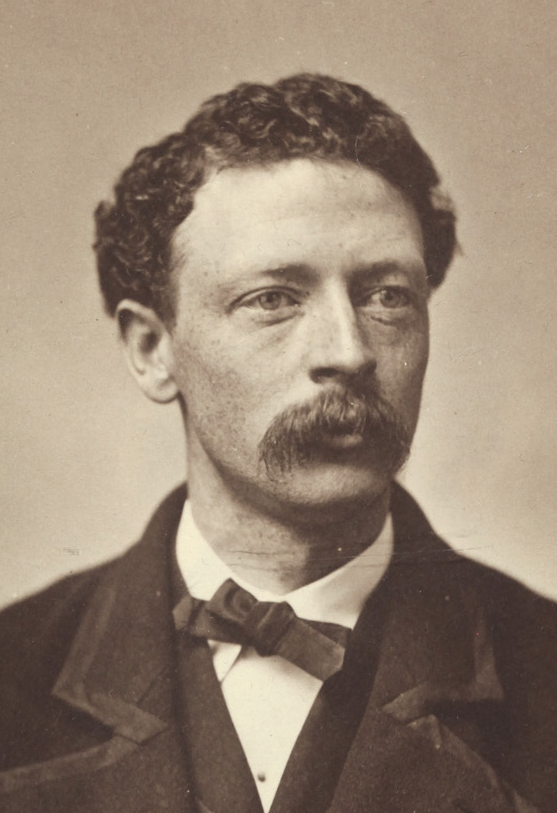

Thomas John Gargan (October 27, 1844 – 1908) was a lawyer, orator, and state legislator.

Gargan was born in Boston to parents Patrick Gargan and Rose née Garland Gargan. He graduated from Boston University with an LL.B. In 1868. In 1870 he was a member of the Massachusetts House of Representatives. He opposed a bill to tax church property. He was a Democrat. He married Helena Nordhoff in 1898. He travelled to Mexico and received medical treatments in Germany.

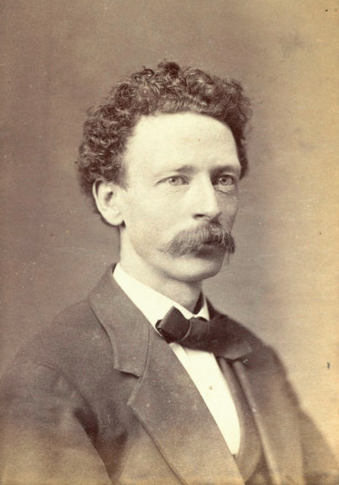

He died in Berlin, Germany. His funeral in Boston was a major event.

== See also ==
- 1868 Massachusetts legislature
- 1870 Massachusetts legislature
- 1876 Massachusetts legislature
