= Hadaway =

Hadaway is an English surname. Notable people with the surname include:

- Henry Hadaway (born 1942), British record producer
- Tom Hadaway (1923–2005), English playwright
- William Snelling Hadaway (1872–1941), American artist

== See also ==
- Haddaway (born 1965), Trinidadian-German singer
- Hathaway (surname)
