= Andrew Jackson Bartholomew =

Massachusetts politician (1834–1899)

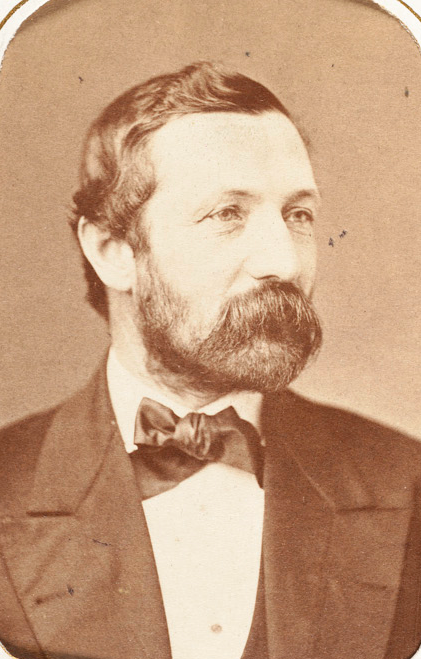
- Bartholomew in 1872
- Born: 1834
- Died: 1899 (aged 64–65)

Andrew Jackson Bartholomew (1834–1899) was a lawyer, public official, politician, and judge in Massachusetts. He served as a state senator in Massachusetts in 1871 and 1872.

He lived in Southbridge, Massachusetts. He served in the Massachusetts House of Representatives in 1867 and the Massachusetts Senate in 1871 and 1872. He was a delegate to the 1876 Republican National Convention in Cincinnati. He married Ellen J. Trow and they had several children.

== See also ==
- 1871 Massachusetts legislature
- 1872 Massachusetts legislature
