= Charles L. Woodbury =

American politician

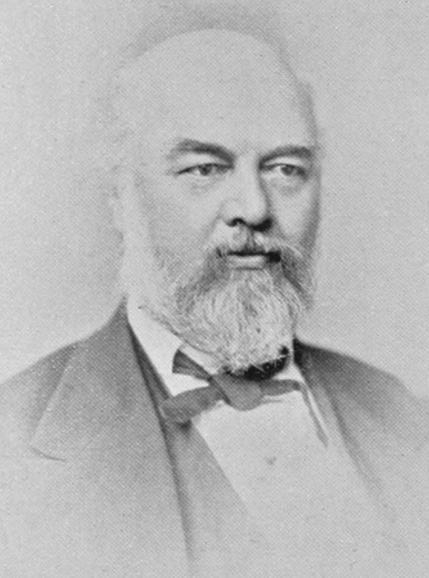

Member of the Massachusetts House of Representatives
- In office 1870–1871
- Constituency: Suffolk County 5th District

U.S. Attorney for the District of Massachusetts
- In office 1857–1861

Member of the New Hampshire House of Representatives
- In office 1857
- Constituency: Portsmouth

Personal details
- Born: Charles Levi Woodbury; May 22, 1820 Portsmouth, New Hampshire
- Died: July 1, 1898 (aged 78) Boston, Massachusetts
- Party: Democratic
- Parent: Levi Woodbury (father)
- Occupation: Lawyer, politician
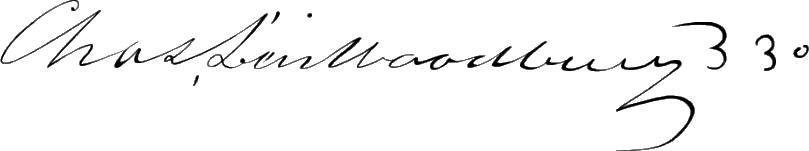
- Signature

Charles Levi Woodbury (May 22, 1820 – July 1, 1898) was an American lawyer, politician, a prominent Freemason.

== Life ==
Woodbury was born on May 22, 1820, in Portsmouth, New Hampshire. His father was Levi Woodbury, a prominent New Hampshire lawyer who served as governor, U.S. senator, Secretary of the Navy, Secretary of the Treasury, and Supreme Court Justice. His mother was Elizabeth Williams Clapp, daughter of Asa Clapp.

Woodbury moved to Washington, D.C., with his parents when he was ten. He attended a select academy there instituted by Salmon P. Chase. He attended Columbia College and the Catholic College in Georgetown, graduating from the latter school at an early age. He studied law, first in the office of United States Attorney General Benjamin F. Butler and then with Roland S. Coxe. Aged twenty, he moved to Lowndes County, Alabama, where he was admitted to the bar and practiced law. He moved to Boston in 1845 and continued his work as a lawyer. Woodbury practiced with future congressman Robert Rantoul Jr. for a few years before striking out on his own. However, in his later career he occasionally associated with younger lawyers, including Charles G. Chick and Josiah P. Tucker. Woodbury jointly edited with George Minot the three-volume Reports of Cases argued and determined in the Circuit Court of the United States for the First District, which contained his father's decisions as judge from 1847 to 1852. He also edited the second and third volume of Levi Woodbury's Writings and wrote pamphlets on the fisheries question and other matters related to diplomatic relations between the United States and Canada.

Woodbury was a delegate and New Hampshire vice-president of the 1856 Democratic National Convention. In 1853, he declined an offer from President Franklin Pierce (who had previously studied law in his father's office) to be Ambassador to Bolivia. He was elected to the New Hampshire House of Representatives in 1857, representing Portsmouth. Later that year, he was appointed U.S. Attorney for the District of Massachusetts. He served as U.S. Attorney until 1861. He then served in the Massachusetts General Court as one of the three representatives of the Suffolk County 5th District in 1870 and 1871. He was a delegate to the 1880 Democratic National Convention and served on its Committee on Resolutions.

Woodbury was a member of the New England Historic Genealogical Society from 1867 until his death. He also served as its vice-president in 1895, and in 1897 he drafted a bill that authorized the admission of women as members of the Society. He was also an honorary member of the Maine Historical Society and the New Hampshire Historical Society. He was involved with the Freemasons and held high offices in the York Rite and Scottish Rite, serving as second officer and on the Board of the Supreme Council, Scottish Rite, Northern Jurisdiction, USA. He was also a trustee for the Grand Lodge of Massachusetts.

Woodbury died in the Parker House in Boston on July 1, 1898. His funeral was in St. Paul's Church. His funeral was attended by, among other people, Albert E. Pillsbury, William S. McNary, Samuel C. Lawrence, and Josiah H. Drummond. He was buried in Harmony Grove Cemetery in Portsmouth, New Hampshire.

Legal offices
Preceded by Benjamin F. Hallett	United States Attorney for the District of Massachusetts; 1857–1861	Succeeded by Richard Henry Dana Jr.
