= James M. Stone =

American politician (1817–1880)

Speaker of the Massachusetts House of Representatives
- In office 1866–1867
- Preceded by: Alexander Bullock
- Succeeded by: Harvey Jewell

Member of the Massachusetts House of Representatives
- In office 1850–1852

Personal details
- Born: James Munroe Stone; August 13, 1817 Westford, Massachusetts, U.S.
- Died: December 19, 1880 (aged 63) Boston, Massachusetts, U.S.

James Munroe Stone (August 13, 1817 – December 19, 1880) was an American labor reform advocate and politician who served as a member, and from 1866 to 1867, the Speaker of, the Massachusetts House of Representatives.

In the early 1840s Stone published the Worcester-based weekly newspaper the State Sentinel, later the State Sentinel and Reformer.

Stone was a major advocate of labor reform in Massachusetts, he worked for years to pass the Ten Hour work day legislation in Massachusetts.

Massachusetts House of Representatives
Preceded by Alexander H. Bullock	Speaker of the Massachusetts House of Representatives; 1866 — 1867	Succeeded by Harvey Jewell

== See also ==
- 88th Massachusetts General Court (1867)
