= Orlando Barnard Tenney =

American State Senator (born 1816)

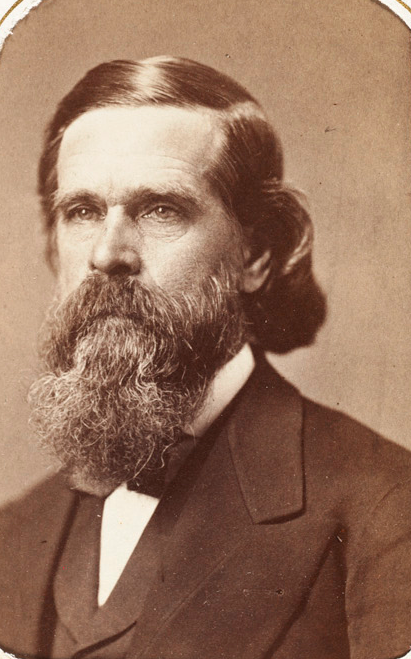
- Portrait c. 1870
- Born: December 18, 1816; Salem, Massachusetts

Orlando Barnard Tenney (December 18, 1816–?) was a state senator in Massachusetts. He was born in Salem, Massachusetts. He also served as a selectman in Georgetown, Massachusetts.

He lived in Georgetown, Massachusetts. He served as a trial justice. He was treasurer of the Georgetown Savings Bank.

== See also ==
- 1870 Massachusetts legislature
- 1871 Massachusetts legislature
