= Ann's Diner =

- U.S. National Register of Historic Places
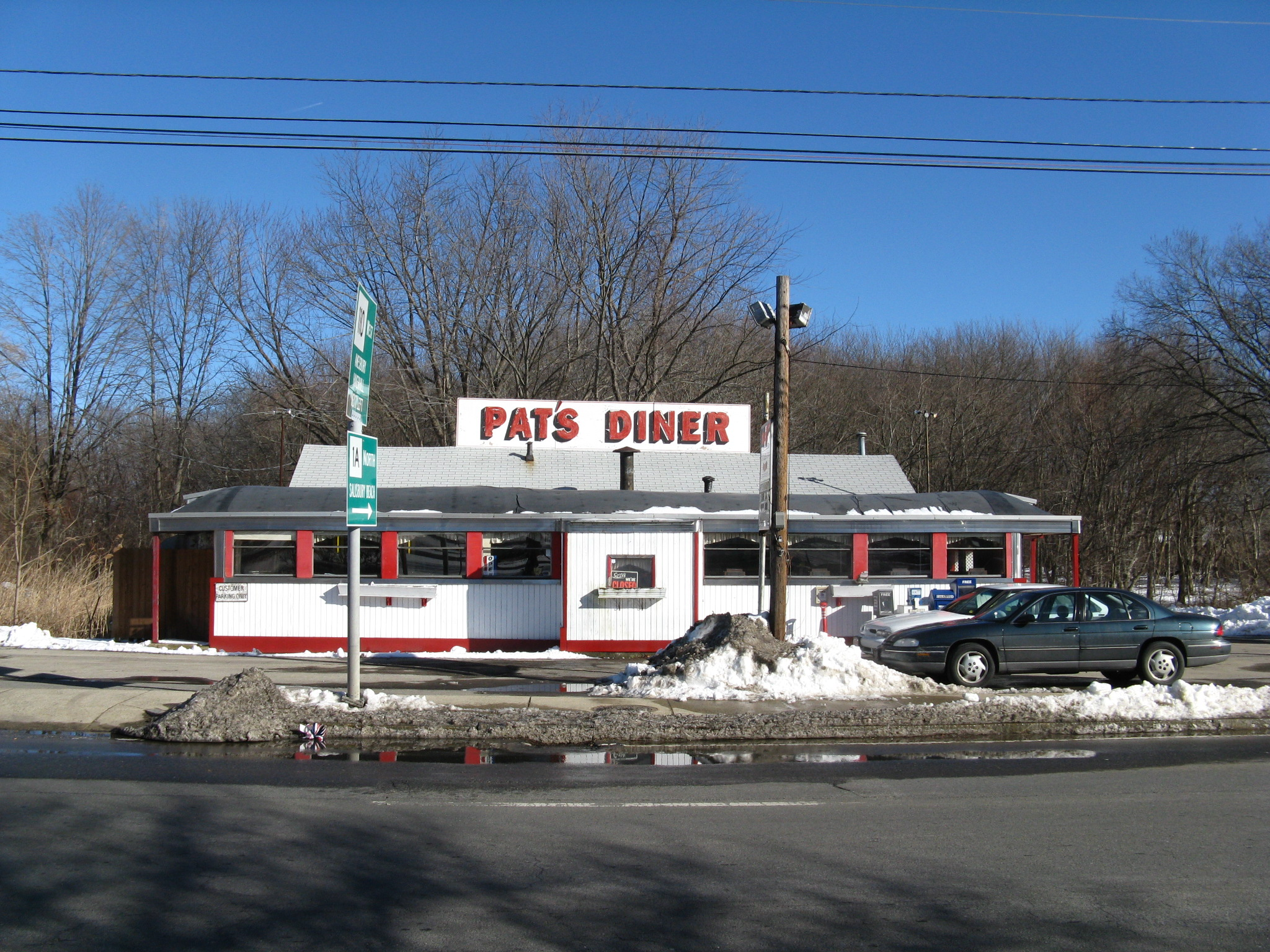
- Ann's Diner (now Pat's Diner)

- Location within Massachusetts Location within the United States
- Location: Salisbury, Massachusetts
- Coordinates: 42°50′24″N 70°51′40″W
- Built: 1950
- Architect: Worcester Lunch Car Company
- MPS: Diners of Massachusetts MPS
- NRHP reference No.: 03001264
- Added to NRHP: December 10, 2003

Ann's Diner (now known as Pat's Diner) is a historic diner at 11 Bridge Road (US Route 1) in Salisbury, Massachusetts, United States.

The diner was built in 1950 as #824 by the Worcester Lunch Car Company, as a custom job for James and Ann Evans. They had opened their first diner in Haverhill, also called Ann's Diner, in 1948, and moved it to the present site later that year. The business was successful enough that they ordered the present diner as a replacement. It was specifically designed to accommodate a separate dining room, and was opened in April 1950. The Evanses owned the business until 1960, after which it went through a succession of owners. From 1976 to 1987 it was owned by Norman Brockelbank and known as Norm's Place. The diner was closed between 1997 and 1999. In 1999 it was acquired by Pat Archambault, who restored it and reopened it as Pat's Diner.

The diner is a classic barrel-roof diner, nine window bays long and three deep. The original entrances to the diner were at its ends, but the left one has been repurposed as a site for heating and ventilation equipment. The right side door retains its original steel door with sunburst motif, and the middle bay window on the front facade has been replaced by an entrance that projects from the diner's body. The barrel roof is covered by a rubber membrane, and extends to porches that covered the entrances at the ends.

Behind the diner body is a wood frame single story structure, which houses the kitchen and restrooms. Unlike many New England diners, this structure has a gable roof. The diner's interior is unusual for its custom configuration. The right six bays have a typical interior setup, with four booths and fourteen counter stools, while the left three bays have a dining room arrangement. This area is separated from the counter area by a pocket door, and has six booths, three each lining the front and back walls.

The building was added to the National Register of Historic Places on December 10, 2003.

The diner closed in 2021 and was sold.

== See also ==
- National Register of Historic Places listings in Essex County, Massachusetts
