= Fort at Salisbury Point =

American Civil War fort in Maryland

- Salisbury Beach, Salisbury, Massachusetts

Site information
- Type: Coastal defense
- Owner: Commonwealth of Massachusetts
- Condition: no remains, beach eroded

Location
- Location in Massachusetts Fort at Salisbury Point (the United States)
- Coordinates: 42°49′8.58″N 70°49′12.49″W

Site history
- Built: 1863
- Built by: Major Charles E. Blunt, US Army
- In use: 1863–1865
- Materials: earthworks
- Battles/wars: American Civil War

Garrison information
- Garrison: 20th Unattached Company of Massachusetts militia

The Fort at Salisbury Point was a fort in use from 1863 to 1865 in Salisbury, Massachusetts, during the American Civil War. It was also called the Fort at Salisbury Beach. It was a nine-gun earthwork located at the mouth of the Merrimack River at what is now the Salisbury Beach State Reservation, where eventual erosion washed it away. A 1903 reference states it was on the site of the Revolutionary War Fort Nichols, but that site is in doubt, and may have been at the location called Salisbury Point in Amesbury, several miles up the river. The Fort at Salisbury Point was sometimes referred to by local civilians as Fort Nichols in the Civil War era. The fort was designed and built under the supervision of Major Charles E. Blunt of the United States Army Corps of Engineers. An armament report dated June 30, 1866 lists nine heavy guns and one 12-pounder field gun. The heavy guns were three 8-inch smoothbore Rodman guns, three 42-pounder rifled guns, and three 30-pounder rifled guns. From November 1864 to June 1865 it was garrisoned by the 20th Unattached Company of Massachusetts militia. The Museum at Salisbury Point commemorates the soldiers who fought in the war.

== See also ==
- List of military installations in Massachusetts
