= Stephen Moody Crosby =

American politician (1827–1909)

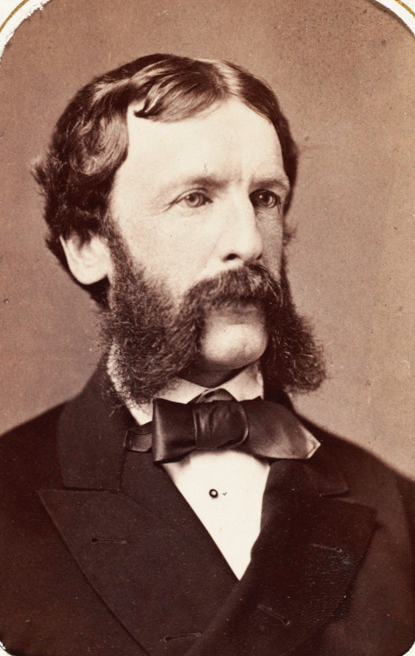

Member of the Massachusetts House of Representatives
- In office 1869

Member of the Massachusetts Senate
- In office 1870–1871

Personal details
- Born: August 14, 1827 Salisbury, Massachusetts, U.S.
- Died: 1909 (aged 81–82)
- Spouse: Anna Hayden (m. 1855)
- Parent: Nathan Crosby (father)
- Education: Dartmouth College, Harvard Law School
- Occupation: Banker, lawyer, politician

Military service
- Allegiance: Union Army
- Rank: Lieutenant colonel

Stephen Moody Crosby (August 14, 1827 – August 1909) was an American banker, lawyer, and politician in Massachusetts. He served in the Massachusetts House of Representatives in 1869, and in the Massachusetts Senate in 1870 and 1871.

== Life and career ==
Stephen Moody Crosby was born on August 14, 1827, in Salisbury, Massachusetts. His parents were Rebecca Moddy and Judge Nathan Crosby. Asa Crosby his grandfather.

Crosby graduated from Dartmouth College in 1849, and Harvard Law School in 1852. He passed the Massachusetts Bar in 1852.

Crosby and Anna Hayden married in 1855. He was a Unitarian, and a member of the Second Church in Boston.

He was an officer in the Union Army during the American Civil War, reaching the ranks of the lieutenant colonel.

Crosby was the president of the Butte and Boston Mining Company. Additionally he was the treasurer of the Mexico Consolidated Mining Company, and a trustee of the Franklin Savings Bank. He was president of the Boston Art Club for ten years.

Crosby served in the Massachusetts House of Representatives in 1869, and served in the Massachusetts Senate in 1870 and 1871.

== See also ==
- 1870 Massachusetts legislature
- 1871 Massachusetts legislature
