= 1871 Massachusetts legislature =

92nd Massachusetts General Court
←	91st	93rd	→

Overview
- Legislative body: General Court
- Election: November 8, 1870

Senate
- Members: 40
- President: Horace H. Coolidge
- Party control: Republican (34 R, 5 D, 1 other)

House
- Members: 240
- Speaker: Harvey Jewell
- Party control: Republican (195 R, 34 D, 11 other)

Sessions
- 1st: January 4, 1871 – May 31, 1871

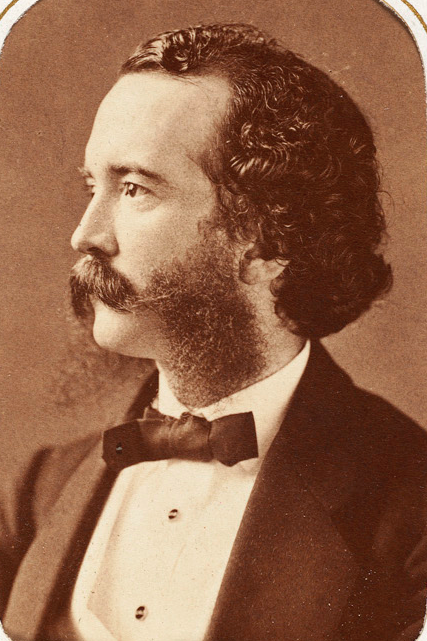
Horace Coolidge, Senate president.

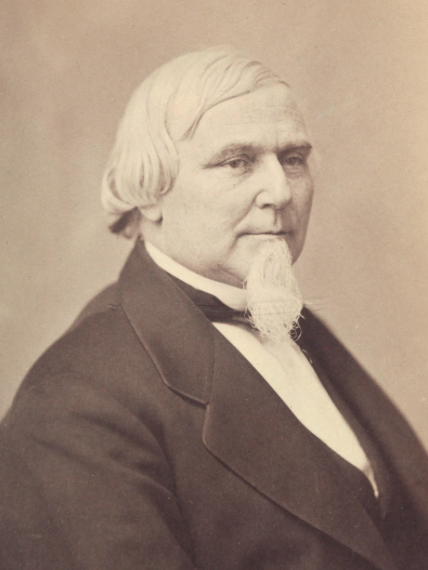
Harvey Jewell, House speaker.

Leaders of the Massachusetts General Court, 1871.

The 92nd Massachusetts General Court, consisting of the Massachusetts Senate and the Massachusetts House of Representatives, met in 1871 during the governorship of Republican William Claflin. Horace H. Coolidge served as president of the Senate and Harvey Jewell served as speaker of the House.

== Senators ==
Image	Name	Date of birth	District	Party
	Nathaniel Ellis Atwood	September 13, 1807		
	Andrew Jackson Bartholomew	1834		
	Jacob Bates	1819		
	Francis William Bird	1809		
	Alonzo Warren Boardman	1828		
	Charles Bradley	1816		
	William Hooper Caswell	1837		
	Andrew Jackson Clark	1835		
	James Wilson Clark	1802		
	Patrick Andrew Collins	March 12, 1844		
	Horace Hopkins Coolidge	February 11, 1832		
	Stephen Moody Crosby	1827		
	George Perkins Elliott	1804		
	John Fletcher	1827		
	James Augustus Fox	August 11, 1827		
	Rufus Smith Frost	July 18, 1826		
	Richard Goodman	1818		
	Henry Clay Greeley	1830		
	John Alexander Hawes	1823		
	Estes Howe	1814		
	Nathan Swett Kimball	1820		
	William Bennet Long	1827		
	George Harris Monroe	1826		
	Timothy Fairbanks Packard	1812		
	William Driver Park	1831		
	James Pierce	1837		
	Stephen Holbrook Rhodes	November 7, 1825		
	George Francis Richardson	December 6, 1829		
	Daniel Ephraim Safford	1826		
	James Granville Sproat	1835		
	George Monroe Stearns	April 18, 1831		
	Charles Pickett Stickney	1824		
	Orlando Barnard Tenney	1816		
	Adin Thayer	1828		
	Shepard Thayer	1827		
	Thomas Lafayette Wakefield	1817		
	Amasa Whiting	1821		
	Baxter Dodridge Whitney	1817		
	Frederick H. Willcomb	1831		
	Jonathan Henry Wood	1822		

== Representatives ==
- Henry S. Adams
- John Quincy Adams II
- Charles L. Allen
- James S. Allen
- William H. Anderson
- Francis P. Arnold
- William F. Arnold
- George H. Babbitt Jr.
- Andrew J. Bailey
- Prentiss C. Baird
- John I. Baker
- Joseph K. Baker
- Irwin D. W. Baldwin
- John S. Baldwin
- Henry J. Barker
- William Barker Jr.
- Lewis Barnard
- Daniel N. Barrett
- Leonard Barton
- John T. Bates
- Alanson W. Beard
- Alden Besse
- Henry A. Bidwell
- Gurdon Bill
- Arthur G. Biscoe
- Lowell R. Blake
- William E. Blunt
- Josiah W. Bonney
- Frederick A. Boomer
- Sylvester F. Boot
- Robert Bower
- Selwin Bowman
- Phineas Bridgman
- Elisha Brimhall
- Ebenezer Brown
- Frederick P. Brown
- Willard A. Brown
- Stephen A. Brownell
- George Buffington
- John R. Bullard
- James T. Burnap
- Henry O. Burr
- Theophilus Burr
- Samuel Calley
- Michael Carney
- Solon Carpenter
- David Chamberlin
- Erastus Chase
- Elijah H. Chisholm
- John H. Church
- John B. D. Cogswell
- William Cogswell
- George J. L. Colby
- Justin M. Cooley
- Benjamin H. Corliss
- Joseph H. Cornell
- Charles A. Corser
- John S. Cotton
- Joseph H. Cotton
- Samuel L. Crane
- Zenas Crane Jr.
- James C. Currier
- Henry J. Curtis
- Avery R. Cushman
- Jacob R. Cushman
- Robert S. Daniels
- Curtis Davie
- George E. Davis
- Timothy Davis
- William L. Davis
- Joseph Dowse Jr.
- John Drynan
- George S. Duell
- Henry J. Dunham
- Lemuel C. Eames
- Samuel S. Eastman
- Samuel P. Everett
- George O. Fairbanks
- James O. Fallon
- Hawkes Fearing
- Alfred E. Fiske
- John E. Fitzgerald
- John D. Flagg
- Hugh Flood
- Thomas Floyd
- Jonathan P. Folsom
- Moses H. Fowler
- Benjamin Franklin
- Robert O. Fuller
- Levi Gardner
- Robert F. Gardner
- George W. Gates
- Thomas Gates
- George D. Glover
- George Going
- Henry A. Goodrich
- Henry Goodspeed
- Lafayette Granger
- Davis P. Gray
- Edward W. Griggs
- Charles H. Guild
- Joseph M. Hall
- Franklin P. Harlow
- Henry H. Harris
- Thomas B. Harris
- A. K. Haskell
- Cephas Haskins
- Bainbridge Hayward
- Paul Hayward
- Stephen Hayward Jr.
- Horatio B. Hersey
- Orrin Hewes
- Levi Heywood
- Thomas Hill
- Stephen Holt
- Thomas Holway
- Samuel W. Hopkinson
- Charles H. Hovey
- Daniel Howard
- Ezra Howard
- George H. Howe
- Samuel Howe
- Elisha Hubbard
- John Hume
- Theodore C. Hurd
- Edwin H. Hutchinson
- Francis James
- Nathaniel M. Jernegan
- Harvey Jewell
- Joseph P. Johnson
- Robert Johnson
- Albert F. Kelley
- Ensign H. Kellogg
- Ozi Kendall
- Moses Kimball
- John A. Lamson
- Albert Leighton
- Benjamin F. Lewis
- Edward Lewis
- Welcome Lewis
- G. H. Lincoln
- Martin Lincoln
- Noah Lincoln
- Caleb Lombard
- Edward T. Lyford
- Hugh A. Madden
- Israel P. Magoun
- Orlando Mason
- John McDuffie
- Curtis C. Mchols
- Alexander McKenzie
- John W. McKim
- John O. McKinstry
- Thomas H. Meek
- William R. Melden
- Charles H. Merriam
- Alfred K. Merrill
- Moody Merrill
- George P. Metcalf
- Ira L. Moore
- George W. Morton
- William Mulligan
- John J. Murphy
- Peter M. Neal
- J. S. Nelson
- John Newell
- Silas Noble
- George Nowell
- William Nutt
- John P. Ober
- Weaver Osborn
- Stephen Osgood
- Lyman Paine
- George A. Parker
- Edwin K. Parkhurst
- Ezra Parmenter
- Lloyd Parsons
- George H. Peabody
- Edward Pearl
- Ellis Perry
- William A. Pew
- Willard P. Phillips
- Nathaniel Pierce
- J. Newton Pike
- Charles Y. Poor
- Asa T. Pratt
- Laban Pratt
- Humphrey Prescott
- Charles L. Putnam
- George Putnam
- Samuel B. Quigley
- Lawrence Reade
- John W. Regan
- A. L. Richards
- Martin L. Richardson
- Isaac N. Ross
- George L. Ruffin
- Joseph M. Russell
- John E. Sanford
- Benjamin P. Saunders
- George F. Scribner
- Harvey Severance
- Henry H. Shaw
- James S. Shepard
- H. D. Sisson
- Hambleton E. Smith
- James G. Smith
- George C. S. Southworth
- Walter Spooner
- Francis D. Stedman
- Hiram A. Stiles
- Thomas Swasey, Jr
- Calvin R. Taft
- John K. Tarbox
- Charles P. Thompson
- Edward E. Thompson
- Eben Tirrell, Jr
- Hugh J. Toland
- Joseph R. Torrey
- George E. Towne
- Charles R. Train
- David W. Tucker
- Samuel J. Tuttle
- Samuel W. Twombly
- George H. Vibbert
- Charles F. Walcott
- Welcome H. Wales
- Stephen Wallace
- E. H. Walton
- James J. Walworth
- Henry S. Washburn
- Nathan H. Webb
- George L. Webber
- Edwin Wheeler
- Emerson Wight
- Charles L. Woodbury
- Joseph A. Woodward
- Luther A. Wright
- George T. Wyer

== See also ==
- 42nd United States Congress
- List of Massachusetts General Courts
