= Henry Clay Greeley =

American politician

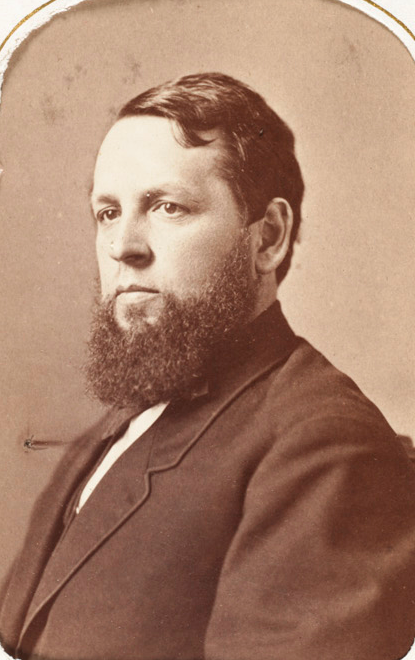

Henry Clay Greeley was an American politician in Massachusetts who served in the Massachusetts Senate in 1870 and 1871.

He was a clerk and selectman of Worcester. He was a member of Worcester's Executive Council in 1885 and 1886.

In 1897 he was treasurer of the Mary Lamb Fund and Fay Fund. He was also treasurer of the Lyman and Industrial Schools. He lived in Clinton, Massachusetts at the time.

He served on Governor Robinson's council. He was a director and incorporator of the First National Bank of Clinton.

== See also ==
- 1870 Massachusetts legislature
- 1871 Massachusetts legislature
