= Fort Glover =

Historical fort in Marblehead, MA

- Marblehead, Massachusetts

Site information
- Type: Coastal Defense

Location
- Location in Massachusetts Fort Glover (the United States)
- Coordinates: 42°29′40.92″N 70°51′22.69″W

Site history
- Built: 1775
- In use: 1775–1898
- Materials: earthwork
- Demolished: 1917
- Battles/wars: American Revolutionary War

Fort Glover was a fort in Marblehead, Massachusetts. Fortifications on the site existed during the American Revolutionary War, the War of 1812, the Civil War, and the Spanish–American War. The fort was located on what is now Riverhead Beach on Ocean Ave in Marblehead, sited to guard the beach and the Marblehead Neck causeway. It was demolished in 1917.

It was originally built in 1775 for the Revolutionary War as the Huit's Head Battery. It was rebuilt in the War of 1812 as the Gilbert Heights Fort, garrisoned 1813–1815. It was rebuilt again for the Civil War in 1863 as a three-gun earthwork battery. It was named in honor of John Glover, a Revolutionary War general from Marblehead. He commanded the Marblehead Regiment and provided his own ship Hannah as the first warship in United States service (hired by the Continental Army, as the Continental Navy had not yet been authorized). A plan dated September 1864 and an armament report dated January 31, 1865 show the fort was armed with one 32-pounder rifled gun and two 8-inch smoothbore guns. It was rebuilt for the Spanish–American War in 1898, and abandoned after that.

After 1898 it gained the nickname "Cow Fort", after the cattle that resided within its former walls. The fort was demolished in 1917, although a portion of the site called "Cow Fort Farm" became part of Seaside Park in 1895.

== See also ==
- Fort Miller
- Fort Sewall
- List of military installations in Massachusetts

== Sources ==
- Manuel, Dale A. (Summer 2019). "Massachusetts North Shore Civil War Forts". Coast Defense Journal. Vol. 33, no. 3. Mclean, Virginia: CDSG Press.
- Roberts, Robert B. (1988). Encyclopedia of Historic Forts: The Military, Pioneer, and Trading Posts of the United States. New York: Macmillan. ISBN 0-02-926880-X.
