= Harvey Jewell =

American politician

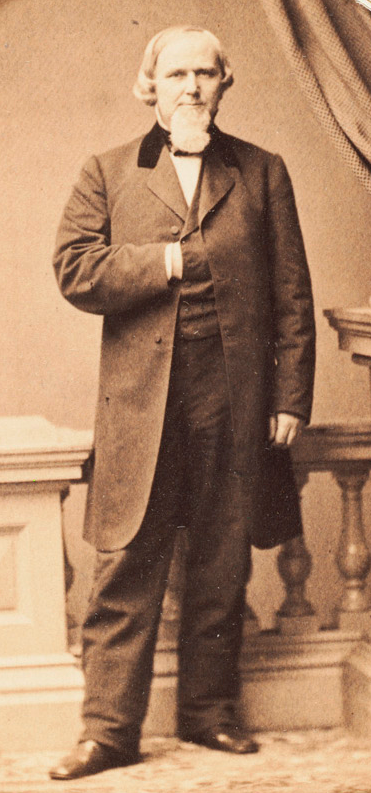

Speaker of the Massachusetts House of Representatives Worcester, Massachusetts
- In office 1868–1871
- Preceded by: James M. Stone
- Succeeded by: John E. Sanford

Member of the Massachusetts House of Representatives
- In office 1861–1871

Personal details
- Born: May 26, 1820 Winchester, New Hampshire
- Died: December 8, 1881 (aged 61) Boston, Massachusetts
- Resting place: Mount Auburn Cemetery
- Party: Whig; Republican
- Spouse: Susan A. Bradley (m. 1849)
- Education: Dartmouth College, 1844
- Profession: Lawyer

Harvey Jewell (May 26, 1820 – December 8, 1881) was a U.S. lawyer and politician who served as the Speaker of the Massachusetts House of Representatives from 1868 to 1871.

== Biography ==
Jewell was born in Winchester, New Hampshire on May 26, 1820, the first of ten children born to Pliny and Emily Alexander Jewell. (Note: Some sources give his birthdate as June 26.) His younger brother, Marshall Jewell (1825-1883) would later be elected Governor of Connecticut and would serve as President Grant's United States Postmaster General.

Jewell graduated from Dartmouth College in 1844. He moved to Boston, Massachusetts, in 1847 where he began his legal career and became active in local and state politics. He wed Susan A. Bradley on December 26, 1849.

Jewell was originally a Whig until the dissolution of the party in the 1850s and later became a Republican. In 1861 he was elected to the Massachusetts House of Representatives and was re-elected for the 1862 session. He returned again to serve from 1866 until 1871, serving his last four 1-year terms as Speaker. Jewell acquired a reputation for "able and impartial rulings." After his retirement from the general court, he served on the Court of Commissioners of Alabama Claims from 1875 to 1876.

At his residence on Beacon Street in Boston, he owned "a magnificent library, stored with the choicest and most valuable gems of literature." Jewell was an enthusiastic fisherman, and an expert in the capture of striped bass off the rocks at Swampscott, Massachusetts, where he had a summer cottage.

Jewell died at his home in Boston at the age of 61 on December 8, 1881. He was buried at Mount Auburn Cemetery.

== See also ==
- 89th Massachusetts General Court (1868)
- 90th Massachusetts General Court (1869)
- 91st Massachusetts General Court (1870)
- 92nd Massachusetts General Court (1871)

== Notes ==
Massachusetts House of Representatives
Preceded by James M. Stone	Speaker of the Massachusetts House of Representatives; 1868–1871	Succeeded by John E. Sanford
