= Jane Hathaway =

Jane Hathaway may refer to:

- Jane Hathaway (Beverly Hillbillies character), a character in The Beverly Hillbillies
- Jane Hathaway, pseudonym for composer John Stepan Zamecnik
- Jane Hathaway (academic), former president in the Turkish Studies Association

== See also ==
- Hathaway (surname)
- John Hathaway (disambiguation)
