= Salisbury Beach Military Reservation =

- Part of Harbor Defenses of Boston, later Harbor Defenses of Portsmouth
- Salisbury, Massachusetts
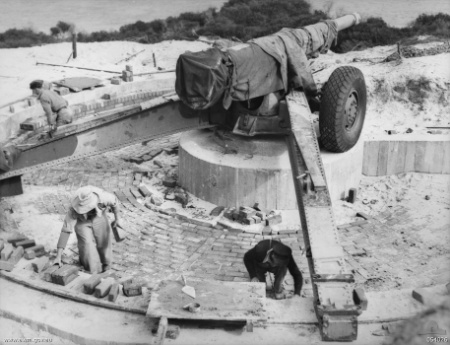
- A 155 mm gun, similar to those at Salisbury Beach, on a Panama mount.

Site information
- Type: Coastal Defense
- Owner: Massachusetts
- Controlled by: Salisbury Beach State Reservation

Location
- Location in Massachusetts
- Coordinates: 42°49′35.4″N 70°49′2.8″W

Site history
- Built: 1941
- Built by: United States Army
- In use: 1941-1945
- Battles/wars: World War II

Salisbury Beach Military Reservation was a coastal defense site located in Salisbury, Massachusetts.

== History ==
The Salisbury Beach Military Reservation was built on state land in 1941. Its mission was to protect the Merrimack River and Newburyport Harbor from possible air and naval attack. The site had four "Panama mounts" (circular concrete platforms) for four towed 155 mm guns. It never fired its guns in anger, though it did play an important part in the defense of the harbor. It was initially part of the Harbor Defenses of Boston (HD Boston). A handwritten note on the US Army Corps of Engineers' Report of Completed Works indicates it was transferred to the Harbor Defenses of Portsmouth with the construction of a fire control structure supporting Fort Dearborn, which was part of those defenses. Battery F of the 9th Coast Artillery Regiment initially garrisoned Salisbury Beach on 2 October 1941, and was redesignated Battery C on 10 October 1941. The gun mounts were 1,500 ft (460 m) north of the Merrimack River's mouth. Construction began on 18 April 1942, and the mountings were transferred to the operating forces on 7 July 1942. Two of the weapons were removed in November 1943.

The fire control structure was designated Location 137B, was designed to resemble a beach house, and was completed in October 1943. It was north of the intersection of Route 1A and the coast road, in front of the line of beach houses. It provided target data to the 16 in (406 mm) guns of Battery Seaman at Fort Dearborn as Base-End Station No. 4. The building had three stories and a cupola on the roof. The cupola was an observation post for the Anti-Aircraft Intelligence Service. The upper floor was the base-end station, the middle floor had a fire control switchboard, and the ground floor's function is unclear; it was possibly barracks space. Other fire control sites for HD Portsmouth in Massachusetts were at Plum Island, Crane Beach, and Halibut Point. The latter two were shared with HD Boston, and only the last remains.

The reservation was returned to the Commonwealth in 1945; the fire control station became a Massachusetts State Police barracks until it was destroyed by a storm on 2 April 1958.

=== The site today ===
Today the site is home to Salisbury Beach State Reservation, a recreational beach. Two of the mounts are sometimes visible after storms; the other two are buried (as of 1978).

== See also ==
- Seacoast defense in the United States
- United States Army Coast Artillery Corps
- List of military installations in Massachusetts
