= Elisha Brimhall =

Massachusetts politician (1825–1887)

Elisha Brimhall (March 25, 1825 – April 9, 1887) was an American businessman and state legislator who served in the Massachusetts House of Representatives in 1871, and the Massachusetts Senate in 1876–1877.

He was born in Oakham, Massachusetts, and was only child of Jonas and Caroline née Nye Brimhall.

He moved to Clinton, Massachusetts in 1847. He was a Republican. He had a mansion on Prescott Street. He served as a selectman. He was Clinton's treasurer. He met with U.S. president Abraham Lincoln. He had a building built in Clinton, Massachusetts.

== See also ==
- 1871 Massachusetts legislature
- 1876 Massachusetts legislature
- 1877 Massachusetts legislature
