= Winifred Hathaway =

Welsh-born American educator

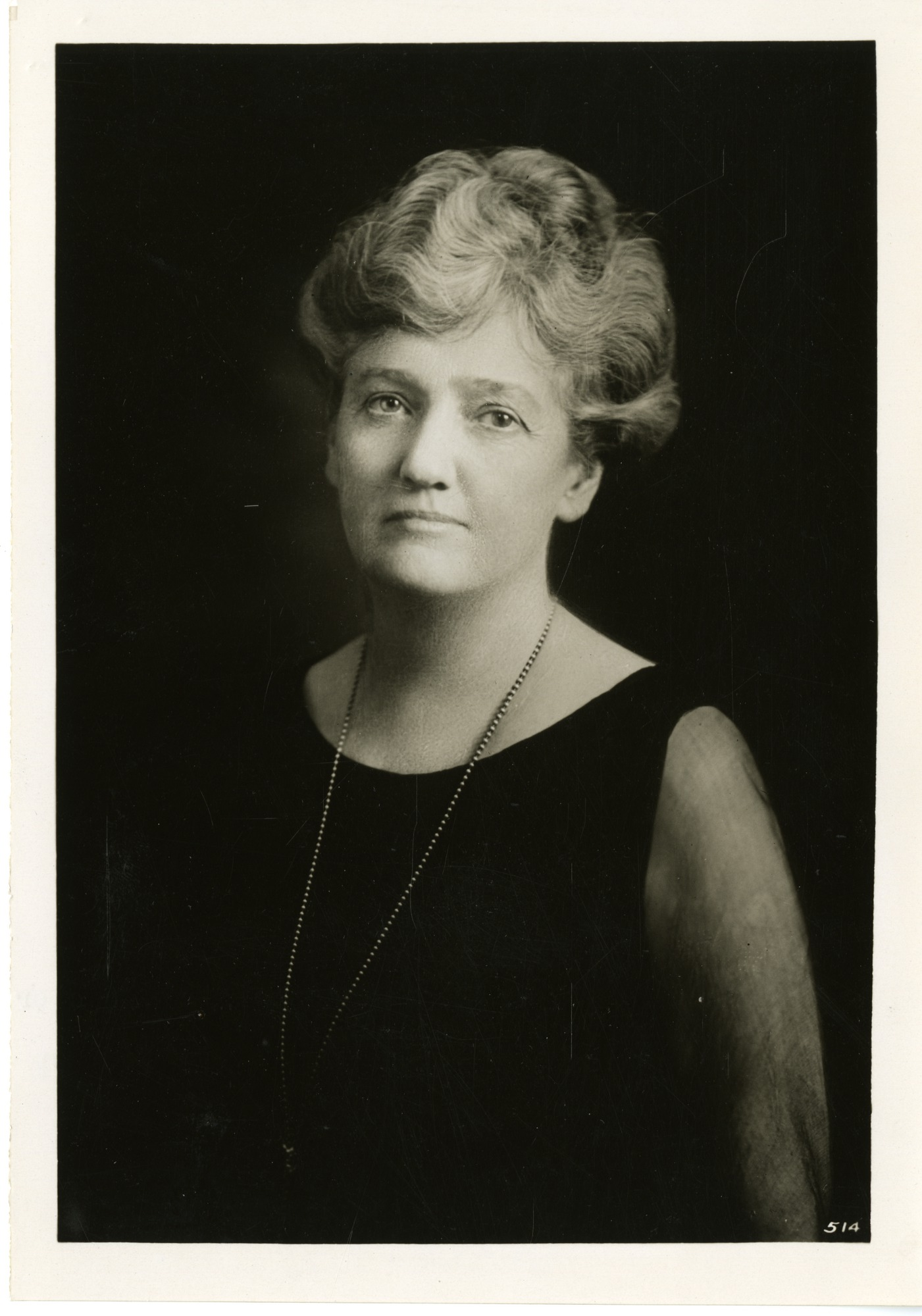
Winifred Phillips Hathaway, photographed in 1937.

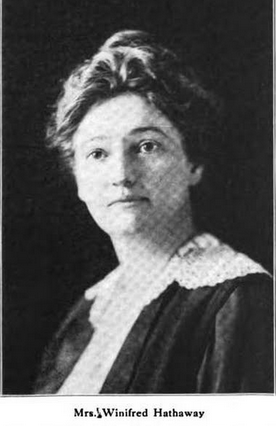
Winifred Hathaway, from a 1917 publication.

Winifred Phillips Hathaway (1870 — December 1, 1954) was a Welsh-born American educator. She was secretary and associate director of the National Society of the Prevention of Blindness from 1916 to 1949.

== Early life ==
Winifred H. Phillips was born in Pembrokeshire, Wales, the daughter of Daniel Phillips and Mary Morgan Phillips. She was educated at the Normal College of New York, completing teacher training in 1893. She earned an undergraduate degree at Radcliffe College in economics and social ethics, and a master's degree at New York University. For her graduate studies, she conducted research at the Eugenics Records Office in Cold Springs Harbor, and worked with Charles B. Davenport.

== Career ==
Phillips taught school in New York City, and at Hunter College, where she was head of the history department. She became secretary of the National Society of the Prevention of Blindness in 1916. That same year, she attended the Eugenics Research Association conference, and served on that organization's executive council. She was one of the speakers at Harvard University's "Course on the Education of the Blind" in 1920. She advocated especially for the schoolchild with partial sight, and for "sightsaving" measures such as improved classroom lighting, appropriate seating, glasses, and adapted reading materials. She also supported library practices to assist readers with low vision in locating suitable materials. Her work involved a great deal of travel, including a 1927 lecture tour through 16 states, and a 1932 lecture tour of the American west coast and Hawaii.

She was awarded the Leslie Dana Gold Medal by the St. Louis Society for the Blind in 1937. She was the second woman so honored; the first was Hathaway's mentor, Louisa Lee Schuyler, in 1926. Hathaway retired in 1949. She received the Ambrose M. Shotwell Award in 1950.

Publications by Hathaway include The Importance of Eye Health in Occupational Therapy (1929), Well-Lighted Schoolhouse: A Cooperative Effort (1930). and the textbook Education and Health of the Partially Sighted Child (1943).

== Personal life and legacy ==
Winifred H. Phillips married George Adelbert Hathaway, a Unitarian clergyman, in 1904. Winifred Hathaway died in 1954, aged 84 years. In 1959, the National Society for the Prevention of Blindness established a Winifred Hathaway Award in her memory.
