= Salisbury Beach State Reservation =

State reserve in Massachusetts

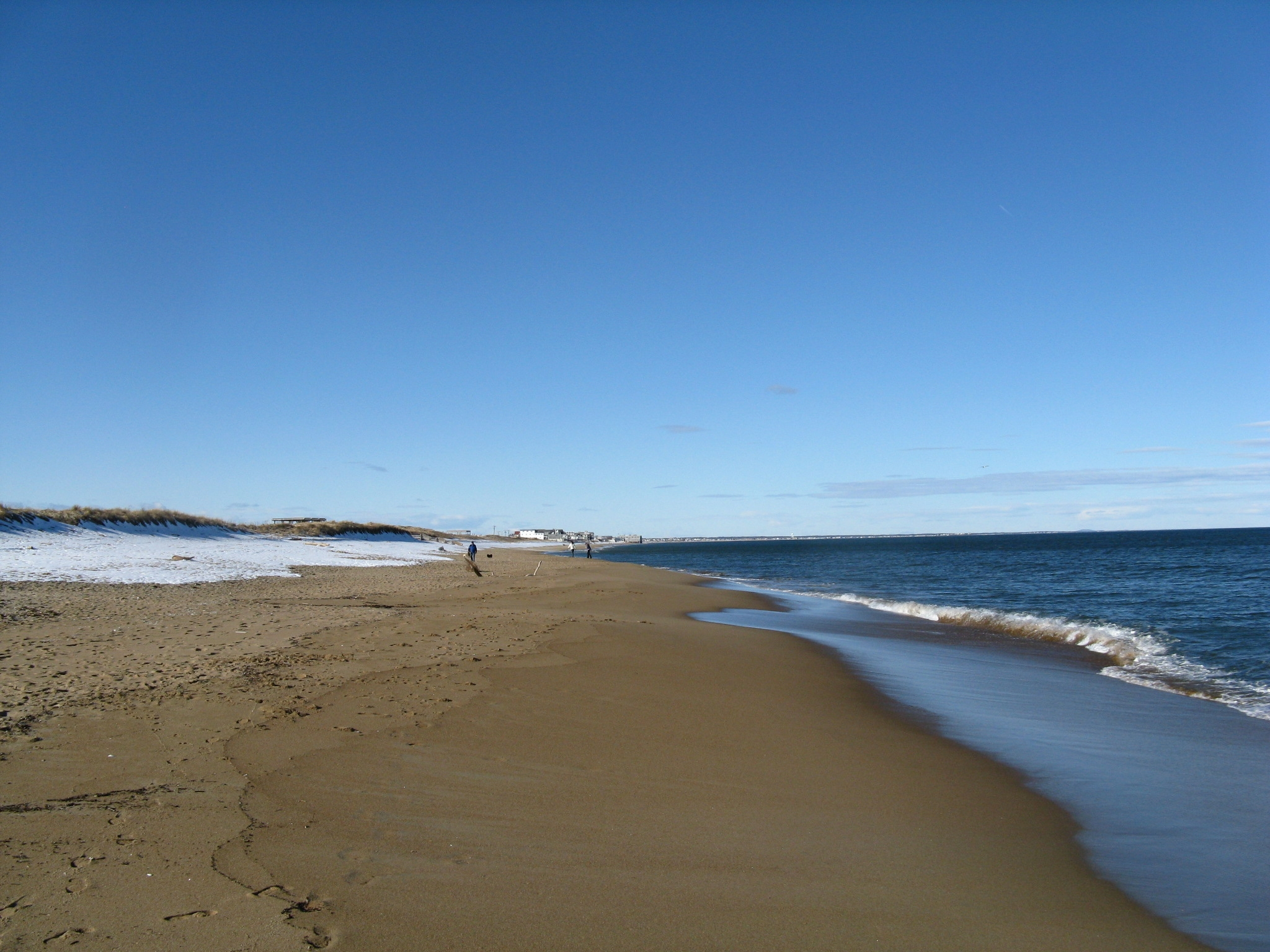

- Location within Massachusetts Location within the United States
- Location: Salisbury, Massachusetts, United States
- Coordinates: 42°49′35.4″N 70°49′2.8″W
- Area: 355 acres (144 ha)
- Elevation: 10 ft (3.0 m)
- Established: 1931
- Administrator: Massachusetts Department of Conservation and Recreation
- Website: Official website

Salisbury Beach State Reservation is a public recreation area on the Atlantic Ocean in the town of Salisbury, Massachusetts, managed by the Massachusetts Department of Conservation and Recreation. It is one of the most heavily utilized state parks in the Commonwealth, with "an annual attendance rate of over one million visitors."

== History ==
During the American Civil War the Fort at Salisbury Point was built on the site, which was eventually lost due to beach erosion. The land was acquired for use as a state park in 1931. It saw improvements in the following decade done by the Works Progress Administration and the Civilian Conservation Corps. During World War II the site included a gun battery as the Salisbury Beach Military Reservation. The reservation came under the jurisdiction of the Department of Conservation and Recreation in 1969. Continuing park improvements include the construction of a new jetty in 2015. In March 2024, coastal flooding eroded 7,500 tons of sand placed on the beach at a cost of $600,000 as part of a beachfront restoration effort by local property owners.

== Wildlife ==
Notable wildlife includes harbor seals, which are often found on Badgers Rocks in the Merrimack River in the fall and winter. Birds that can be sighted include black ducks, green-winged teal, and great blue herons, along with pectoral, solitary, and least sandpipers. "White-winged and surf scoters can be seen flying low over open water or bobbing in loose flocks among the offshore waves."

== Activities and amenities ==
The park features a 3.8-mile-long (6.1 km) beach on the Atlantic Ocean, non-swimming beaches on the Merrimack River, a 484-site campground, motorized and non-motorized boating, picnicking, playground and pavilion, fishing, and educational programs.
