= Melissa Hathaway =

Cybersecurity expert

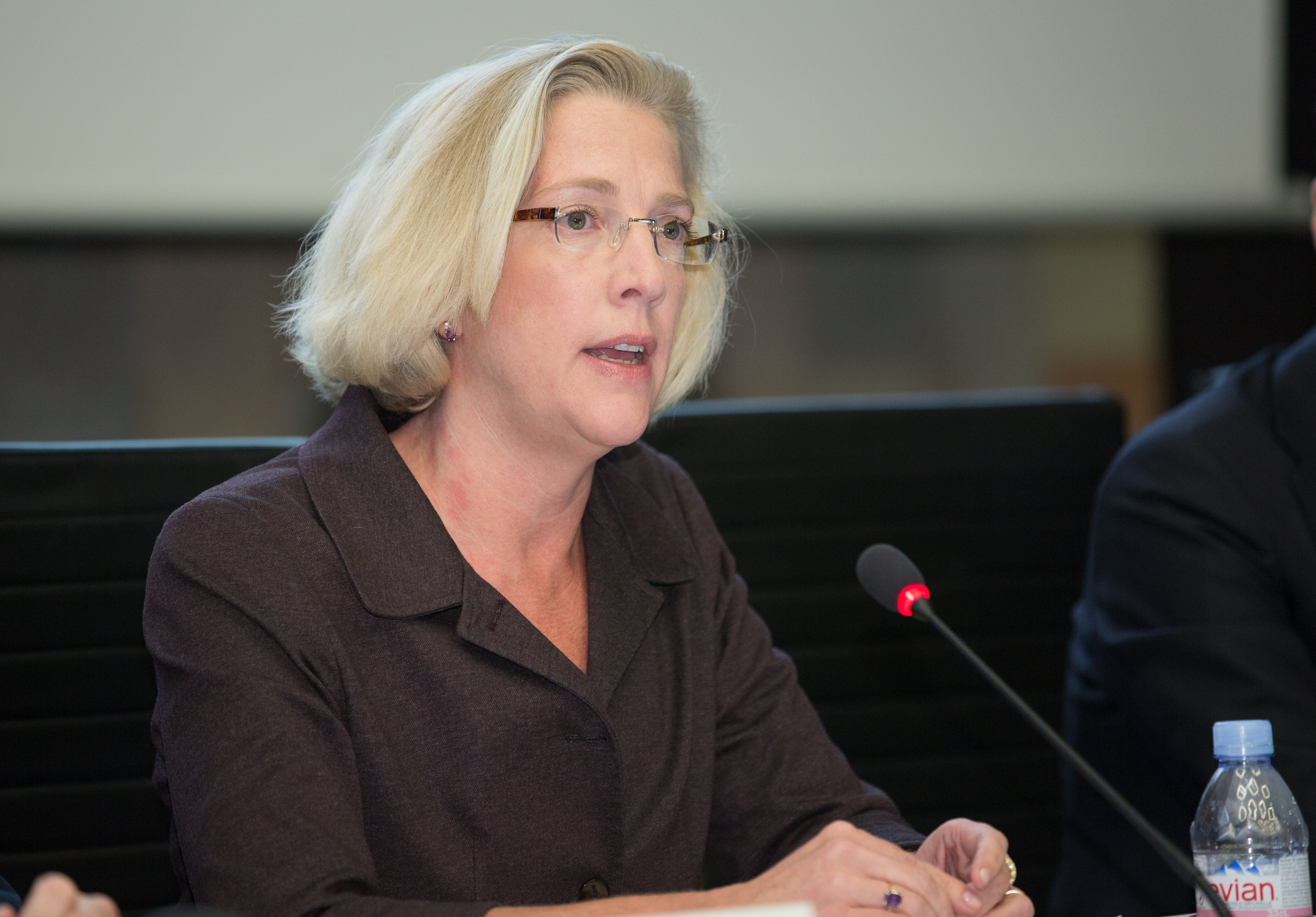
- Hathaway speaks at the World Summit on the Information Society in 2016
- Born: Melissa Ellen Hathaway; 10 November 1968 (age 57)
- Education: American University
- Occupation: Security consultant
- Employer: Hathaway Global Strategies (August 2009–Present)

Melissa Hathaway (born 10 November 1968) is a leading expert in cyberspace policy and cybersecurity. She served under two U.S. presidential administrations from 2007 to 2009, including more than 8 months at the White House, spearheading the Cyberspace Policy Review for President Barack Obama after leading the Comprehensive National Cybersecurity Initiative (CNCI) for President George W. Bush. She is President of Hathaway Global Strategies LLC, a Senior Fellow and member of the Board of Regents at Potomac Institute for Policy Studies, a Distinguished Fellow at the Centre for International Governance Innovation in Canada, and a non-resident Research Fellow at the Kosciuszko Institute in Poland. She was previously a Senior Adviser at Harvard Kennedy School's Belfer Center.

== Career ==
Hathaway received a B.A. at The American University. She graduated from the US Armed Forces Staff College with a special certificate in Information Operations.

Hathaway was employed with consulting firm Evidence Based Research. Her work included developing models for detection of cocaine movement into the United States.

From June 1993 to February 2007, Hathaway worked for consulting firm Booz Allen Hamilton, focusing on information operations and long-range strategy and policy support business units. Her work included evaluations of "new force options across the electromagnetic spectrum" and "design and development of novel techniques for mapping social, business, and process and infrastructure relationships."

Hathaway served as Senior Advisor to the Director of National Intelligence, Mike McConnell, and Cyber Coordination Executive. She chaired the National Cyber Study Group (NCSG). In her role at the NCSG, she contributed to the development of the Comprehensive National Cybersecurity Initiative (CNCI). Hathaway was appointed the Director of the Joint Interagency Cyber Task Force in January 2008.

Hathaway was named the Acting Senior Director for Cyberspace for the National Security and Homeland Security Councils on 9 February 2009, and placed in charge of a 60-day inter-agency review of the plan, programs, and activities underway throughout the government dedicated to cyber security.

In January 2009, at the request of the Assistant to the President for National Security Affairs, Ms. Hathaway was asked to lead the 60-Day Cyberspace Policy Review for President Obama. She assembled a team of experienced government cyber experts and identified over 250 recommendations. In May 2009, President Obama presented the blueprint of the Cyberspace Policy Review and announced cybersecurity would be one of his Administration's priorities. He recognized Ms. Hathaway's leadership and noted that there were, as the President said, "opportunities for everyone—academia, industry, and governments—to work together to build a trusted and resilient communications and information infrastructure".

On 3 August 2009, it was announced that Hathaway would return to the private sector, with her resignation taking effect 21 August 2009. In departing, she cited frustration over not yet having been selected for the new position of cyber coordinator, "I wasn't willing to continue to wait any longer, because I'm not empowered right now to continue to drive the change".

From 1 October 2009, till the project's conclusion in 2015, Hathaway served as a senior adviser to Project MINERVA at the Harvard Kennedy School. She is also one of the lead instructors for the executive program, Cybersecurity: The Intersection of Policy and Technology

Hathaway is president of Hathaway Global Strategies, her own consulting firm. She also serves as an advisor to companies including Cisco. She is one of thirty commissioners for the Global Commission on Internet Governance.
