= John M. Hathaway =

American politician

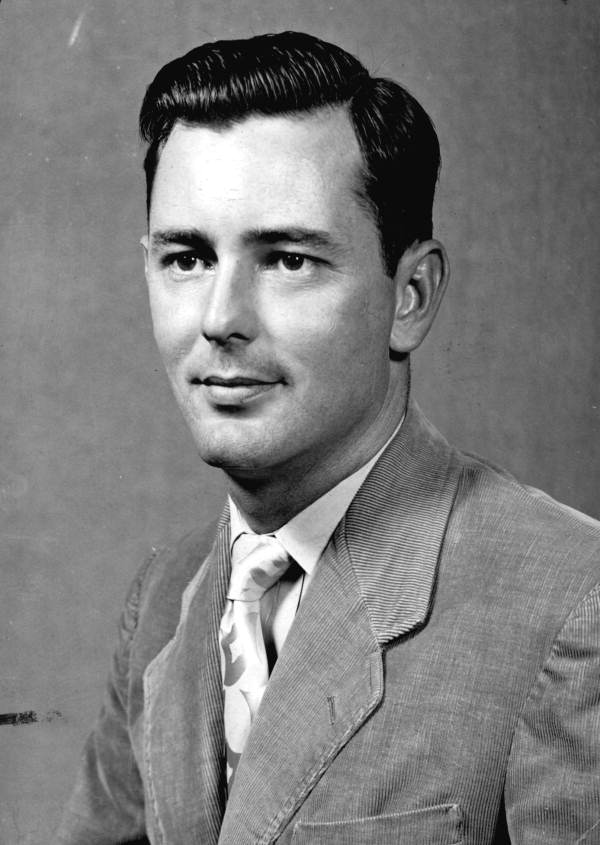
- Hathaway in 1951

Member of the Florida House of Representatives from Charlotte County
- In office 1951–1959

Personal details
- Born: July 11, 1926 San Juan, Puerto Rico
- Died: January 3, 1989 (aged 62)
- Party: Democratic

John M. Hathaway (July 11, 1926 – January 3, 1989) was an American politician. He served as a Democratic member of the Florida House of Representatives.

== Life and career ==
Hathaway was born in San Juan, Puerto Rico. He served in the United States Navy during World War II.

Hathaway served in the Florida House of Representatives from 1951 to 1959.

Hathaway died on January 3, 1989, at the age of 62.
