= Fort Miller (Massachusetts) =

Fort Miller/Fort Darby
- Naugus Head, Marblehead, Massachusetts

Site information
- Type: Coastal Defense
- Owner: private
- Controlled by: Town of Marblehead

Location
- Location in Massachusetts
- Coordinates: 42°31′12″N 70°51′43″W

Site history
- Built: circa 1629-1632
- In use: circa 1632-1900
- Demolished: circa 1900?
- Battles/wars: American Revolution; War of 1812; American Civil War

Fort Miller (originally Fort Darby or Darby's Fort) was a coastal defense fort in Marblehead, Massachusetts, in existence circa 1630–1900. Circa 1861 it was renamed for James Miller, a colonel in the War of 1812, distinguished for his actions in the Battle of Lundy's Lane. He was later Collector of the Port in nearby Salem from 1824 to 1849.

== History ==
The fort was Marblehead's first coastal fort, originally built circa 1629-1632 by colonial forces under the direction of acting Governor of Massachusetts John Endecott. It was initially named Fort Darby or Darby's Fort, allegedly after a similar head of land at Derby, Dorsetshire, England. The location was on Naugus Head at the northwest corner of Marblehead's peninsula. The fort was actually sited to defend the harbor of Salem, joined by Fort Pickering on Winter Island in 1643. The Gale's Head Fort (later Fort Sewall) was built in 1634 as Marblehead's main defense.

Fort Darby was used in the American Revolutionary War. It was subsequently repaired for the War of 1812 as a lookout post and drill area for nearby Fort Sewall. It was rebuilt as a five-gun battery and renamed Fort Miller for the Civil War. The fort had five guns, with a magazine and bomb-proof shelter on the parade, and a barracks outside the fort. An armament report by Major Charles E. Blunt dated January 31, 1865 shows the fort had two 8-inch smoothbore guns, two 24-pounder smoothbore guns, and one 32-pounder rifle. Fort Miller was garrisoned by the 11th Unattached Company of Massachusetts militia from December 1864 to June 1865. The fort served through the Spanish–American War, after which it was probably demolished.

== See also ==
- Fort Glover
- Seacoast defense in the United States
- List of coastal fortifications of the United States
- List of military installations in Massachusetts
