= John Brown Hathaway =

American politician (1809–1895)

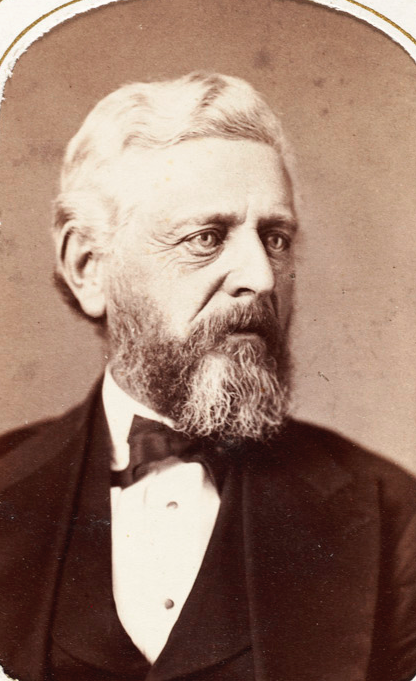
John Brown Hathaway, circa 1870

John Brown Hathaway (June 28, 1809 – 1895) was an American politician in Massachusetts. He served in the Massachusetts Senate.

Born in Rochester, Massachusetts, John and Amy née Read Hathaway were his parents.When he was six his family moved to Assonet (Freetown). When he was 11 his mother indentured him to a farmer in Berkley for five years. He became a shoemaker and worked in Assonet and then Fall River.

Hathaway worked in the grocery business and married Betsey F. Gray. A Republican, he served in the Massachusetts House of Representatives in 1866 and 1867 and the Massachusetts Senate in 1869 and 1870. He lived on the corner of Rock Street and Cherry Street. He owned property and a farm. He wintered in Florida.

In 1866 and 1867, Hathaway was a selectman of Bristol County, Massachusetts.

== See also ==
- 1869 Massachusetts legislature
- 1870 Massachusetts legislature
