= 1870 Massachusetts legislature =

91st Massachusetts General Court
←	90th	92nd	→

Overview
- Legislative body: General Court
- Election: November 2, 1869

Senate
- Members: 40
- President: Horace H. Coolidge
- Party control: Republican (29 R, 10 D, 1 other)

House
- Members: 240
- Speaker: Harvey Jewell
- Party control: Republican (160 R, 58 D, 22 other)

Sessions
- 1st: January 5, 1870 – June 23, 1870

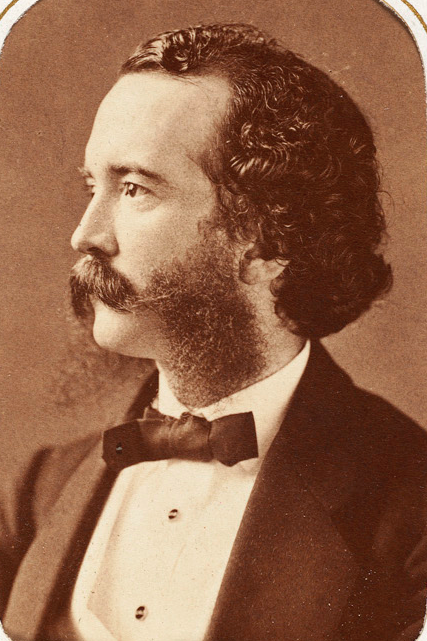
Horace Coolidge, Senate president.

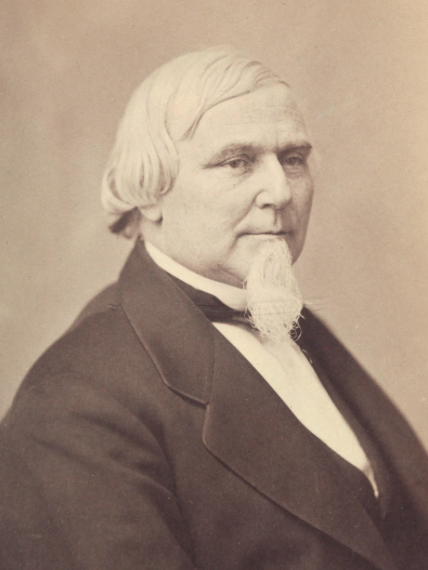
Harvey Jewell, House speaker.

Leaders of the Massachusetts General Court, 1870.

The 91st Massachusetts General Court, consisting of the Massachusetts Senate and the Massachusetts House of Representatives, met in 1870 during the governorship of Republican William Claflin. Horace H. Coolidge served as president of the Senate and Harvey Jewell served as speaker of the House.

== Senators ==
Image	Name	Date of birth	District	Party
	Nathaniel Ellis Atwood	September 13, 1807		
	Jacob Bates	1819		
	Joseph Augustus Benjamin	1817		
	George Marshall Buttrick	1822		
	Andrew Jackson Clark	1835		
	Benjamin Franklin Clark	1808		
	Waldo Colburn	November 13, 1824		
	Patrick Andrew Collins	March 12, 1844		
	Horace Hopkins Coolidge	February 11, 1832		
	Stephen Moody Crosby	1827		
	Edmund Dowse	1813		
	John Fletcher	1827		
	James Augustus Fox	August 11, 1827		
	Alonzo Madison Giles	1821		
	Henry Clay Greeley	1830		
	John Brown Hathaway	1809		
	John Alexander Hawes	1823		
	Francis Allen Hobart	1833		
	Nathaniel Jay Holden	1827		
	Joseph Sidney Howe	1832		
	Willard Woodman Jenness	1827		
	George William Johnson	1827		
	William Wallace Kellogg	1824		
	George Augustus King	1834		
	Charles James Kittredge	1818		
	Charles Rensselaer Ladd	April 9, 1822		
	James Henry Leland	1833		
	George Harris Monroe	1826		
	Ellis Wesley Morton	1840		
	James Pierce	1837		
	Joseph Greeley Pollard	1833		
	Jeremiah Hobbs Pote	1820		
	Stephen Holbrook Rhodes	November 7, 1825		
	George Merrick Rice	November 20, 1808		
	James Granville Sproat	1835		
	Orlando Barnard Tenney	1816		
	Francis Thompson	1826		
	William W. Warren	February 27, 1834		
	Charles Augustus Wheelock	1812		
	Frederick H. Willcomb	1831		

== Representatives ==
- John A. P. Allen
- William H. Ames
- Benjamin F. Angell
- John Armitage
- William F. Arnold
- Jonathan Arnold, Jr
- Samuel Atherton
- John Ayars, Jr
- George H. Babbitt, Jr
- Jesse Bacon
- Amasa W. Bailey
- Joseph K. Baker, Jr
- Dana Bancroft
- Henry J. Barker
- William Barker, Jr
- John Barlow
- Daniel N. Barrett
- Patrick Barry
- William Bartlett
- Carlos Batchelder
- Eliakim A. Bates
- Thomas Bean
- Alanson W. Beard
- Wesley K. Bell
- Daniel W. Bemis
- Edward L. Bigelow
- John W. Blaney
- Robert Bower
- Selwin Z. Bowman
- Benjamin H. Brown
- Samuel W. Brown
- Ezra P. Brownell
- George L. Buffin
- Elias Bullard
- John R. Bullard
- John D. Burtch
- Hodgdon F. Buzzell
- Michael Carney
- James E. Carpenter
- Solomon Carter
- Albert Chamberlin
- Alexander H. Champlin
- William M. Child
- Elijah H. Chisholm
- Horace Choate
- Samuel A. Churchill
- Edward Clarke
- William Cogswell
- George J. L. Colby
- Justin M. Cooley
- George P. Cox
- Alanson Crittenden
- S. Frank Crockett
- William H. Cundy
- Marshall N. Cutter
- Samuel R. Damon
- George K. Daniell
- Robert S. Daniels
- William F. Darby
- Curtis Davis
- Elisha Davis
- John H. Davis
- Timothy Davis
- John A. Day
- Franklin Derby
- David S. Draper
- Jeremiah J. Driscoll
- John Drynan
- Thomas Earle
- Richard Eddy
- Francis Edson
- Pliny Edson
- James H. Ellis
- George O. Fairbanks
- James O. Fallon
- Lewis M. Ferry
- Adams Fiske
- John E. Fitzgerald
- Hugh Flood
- Reuben P. Folger
- Benjamin Franklin
- Rodney French
- Daniel Gale
- Samuel Galley
- Thomas J. Gargan
- Thomas Gates
- Jubal C. Gleason
- Dorrance S. Goddard
- Henry A. Goodrich
- John B. Goodrich
- Henry Goodspeed
- Charles J. Goodwin
- Dennis J. Gorman
- George H. Goward
- William T. Grammer
- Thomas B. Griffith
- Lucas W. Hannum
- James L. Harriman
- Daniel L. Harris
- Thomas B. Harris
- Abraham G. Hart
- Andrew L. Haskell
- Guilford Hathaway
- Bainbridge Hayward
- James A. Hervey
- Orrin Hewes
- Luther Hill
- Noble H. Hill
- Sylvester S. Hill
- Larone Hills
- Thomas Holway
- James Horswell
- Samuel Horton
- Charles H. Hovey
- Jonas E. Howe
- Theodore C. Hurd
- Thomas P. Hurlbut
- Francis James
- James W. Jenkins
- Thomas L. Jenks
- Harvey Jewell
- Sylvester Jewett
- Abbott Johnson
- Joseph P. Johnson
- Robert Johnson
- Ensign H. Kellogg
- Shubael B. Kelly
- Warren Kent
- David Lane
- Joseph C. Lewis
- Albert W. Lincoln
- George W. Lobdell
- Caleb Lombard
- Henry A. Lord
- Charles H. Loring
- Hugh A. Madden
- Frederick A. Mann
- Henry Mann
- Edwin T. Marble
- Warren Marchant
- William Marchant
- Charles N. Marsh
- J. Wesley Marshall
- George H. Martin
- Edward T. Marvel
- John W. Mayhew
- Edward F. Mayo
- Edward McDonald
- Moses W. McIntire
- John W. McKim
- Charles J. Mclntire
- Cornelius McMahon
- William H. Mears
- Charles H. Merriam
- Moody Merrill
- William Merrill
- Benjamin F. Mills
- Horatio Moore
- John Harvey Moore
- John M. Moore
- Luther G. Morrison
- Bushrod Morse
- James R. Morse
- Newton Morse
- Henry P. Moulton
- Henry J. Nazro
- Peter M. Neal
- Joseph Newmarch
- George Nowell
- Francis A. Nye
- Benjamin F. Packard
- Charles H. Page
- Samuel S. Paine
- George A. Parker
- William H. Parker
- Dexter Parks
- Lloyd Parsons
- Luke Perkins
- William A. Pew
- Samuel H. Pierce
- Samuel Pierce
- George T. Plunkett
- Ira G. Potter
- David Powers
- Henry A. Pratt
- George Putnam
- Noah Rankin
- John Rhodes
- Thomas Rice
- John H. Roberts
- George Lewis Ruffin
- Joseph M. Russell
- George Sanford
- Samuel D. Sawin
- Henry H. Shaw
- A. A. Sherman
- John Sias
- Ansel C. Smith
- Hambleton E. Smith
- Walter Spooner
- L. Miles Standish
- Levi Stockbridge
- Patrick Sweeney
- Theodore H. Sweetser
- John K. Tarbox
- Edmund B. Taylor
- Edward Taylor
- Levi Z. Thomas
- Dexter A. Tompkins
- Charles R. Train
- Benjamin A. Tripp
- Samuel C. Trull
- Edward Tuck
- Samuel J. Tuttle
- Stephen Wallace
- James J. Walworth
- Zenas C. Wardwell
- Henry A. Warriner
- Andrew J. Waterman
- Lory S. Watson
- Nathan H. Webb
- John D. Weld
- Michael F. Wells
- Alonzo B. Wentworth
- John W. Wetherell
- Sydney F. Whitehouse
- Harrison C. Whitmore
- Daniel H. Whitney
- Emerson Wight
- Charles C. Wilbar
- Alfred M. Williams
- Lester Williams
- Samuel S. Willson
- William Winn
- Timothy D. Wood
- Charles L. Woodbury
- William L. Woodcock
- David T. Woodwell
- William H. Wormstead
- Gardner C. Wright
- George T. Wyer

== See also ==
- 41st United States Congress
- List of Massachusetts General Courts
