= Anthony Hathaway =

American bank robber

- Born: Anthony Leonard Hathaway
- Other names: Cyborg Bandit, Elephant Man Bandit
- Convictions: First-degree robbery (four counts); Felony theft

Details
- Country: United States
- State: Washington

Anthony Hathaway is a convicted American bank robber who reportedly robbed as many as thirty banks in Washington State between 2013 and 2014 to pay for his drug addiction. He is featured in the 2021 Apple TV+ podcast Hooked.

== Career ==
Hathaway began working for Boeing as a technical designer in 1990 at age 21.

In 2005, Hathaway injured his back in the Boeing parking lot during a game of hockey with friends. He was prescribed the pain medication OxyContin after surgery for a ruptured disk in his back. Subsequently, he became addicted to opioids and later heroin.

== Bank robberies ==
After losing his job, Hathaway began robbing banks to support his heroin addiction. He robbed banks in the Seattle metropolitan area, including Kirkland, Bellevue, the University District, Mukilteo, Lynnwood, and Everett. During the crimes Hathaway generally wore a mask and gloves. At first, he wore textured metallic fabric over his face and was nicknamed the "Cyborg Bandit" because the disguise was similar to that of cyborgs in science fiction productions. The disguise received media attention, so Hathaway covered his head with a shirt and cut out two eye holes, which resulted in the nickname "Elephant Man Bandit," because he looked similar to the character in the movie The Elephant Man, based on Joseph Merrick, a man who draped cloth over his disfigured face.

On February 4, 2014, after a robbery at a US Bank located inside a Fred Meyer supermarket in Lynnwood, Washington, Hathaway's getaway vehicle was caught on surveillance. The camera showed a light blue minivan with a Seattle Seahawks football decal on the back window and an after-market exterior mirror driving away. The total money taken during Hathaway's robberies was $73,628.

Hathaway admitted to thirty bank robberies between February 2013 and February 2014. On December 23, 2015, Hathaway pled guilty to four counts of first-degree robbery and one count of felony theft. On January 15, 2016, Hathaway was sentenced to nine years in prison and was ordered to repay all of the money stolen. He also received a lifetime ban from all of the banks he robbed.

In 2021, Apple TV+ released a podcasted titled Hooked, which is an adaptation of an article written by journalist Josh Dean for Bloomberg Businessweek titled "Hooked: America’s Busiest Bank Robber." Dean hosts the podcast, which features interviews with Tony, his family members, and his friends.
