= Unattached Companies Massachusetts Volunteer Militia =

The Unattached Companies of Massachusetts Volunteer Militia were units of infantry raised for the defenses of the eastern coast of Massachusetts during the American Civil War. Twenty-six companies were mustered into the Union Army during 1864-1865, several of them reorganizing for additional terms of service.

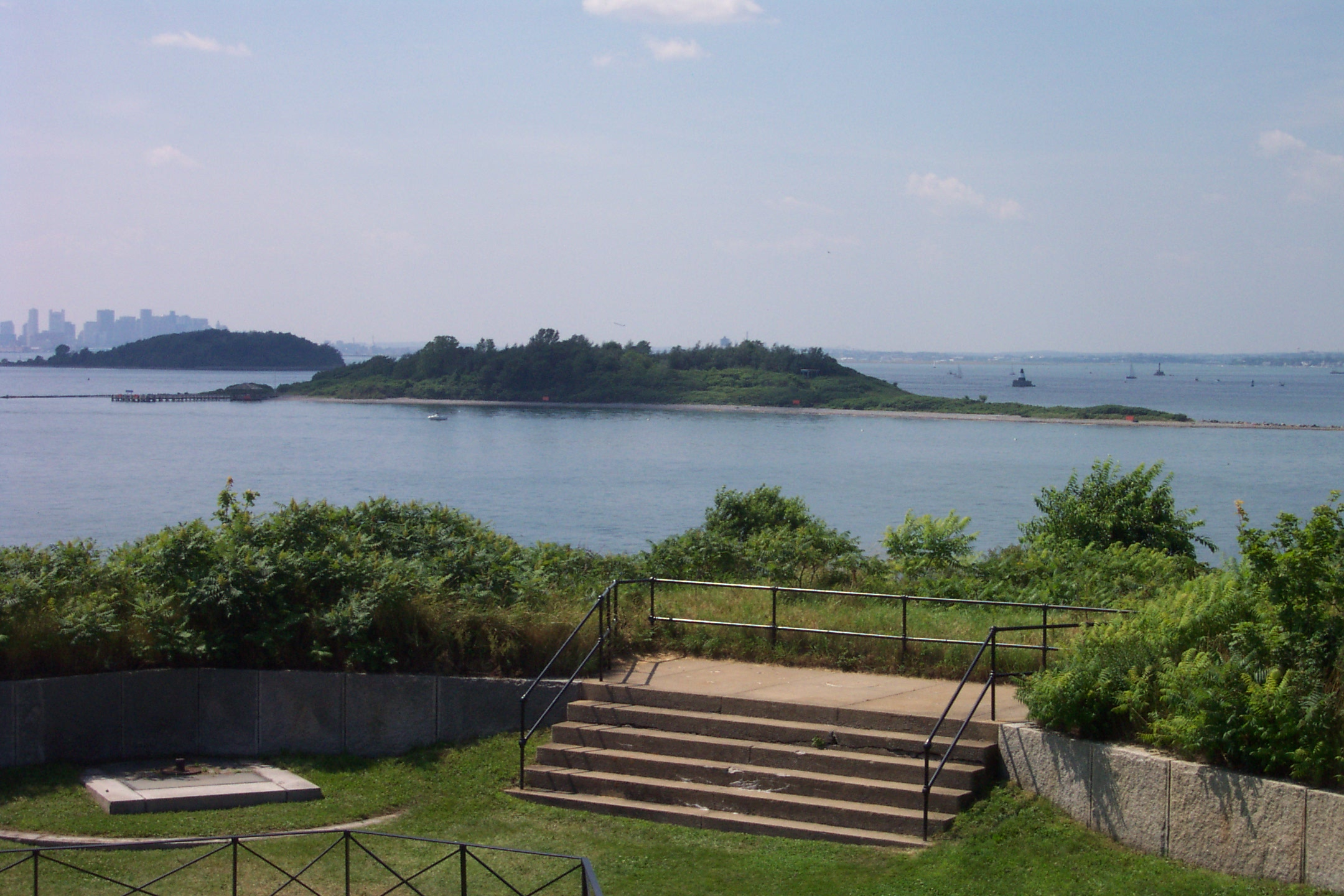
Gallops Island (center) as viewed from Fort Warren, two posts garrisoned by the Unattached Companies

== History ==
Beginning in April 1864, companies of infantry were needed for guard and garrison duty along the coast of Massachusetts; to be stationed at the numerous military posts located there for a ninety-day period. With the Independent Division of Militia, a home guard militia organization, already established in the state in 1863, eight companies were recruited from their ranks, and mustered into United States service. Five other companies were detached from existing regiments of the Massachusetts Militia to finish the required roster.

Their term of enlistment soon ending, a call for 100-day companies was then ordered in July and August 1864 to fill the soon to be vacant positions at the coastal forts. Again, the state militia regiments were used to fill most of the quota, with a need to only recruit two new companies.

In late October 1864, the office of the Adjutant General released orders to the commanding officers of the "Companies of One Hundred Days Troops belonging to Massachusetts, now doing garrison duty at the forts on the coast", to reenlist their commands for one year, and to fill with new recruits any positions held by those men not choosing to rejoin. Six of the 100-day companies were re-mustered, including the 2nd Unattached Company now beginning its third term. None of the one-year companies finished a full term, as the war had come to an end, and all were mustered out by July 1865.

== Unattached Companies ==
Co	Service	Off	Enl	Died	Muster in	Muster out	Post	ref
1st	90 day	3	97	0	29 Apr 1864	1 Aug 1864	Fort Independence, Boston	
2nd	90 day	3	88	0	3 May 1864	6 Aug 1864	Eastern Point Fort/Gloucester	
2nd	100 day	3	98	0	7 Aug 1864	15 Nov 1864	Gloucester/Gallops Island	
2nd	1 year	3	99	3	16 Nov 1864	7 Jul 1865	Eastern Point Fort/Gallops Island	
3rd	90 day	3	84	0	3 May 1864	5 Aug 1864	Fort Pickering, Salem	
4th	90 day	3	98	0	3 May 1864	6 Aug 1864	Fort at Clark's Point, New Bedford	
5th	90 day	3	98	0	4 May 1864	2 Aug 1864	Beech St Barracks, Boston	
6th	90 day	3	80	0	4 May 1864	2 Aug 1864	Camp Meigs, Readville	
7th	90 day	3	98	1	4 May 1864	5 Aug 1864	Gallops Island	
8th	90 day	3	94	0	May 1864	10 Aug 1864	Gallops Island	
9th	90 day	3	97	0	10 May 1864	11 Aug 1864	Gallops Island	
10th	90 day	3	98	0	10 May 1864	8 Aug 1864	Fort Warren, Boston Harbor	
11th	90 day	3	92	0	16 May 1864	15 Aug 1864	Fort Sewall, Marblehead; Eastern Point Fort, Gloucester	
12th	90 day	3	98	0	16 May 1864	15 Aug 1864	Long Point, Provincetown	
13th	90 day	3	89	0	16 May 1864	15 Aug 1864	Fort at Clark's Point, New Bedford	
15th	100 day	3	88	0	29 Jul 1864	15 Nov 1864	Fort Warren	
16th	100 day	3	83	0	6 Aug 1864	14 Nov 1864	Gallops Island	
17th	100 day	3	98	0	5 Aug 1864	12 Nov 1864	Fort Pickering	
17th	1 year	3	98	0	13 Nov 1864	30 June 1865	Fort Pickering	
18th	100 day	3	81	0	6 Aug 1864	14 Nov 1864	Gallops Island/Camp Meigs, Readville	
18th	1 year	3	98	1	6-7 Dec 1864	12 May 1865	Camp Meigs, Readville	
19th	100 day	3	80	0	9 Aug 1864	16 Nov 1864	Fort Warren	
19th	1 year	3	98	0	25 Nov 1864	27 Jun 1865	Fort Warren, Fort Winthrop	
20th	100 day	3	87	0	11 Aug 1864	18 Nov 1864	Fort Sewall, Marblehead	
20th	1 year	3	98	0	19 Nov 1864	29 Jun 1865	Fort at Salisbury Point	
21st	100 day	3	97	0	11 Aug 1864	18 Nov 1864	Long Point, Provincetown	
21st	1 year	3	97	1	23 Nov 1864	28 Jun 1865	Provincetown	
22nd	100 day	3	85	0	18 Aug 1864	25 Nov 1864	Camp Meigs, Readville	
23rd	100 day	3	98	0	18 Aug 1864	26 Nov 1864	Camp Meigs, Readville	
24th	1 year	3	98	0	16-22 Dec 1864	12 May 1865	Camp Meigs, Readville	
25th	1 year	3	98	0	9 Dec 1864	29 Jun 1865	Fort Miller, Marblehead	
26th	1 year	4	98	0	13 Dec 1864	12 May 1865	Camp Meigs, Readville	
27th	1 year	3	98	2	30 Dec 1864-9 Jan 1865	30 Jun 1865	Fort Standish, Plymouth	

- No 14th Unattached Company was mentioned by Higginson, Bowen or Adjutant General records. The 90-day companies numbered 13, and the 100-day ones started with #15, the reenlisting 2nd Unattached numerically the 14th.

=== Massachusetts Volunteer Militia ===
Many of the new Unattached Companies were organized from companies previously in, or detached from, regiments of volunteer militia infantry units in Federal service from Massachusetts. They included:
3rd Regiment Massachusetts Volunteer Militia
Co A = 22nd Unatt., Co E = 15th Unatt., Co H = 18th Unatt., Co I = 23rd Unatt.
4th Regiment Massachusetts Volunteer Militia
Co E = 20th Unatt.
6th Regiment Massachusetts Volunteer Militia
Co I = 8th Unatt.
7th Regiment Massachusetts Volunteer Militia
Co K = 17th Unatt.
8th Regiment Massachusetts Volunteer Militia
Co C = 27th Unatt., Co E = 2nd Unatt., Co I = 11th Unatt.
42nd Massachusetts Volunteer Infantry Regiment
Co G = 7th Unatt.
50th Massachusetts Infantry Regiment
Co A = 13th Unatt.

== See also ==
- List of Massachusetts Civil War Units
- Massachusetts in the American Civil War
