= James Hathaway =

James Hathaway may refer to:

- Sergeant Hathaway, a character in Lewis, a British TV series
- James C. Hathaway (born 1956), Canadian-American scholar, authority on refugee law
- James Shelton Hathaway (1859–1930) American educator, and academic administrator
