= Salisbury, Massachusetts =

Town in Massachusetts, United States

- Town
- Salisbury Beach in 2026

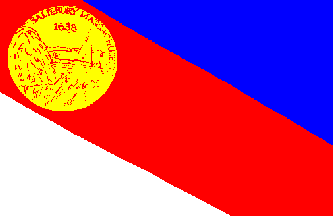
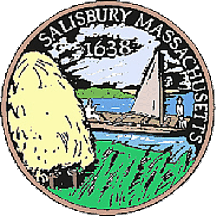
- Flag Seal

- Location in Essex County and Massachusetts
- Coordinates: 42°50′30″N 70°51′40″W
- Country: United States
- State: Massachusetts
- County: Essex
- Settled: 1638
- Incorporated: 1639

Government
  - Type: Open town meeting

Area
  - Total: 17.8 sq mi (46.2 km^{2})
  - Land: 15.4 sq mi (40.0 km^{2})
  - Water: 2.4 sq mi (6.2 km^{2})
- Elevation: 26 ft (8 m)

Population (2020)
  - Total: 9,236
  - Density: 598/sq mi (231/km^{2})
- Time zone: UTC−5 (Eastern)
  - Summer (DST): UTC−4 (Eastern)
- ZIP Code: 01952
- Area code: 351/978
- FIPS code: 25-59245
- GNIS feature ID: 0618310
- Website: www.salisburyma.gov

Salisbury is a small coastal beach town and summer tourist destination in Essex County, Massachusetts, United States. The community is a popular summer resort beach town situated on the Atlantic Ocean, north of Boston on the New Hampshire border. It is home to the new Salisbury Beach Boardwalk, full of souvenir shops, restaurants, cafes, arcades and panoramic views of the Atlantic Ocean. The population was 9,236 at the 2020 census. Parts of town comprise the census-designated place of Salisbury.

== History ==
=== Pre-Colonial Era ===
The area currently known as Salisbury was inhabited for tens of thousands of years prior to European colonization. At the Morrill Point burial mound site on the north shore of the Merrimack River, there are human remains dating to 7,000 years ago with some dating suggesting settlement there as early as 8,500 years ago.

At the time of European contact and colonization, the area north of the Merrimack River was inhabited by the Pentucket Tribe of the Pennacook confederation, who lived at the coastline seasonally to fish in the coastal wetlands. Unlike other towns of what would become Essex County that negotiated the terms of European settlement with native inhabitants, Salisbury was settled under the jurisdiction of a land grant from the Massachusetts Bay Colony General Court and laid out in a compact defensive arrangement with a garrison house, night watch, and militia for the purpose of defending against native attack.

=== Colonial Era ===
Salisbury was colonized by the English in 1638 as Colchester, and incorporated in 1640 as Salisbury, after Salisbury in Wiltshire, England, the birthplace of Christopher Batt who was appointed to train the colonists' militia. The original settlement was laid out in a compact semicircle, which allowed the residents to quickly reach the garrison house, out of a fear of attack by surrounding native peoples. Those roads still exist, though the shape today is triangular, being bounded by Elm Street, School Street and Bridge Road. A second threat came from eastern wolves, which were plentiful, and which killed the livestock and dug in the graveyard.

Salisbury was one of the six towns originally incorporated into Old Norfolk County. However in 1679, when four of those towns were broken off to form the Province of New Hampshire, Salisbury was annexed by Essex County.

The original residents, including Richard Currier, were given one small house lot near the center of town, and one larger planting lot just outside the center for farming. Families also owned large sections of "sweepage lots" near the beach, where apparently they harvested the salt marsh hay. At the time, the area was almost entirely unbroken virgin forest, which had to be cleared for the construction of houses and the planting of fields.

Richard Currier was a millwright and was one of the original settlers of Salisbury. He is listed in the first division of house lots in 1640 and received additional land in 1641 and 1642. In 1654 there were sixty commoners in Salisbury and they voted that thirty families were to be chosen to move west of the Powwow River. Eighteen of these families were commoners and the number of commoners were increased to 26 by the time Salisbury New Town became the town of Amesbury in 1668. Richard heads the list of the eighteen commoners and was one of the signers to the Articles of Agreement between the inhabitants of the Old Town and those of the New Town, 1 May 1654.

=== Resort Era ===
In 1866, Beach Road was constructed across Great Marsh, providing access to the town's five miles (8 km) of pristine beach. It developed into a thriving summer resort, lined with hotels, restaurants, shops, cottages, arcades and amusement parks. A carousel called The Flying Horses, hand carved by Charles I. D. Looff, was installed in 1914. John Miller built The Sky Rocket, the beach's first roller coaster. A Dodgem ride, originally built by Max and Harold Stoeher of Methuen, operated at Salisbury Beach in one form or another from 1920 to 1980. Major entertainers provided concerts, including Glenn Miller, Ella Fitzgerald, Louis Armstrong, Frank Sinatra and Liberace.

The resort remained vibrant through the 1960s, then gradually faded. WildCat, the last roller coaster, was razed in 1976. Pirate's Fun Park, the last small amusement park, closed in 2004 to be replaced with condominiums.

Due to climate change, Salisbury's coastline has begun rapidly eroding. In March of 2024, several beachfront residents had paid $565,000 for artificial sand dunes as protection for the beachfront houses, only for it to be washed away within three days following a severe storm.

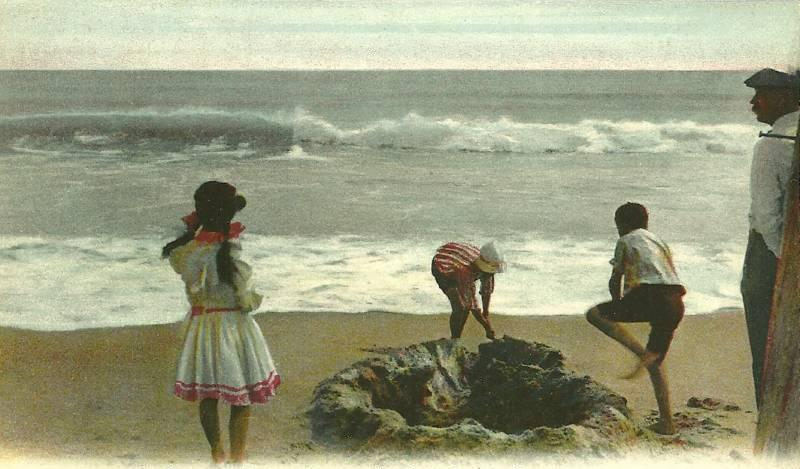
Salisbury Beach c. 1906

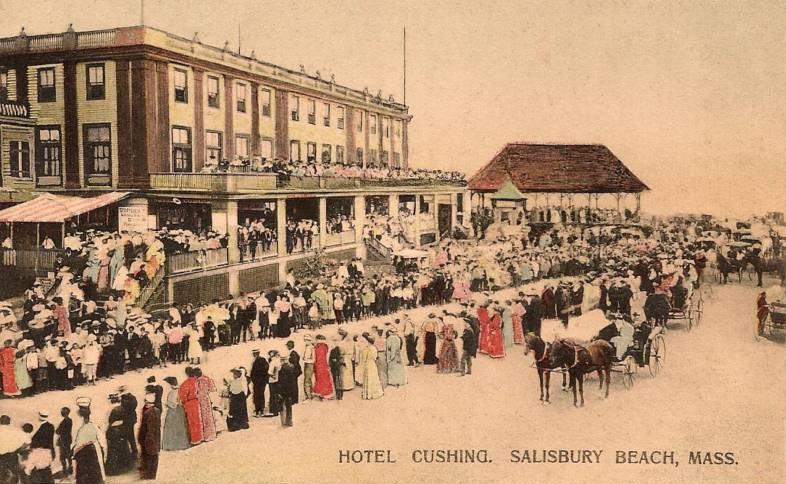
Hotel Cushing c. 1905

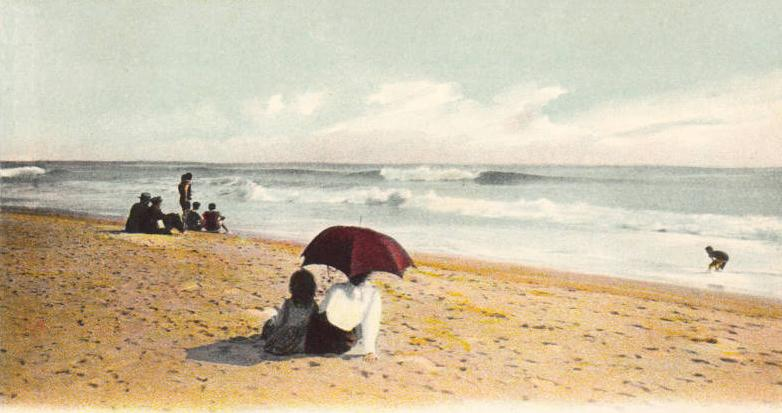
The surf in 1906

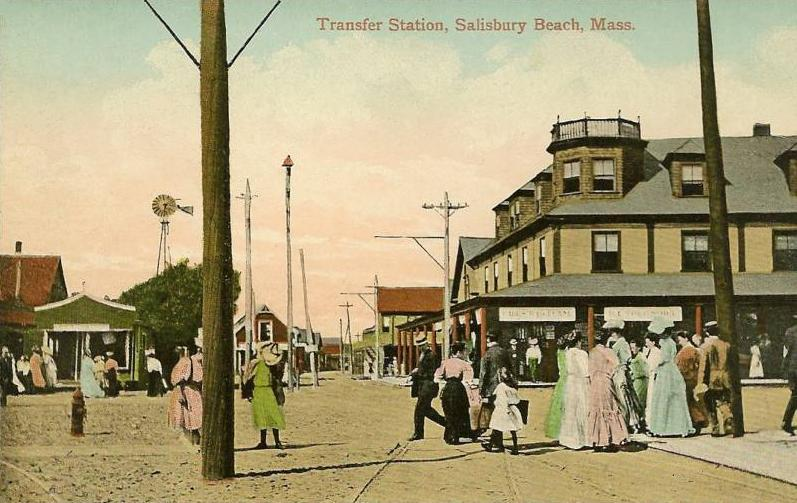
Transfer Station c. 1914

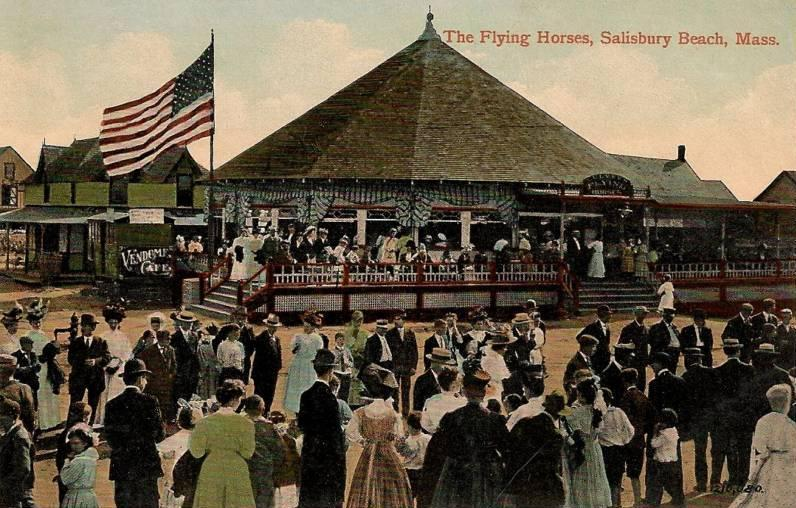
The Flying Horses c. 1914

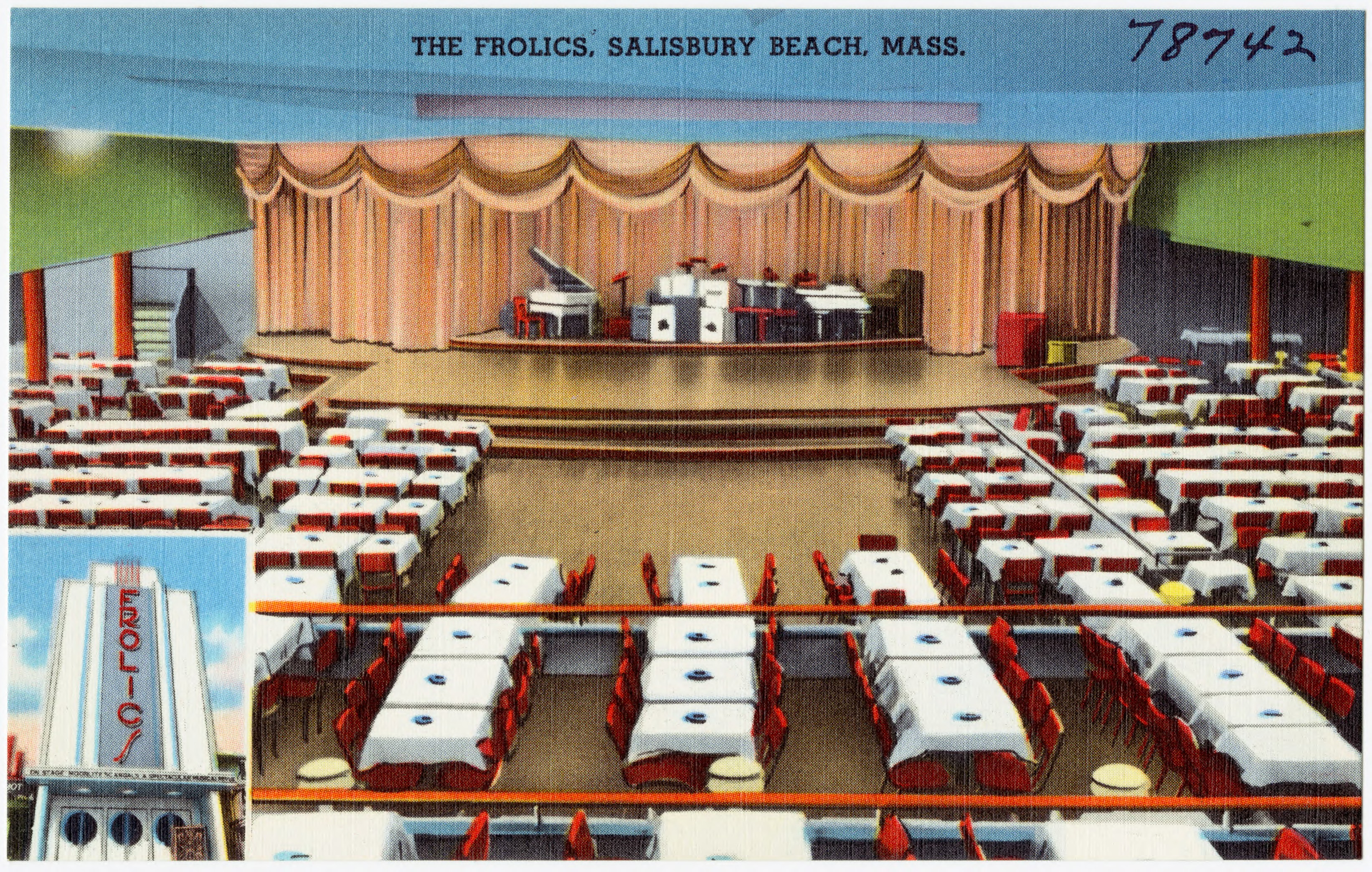
The Frolics, Salisbury Beach, Mass.

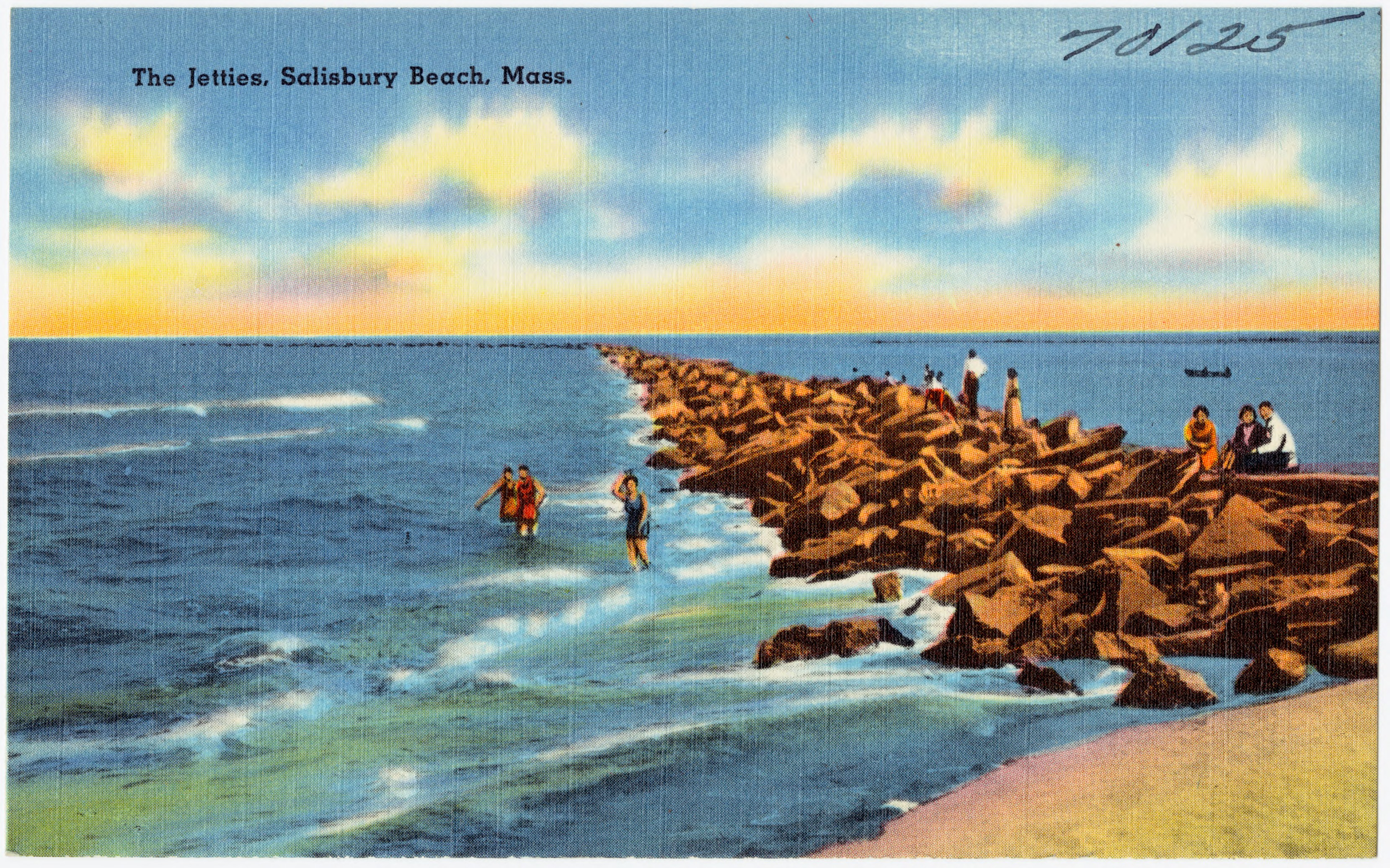
The jetties, Salisbury Beach

== Geography ==
According to the United States Census Bureau, the town has a total area of 17.9 square miles (46.2 km^{2}), of which 15.4 square miles (40.0 km^{2}) is land and 2.4 square miles (6.2 km^{2}; 13.50%) is water. Salisbury is the northernmost town in Massachusetts, with its northwestern corner (where Elmwood Street meets the New Hampshire border) being at approximately 42°53'12.26". Lying along the northern banks of the Merrimack River at its mouth, the town is bordered by the Atlantic Ocean to the east, the Merrimack River and Newburyport to the south, Amesbury to the west, and Seabrook, New Hampshire, to the north. The town is home to Salisbury Beach State Reservation, a park which includes the entire seacoast and a small portion inland, as well as the Ram Island and Carr Island State Wildlife Management Areas, the two islands lying in the middle of the Merrimack (along with Eagle Island, which is not protected). Much of the town is covered by marshes, especially in the eastern part of town. Several brooks and creeks run through town as well. The town contains three villages, Salisbury Beach, Salisbury Plains (in the northwestern corner of town) and Browns Point (between Salisbury Beach and the center of town).

== Education ==
Salisbury has one public school, Salisbury Elementary School. Middle school students attend Triton Regional Middle School, and high school students attend Triton Regional High School, along with students from Newbury and Rowley.

== Transportation ==
The town lies along the northern end of U.S. Route 1 in Massachusetts. It enters the town via the Newburyport Turnpike Bridge and heads in a roughly S-shaped route through the center of town to the New Hampshire border. Prior to the erection of the bridge, the road south of the town center was east of its current location, leading along Ferry Road to a ferry landing, which connected the town to Newburyport. The town also constitutes the northern termini of Interstate 95 in Massachusetts, and of Interstate 495, which lies just one-quarter mile into the town at I-95 Exit 59. Exit 60 gives access to both Route 1 and Massachusetts/New Hampshire Route 286, which provides access to the beaches. The eastern terminus of Massachusetts Route 110 is in Salisbury (at Route 1), and accesses I-95 at Exit 58, just over the Amesbury town line. The northernmost segment of Massachusetts Route 1A passes through town, entering concurrently with Route 1 before heading east from the town center and turning north along Salisbury Beach to join New Hampshire Route 1A.

The Merrimack Valley Regional Transit Authority provides local bus service connecting Salisbury to nearby communities. The nearest train station is in Newburyport.

== Demographics ==
Historical population
Year	Pop.	±%
1790	1,780	—
1800	1,855	+4.2%
1810	2,047	+10.4%
1820	2,006	−2.0%
1830	2,519	+25.6%
1840	2,739	+8.7%
1850	3,100	+13.2%
1860	3,310	+6.8%
1870	3,776	+14.1%
1880	4,079	+8.0%
1890	1,316	−67.7%
1900	1,558	+18.4%
1910	1,658	+6.4%
1920	1,701	+2.6%
1930	2,194	+29.0%
1940	2,376	+8.3%
1950	2,695	+13.4%
1960	3,154	+17.0%
1970	4,179	+32.5%
1980	5,973	+42.9%
1990	6,882	+15.2%
2000	7,827	+13.7%
2010	8,283	+5.8%
2020	9,236	+11.5%
2022*	9,189	−0.5%
* = population estimate. Source: United States census records and Population Estimates Program data.

As of the census of 2000, there were 7,827 people, 3,082 households, and 1,990 families residing in the town. The population density was 507.1 inhabitants per square mile (195.8/km^{2}). There were 4,156 housing units at an average density of 104.0 persons/km^{2} (269.3 persons/sq mi). The racial makeup of the town was 97.55% White, 0.41% African American, 0.31% Native American, 0.34% Asian, 0.09% Pacific Islander, 0.26% from other races, 1.05% from two or more races, and 1.18% was Hispanic or Latino of any race.

There were 3,082 households, out of which 29.5% had children under the age of 18 living with them, 49.2% were married couples living together, 10.9% have a woman whose husband does not live with her, and 35.4% were non-families. Of all households, 26.6% were made up of individuals, and 9.3% had someone living alone who was 65 years of age or older. The average household size was 2.53 and the average family size was 3.10.

In the town, the age distribution of the population shows 23.6% under the age of 18, 6.4% from 18 to 24, 32.1% from 25 to 44, 26.1% from 45 to 64, and 11.9% who were 65 years of age or older. The median age was 39 years. For every 100 females, there were 97.5 males. For every 100 females age 18 and over, there were 95.5 males.

The median income for a household in the town was $49,310, and the median income for a family was $56,327. Males had a median income of $41,705 versus $31,250 for females. The per capita income for the town was $21,608; 6.8% of the population and 4.5% of families were below the poverty line. Out of the total people living in poverty, 9.6% are under the age of 18 and 5.6% are 65 or older.

== Government ==
Salisbury is part of the Massachusetts Senate's 1st Essex district.

== Points of interest ==
- Salisbury Beach Boardwalk
- Allen Rock
- Ann's Diner
- Badgers Rock
- Blue Ocean Music Hall
- Joe's Playland
- Rings Island
- Salisbury Beach State Reservation
- Hideaway Pub

East Salisbury one room School House of 1882

== Photos ==
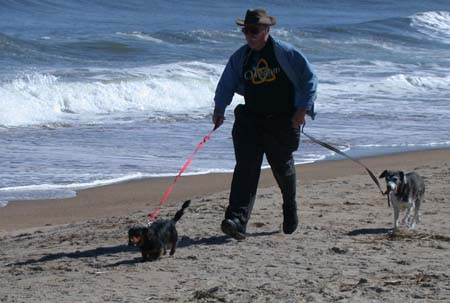
On a windy September beach

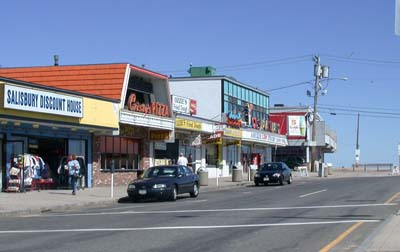
View of the center looking towards beach

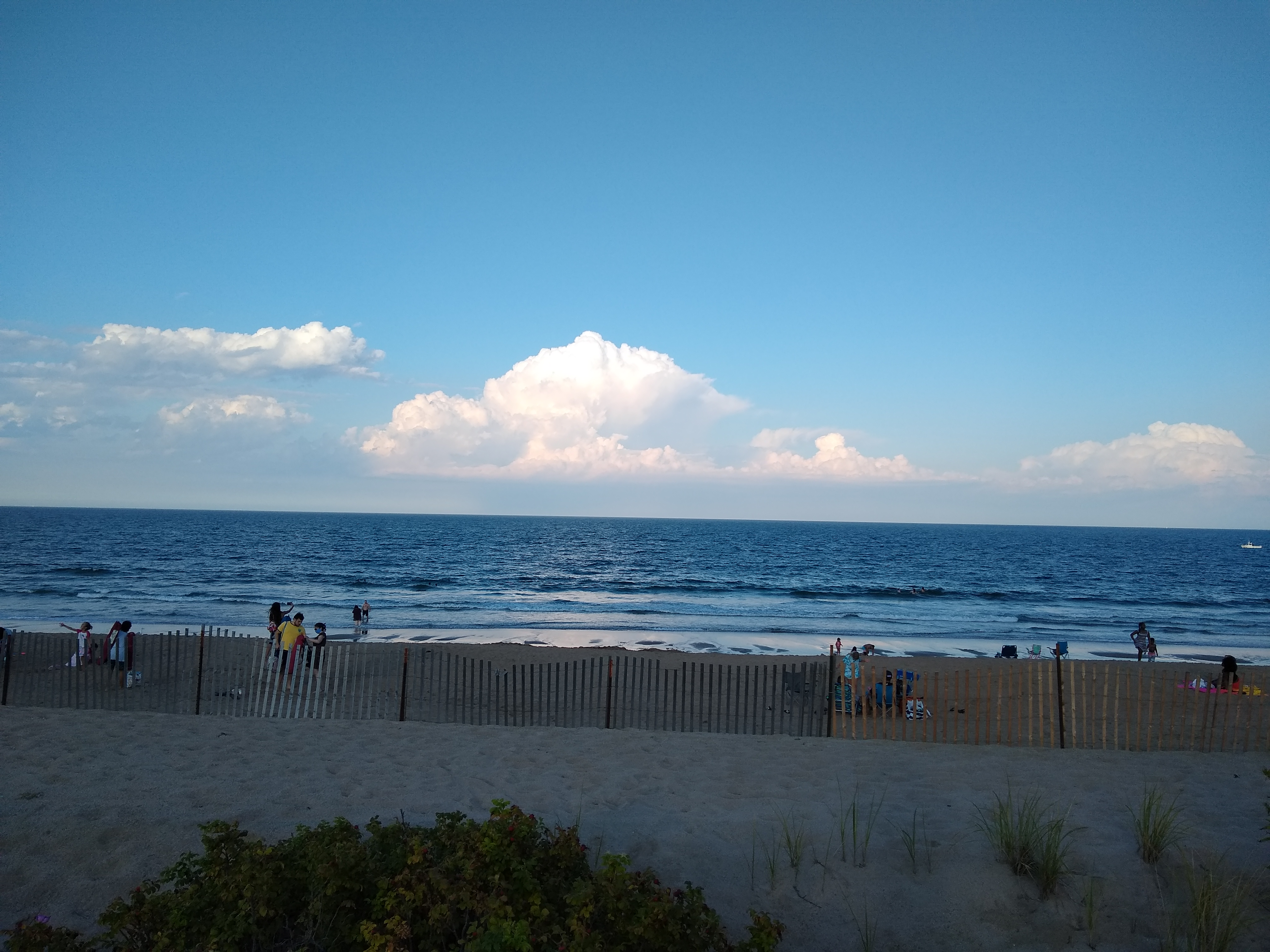
Salisbury Beach, just south of the center, in August 2020

== Notable people ==
- John Clough, a founder of the town, sailed on ship Elizabeth from England in 1635
- Bob Corkum (born 1967), ice hockey center
- Stephen Moody Crosby (1827–1909), politician, banker, and lawyer
- Caleb Cushing (1800–1879), congressman
- Hannah Webster Foster (1758/59–1840), novelist
- Horatio Balch Hackett (1808–1875), Biblical scholar
- Susannah Martin (1621–1692), witch trial victim
- Amos Morrill (1809–1884), judge
- James Pike (1818–1895), congressman
- John Wheelwright (c. 1592–1679), clergyman

== See also ==
- North Shore (Massachusetts)
- Salisbury Beach Military Reservation
