= List of mayors of Salem, Massachusetts =

Mayor of Salem
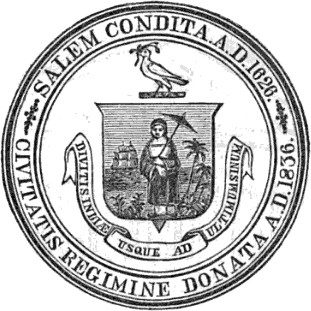
- Seal of Salem

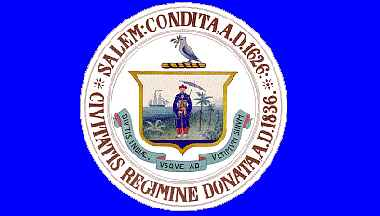
- Flag of Salem
- Incumbent; Dominick Pangallo since May 27, 2023
- Style: His/Her Honor
- Type: Chief executive
- Member of: School Committee; Board of Library Trustees; Board of Trust Fund Commissioners
- Residence: None official
- Seat: Salem City Hall
- Nominator: Nominating petition
- Appointer: Popular vote
- Term length: Four years
- Constituting instrument: Salem City Charter
- Precursor: Salem Board of Selectmen (1629–1836)
- Formation: 1836
- First holder: Leverett Saltonstall I
- Salary: $150,000 (2023)
- Website: www.salemma.gov/mayors-office

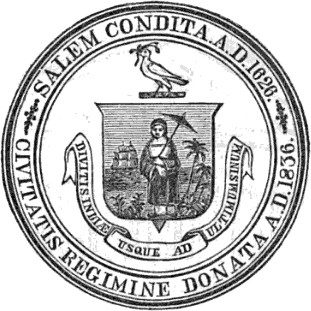
City Seal

The mayor of Salem is the head of municipal government of Salem, Massachusetts. There was no mayor of Salem until its city charter was accepted on March 23, 1836, prior to which Salem was still incorporated as a town.

== List ==
#	Mayor	Picture	Term	Party	Notes
1st	Leverett Saltonstall		1836–1838	Whig	First mayor under the original city charter, (which included a bicameral legislative body). From 1836 to 1856 the Municipal year ended on the second Monday in March.
2nd	Stephen C. Phillips		1838–1842	Whig	
3rd	Stephen Palfrey Webb		1842–1845	Whig	Also served as the twelfth Mayor of Salem. From 1854 to 1855 Webb served as the sixth Mayor of San Francisco, California
4th	Joseph S. Cabot		1845–1849	Whig	
5th	Nathaniel Silsbee, Jr.		1849–1851	Whig	
6th	David Pingree		1851–1852	Independent	
7th	Charles Wentworth Upham		1852–1853	Whig	
8th	Asahel Huntington		1853–1854	Know Nothing	
9th	Joseph Andrews		1854–1856	Know Nothing	From 1856 to 1874 inclusive the Municipal year ended on the Fourth Monday in January.
10th	William S. Messervy		1856–1858	Democratic	
11th	Nathaniel Silsbee, Jr.		1858–1859	Republican	
12th	Stephen Palfrey Webb		1860–1862	Republican	Second time as Mayor of Salem. From 1854 to 1855 Webb served as the sixth Mayor of San Francisco, California
13th	Stephen G. Wheatland		1863–1864	Democratic	
14th	Joseph B. F. Osgood		1865–1865	Republican	
15th	David Roberts		January 1866 – September 26, 1867	Republican	Roberts resigned as a result of disagreement with the Board of Aldermen.
16th	William Cogswell		September 26, 1867 – 1869	Republican	
17th	Nathanial Brown		1870–1871	None	
18th	Samuel Calley		1872–1872	Republican	
19th	William Cogswell		1873–1875	Republican	From 1875 on the Municipal year ends on the First Monday in January.
20th	Henry Laurens Williams		1875–1876	None	
21st	Henry K. Oliver		1877–1880	Republican	
22nd	Samuel Calley		1881–1882	Republican	
23rd	William M. Hill		1883–1884	None	
24th	Arthur L. Huntington		1885–1885	None	
25th	John M. Raymond		1886–1887	None	
26th	Robert S. Rantoul		1890–1893	Democratic	
27th	James H. Turner		1894–1897	None	
28th	David P. Waters		1898–1898	None	
29th	James H. Turner		1899–1899	None	
30th	David M. Little		1900–1900	None	
31st	John F. Hurley		1901–1902	None	
32nd	Joseph N. Peterson		1903–1905	Republican	
33rd	Thomas G. Pinnock		1906–1907	Republican	
34th	John F. Hurley		1908–1909	None	
35th	Arthur Howard		1910–1910	None	
36th	Rufus D. Adams		1911–1912	Republican	Last mayor under the Original (1836) city charter.
37th	John F. Hurley		1913–1915		First Mayor under the second city charter adopted in November 1912. Was Recalled by the voters December 29, 1914.
38th	Mathias J. O'Keefe		1915–1915		Elected to finish out John F. Hurley's three-year term in the December 29, 1914 election that recalled Mayor Hurley.
39th	Henry P. Benson		1916–1917		Last Mayor under the second (1912) city charter (Commission form of Government).
40th	Denis J. Sullivan		1918–1923	Democratic	First Mayor under the January 3, 1916 (Plan B) city charter.
41st	George J. Bates		1924–1937	Republican	Served in U.S. House from January 3, 1937 – November 1, 1949.
42nd	Edward A. Coffey		1938–1947	Republican	
43rd	Joseph B. Harrington		1948–1949	Democratic	
44th	Francis X. Collins		1950–1969	Democratic	
45th	Samuel Edward Zoll		1970–1973	Democratic	
46th	Jean A. Levesque		1973–1983	Republican	
47th	Anthony V. Salvo		1984–1989	Democratic	
48th	Neil J. Harrington		1990–1997	Democratic	
49th	Stanley J. Usovicz, Jr.		1998–2005	Democratic	
50th	Kim Driscoll		January 2006 – January 4, 2023	Democratic	Elected Lieutenant Governor of Massachusetts in the 2022 election
51st	Bob McCarthy		January 4, 2023 – May 27, 2023		Elected by Salem City Council as Acting Mayor following resignation of Mayor Kim Driscoll.
52nd	Dominick Pangallo		May 27, 2023 – Present	Democratic	Elected Mayor in special election on May 16, 2023, to complete Mayor Kim Driscoll's term.

== See also ==
- Timeline of Salem, Massachusetts
