= Rantoul =

Rantoul may refer to:

== Places ==
In the United States:

- Rantoul, Illinois
- Rantoul (Amtrak station), a train station in Rantoul, Illinois
- Rantoul, Kansas
- Rantoul, Wisconsin

== People ==
- Robert Rantoul, Jr., US Senator and US Representative from Massachusetts
- Robert S. Rantoul, mayor of Salem, Massachusetts
