= Robert Rantoul =

Robert Rantoul may refer to:

- Robert Rantoul Jr. (1805–1852), American lawyer and politician from Massachusetts
- Robert S. Rantoul (1832–1922), American politician from Salem, Massachusetts
