= Joseph S. Cabot =

Massachusetts banker and politician

Joseph Sebastian Cabot
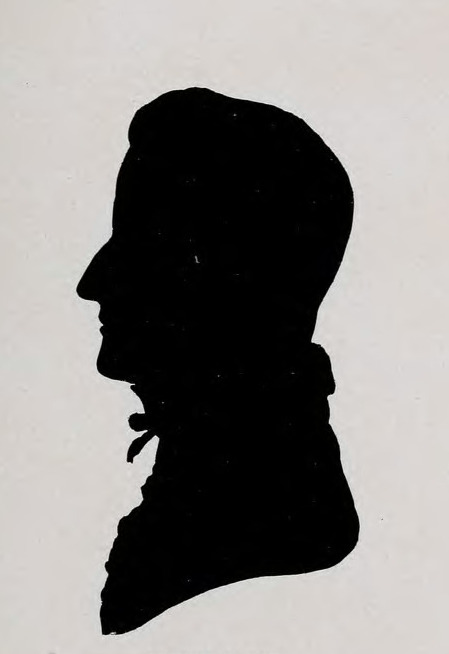

4th Mayor of Salem, Massachusetts
- In office 1845–1849
- Preceded by: Stephen Palfrey Webb
- Succeeded by: Nathaniel Silsbee, Jr.

Personal details
- Born: October 8, 1796 Salem, Massachusetts
- Died: June 29, 1874 (aged 77) Salem, Massachusetts
- Party: Democratic
- Spouse: Martha Laurens Stearns
- Education: Harvard, 1815
- Profession: Bank president

Joseph Sebastian Cabot (October 8, 1796 – June 29, 1874) was a Massachusetts banker and politician who served as the fourth Mayor of Salem, Massachusetts.

Cabot was president of the Asiatic Bank, the Salem Savings Bank, and the Massachusetts Horticultural Society. He was also the Massachusetts State Bank Commissioner.

In 1838, Cabot's name was submitted for a fourth consecutive Democratic nomination to the United States House of Representatives from the south Essex County district, but the district convention at Salem chose Robert Rantoul Jr. The nomination provoked a dispute between Rantoul and Benjamin F. Hallett, who supported Cabot and was in competition with Rantoul for the position of United States Attorney. Rantoul went on to lose to Whig incumbent Leverett Saltonstall I with a significant write-in vote for Cabot. Rantoul claimed these votes were cast by Gloucester fishermen returning from long months at sea who had been misinformed that Cabot was the Democratic nominee by "disorganizers."

Political offices
Preceded by Stephen Palfrey Webb	4th Mayor of Salem, Massachusetts; 1845–1849	Succeeded by Nathaniel Silsbee, Jr.
