= William Cogswell =

American politician

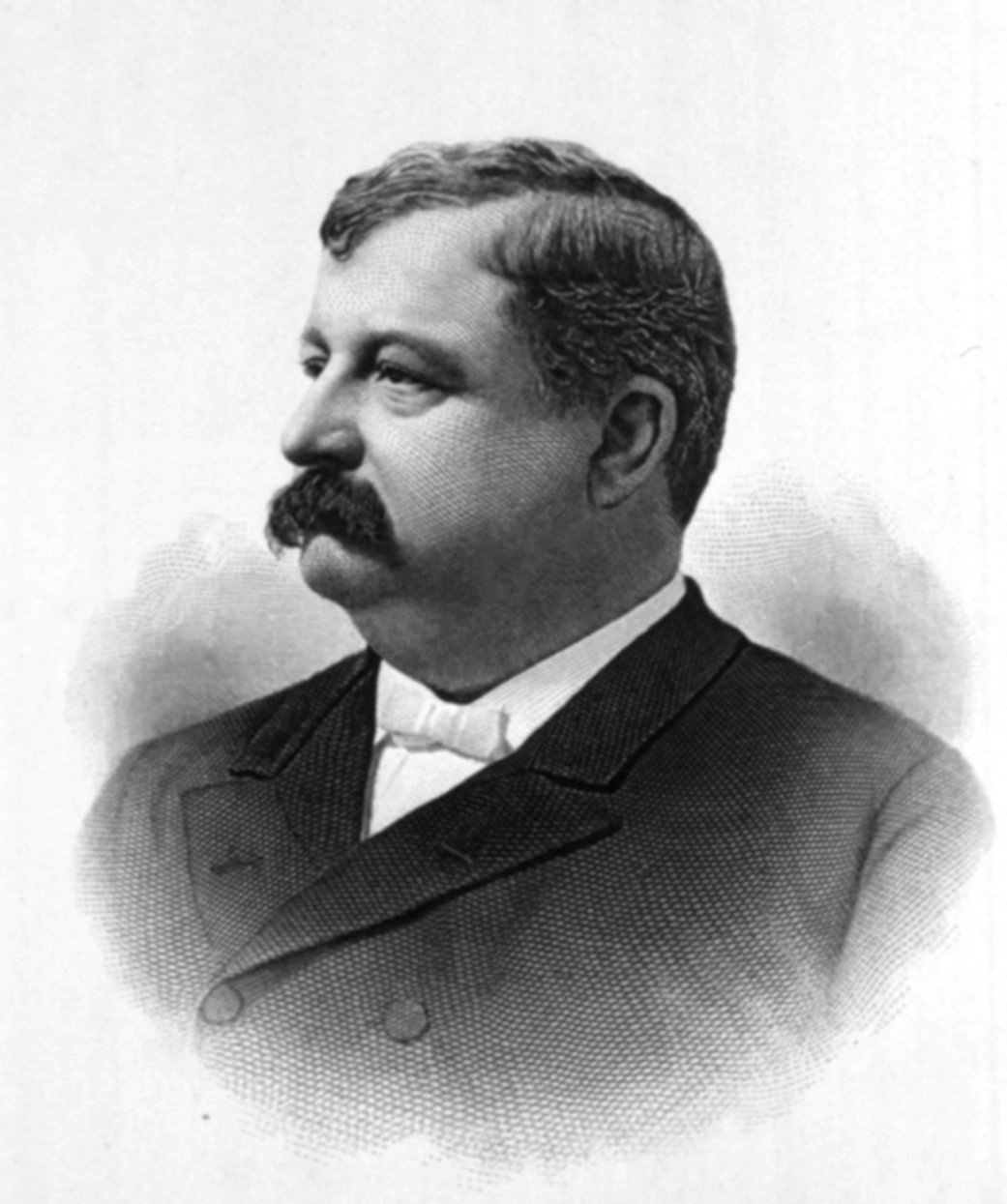
- William Cogswell while a U.S. Representative

Member of the U.S. House of Representatives from Massachusetts
- In office March 4, 1887 – May 22, 1895
- Preceded by: Eben F. Stone
- Succeeded by: William Henry Moody
- Constituency: 7th district (1887–93); 6th district (1893–95)

Member of the Massachusetts Senate
- In office 1885–1886

Member of the Massachusetts House of Representatives
- In office 1870–1871
- In office 1881–1883

16th and 19th Mayor of Salem
- In office September 26, 1867 – 1869
- Preceded by: David Roberts
- Succeeded by: Nathanial Brown
- In office 1873–1874
- Preceded by: Samuel Calley
- Succeeded by: Henry Laurens Williams

Personal details
- Born: August 23, 1838 Bradford, Massachusetts, U.S.
- Died: May 22, 1895 (aged 56) Washington, D.C., U.S.
- Party: Republican
- Spouse(s): Emma Thorndike Proctor (m. 1865, d. 1877); Eva M. Davis (m. 1881)
- Children: William; Emma Silsby
- Education: Atkinson Academy; Kimball Union Academy; Phillips Academy
- Alma mater: Dartmouth College; Harvard Law School
- Profession: Attorney

Military service
- Allegiance: (United States) United States; Union
- Branch/service: United States Army; Union Army
- Years of service: 1861 - 1865
- Rank: Colonel; Brevet Brigadier General
- Commands: 2nd Regiment Massachusetts Volunteer Infantry, 3rd Brigade, 3rd Division, XX Corps
- Battles/wars: American Civil War

William Cogswell (August 23, 1838 – May 22, 1895) was a U.S. representative from Massachusetts and a colonel in the Union Army during the American Civil War who was appointed to the grade of brevet brigadier general, U.S. Volunteers.

== Biography ==
Cogswell was born in Bradford, Massachusetts, to George Cogswell and Abigail (Parker) Cogswell. Cogswell's father was a well-respected surgeon and one of the founders of the Massachusetts Republican Party. His grandfather, William Cogswell, was a surgeon's mate in the Revolutionary War who practiced medicine in Atkinson, New Hampshire, and gave land for the Atkinson Academy. Abigail's mother died when he was about 7 years old.

Cogswell attended Atkinson Academy, Kimball Union Academy in Meriden, New Hampshire, Phillips Academy in Andover, Massachusetts, and Dartmouth College in Hanover, New Hampshire.

Cogswell entered Dartmouth in 1855, leaving it soon after. From 1856 to 1857 he went on a voyage around the world, spending two years as a sailor. When Cogswell returned from his voyage he entered Harvard Law School.

== Law practice ==
On September 8, 1860, Cogswell was admitted to the bar in Essex County, Massachusetts. He worked for a while in the office of Attorney William D. Northend, and in April 1861 Cogswell opened his own office in Salem, Massachusetts.

== Military service ==
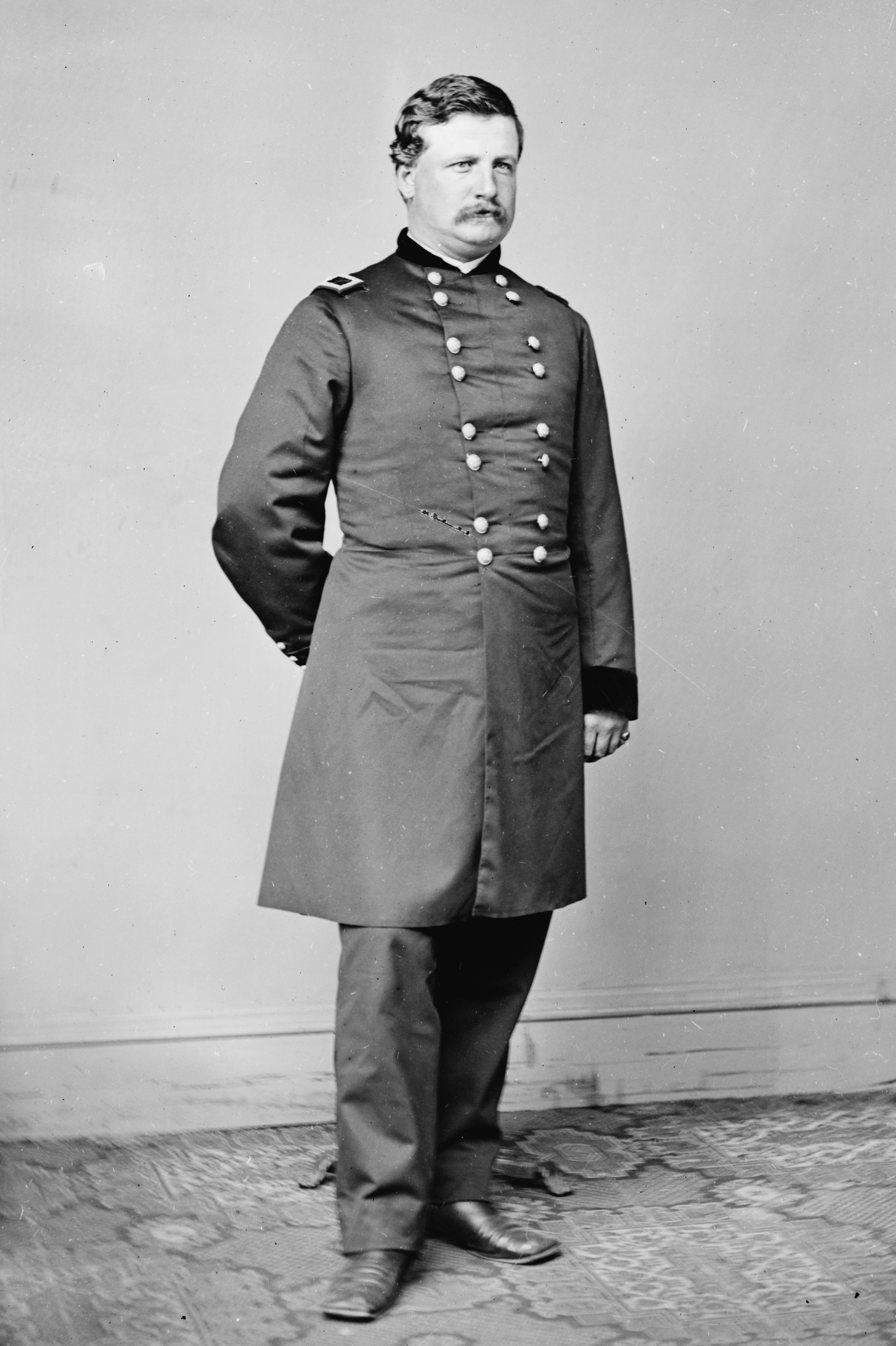
William Cogswell, circa 1861.

Cogswell was a private in the Second Corps of Cadets, a militia organization of the Commonwealth of Massachusetts. Cogswell served in the Second Corps of Cadets during the winter of 1860–1861.

On April 19, 1861, word reached Salem that the Sixth Massachusetts had been attacked in Baltimore while on its way to defend Washington, D.C. Cogswell turned his office into a recruiting station and in 24 hours raised a full company, the first company in the country recruited for the war. This became Company C of the Second Massachusetts Volunteers, with Cogswell as captain in command.

Cogswell was commissioned a captain in the Second Massachusetts Volunteer Infantry Regiment, May 11, 1861. He was promoted to lieutenant colonel on October 23, 1862, and to colonel on June 25, 1863.

Colonel Cogswell was appointed brevet brigadier general of volunteers by appointment of President Abraham Lincoln on December 12, 1864, to rank from December 15, 1864, and the appointment was confirmed by the United States Senate on February 14, 1865. Colonel and Brevet Brigadier General Cogswell was mustered out of the U.S. Volunteers on July 24, 1865. Later, he was elected as a companion of the Massachusetts Commandery of the Military Order of the Loyal Legion of the United States.

After the Civil War Cogswell resumed the practice of his profession.

== Political activities ==
He served as mayor of Salem 1867–1869, 1873, and 1874. He served as member of the Massachusetts House of Representatives 1870, 1871, and 1881–1883. He served in the Massachusetts State Senate in 1885 and 1886. He served as delegate to the Republican National Convention in 1892.

== Congressional service ==
Cogswell was elected as a Republican to the 50th United States Congress and to the four succeeding Congresses and served from March 4, 1887, until his death in Washington, D.C., May 22, 1895. He was interred in Harmony Grove Cemetery, Salem, Massachusetts.

== Personal life ==
Cogswell married Emma Thorndike Proctor on June 20, 1865. They had two children, William and Emma Silsby Cogswell. Emma died on April 1, 1877. Cogswell remarried to Eva M. Davis on December 12, 1881 and they remained married until his death, having no children.

== See also ==
- List of American Civil War brevet generals (Union)
- List of Massachusetts generals in the American Civil War
- Massachusetts in the American Civil War
- List of members of the United States Congress who died in office (1790–1899)

== Notes ==
Political offices
Preceded by David Roberts	Mayor of Salem, Massachusetts; September 26, 1867 – 1869	Succeeded by Nathanial Brown
Preceded by Samuel Calley	Mayor of Salem, Massachusetts; 1872 – 1872	Succeeded by Henry Laurens Williams
U.S. House of Representatives
Preceded by Eben F. Stone	Member of the U.S. House of Representatives from Massachusetts's 7th congressional district March 4, 1887 – March 3, 1893	Succeeded by William Everett
Preceded by Henry Cabot Lodge	Member of the U.S. House of Representatives from Massachusetts's 6th congressional district March 4, 1893 – May 22, 1895	Succeeded by William H. Moody
