= Felix Irzyk =

American politician (1895–1978)

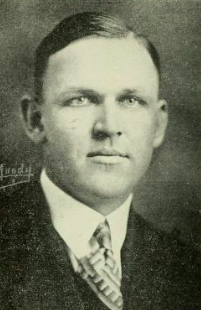
- Irzyk as a member of the Massachusetts House of Representatives

Member of the Massachusetts House of Representatives for the 13th Essex district
- In office 1931–1934
- Preceded by: Denis J. Sullivan
- Succeeded by: Edward A. Coffey

Personal details
- Born: April 17, 1895 Congress Poland
- Died: February 7, 1978 (aged 82) Salem, Massachusetts, U.S.
- Party: Democratic
- Children: 3, including Albin
- Occupation: Saint Mary's Cemetery; Salem, Massachusetts, U.S.

Felix Irzyk (April 17, 1895 – February 7, 1978) was a Polish–American politician who was a member of the Massachusetts House of Representatives from 1931 to 1934. He was the first person born in Poland to serve in the Massachusetts General Court.

== Early life ==
Irzyk was born in Congress Poland on April 17, 1895. He was educated in the Salem Public Schools and attended the SS. Cyril and Methodius Seminary. His education stopped at the fifth grade and he worked as a shoe cutter. He later became an insurance agent. Irzyk married another Polish immigrant, Sophia Mroczka. They had three children – Albin, Flora, and Arthur. Albin F. Irzyk was a brigadier general in the United States Army and commanded a battalion of the 4th Armored Division during the Battle of the Bulge.

== Politics ==
In 1926, Irzyk defeated 11-year incumbent John H. Greely for the Ward 1 seat on the Salem city council. In 1930, he defeated incumbent Denis J. Sullivan to win the Democratic nomination for the Massachusetts House of Representatives seat in the 13th Essex district. In the general election, he defeated Republican Frederick J. Donovan 2,729 votes to 1,990. He was the first person born in Poland elected to the Massachusetts House of Representatives. He was reelected in 1932, but did not run in 1934. Irzyk briefly worked as a laborer in the Salem parks department, but was fired by mayor Joseph B. Harrington after he opposed the mayor's proposal to sell a parcel of city land to the New England Power Company at a state legislative hearing.
