= William Cogswell (New Hampshire physician) =

American physician

William Cogswell (July 11, 1760 – January 1, 1831) was a surgeon's mate in the American Revolutionary War and later practiced medicine. He was the grandfather of Congressman William Cogswell.

He was born in Haverhill, Massachusetts, brother of Captain Amos Cogswell and Captain Thomas Cogswell. He enlisted at age 15 and was a private in Thomas Cogswell's company in the 26th Continental Regiment from January–December 1776. He then left to study medicine, and rejoined in 1778, appointed Hospital Surgeon's Mate at West Point in 1781, Surgeon Chief and Chief Medical Officer of the Army, 1784–1785. He was a doctor in Atkinson, New Hampshire, an original member and president of the board of the New Hampshire Medical Society, and a justice of the peace. He gave the land for the Atkinson Academy. He married Judith Badger in 1786 and had nine children.
