= Charles Henry Odell =

American sailor and politician

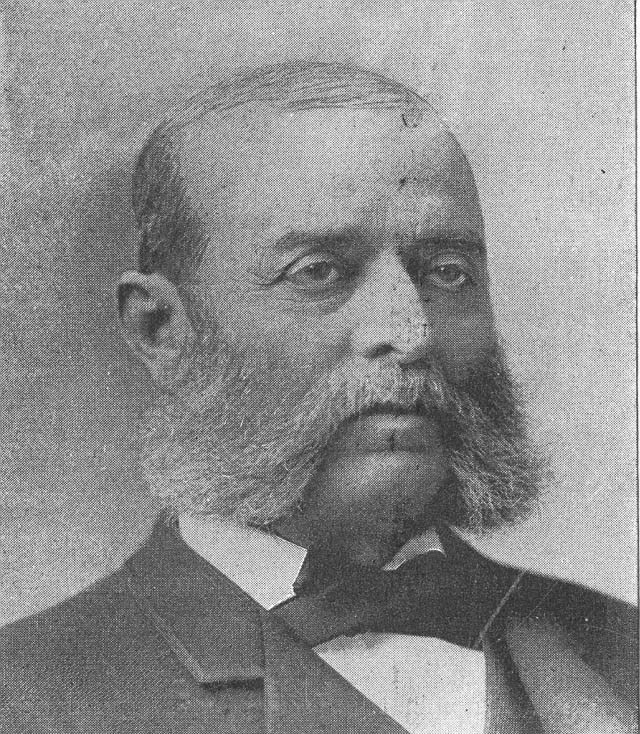
Charles H. Odell

Charles Henry Odell (April 11, 1829 – April 25, 1897) was an American sailor, politician, and soldier.

== Career ==
Odell was involved in the Maritime transport industry focused on routes between Beverly, Salem, and East Asia. He was a chief mate on the barque Hollander and captained the ship Element of New York. Odell served as a Captain in the Union Army via the 8th Massachusetts Militia Regiment where he was activated on September 19, 1862 and decommissioned on August 7, 1863.

== Politics ==
Odell was active in Essex County, Massachusetts politics. After serving in the Massachusetts House of Representatives and on several Town of Beverly boards and organizations, including the Selectboard and the Board of Overseers of the Poor, he began serving in the federal government.

On March 20, 1873, Ulysses S. Grant appointed Odell as the inspector and collector for the Ports of Charlestown, Boston, Salem and Beverly. He was reappointed as such in Salem and Beverly until his commission expired on May 13, 1885.

On July 11, 1890, Benjamin Harrison appointed Odell postmaster of the Town of Beverly, Massachusetts.

In March 1896, Odell served as the second mayor of the newly formed City of Beverly. He was the first mayor of the new city from the neighborhood of Montserrat and out of respect refused to run until the incumbent, John I. Baker, retired.

== Death ==
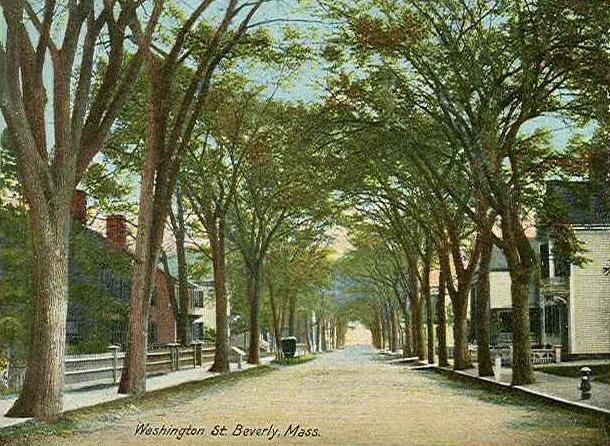
Washington Street in Beverly

Odell died of Cardiac hypertrophy on April 25, 1897 at 3 pm at 23 Washington Street in Beverly, Massachusetts.

Government offices
Preceded by John I. Baker	Mayor of Beverly, Massachusetts; 1896	Succeeded by Freeborn Cressy
Preceded by Charles W. Palfray	Collector of Customs for the District of Salem and Beverly; 1873–1885	Succeeded by Richard F. Dodge
