= Nathaniel Silsbee Jr. =

American politician

Mayor of Salem, Massachusetts
- In office 1858–1859
- Preceded by: William S. Messervy
- Succeeded by: Stephen Palfrey Webb
- In office 1849–1851
- Preceded by: Joseph S. Cabot
- Succeeded by: David Pingree

Member of the Salem Board of Aldermen
- In office 1851–1852

Personal details
- Born: December 28, 1804 Salem, Massachusetts
- Died: July 9, 1881 (aged 76) Milton, Massachusetts
- Party: Whig
- Spouse: Mary Ann Cabot Devereux (m. 1829; died 1881)
- Relations: Jared Sparks (brother-in-law)
- Parent(s): Nathaniel Silsbee; Mary Crowninshield
- Education: Harvard College

Nathaniel Silsbee Jr. (December 28, 1804 – July 9, 1881) was a Massachusetts businessman and politician who served as a member of the Massachusetts House of Representatives, and twice as the Mayor of Salem, Massachusetts, and was for many years the treasurer of Harvard.

== Early life ==
Silsbee was born on December 28, 1804 in Salem, Massachusetts. He was the son of former U.S. Senator Nathaniel Silsbee and Mary (née Crowninshield) Silsbee. His sister, Mary Crowninshield Silsbee, was the wife of Jared Sparks, the 17th President of Harvard College, and another sister, Georgiana Crowninshield Silsbee, was the wife of Francis Henry Appleton and Henry Saltonstall.

His paternal grandparents were Sarah (née Becket) Silsbee and Capt. Nathaniel Silsbee, and his maternal grandparents were Mary (née Derby) Crowninshield and Capt. George Crowninshield, one of Salem's wealthiest merchants. Among his extended family were maternal uncles, Secretary of the Navy Benjamin Williams Crowninshield, U.S. Representative Jacob Crowninshield, and George Crowninshield Jr., who owned Cleopatra's Barge, the first yacht to cross the Atlantic.

Silsbee graduated from Harvard College with an A.B. degree in 1824 and an A.M. degree in 1862.

== Career ==
Silsbee served as the 5th Mayor of Salem, Massachusetts, from 1849 to 1850, and, again, as the 11th Mayor of Salem from 1858 to 1859. From 1851 to 1852, he was also a member of the Salem, Massachusetts Board of Aldermen.

He was also a member of the Massachusetts House of Representatives from the Essex district in 1833, 1846 and in the extra special session called in 1848 to choose presidential electors. He also served as treasurer of Harvard College from 1862 to 1876 during the presidency of Thomas Hill and Charles William Eliot.

== Personal life ==
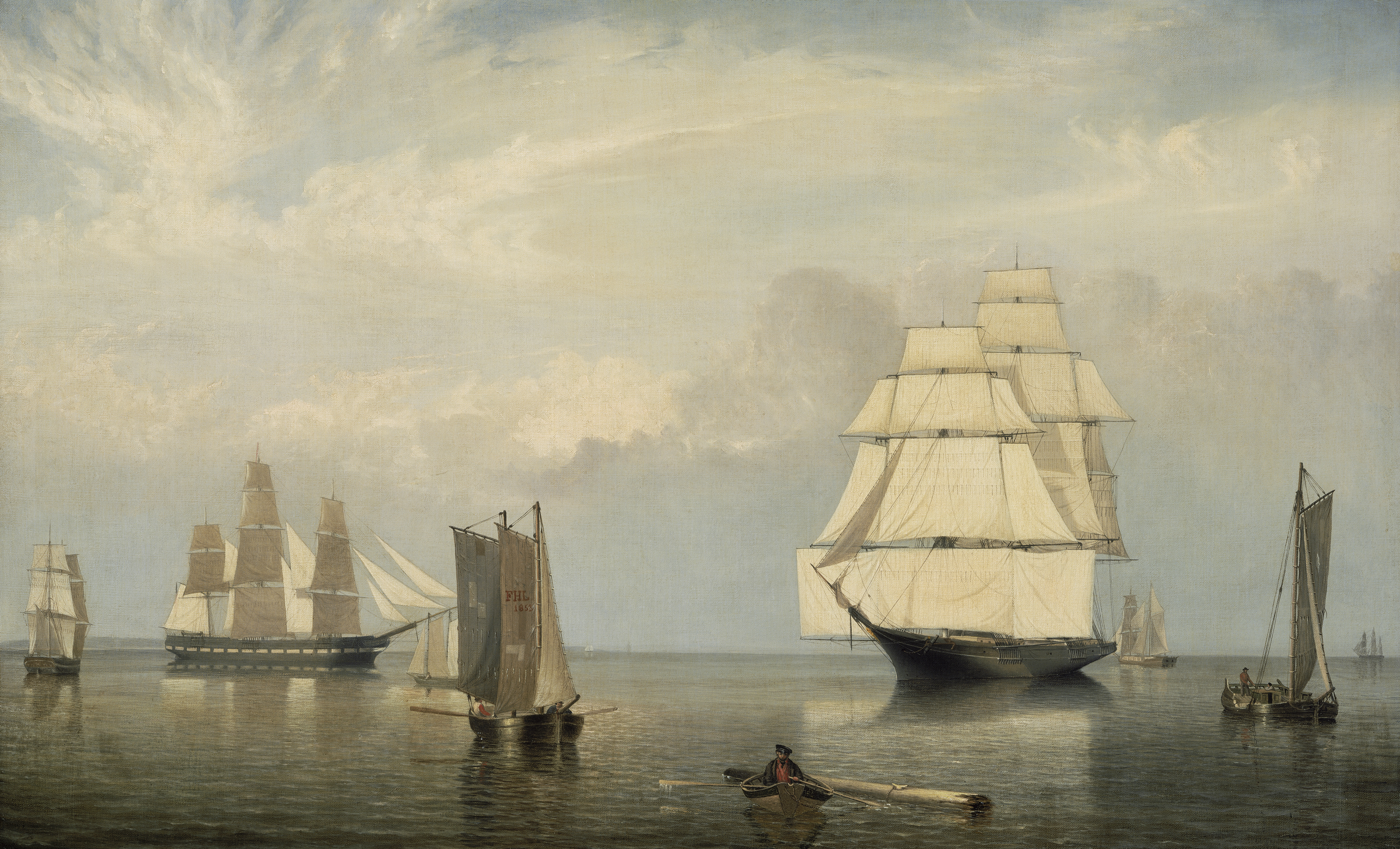
Salem Harbor oil on canvas, 1853. Museum of Fine Arts, Boston

On November 9, 1829, Silsbee married Mary Ann Cabot Devereux (1812–1889), a daughter of Humphrey Devereux and Eliza (née Dodge) Devereux, in Salem. Her brother was Adj. Gen. George Humphrey Devereux (father of Arthur F. Devereux). Together, they were the parents of:

- Nathaniel Devereaux Silsbee (1830–1912), who married Mary Stone Hodges, a daughter of George Hodges, in 1856.
- Mary Crowninshield Silsbee (1840–1928), who married Frederick Augustus Whitwell, a son of Samuel Whitwell, in 1861.
- William Edward Silsbee (1845–1908), who never married.

He was also a collector of art, and acquired the 1853 painting, Salem Harbor, from the artist Fitz Henry Lane.

Silsbee died in Milton, Massachusetts on July 9, 1881.

Political offices
Preceded by Joseph S. Cabot	5th Mayor of Salem, Massachusetts; 1849–1851	Succeeded by David Pingree
Preceded by William S. Messervy	11th Mayor of Salem, Massachusetts; 1858–1859	Succeeded by Stephen Palfrey Webb
Preceded by	Member of the Massachusetts House of Representatives from the Essex district 1833, 1846, 1848	Succeeded by
