= Albin F. Irzyk =

American brigadier general (1917–2018)

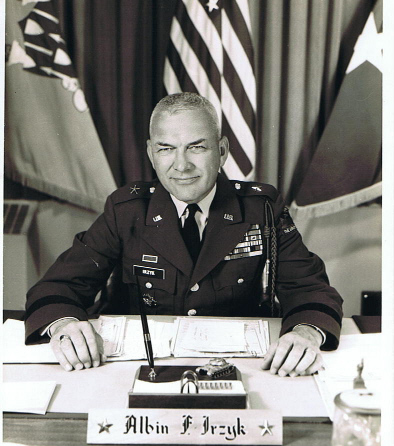
- Born: January 2, 1917; Salem, Massachusetts, U.S.
- Died: September 10, 2018 (aged 101); West Palm Beach, Florida, U.S.
- Relatives: Felix Irzyk (father)
- Military career
- Allegiance: United States of America
- Branch: United States Army
- Service years: 1940–1971
- Rank: Brigadier general
- Commands: 14th Armored Cavalry Regiment
- Conflicts: World War II; Berlin Crisis of 1961; Vietnam War
- Awards: Distinguished Service Cross; Distinguished Service Medal (U.S. Army); Silver Star (2); Bronze Star (4); Purple Heart (2); Legion of Merit (U.S. Army) (3); Air Medal (11); Legion of Honour (France); Order of the Crown (Belgium); Croix de guerre 1939–1945 (France); Czechoslovak War Cross 1939–1945; Gallantry Cross (South Vietnam)

Albin Felix Irzyk (January 2, 1917 – September 10, 2018) was an American brigadier general who was the oldest living veteran of the 3rd Cavalry Regiment. Joining the Army in 1940, he was the Commander of the 8th Tank Battalion of the 4th Armored Division of the United States Army during World War II, the Commander of the 14th Armored Cavalry Regiment during the Berlin Crisis of 1961, and Assistant Commander of the 4th Infantry Division in South Vietnam during his career.

== Early life and education ==
Irzyk was born on January 2, 1917, in Salem, Massachusetts. His parents, Felix and Sophia (Mroczka) Irzyk, had immigrated from Poland. Felix Irzyk was the first person born in Poland to serve in the Massachusetts House of Representatives.

While at the University of Massachusetts Amherst, he received a bachelor's degree, and a commission from the Reserve Officers' Training Corps (ROTC) in the Horse Cavalry. Irzyk also has a master's degree in International Relations from the American University in Washington, D.C., and graduated from the National War College.

== Military career ==
Irzyk enlisted in the United States Army in 1940. During the Battle of the Bulge, he led 74 tanks and 3,500 soldiers and helped liberate the Ohrdruf concentration camp.

In January 1968, Irzyk was commander of the Army's Headquarters Area Command in Saigon, in this role Irzyk organised the quick-reaction forces in the city that countered the Viet Cong Tet Offensive.

He retired from the army as the Commanding General of Fort Devens, Massachusetts in 1971.

== Writing career ==
Irzyk has written multiple books, including an autobiographical book He Rode Up Front for Patton (1996) and Patton's Juggernaut (2017).

== Legacy and honors ==
In 1999, a park on Fort Avenue in Salem, Massachusetts was dedicated to him. There is a military tank displayed there.

He turned 100 in January 2017 and died on September 10, 2018, at the age of 101 in West Palm Beach, Florida. He was buried in Arlington National Cemetery.

== Awards ==
- Distinguished Service Cross
- Distinguished Service Medal (U.S. Army)
- Silver Star (2)
- Bronze Star (4)
- Purple Heart (2)
- Legion of Merit (U.S. Army) (3)
- Air Medal (11)
- Legion of Honour (France)
- Order of the Crown (Belgium) (Officer)
- Croix de guerre 1939–1945 (France)
- Czechoslovak War Cross 1939–1945
- Gallantry Cross (South Vietnam)
