= George J. Bates =

American politician (1891–1949)

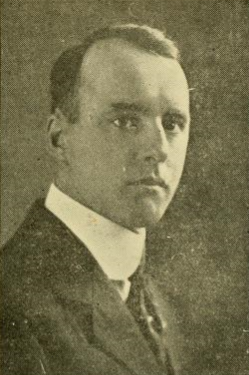
- George J. Bates as a Massachusetts State Representative in the early 1920s

Member of the U.S. House of Representatives from Massachusetts's 6th district
- In office January 3, 1937 – November 1, 1949
- Preceded by: A. Piatt Andrew
- Succeeded by: William H. Bates

41st Mayor of Salem, Massachusetts
- In office 1924–1937
- Preceded by: Denis J. Sullivan
- Succeeded by: Edward A. Coffey

Member of the Massachusetts House of Representatives Eighteenth Essex District
- In office 1918–1924
- Preceded by: Denis J. Sullivan
- Succeeded by: Francis E. Rafter

Personal details
- Born: George Joseph Bates; February 25, 1891 Salem, Massachusetts, U.S.
- Died: November 1, 1949 (aged 58) Alexandria, Virginia, U.S.
- Resting place: St. Mary's Cemetery in Salem
- Party: Republican
- Spouse: Nora Jennings
- Relations: John Mulaney (great grandson)
- Education: Bentley University

George Joseph Bates (February 25, 1891 – November 1, 1949) was a 20th-century American politician who served seven terms as a member of the United States House of Representatives from the state of Massachusetts from 1937 to 1949.

== Early life ==
Bates was born in Salem, Massachusetts, the son of Annie (Burns) and Thomas F. Bates. His first immigrant ancestor was Increase Bates who migrated from Buckinghamshire, England and settled in Salem, Massachusetts in 1629.

=== Early political career ===
He served in the Massachusetts House of Representatives from 1918 to 1924. He was then elected Mayor of Salem in 1924 at the age of 33. He served the remainder of his as mayor after he took his seat in Congress. While he was away in Washington, D.C., he did not take a salary from the city and acting mayor H. Francis Dolan handled most of the routine duties.

== Congress ==
After winning election in 1936, he was sworn in as a Republican member of the House in the 75th Congress on January 3, 1937.

=== World War II policies ===
During World War II, he was an interventionist. After the fall of France and before the Nazi invasion of Soviet Russia, Britain was effectively fighting the Nazis alone, throughout this time period Bates was outspokenly pro-British, and he advocated aiding Britain in any way possible, to help in their war against the Nazis.

In 1941 he was one of the few Republicans to abstain from voting on the 1941 Lend Lease Act. Bates voted in favor of arming merchant ships. Bates made good on his campaign promises and voted to increase lend-lease funding to the British military as well as food aid for British civilians during the Blitz.

=== Remaining career and succession ===
Bates was subsequently re-elected six times.

Following his death, Bates was succeeded in the House by his son, William Henry Bates.

== Death and burial ==
Bates died in the crash of Eastern Air Lines Flight 537 outside of Washington, D.C. on November 1, 1949. He was buried at St. Mary's Cemetery in Salem. Bates Elementary School in Salem is named after George J. Bates and his son.

== Family ==
His daughter, Carolyn (Bates) Stanton, is the maternal grandmother of comedian John Mulaney.

== See also ==
- 1918 Massachusetts legislature
- 1919 Massachusetts legislature
- 1920 Massachusetts legislature
- 1921–1922 Massachusetts legislature
- 1923–1924 Massachusetts legislature
- List of members of the United States Congress who died in office (1900–1949)

U.S. House of Representatives
Preceded by Abram Andrew	Member of the U.S. House of Representatives from Massachusetts's 6th congressional district January 3, 1937 – November 1, 1949	Succeeded by William H. Bates
Political offices
Preceded by Denis J. Sullivan	41st Mayor of Salem, Massachusetts; 1924–1937	Succeeded by Edward A. Coffey
