= William S. Messervy =

American trader and politician (1812–1886)

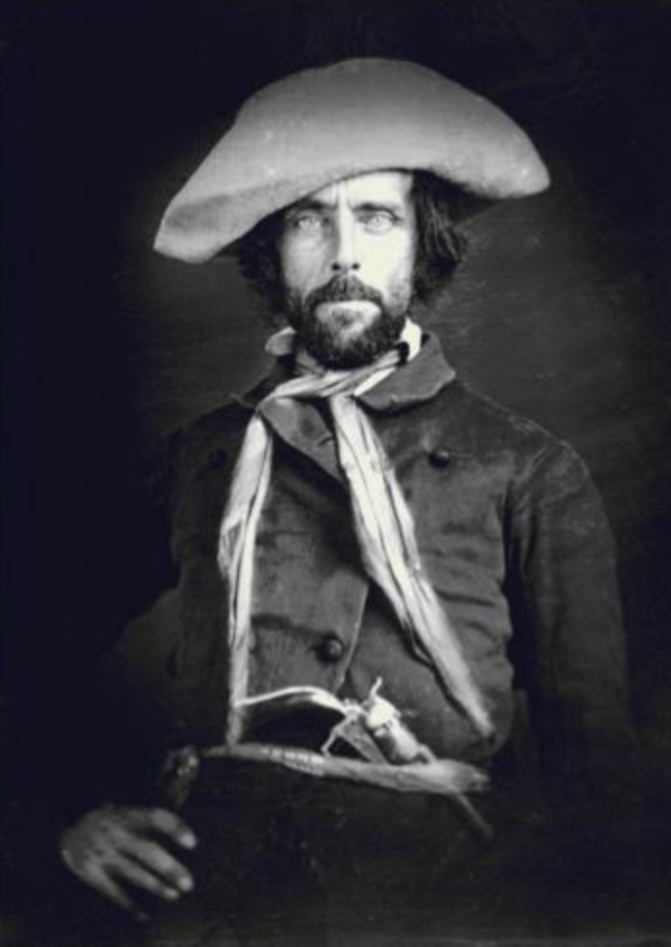
- Messervy about 1849

Delegate-elect to the United States House of Representatives
- In office June 20, 1850 – March 4, 1851
- Preceded by: New office
- Succeeded by: Richard Hanson Weightman

Secretary of New Mexico Territory
- In office April 8, 1853 – July 20, 1854
- Appointed by: President Franklin Pierce
- Preceded by: John Greiner
- Succeeded by: W. H. H. Davis

Acting Governor of New Mexico Territory
- In office April 1, 1854 – July 20, 1854
- Governor: David Meriwether

Mayor of Salem
- In office 1856–1858
- Preceded by: Joseph Andrews
- Succeeded by: Nathaniel Silsbee Jr.

Personal details
- Born: August 26, 1812 Salem, Massachusetts
- Died: February 19, 1886 (aged 73)
- Party: Democratic

William Sluman Messervy (August 26, 1812 – February 19, 1886) was an American trader on the Santa Fe Trail who in 1850 was elected to represent the New Mexico Territory in the United States House of Representatives. He did not take his seat because Congress did not yet recognize New Mexico’s territorial authority.

He later served as Secretary of the Territory and in 1854 was acting Governor of New Mexico.

In 1854, Messervy returned to his home town, Salem, Massachusetts, where he was elected as Mayor and became a Justice of the Peace.

== Early life ==
Messervy was born and raised in Salem, Massachusetts, the son of Captain William Messervy and his wife Eliza Passarow, who had been married in Boston in May 1810. His father was a ship’s master in the East Indies trade, among others. He was named for his maternal grandfather, Captain William Sluman, who had been killed while in command of a private armed vessel during the American Revolutionary War.

Messervy was the eldest son in a family of ten children. A younger brother, Thomas, went to sea in a whaler.

== Career ==
=== Business ===
After leaving school, Messervy began his career in business as a clerk and book-keeper in a large firm in Boston, and worked for several such firms. In 1834, he went west with a job in St. Louis, Missouri, later moving to Independence, Missouri. By 1839, he was trading on his own account with Mexico, and between the 1830s and 1854 traded goods on the Santa Fe Trail, with a warehouse in Chihuahua City, Mexico. He spent seven years living in Chihuahua, and then six in Santa Fe.

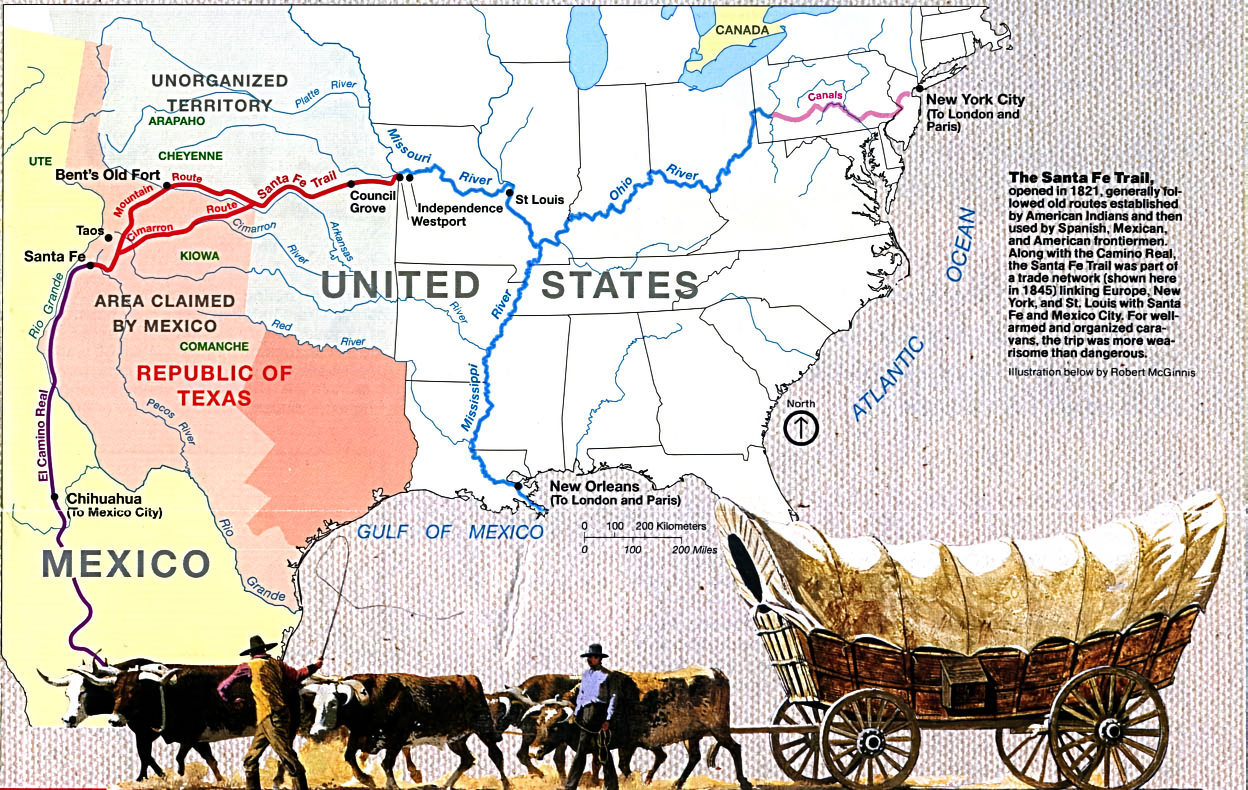
The Santa Fe Trail, c. 1845

In April 1846, at a time when Santa Fe was still part of the Mexican territory of Santa Fe de Nuevo México, Messervy was successfully sued for slander there by Marcelo Pacheco, who described him as "a trespasser who thinks he owns everything".

At the outbreak of the Mexican–American War later in April 1846, Messervy was in Chihuahua. Together with other United States citizens, he was interned there, until after the Battle of the Sacramento River in February 1847 he was freed by troops led by Colonel A. W. Doniphan. After the war ended early in 1848, Messervy ran his business from Santa Fe, now annexed by the US under the U.S. provisional government of New Mexico.

New Mexico Territory, 1852, including most of the later Arizona Territory, but not the Gadsden Purchase of 1854

In January 1850, Messervy went into partnership with James Josiah Webb, a younger man who was a native of Warren, Connecticut, in a trading firm called Messervy and Webb, with its headquarters in Santa Fe. Soon the leading merchant house in New Mexico, by 1851 it had between sixty and seventy wagons moving goods across the plains. The firm traded in general merchandise with all parts of New Mexico and dealt with natives of the region, as well as with American settlers, and with both the federal and territorial governments. A young man from Boston, John M. Kingsbury, joined the firm as clerk and book-keeper, and Messervy made trips to the east to buy goods. These were shipped by rail and canal to Pittsburgh, then by boat on the Ohio, Mississippi, and Missouri rivers to Kansas City, and finally by prairie schooner across the plains to New Mexico. From 1854, the Pennsylvania Railroad ran all the way to Pittsburgh.

=== Political career ===
==== Election as territorial delegate in Congress ====
On June 20, 1850, at the same time as the adoption of a state constitution for New Mexico, Messervy was elected as the first member of Congress from the new state. Although elected to serve in the 31st Congress, the U.S. House of Representatives did not recognize Messervy’s election because Congress did not accept New Mexico as a state. Messervy was therefore never officially seated in Congress.

When Congress passed the Compromise of 1850 on September 9, 1850, it included an organic act which organized the Territory of New Mexico, with boundaries taking in most of the later states of New Mexico and Arizona and parts of southern Colorado. Although Messervy is sometimes considered to have been elected as a non-voting Delegate, he was never seated in Congress. Following the Compromise of 1850, Richard Hanson Weightman was seated as the New Mexico Territory’s first delegate in Congress.

==== Later political offices ====
In 1852–1853, Messervy’s clerk J. M. Kingsbury was also employed as private secretary to the new Governor of the Territory, William Carr Lane.

In September 1852, Messervy became a member of the Essex Institute in Salem.

On April 8, 1853, Messervy was appointed by US President Franklin Pierce as Secretary of the New Mexico Territory.

On a trip to the east, Webb had found a wife, Florilla Slade, marrying her in Cornwall, Connecticut, on February 1, 1853. In the fall of that year, Kingsbury travelled to the east in search of a wife, and in December 1853, in Salem, he married Messervy’s sister Kate, a match which Messervy and Webb had both encouraged. Kate Messervy was already suffering from tuberculosis, and she also suffered from depression. At about this time, Messervy decided to retire from business, and in February 1854 Webb formed a new partnership with Kingsbury.

On February 25, 1854, from the Legislative Council of New Mexico, Messervy sent a memo to the US Congress headed "Jicarilla Indians". This complained that the Jicarillas "... move from place to place among the settlements; and they are continually committing depredations on the inhabitants, who have never as yet been able to obtain any redress unless they took the law into their own hands." It asked for the Jicarillas to be "settled in a small extent of country" and "induced to settle in a pueblo and cultivate the soil and support themselves".

On April 1, 1854, Messervy became acting Governor of New Mexico, by virtue of his office as Secretary, when another new Governor, David Meriwether, went out of state. On the same day, he bought the Exchange Hotel, Santa Fe, and rented it to his former clerk Thomas F. Bowler for $100 a month.

In April 1854, Messervy, in Santa Fe, wrote to Kingsbury that he would "give a dollar an hour if you and Webb were only here—it would take a great load off my shoulders."

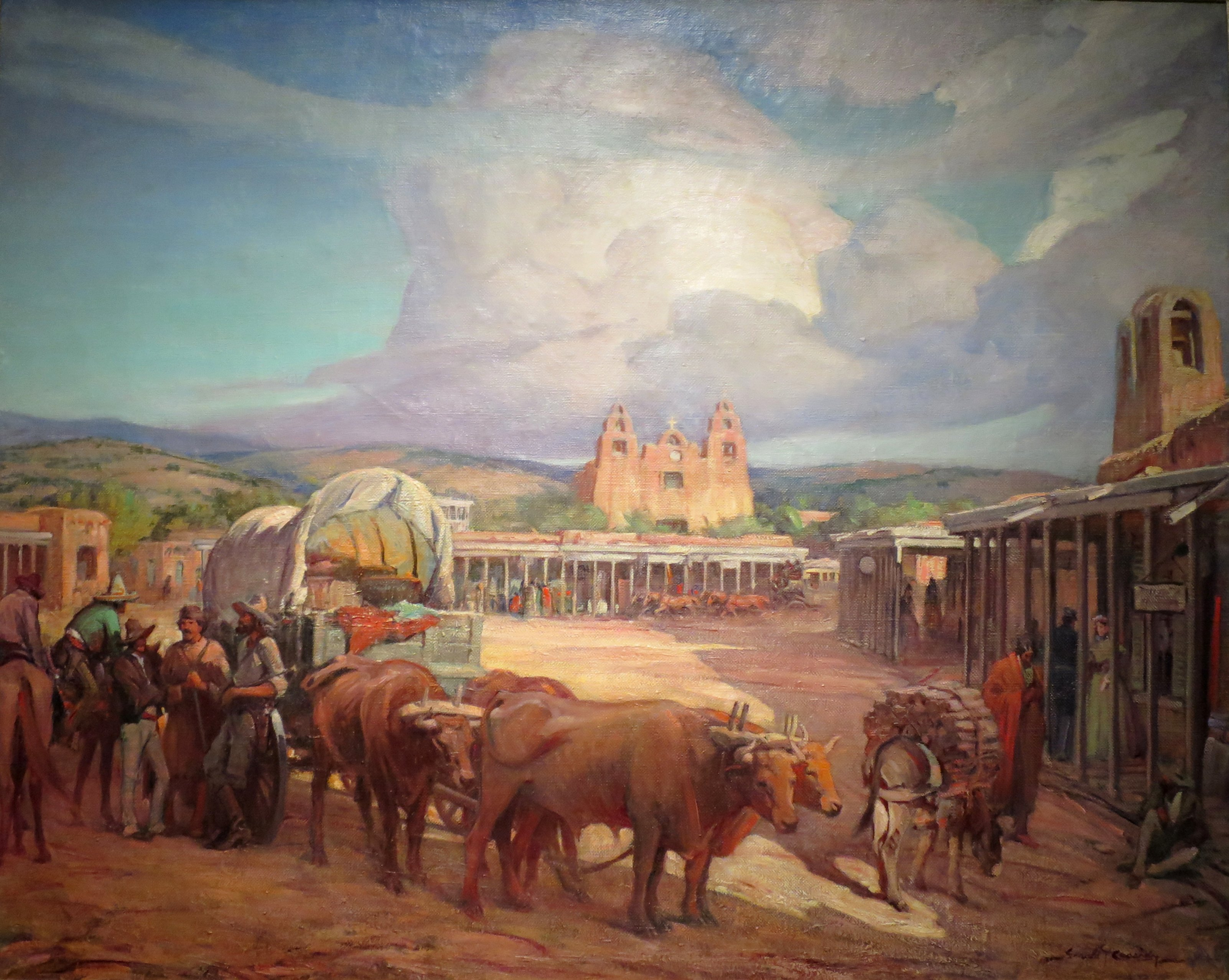
Santa Fe Plaza in the 1850s, by Gerald Cassidy

On April 25, 1854, Congress approved the Gadsden Purchase of land from Mexico, which increased the area of the New Mexico Territory by some 29,000 square miles.

At the end of April 1854, soon after the Battle of Cieneguilla in the war with the Jicarilla, Messervy was superintendent of Indian affairs in New Mexico, as well as acting Governor. On April 29, 1854, he wrote to the Commissioner of Indian Affairs, George Washington Manypenny:

"But as they have commenced this war I am determined unless otherwise instructed from your department to listen to no terms of peace from them… the best interest of this territory and the highest dictates of humanity demand their extinction or their settlement in pueblos."

This is sometimes reported as a response to the Fort Pueblo Massacre some eight months later.

In June 1854, Webb and Kingsbury returned to Santa Fe from the east with their new wives, and Messervy prepared to return to Salem. On June 30, the expansion of the Territory by the Gadsden Purchase took effect.

=== Salem, Massachusetts ===
On July 20, 1854, Messervy resigned as Secretary of the Territory, which also brought to an end his duties as acting Governor, and soon after that sold his house on the Santa Fe Plaza to the Kingsburys and Webbs. He then returned to Massachusetts, but for some years corresponded with his former partners. Kate Kingsbury decided not to spend her whole time in Santa Fe and also returned to the east, but she continued to make visits to her husband. She died on the trail to Santa Fe in June 1857.

In Salem, Messervy began to take part in public life and between 1856 and 1858 served as mayor of the town. His inaugural address on March 24, 1856, was printed. He was also appointed as a director of local corporations and was an active member of scientific and literary societies.

In November 1857, from Salem, Messervy sold the Exchange Hotel to his tenant Bowler for $5,000. In 1858, he was listed as a justice of the peace at Salem.

Messervy was an Old Line Democrat, but during the American Civil War was a strong Republican.

== Personal life ==
In a passport application in March 1841, Messervy was described as born in Salem, twenty-eight years old, five feet four inches in height, with blue eyes, light coloured hair, and a long face and chin.

Soon after his return to Salem, Messervy married Lucy Jane Dodge and with her had two sons.

At the 1870 United States census, Messervy was recorded in Salem as a retired merchant owning real estate valued at $22,500 (equivalent to $572,862 in 2025) and was living with his wife and two sons, William and George, an unmarried sister, Eliza Messervy, and one female servant.

Messervy died on February 19, 1886, after a long and painful illness. One of his two sons, George Passarow Messervy, graduated from Harvard and became an admiralty lawyer. He retired to travel the world, and his book The Quick-Step of an Emperor: Maximilian of Mexico was published in London in 1921.

== Other resources ==
- William S. Messervy Collection (1791–1927), Museum of New Mexico Fray Angélico Chávez History Library, Santa Fe, New Mexico
- George P. Messervy, Biography of William Sluman Messervy, Messervy Manuscripts Collection
