= Stephen G. Wheatland =

American politician

Stephen Goodhue Wheatland

13th Mayor of Salem, Massachusetts
- In office 1863–1863
- Preceded by: Stephen Palfrey Webb
- Succeeded by: Joseph B. F. Osgood

Member of the Massachusetts House of Representatives from the Essex district
- In office 1862–1863

Personal details
- Born: August 11, 1824 Newton, Massachusetts
- Died: March 2, 1892 (aged 67) New York City
- Spouse: Ann Maria Pingree
- Education: Harvard, class of 1844.

Stephen Goodhue Wheatland (August 11, 1824 – March 2, 1892) was a Massachusetts lawyer and politician who served as a member of the Massachusetts House of Representatives, as a member, and President of the Common Council; and the Mayor of Salem, Massachusetts.

Wheatland attended Harvard where he was a member and librarian of the Porcellian Club, and a member of the Hasty Pudding Club.
