= Joseph B. F. Osgood =

American politician from Massachusetts (1823-1913)

Joseph Barlow Felt Osgood
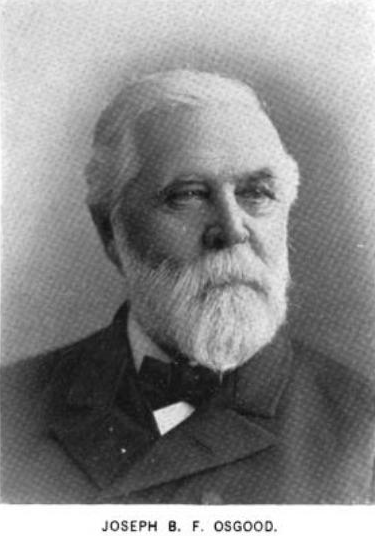

14th Mayor of Salem, Massachusetts
- In office 1865–1865
- Preceded by: Stephen G. Wheatland
- Succeeded by: David Roberts

Member of the Massachusetts House of Representatives from the Essex district
- In office January 2, 1850 – January 5, 1859

Member of the Massachusetts Senate from the Essex district
- In office January 5, 1859 – January 2, 1861

Personal details
- Born: July 1, 1823 Salem, Massachusetts, U.S.
- Died: January 8, 1913 (aged 89) Salem, Massachusetts, U.S.
- Political party: Republican
- Children: 2
- Education: Harvard University

Joseph Barlow Felt Osgood (July 1, 1823 – January 8, 1913) was an American politician who served as the 14th mayor of Salem, Massachusetts as a member of the Republican party in 1865.

== Early life ==
Osgood was born on July 1, 1823, in Salem, Massachusetts to Captain William Osgood (1785–1834) and Elizabeth Felt (1792–1864). He entered at Harvard in 1842 and graduated in 1846, after which he studied law. Osgood was admitted to the Massachusetts bar on July 25, 1849, and went on to practice law until he became a common council member from 1849 to 1853. He married Mary Jane Creamer (1827–1865) on November 23, 1853, in Salem and went on to have two daughters.

== Political career ==
Osgood was elected to the Massachusetts House of Representatives in 1850 and served in that role until 1859. That same year, Osgood was elected to the Massachusetts Senate and re-elected in 1860. Osgood received the Republican nomination for Mayor of Salem in December 1864, and was elected to the position the following year. He only served as Mayor until the end of 1865 and subsequently returned to his law practice. Osgood was appointed as justice of the first district court of Essex County by Governor Thomas Talbot in July 1874. He held the position until his resignation in January 1888, so he could return to private practice.

== Death ==
In his later years, Osgood suffered from Dementia and ultimately died of the disease on January 8, 1913, in Salem, Massachusetts. He was buried in Harmony Grove Cemetery on January 10, 1913.

Political offices
| Preceded by Stephen G. Wheatland | Mayor of Salem, Massachusetts; 1865 | Succeeded by David Roberts |
