= Michael J. Harrington =

American politician (born 1936)

Mike Harrington
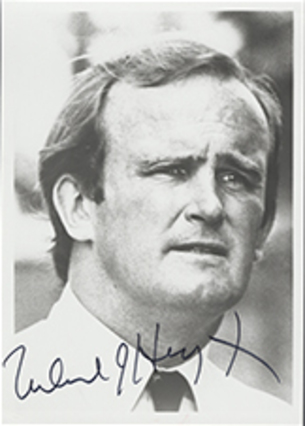

Member of the U.S. House of Representatives from Massachusetts's 6th district
- In office September 30, 1969 – January 3, 1979
- Preceded by: William H. Bates
- Succeeded by: Nicholas Mavroules

Member of the Massachusetts House of Representatives
- In office 1965–1969
- Preceded by: Thaddeus M. Buczko
- Succeeded by: Robert Ellis Cahill
- Constituency: 6th Essex district (1965–1969); 7th Essex district (1969)

Personal details
- Born: Michael Joseph Harrington; September 2, 1936 (age 90) Salem, Massachusetts, U.S.
- Party: Democratic
- Education: Harvard University (BA, LLB)

Michael Joseph Harrington (born September 2, 1936) is an American politician, lawyer and politician who served five terms as a U.S. representative from Massachusetts from 1969 to 1979.

== Life and career ==
Harrington is the son of former state senator, Salem mayor, and judge Joseph B. Harrington. Harrington graduated from St. John's Preparatory School, in Danvers, Massachusetts, in 1954, then earned a B.A. at Harvard University in 1958 and a J.D. at Harvard Law School in 1961.

=== Early political career ===
After serving on the Salem City Council from 1960 to 1963, Harrington was elected to the Massachusetts State Legislature in 1964, serving until 1969.

=== Congress ===
On September 30, 1969, he won a special election to fill the vacancy caused by the death of U.S. Representative William H. Bates. Harrington defeated Republican state Senator William L. Saltonstall with 52% of the vote. Running in opposition to the Vietnam War, he became the first Democrat to win the 6th Congressional district since 1875. He was subsequently re-elected to four full terms as a Congressman before retiring in 1978.

On July 8, 1975, Rep. Harrington called on House Speaker Carl Albert to convene the Democratic party committee to examine a secrecy system which he said has covered up "grotesque violations of the law" abroad by the CIA. At a news conference the Massachusetts Democrat also released three other letters countering efforts in the House to censure him for his role in surfacing the disclosure in 1974 that the CIA spent 11 million dollars (1974 dollars not inflation adjusted) to influence Chilean politics.

=== Retirement ===
Following his retirement from Congress, he became a real estate developer. After a brief run for the Democratic nomination for Massachusetts State Treasurer in 1990, Harrington was charged in 2000 for making false statements to financial institutions, banks, and the Federal Deposit Insurance Corporation. As a result, his law licence was suspended for three years and he was fined $100,000.

Harrington is a resident of Beverly, Massachusetts.

He is also a member of the ReFormers Caucus of Issue One.

== See also ==
- The Harrington family

== Footnotes ==
U.S. House of Representatives
Preceded by William H. Bates	Member of the U.S. House of Representatives from Massachusetts's 6th congressional district 1969–1979	Succeeded by Nicholas Mavroules
U.S. order of precedence (ceremonial)
Preceded by Rob Woodall as Former U.S. Representative	Order of precedence of the United States as Former U.S. Representative	Succeeded by Roy Dyson as Former U.S. Representative
