= Atkinson Academy =

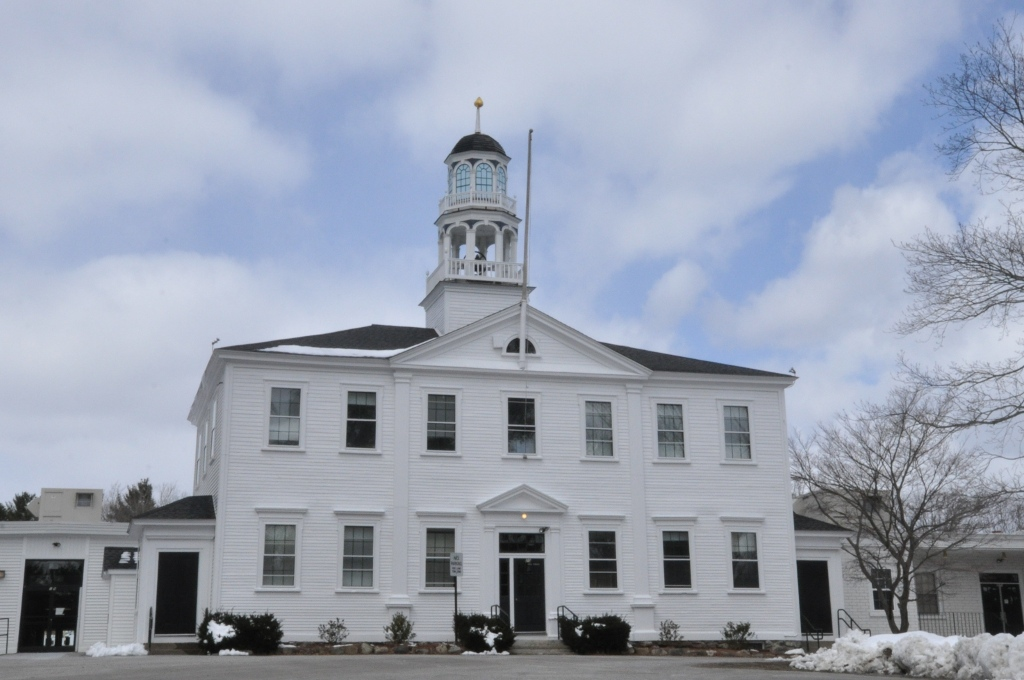
- The 1802 building

Location
- 17 Academy Avenue; Atkinson, New Hampshire; United States; 42°50′23″N 71°8′49″W

Information
- Type: Public
- Established: 1787
- Founder: William Cogswell, Stephen Peabody, Nathaniel Peabody
- School district: Timberlane Regional School District
- Principal: Stephen Harrises
- Faculty: 34.7 (on FTE basis)
- Grades: K to 5
- Enrollment: 480 (2007–08)
- Student to teacher ratio: 13.8:1
- Colours: Blue, Yellow
- Website: www.atkinsonacademy.com wp.timberlane.net/aa
- Atkinson Academy School
- U.S. National Register of Historic Places
- Location within New Hampshire Location within the United States
- Area: 1 acre (0.40 ha)
- Built: 1803
- Architect: Ebenezer Clifford
- NRHP reference No.: 80000297
- Added to NRHP: August 26, 1980

Atkinson Academy is a public elementary school at 17 Academy Avenue in Atkinson, New Hampshire. It is a part of the Timberlane Regional School District. Built in 1803, it is claimed to be the oldest standing co-educational school in the United States. It was listed on the National Register of Historic Places in 1980.

== Building ==
Atkinson Academy is located in the town of Atkinson's main village, on the north side of Academy Avenue between Woodlawn Avenue and Maple Avenue. The original main building is a large two-story wood-frame building, with a hip roof and clapboarded exterior. A tower with open octagonal belfry and cupola rises at the center of the roof. The main facade is seven bays wide, with the central three set apart by pilasters and a pedimented gable. The entrance is flanked on one side by a sidelight window, and both sides by pilasters, which rise to an entablature and pedimented gable. Modern wings extend to the rear of this building, giving the building a rough W shape.

== History ==
Atkinson Academy was founded in 1787 as an all-boys school by the Reverend Stephen Peabody, General Nathaniel Peabody, and Dr. William Cogswell. It began admitting girls in 1791. The original building, constructed in 1789, was destroyed by fire on November 15, 1802, and the present building was completed in 1803. It is a rare surviving work of Ebenezer Clifford, a prominent master builder of the southern New Hampshire during that period.

The unincorporated and uninhabited township of Atkinson and Gilmanton Academy Grant in northern New Hampshire is named in part for the academy, to which it was originally granted.

The academy, in 1874, was under the charge of B.H. Weston, A.M., and was one of the oldest and most respectable institutions in the state. The 1803 school building is listed on the National Register of Historic Places for its architecture.

== Notable alumni ==
- Jonathan Cilley, congressman from Maine
- William Cogswell, congressman from Massachusetts and colonel in the Union Army during the American Civil War
- Grace Fletcher Webster, the wife of Daniel Webster

== See also ==
- National Register of Historic Places listings in Rockingham County, New Hampshire
