= United States Customs District of Salem and Beverly =

USA administrative area

The United States Customs District of Salem and Beverly was an administrative area for the collection of import duties on foreign goods that entered the United States by ship at the ports of Salem and Beverly. Established in 1789, it was abolished in 1913. Today the ports of Salem and Beverly are serviced by the Port of Gloucester (located at the Cummings Center in Beverly), which is administered by the Boston Customs District.

== History ==
The District of Salem and Beverly was established in the fifth statute passed by the First Congress in 1789 (ch.5, 1 Stat. 30). This act provided for the collection of the duties that had been laid down in the Hamilton Tariff earlier that year. The towns of Salem and Beverly were designated as one port of entry for customs purposes. The towns of Danvers and Ipswich were designated as ports of delivery only. The district extended to all shores and waters within the towns of Ipswich, Beverly, Salem and Danvers. A collector, naval officer and surveyor were appointed to the district to reside at Salem, which was the location of the Customs House for the district. Surveyors were appointed to reside at each of the towns of Beverly and Ipswich. In 1790, Salem was the sixth largest city in the country and a major seaport.

In 1796, the district was reorganised, with Ipswich created as a district in its own right. Through the 19th century, Salem declined as a sea port, being seriously affected by the trade embargo with Great Britain. This fact was reflected in 1865, when the posts of surveyor at Beverly and naval officer at Salem were abolished, leaving the collector and surveyor at Salem as the only appointed officers.

The post of surveyor was abolished ten years later in 1875. A collector remained at Salem Custom House until 1913, when Salem lost its status as a separate district and became a port of entry only.

Nathaniel Hawthorne worked in the Custom House as surveyor for Salem from 1846–1849, and the introduction to his famous novel The Scarlet Letter is set there.

== Officers ==
The positions of collector, naval officer, and surveyor were appointed by the President, subject to confirmation by the Senate. From 1820 onwards, officers were limited to four-year commissions, at the end of which they needed to be reappointed by the President. They could be removed from office at the pleasure of the President. From approximately the 1840s onwards, the various posts were seen as a method of rewarding supporters and punishing those of the opposite view by successive administrations. Often, a change of administration led to a change in the Customs House. Other posts, such as deputy collector, inspectors, weighers, measurers and gaugers were recommended by the collector, pending approval by the Secretary of the Treasury. This led to a certain amount of nepotism.

=== Collector for the District (1789–1913) ===
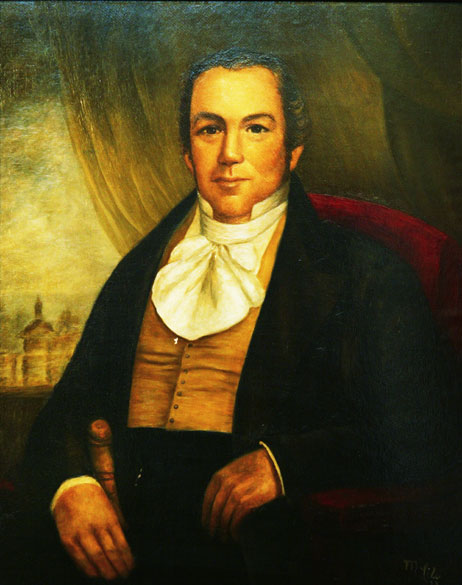
James Miller, Collector 1824 - 1849

The first collector at the port of Salem following the American Revolution was Warwick Palfray. In 1784 he was succeeded by Joseph Hiller and when the collection of import duties was organised on a federal basis in 1789, Hiller was appointed collector. He had been an officer during the Revolution, as had his successor, William R. Lee. When Lee died in office, he was replaced by another soldier, James Miller. Miller was probably the most notable of the collectors to serve in Salem. He was a hero of the War of 1812, where he was made a general following his actions at the Battle of Lundy's Lane. He was a governor of the Arkansas Territory before being elected to Congress in 1824 for New Hampshire. However, he never took up his seat, being appointed instead collector for Salem. He served as collector for over 24 years, the longest term of any collector, before being replaced by his son.

Collectors in Salem were not removed from office as frequently as the other officers, they generally only being replaced when their commissions expired. Charles Henry Odell was the longest serving collector after 1849, with 12 years and the last collector, David M. Little, served for nearly ten years before the office was abolished in 1913.

Name	Entered office (Note: From 1820, collectors were appointed to four-year commission. The term of a collector may have expired for a short period before the new collector was confirmed, but the dates are shown as continuous.)	Left office	First Appointed By	Reason for Leaving Office
Joseph Hiller	August 4, 1789	January 17, 1803	George Washington	Retired
William R. Lee	January 17, 1803 (Note: Recess appointment. The date of taking up office is the date the recess appointment was made by the President, unless otherwise noted.)	October 26, 1824	Thomas Jefferson	Died in office
None	October 26, 1824	December 6, 1824	Office Vacant	-
James Miller	December 6, 1824	January 3, 1849	James Monroe	Commission expired
Ephraim F. Miller (Note: Ephraim F. Miller was the son of the previous collector.)	January 3, 1849	January 26, 1857	James K. Polk	Commission expired
William B. Pike	January 26, 1857	January 26, 1861	Franklin Pierce	Commission expired
None (Note: Pike was renominated for another term by James Buchanan but never confirmed. Phillips was nominated instead by Lincoln.)	January 26, 1861	March 14, 1861	Office Vacant	-
Willard B. Phillips	March 14, 1861	January 12, 1865	Abraham Lincoln	Resigned
Robert S. Rantoul	January 12, 1865	January 12, 1869	Abraham Lincoln	Commission expired
Charles W. Palfray	January 12, 1869	March 20, 1873	Ulysses S. Grant (Note: Palfrey was nominated by Johnson, but confirmed under Grant.)	Commission expired
Charles Henry Odell	March 20, 1873	May 13, 1885	Ulysses S. Grant	Commission expired
Richard F. Dodge	May 13, 1885	June 13, 1889	Grover Cleveland	Commission expired
Guilford Parker Bray	June 13, 1889	January 30, 1894	Benjamin Harrison	Commission expired
William C. Waters	January 30, 1894	March 18, 1898	Chester A. Arthur	Commission expired
John Daland	March 18, 1898	November 10, 1903	William McKinley	Resigned
David M. Little	November 10, 1903	June 30, 1913	Theodore Roosevelt	Office abolished

=== Naval Officer for the District (1789–1865) ===
The naval officer for a customs district operated as an auditor, and kept a separate record of the various transactions in the district. The most notable name associated with this office in Salem was one who never actually took up the post, Associate Supreme Court Justice Joseph Story. In 1803, Story was nominated by President Jefferson and confirmed by the Senate for the post, but he declined the appointment upon being convinced that the role would conflict with his then growing private law practice in Salem.

Name	Entered office	Left office	First Appointed By	Reason for Leaving Office
William Pickman	August 3, 1789	February 4, 1803	George Washington	Removed by Jefferson
None (Note: Joseph Story was nominated by Jefferson and confirmed by the Senate on March 1, 1803. However, he declined the office.)	February 4, 1803	November 18, 1803	Office Vacant	-
Samuel Ward	November 18, 1803	July 31, 1812	Thomas Jefferson	Died in office
None	July 31, 1812	November 4, 1812	Office Vacant	-
Henry Elkins	November 4, 1812	August 3, 1829	James Madison	Removed by Jackson
John Swasey	August 3, 1829	April 12, 1842	Andrew Jackson	Commission expired
Abraham True	April 12, 1842	April 12, 1846	John Tyler	Commission expired
John D. Howard	April 12, 1846	July 20, 1849	James K. Polk	Removed by Fillmore
William Brown	July 20, 1849	October 7, 1853	Millard Fillmore	Removed by Pierce
Charles Millett	October 7, 1853	January 31, 1858	Franklin Pierce	Commission expired
None	January 31, 1858	June 3, 1858	Office Vacant	-
John Ryan	June 3, 1858	August 3, 1860	James Buchanan	Resigned
None (Note: Charles F. Williams was nominated by James Buchanan on February 23, 1861. However, he was not confirmed before the 36th Congress ended. Upon becoming President, Lincoln nominated Dalton instead.)	August 3, 1860	March 27, 1861	Office Vacant	-
Joseph A. Dalton	March 27, 1861	February 28, 1865	Abraham Lincoln	Office abolished

=== Surveyor of Salem (1789–1875) ===
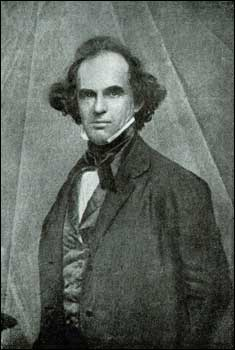
Nathaniel Hawthorne in 1848, when he was surveyor of the district

The writer Nathaniel Hawthorne is undoubtedly the most famous name associated with Salem customs, and he served as surveyor from 1846 to 1849. However he was just one of a remarkable seven consecutive surveyors who were removed from the post by the President between 1841 and 1861. Every incoming President, it seems, felt the need to put his own man in the post. One of these removals led to the only time the nomination of a customs officer for Salem was rejected by the Senate.

Edward Palfray had been surveyor in 1841 before being replaced by Stephen Daniels. When Daniels himself was removed two years later Palfray was appointed his successor by President Tyler as a recess appointment. However, when Palfray's name came before the Senate for confirmation, his appointment was rejected by a Senate vote, 12 - 23. George W. Mullet was then nominated by Tyler, but he too was rejected, 16 - 25. Finally, Nehemiah Brown was confirmed. Palfray still held the office during this time though, as recess appointments stay in place until a nomination is confirmed or until the end of the Congressional session, whichever comes first.

Name	Entered office	Left office	First Appointed By	Reason for Leaving Office
Bartholomew Putnam	August 3, 1789	April 4, 1808	George Washington	Resigned
George Hodges	April 4, 1808	1817	Thomas Jefferson	Resigned
None	1817	February 3, 1818	Office Vacant	-
John Saunders	February 3, 1818	January 29, 1830	James Monroe	Commission expired
James Dalrymple	January 29, 1830	January 29, 1834	Andrew Jackson	Commission expired
Joseph Noble	January 29, 1834	January 29, 1838	Andrew Jackson	Commission expired
Edward Palfrey	January 29, 1838	July 6, 1841	Martin van Buren	Removed by Tyler
Stephen Daniels	July 6, 1841	June 19, 1843	John Tyler	Removed by Tyler
Edward Palfrey	June 19, 1843	June 14, 1844	John Tyler	Senate did not confirm recess appointment
Nehemiah Brown	June 14, 1844	March 18, 1846	John Tyler	Removed by Polk
Nathaniel Hawthorne	March 18, 1846	June 17, 1849	James K. Polk	Removed by Taylor
Allen Putnam	June 17, 1849	May 30, 1853	Zachary Taylor	Removed by Pierce
Lewis Josselyn	May 30, 1853	July 23, 1857	Franklin Pierce	Removed by Buchanan
Ebenezer Dodge	July 23, 1857	August 1, 1861	James Buchanan	Removed by Lincoln
William C. Waters	August 1, 1861	March 23, 1863	Abraham Lincoln	Resigned
Charles F. Williams	March 23, 1863	June 4, 1865	Abraham Lincoln	Died in office
None	June 4, 1865	July 28, 1865	Office Vacant	-
Joseph Mosely	July 28, 1865	February 23, 1870	Andrew Johnson	Commission expired
Charles D. Howard	February 23, 1870	1875	Ulysses S. Grant	Office abolished

=== Surveyor of Beverly (1789–1865) ===
The surveyor of Beverly was based in the port of Beverly, separate from the rest of the customs officers in Salem. The longest serving surveyor was the first, Josiah Batchelor, who served for 20 years. The most interesting case was that of Samuel D. Turner. He was appointed surveyor in April 1842, but was removed from the position later that year as he "did not qualify".

Name	Entered office	Left office	First Appointed By	Reason for Leaving Office
Josiah Batchelor	August 3, 1789	1809	George Washington	???
None (Note: John Burley was nominated by Madison and confirmed by the Senate on January 2, 1810. He declined the appointment.)	1809	May 1, 1810	Office Vacant	-
Jonathan Smith	May 1, 1810	January 29, 1830	James Madison	Commission expired
Benjamin Hawkes	January 29, 1830	January 29, 1834 (Note: Hawkes declined reappointment.)	Andrew Jackson	Commission expired
None	January 29, 1834	March 15, 1834	Office Vacant	-
Aaron Forster	March 15, 1834	April 1, 1842	Andrew Jackson	Commission expired
Samuel D. Turner	April 1, 1842	September 19, 1842	John Tyler	Turner 'did not qualify'
Daniel Foster	September 19, 1842	March 3, 1851	John Tyler	Commission expired
Robert Goodwin	March 3, 1851	May 27, 1853	Millard Fillmore	Removed by Pierce
Samuel Porter	May 27, 1853	June 3, 1862	Franklin Pierce	Commission expired
None (Note: William W. Hinkley was nominated by Lincoln and confirmed by the Senate on July 17, 1862. He declined the appointment.)	June 3, 1862	1862	Office Vacant	-
Samuel Porter	1862	February 28, 1865	Abraham Lincoln	Office abolished

=== Surveyor of Ipswich (1789 - 1796) ===
The surveyor of Ipswich was part of the Salem and Beverly district until 1796, when Ipswich was created as a district in its own right.

Name	Entered office	Left office	First Appointed By	Reason for Leaving Office
Jeremiah Stainiford	August 3, 1789	May 27, 1796	George Washington	Office abolished
