= David M. Little =

American businessman and politician

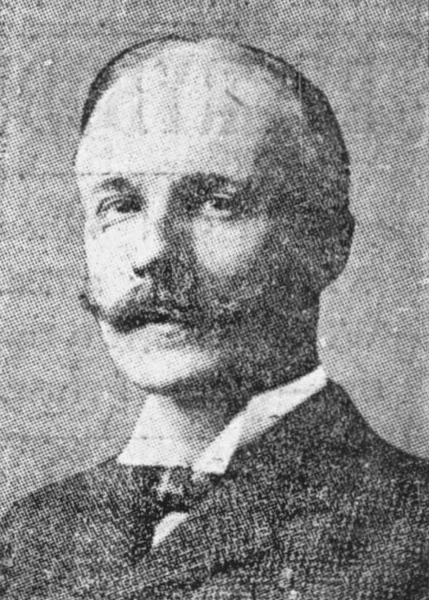

Collector of Customs the Salem and Beverly District
- In office 1903–1913
- Preceded by: John Daland
- Succeeded by: District eliminated

Mayor of Salem, Massachusetts
- In office 1900–1900
- Preceded by: James H. Turner
- Succeeded by: John F. Hurley

Personal details
- Born: 1860 Swampscott, Massachusetts
- Died: February 6, 1923 (aged 63) Boston
- Party: Republican
- Education: Massachusetts Institute of Technology
- Occupation: Shipbuilder; Automobile manufacturer

David Mason Little (1860 – February 6, 1923) was an American businessman and politician from Salem, Massachusetts

== Early life and education ==
Little was born in Swampscott, Massachusetts, in 1860. His father, James L. Little, was the agent for the Pacific Mills in Lawrence, Massachusetts, for 20 years. Little attended the Hopkinton School and graduated from the Massachusetts Institute of Technology in 1879.

== Business career ==
=== Photography ===
Little was involved during the early years of instantaneous photography. He spent six years with the Forbes Lithograph Company. He made his own dry plates and patented a photographic shutter. In 1880, Little became the first American to take pictures of vessels in motion. He had a collection of 800 negatives of marine subjects and published a book of marine studies that included his own photos.

=== Shipbuilding ===
In 1889, Little went to Europe to study naval architecture. He returned to the United States in 1891 and purchased a shop in Salem, Massachusetts. The first ship produced at the shop was a 65-foot steam yacht, Eleanor, built for his personal use. That same year he designed and constructed a 70-foot steam yacht for Charles Goddard Weld. In 1898 constructed a new shop on the same site.

=== Automobiles ===
In 1900, Little began building automobiles. From 1900 to 1903 he manufactured the "Little Steamer". He also built a steam truck that was capable of reaching a speed of 35 miles per hour.

== War service ==
During the Spanish–American War, Little served as the quartermaster of the 2nd corps of cadets. He was appointed an ordnance officer by Governor Roger Wolcott and was responsible for the distribution of all of Massachusetts' guns and ammunition.

During World War I, Little entered the naval service as a lieutenant. He was quickly promoted to lieutenant commander and assigned to the Charlestown Navy Yard as a construction officer. Little also served a chairman of the Salem Public Safety Committee.

== Political career ==
In 1896, Little was elected to replace the deceased Daniel B. Hagar on the Salem School Committee. In 1898 he served on the board of aldermen. He returned to the school committee in 1899. In 1900 he served as the mayor of Salem. During his tenure, the city's bond debt was reduced by $60,000 and the tax rate was reduced by 60 cents per thousand. He also assisted in street paving by running a road roller. He operated the machine for 20 minutes because he wanted to see how it worked.

On November 10, 1903, Little was nominated for the position of Collector of Customs for the Salem and Beverly District. He held this position until the district was eliminated on July 1, 1913.

== Death ==
Little died on February 6, 1923, at Massachusetts General Hospital's Phillips House due to complications from surgery.
