= Edward A. Coffey =

American politician (1892–1972)

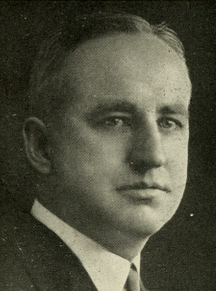
- Coffey as a member of the Massachusetts House of Representatives

Mayor of Salem, Massachusetts
- In office 1938–1947
- Preceded by: George J. Bates
- Succeeded by: Joseph B. Harrington

Member of the Massachusetts House of Representatives for the 13th Essex district
- In office 1935–1938
- Preceded by: Felix Irzyk
- Succeeded by: J. Elmer Callahan

Personal details
- Born: October 17, 1892 Salem, Massachusetts, U.S.
- Died: April 18, 1972 (aged 79) Salem, Massachusetts, U.S.
- Party: Republican
- Education: Boston College; Harvard Law School

Edward A. Coffey (October 17, 1892 – April 18, 1972) was an American politician who was a member of the Massachusetts House of Representatives from 1935 to 1938 and mayor of Salem, Massachusetts from 1938 to 1947.

== Early life ==
Coffey was born in Salem on October 17, 1892. He graduated from St. John's Preparatory School, Boston College, and Harvard Law School.

== Politics ==
Coffey was a Salem city councilor from 1931 to 1932. In 1934, he was elected to represent the 13th Essex district in the Massachusetts House of Representatives.

In 1937, Coffey beat his nearest opponent by a 2–1 margin to become mayor of Salem. He continued to serve in the House until the end of his term, following a precedent set by his predecessor, George J. Bates, who continued to serve as Mayor after he was elected to the United States House of Representatives. Coffey was reelected without opposition in 1939, 1943, and 1945 and beat state representative James F. Tobin by a wide martin in 1941. In 1947, he finished third in a three-candidate race behind Joseph B. Harrington and Philip L. Morency.

Coffey planned to run for the Massachusetts's 6th congressional district seat following Bates' death in 1950, but withdrew in favor of his son, William H. Bates.

== Death ==
Coffee died on April 18, 1972 at his home in Salem.
