= Henry K. Oliver =

American politician

Henry Kemble Oliver
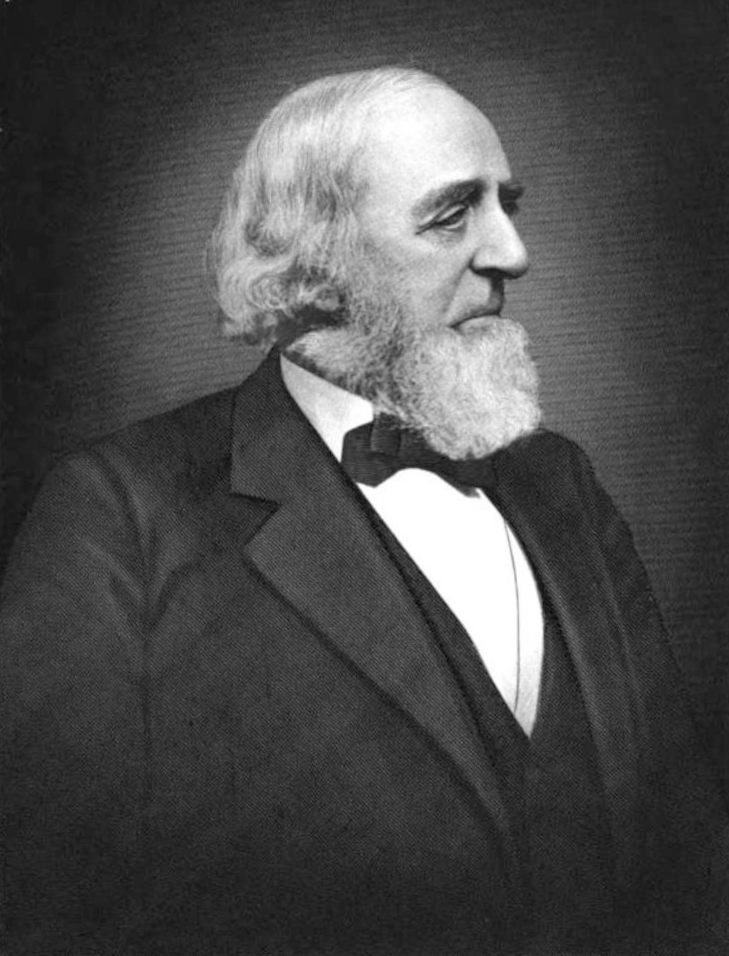

21st Mayor of Salem, Massachusetts
- In office 1877–1880
- Preceded by: Henry L. Williams
- Succeeded by: Samuel Calley
- Majority: 297

26th Massachusetts Treasurer
- In office 1861–1866
- Preceded by: Moses Tenney, Jr.
- Succeeded by: Jacob Loud

5th Mayor of Lawrence, Massachusetts
- In office 1859–1859
- Preceded by: John R. Rollins
- Succeeded by: Daniel Saunders, Jr.

Member of the Massachusetts House of Representatives
- In office 1859–1859

Superintendent of Schools of Lawrence, Massachusetts
- In office 1857–1859
- Preceded by: A. Williams
- Succeeded by: George Packard

Member of the Massachusetts Constitutional Convention of 1853
- In office 1853–1853

Personal details
- Born: Thomas Henry Oliver; November 24, 1800 Beverly, Massachusetts, U.S.
- Died: August 12, 1885 (aged 84) Salem, Massachusetts, U.S.
- Party: Republican
- Spouse: Sally Cook (m. 1825)
- Children: Samuel Cook Oliver; Henry Kemble Oliver
- Education: Dartmouth College, Harvard
- Profession: Teacher, cotton merchant

Henry Kemble Oliver (November 24, 1800 – August 12, 1885) was an American who served as the 5th Mayor of Lawrence, Massachusetts, the 21st Mayor of Salem, Massachusetts as a member of the Massachusetts House of Representatives, the Adjutant General of Massachusetts, and as the 26th Treasurer of Massachusetts. He was also a composer of hymns, having written the much-anthologized "Federal Street" tune and "Morning," both published in editions of The Sacred Harp.

== Early life ==
Oliver was born to Daniel and Elizabeth (Kemble) Oliver on November 24, 1800, in North Beverly, Massachusetts. Originally named Thomas Henry, Oliver's name was changed, by the legislature, in 1821 to that of his mother's brother who had died in 1802.

Oliver entered Phillips Academy, Andover in 1811 and Harvard College in the fall of 1814, however because Harvard was becoming overly Unitarian in its views and also more expensive, Oliver left Harvard after his sophomore year and transferred to Dartmouth College entering Dartmouth's Junior class in the fall of 1816. Oliver graduated from Dartmouth College. Oliver also received a degree Ad eundem from Harvard. At the age of 25, in 1825, Oliver joined the Unitarian church. The same year, he married Sally Cook, and they had seven children.

In 1844 Oliver was appointed the Adjutant General of Massachusetts by Governor George N. Briggs.

Beyond his political career, Oliver was a musician, singing bass, playing organ at several churches, and composing. Earlier in life, he had also played the bass, bassoon, and flute. His original hymn tunes include "Harmony Grove," "Merton," and "Saxony." His music was popular: The Sacred Harp's 1911 edition reports of his most popular work, "'Federal Street' was rendered under his leadership at the Peace Jubilee 1872 by 20,000 singers in Boston. The audience of 40,000 singers joining with them." He received honorary degrees from Harvard (AB and AM) in 1862 and from Dartmouth (MusD) in 1883.

He died at his home in Salem on August 12, 1885.

Political offices
Preceded by Moses Tenney, Jr	26th Massachusetts Treasurer; 1861–1866	Succeeded by Jacob Loud
Preceded by Henry Laurens Williams	21st Mayor of Salem, Massachusetts; 1877–1880	Succeeded by Samuel Calley
Preceded by John R. Rollins	5th Mayor of Lawrence, Massachusetts; 1859-1859	Succeeded by Daniel Saunders, Jr.
