= Samuel Calley =

American politician

18th and 22nd Mayor of Salem, Massachusetts
- In office 1872–1872
- Preceded by: Nathanial Brown
- Succeeded by: William Cogswell
- In office 1881–1882
- Preceded by: Henry K. Oliver
- Succeeded by: William M. Hill

Member of the Massachusetts House of Representatives
- In office 1870–1871

Personal details
- Born: April 13, 1821 Salem, Massachusetts
- Died: January 1, 1883 (aged 61)
- Party: Republican
- Profession: House Painter

Samuel Calley (April 13, 1821 – January 1, 1883) was a Massachusetts house painter and politician who served as the eighteenth and twenty second Mayor of Salem, Massachusetts, and in the Massachusetts House of Representatives from 1870 to 1871.

== Death ==
Calley killed himself by hanging from a step ladder.

Political offices
Preceded by Nathanial Brown	18th Mayor of Salem, Massachusetts; 1872–1872	Succeeded by William Cogswell
Preceded by Henry K. Oliver	21st Mayor of Salem, Massachusetts; 1881–1882	Succeeded by William M. Hill
