= Thomas G. Pinnock =

American politician (1851–1914)

Thomas Goodwin Pinnock

33rd Mayor of Salem, Massachusetts
- In office 1906–1907
- Preceded by: Joseph N. Peterson
- Succeeded by: John F. Hurley

Member of the Salem, Massachusetts Board of Aldermen
- In office 1899–1900

Personal details
- Born: November 1, 1851 Lowell, Massachusetts
- Died: February 16, 1914 (aged 62) Salem, Massachusetts
- Party: Republican
- Spouse(s): Emma Augusta Littlefield, m. January 18, 1878
- Children: Harold Pinnock, Anson Pinnock, Thomas Wellington Pinnock, Lorna Pinnock

Thomas Goodwin Pinnock (November 1, 1851 – February 16, 1914) was a Massachusetts politician who served as the 33rd Mayor of Salem, Massachusetts, United States.

== Early life ==
Pinnock, was born in Lowell, Massachusetts to Thomas and Ann (Lewis) Pinnock, on November 1, 1851. Pinnock moved to Salem, Massachusetts when he was six years old.

== Family life ==
Pinnock married Emma Augusta Littlefield, on January 18, 1878, they had four children, Harold Pinnock, Anson Pinnock, Thomas Wellington Pinnock, Lorna Pinnock.

== Footnotes ==
Political offices
Preceded by Joseph N. Peterson	33rd Mayor of Salem, Massachusetts; 1906–1907	Succeeded by John F. Hurley
