= Moses Tenney Jr. =

American politician

Moses Tenney, Jr.

25th Massachusetts Treasurer
- In office 1856–1861
- Preceded by: Thomas J. Marsh
- Succeeded by: Henry K. Oliver

Massachusetts Senate Essex District
- In office 1855–1855

Personal details
- Born: June 18, 1808 Newbury, Massachusetts
- Died: January 7, 1903.
- Party: Know Nothing
- Spouse: Mary Ann Northend

Moses Tenney, Jr. (June 18, 1808 – January 7, 1903) was an American politician who served as Treasurer of Massachusetts.

== Early life ==
Tenney was born in Newbury, Massachusetts to Moses and Hannah (Whitaker) Tenney,

== Family life ==
Tenney married Mary Ann Northend on April 6, 1831, they had five children, she died on May 18, 1888. They lived in Georgetown, Massachusetts.

== Massachusetts State Senate ==
Tenney was elected to the Massachusetts Senate for the Essex District in 1854, serving for the year 1855, on the committee of railroads and canals.

== State treasurer ==
Tenney was elected state treasurer in 1855, and subsequently re elected to four more one year terms.

== Death ==
Tenney died on January 7, 1903.

=== Bibliography ===
- Massachusetts General Court "Acts and Resolves Passed by the General Court of Massachusetts in the Year 1855", page 1056 (1855).
- Tenney, Martha Jane, The Tenney Family, or, the Descendants of Thomas Tenney, of Rowley, Massachusetts, 1638–1890, page 210 (1891).
- Tenney, Martha Jane, The Tenney Family, or, the Descendants of Thomas Tenney, of Rowley, Massachusetts, 1638–1890, pages 350–351(1904).

Political offices
Preceded by Thomas J. Marsh	Massachusetts Treasurer; 1856–1861	Succeeded by Henry K. Oliver
