= William H. Bates =

American politician (1917–1969)

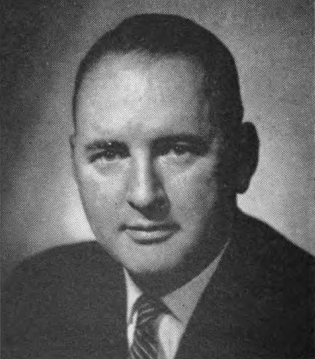

Member of the U.S. House of Representatives from Massachusetts's 6th district
- In office February 14, 1950 – June 22, 1969
- Preceded by: George J. Bates
- Succeeded by: Michael J. Harrington

Personal details
- Born: William Henry Bates; April 26, 1917 Salem, Massachusetts, U.S.
- Died: June 22, 1969 (aged 52) Bethesda, Maryland, U.S.
- Party: Republican
- Relations: John Mulaney (great nephew)
- Education: Brown University, 1940, Harvard Graduate School of Business Administration, 1947

Military service
- Allegiance: United States
- Branch/service: United States Navy
- Rank: Ensign
- Battles/wars: World War II *Iwo Jima campaign

William Henry Bates (April 26, 1917 – June 22, 1969) was a member of the United States House of Representatives from Massachusetts from 1950 to 1969. He was most notable for his staunch support of the United States Navy.

== Life and career ==
Bates was born in Salem, Massachusetts, the son of Nora (Jennings) and Representative George J. Bates of the 6th Massachusetts Congressional District, who also served as Salem's mayor. He attended local schools and graduated from Worcester Academy in 1936. He received his undergraduate education at Brown University, Providence, R.I., graduating in 1940.

=== Military service ===
Following graduation from Brown, he enlisted in the United States Navy in July 1940 and was commissioned as ensign in the Naval Reserve on January 30, 1941. Bates then received instruction at the Naval Reserve Supply Officer's School at the Naval Medical Center, Washington, D.C., before serving successive tours of duty at the Washington Navy Yard and in Constellation (IX-20).

He remained a naval reservist, and by 1949 had become the supply officer for the 4th Naval District. While Bates was stationed there, his father was killed in a plane crash at the Washington National Airport on November 1, 1949.

=== Congress ===
Bates resigned his reserve commission — he had attained the rank of lieutenant commander by that time — on February 14, 1950, to fill the seat of his late father in the United States House of Representatives. For nearly two decades, until his death in 1969, Bates staunchly advocated a strong military posture for the United States. On the Joint Congressional Committee on Atomic Energy and the House Armed Services Committee, he vigorously supported the development of nuclear-powered naval vessels. He also vigorously backed incentive pay programs and the establishment of better housing facilities for servicemen. He constantly sought means to enhance the training, caliber, and morale of military personnel. Bates voted in favor of the Civil Rights Acts of 1957, 1960, 1964, and 1968, as well as the 24th Amendment to the U.S. Constitution and the Voting Rights Act of 1965.

=== Death and legacy ===
Bates died of stomach cancer on June 22, 1969. Immediately upon his death, the U.S. Navy attack submarine USS William H. Bates (SSN-680), originally planned to be named USS Redfish, was renamed in his honor before her construction began.

The Bates Bridge, which crosses the Merrimack River between Groveland and Haverhill, Massachusetts, is named in his honor.

His great-nephew is comedian John Mulaney, whose maternal grandmother is Bates' sister.

== See also ==
- List of members of the United States Congress who died in office (1950–1999)

U.S. House of Representatives
Preceded by George J. Bates	Member of the U.S. House of Representatives from Massachusetts's 6th congressional district February 14, 1950 - June 22, 1969	Succeeded by Michael J. Harrington
