= Denis J. Sullivan =

American politician (1889–1943)

Member of the Massachusetts House of Representatives
- In office 1929–1930
- Preceded by: Richard D. Seamans
- Succeeded by: Felix Irzyk
- Constituency: 13th Essex district

Mayor of Salem, Massachusetts
- In office 1918–1924
- Preceded by: Henry P. Benson
- Succeeded by: George J. Bates

Member of the Massachusetts House of Representatives
- In office 1915–1917
- Preceded by: Thomas A. Henry
- Succeeded by: George J. Bates
- Constituency: 19th Essex district (1915–1916); 18th Essex district (1917)

Personal details
- Born: July 24, 1889 Peabody, Massachusetts, U.S.
- Died: September 1, 1943 (aged 54) Salem, Massachusetts, U.S.
- Party: Democratic

Denis J. Sullivan (July 24, 1889 – September 1, 1943) was an American politician who was a member of the Massachusetts House of Representatives from 1915 to 1917 and 1929 to 1930 and mayor of Salem, Massachusetts from 1918 to 1923.

== Early life ==
Sullivan was born in Peabody, Massachusetts on July 24, 1889. He graduated from Salem High School, where he was a standout athlete.

== Politics ==
From 1915 to 1917, Sullivan was a member of the Massachusetts House of Representatives. In 1917, he was elected mayor of Salem. At 29, he was the youngest mayor in the city's history. He was reelected in 1919 and 1921, but was defeated in 1923 by state representative George J. Bates 8,489 votes to 3,663. Bates' majority of 4,826 votes was a new record. Sullivan was an unsuccessful candidate for the Massachusetts House of Representatives in 1926 and mayor in 1927 and 1929. Sullivan returned to the Massachusetts House of Representatives in 1929 as the representative for the 13th Essex district but was defeated for renomination in 1930 by Felix Irzyk.
