= Stephen Palfrey Webb =

American politician (1804-1879)

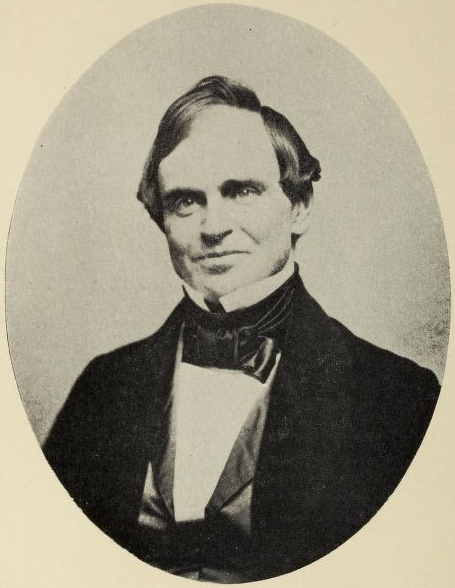

12th Mayor of Salem, Massachusetts
- In office 1860–1862
- Preceded by: Nathaniel Silsbee Jr.
- Succeeded by: Stephen G. Wheatland

5th Mayor of San Francisco
- In office October 2, 1854 – June 30, 1855
- Preceded by: Cornelius Kingsland Garrison
- Succeeded by: James Van Ness

3rd Mayor of Salem, Massachusetts
- In office 1842–1845
- Preceded by: Stephen C. Phillips
- Succeeded by: Joseph S. Cabot

Personal details
- Born: March 20, 1804 Salem, Massachusetts
- Died: September 29, 1879 (aged 75) Salem, Massachusetts
- Party: Whig; Republican
- Spouse(s): Hannah Hunt Beckford Robinson, June 9, 1805
- Education: Harvard

Stephen Palfrey Webb (March 20, 1804 – September 29, 1879) was an American politician who served as the third and twelfth mayor of Salem, Massachusetts, and the 5th mayor of San Francisco, California.

== Early life and education ==
Stephen Palfrey Webb was born to Captain Stephen Webb and Sara Putnam Palfrey Webb in Salem, Massachusetts on March 20, 1804. Webb graduated from Harvard College in 1824 and studied law with John Glen King.

== Career ==
Webb was admitted to the Essex County Bar in 1826 and began his practice of law in Salem.

Webb served in the Massachusetts House of Representatives and the Massachusetts Senate. He was elected mayor of Salem, Massachusetts in 1842, 1843, and 1844. Webb was also Treasurer and Clerk of the Essex Railroad in 1849.

Webb moved to San Francisco in approximately 1853 and was elected mayor for a single term with backing from the Know Nothing movement in 1854. He prepared a report about the vigilance committees in 1874 entitled A Sketch of the Causes, Operations and Results of the San Francisco Vigilance Committee in 1856.

Webb returned to Salem and was again elected mayor in 1860, 1861, and 1862, and served as City Clerk from 1863 to 1870. He then retired to Brookline, Massachusetts.

== Personal life ==
On May 26, 1834, Webb married Hannah Hunt Beckford Robinson. They had one daughter, Caroline B. Webb, in about 1846. Webb died in Brookline, Massachusetts on September 29, 1879.
