= Robert S. Rantoul =

American politician (1832–1922)

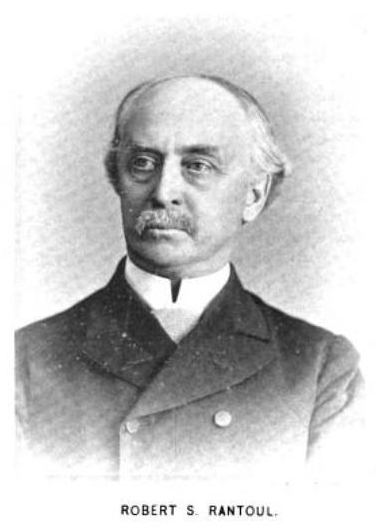

Mayor of Salem, Massachusetts
- In office 1890–1892
- Preceded by: John M. Raymond
- Succeeded by: James H. Turner

Collector of Customs the Salem and Beverly District
- In office 1865–1869
- Preceded by: Willard B. Phillips
- Succeeded by: Charles W. Palfray

Personal details
- Born: June 2, 1832 Beverly, Massachusetts
- Died: May 1, 1922 (aged 89) Beverly, Massachusetts
- Party: Democratic (1853–1861); Republican (1861–1888); Democratic (1888–1922)
- Education: Harvard Law School
- Occupation: Lawyer

Robert S. Rantoul (June 2, 1832 – May 1, 1922) was an American politician from Salem, Massachusetts.

== Early life ==
Rantoul was born on June 2, 1832, in Beverly, Massachusetts. His father, Robert Rantoul Jr., was a member of the United States Senate. Rantoul attended the Beverly Academy and Harvard College. After graduating from Harvard Law School he worked in the office of Charles G. Loring. In 1853, Rantoul began a law practice in Salem. In addition to law, Rantoul was an editorial writer for the Boston Transcript.

== Politics ==
In 1858, Rantoul served in the Massachusetts House of Representatives. He supported going to war against the Confederate States of America in order to preserve the union. During the United States Civil War, Rantoul joined the Republican Party. In 1865, President Abraham Lincoln appointed Rantoul Collector of Customs the Salem and Beverly District. In 1884 and 1885 he again served in the Massachusetts House of Representatives. In 1888, Rantoul served as a member of the Salem Board of Aldermen. That same year, Rantoul left the Republican Party in order to support Grover Cleveland for the Presidency. From 1890 to 1892, he served as Mayor of Salem. Rantoul also served a legal counsel for a group of Salem citizens that fought for a community water supply.

== Personal life and death ==
In 1858, Rantoul married Harriet C. Neal, daughter of Eastern Railroad president Daniel A. Neal. The couple had ten children.

Rantoul died on May 1, 1922, at his summer home in Beverly Farms.
