= Atkinson, New Hampshire =

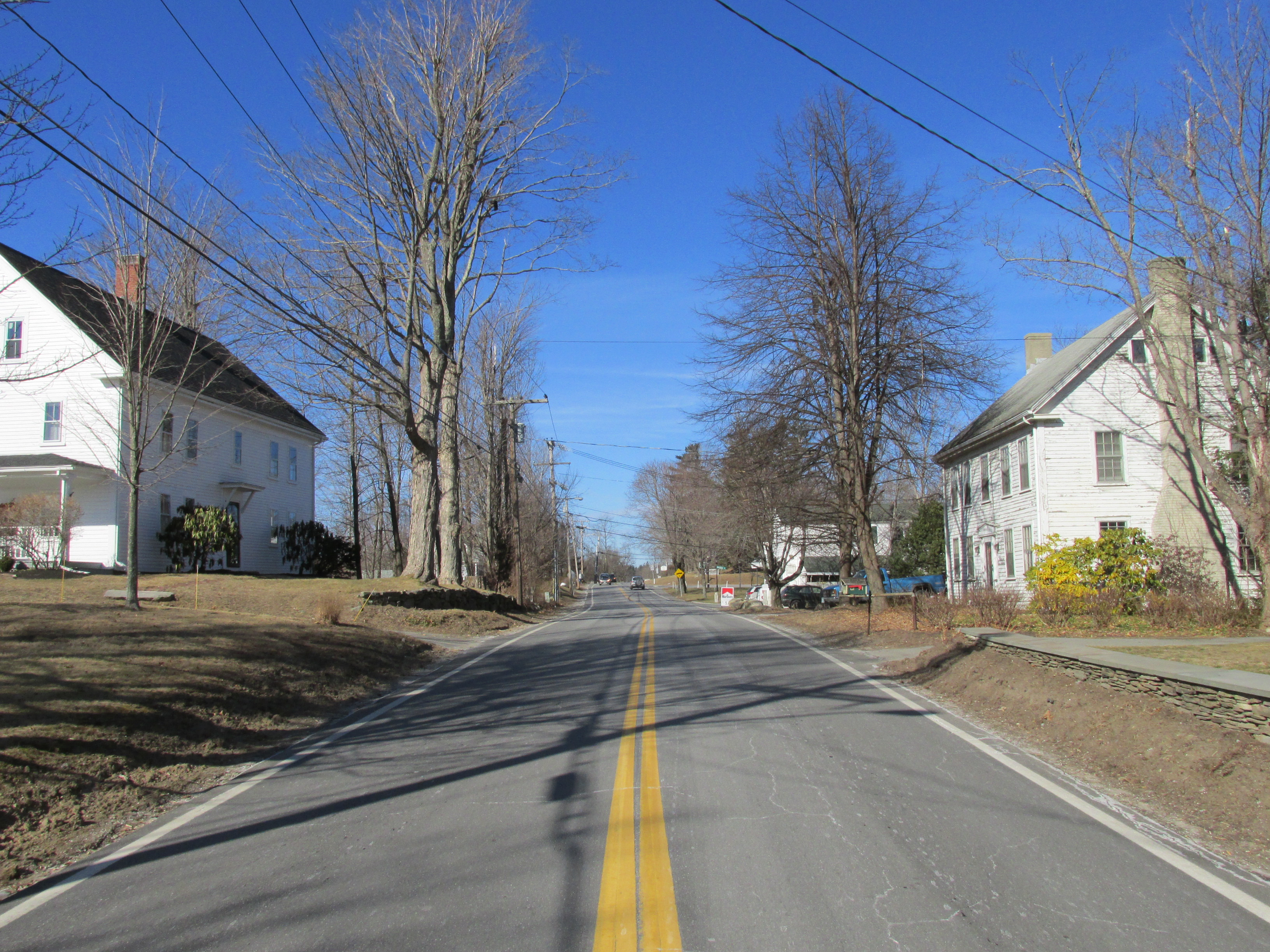
- Main Street

- Seal

- Location in Rockingham County and the state of New Hampshire.
- Coordinates: 42°50′18″N 71°08′49″W
- Country: United States
- State: New Hampshire
- County: Rockingham
- Incorporated: 1767

Government
  - Type: SB2

Area
  - Total: 11.4 sq mi (29.4 km^{2})
  - Land: 11.2 sq mi (28.9 km^{2})
  - Water: 0.19 sq mi (0.5 km^{2}) 1.61%
- Elevation: 285 ft (87 m)

Population (2020)
  - Total: 7,087
  - Density: 635/sq mi (245.3/km^{2})
- Time zone: UTC-5 (Eastern)
  - Summer (DST): UTC-4 (Eastern)
- ZIP code: 03811
- Area code: 603
- FIPS code: 33-02340
- GNIS feature ID: 873535
- Website: www.town-atkinsonnh.com

Atkinson is a town in Rockingham County, New Hampshire, United States. The population was 7,087 at the 2020 census. It is located 34 miles north of Boston and is part of the Greater Boston region.

== History ==
Atkinson's history dates back to the American Revolution. The community was incorporated September 3, 1767, and was named after Colonel Theodore Atkinson, a local landowner.

Atkinson Academy, the second-oldest co-educational school in the country, was founded as a boys' school in 1787 by Reverend Stephen Peabody, General Nathaniel Peabody and Doctor William Cogswell; it began admitting girls in 1791. The school building burned to the ground in 1802, and was rebuilt in 1803 at a cost of $2,500. That building remains a part of the academy, which has since been expanded, with only four classrooms.

The Kimball House Museum occupies a structure that was built in 1772 by the Reverend Stephen Peabody. In April 1907, Rev. Joseph A. Kimball, a summer resident, purchased the building from the Maddocks family in order to create a library for the town.

Atkinson's history can be read about in the book Atkinson Then and Now, which can be purchased at the Atkinson Public Library on Academy Avenue.

Atkinson celebrated its 250th anniversary on Labor Day weekend 2017.

== Geography ==
Atkinson is in southeastern New Hampshire, in the southwestern part of Rockingham County. It is bordered to the south by the city of Haverhill in Essex County, Massachusetts.

According to the United States Census Bureau, the town has a total area of 11.4 square miles (29.4 km^{2}), of which 11.2 square miles (28.9 km^{2}) are land and 0.2 square miles (0.5 km^{2}) are water, comprising 1.61% of the town. The highest point in Atkinson is Hog Hill, north of the town center, at 430 feet (130 m) above sea level. Atkinson is drained to the west by tributaries of the Spicket River and to the east by tributaries of the Little River, both southward-flowing tributaries of the Merrimack River.

In 2011 the New Hampshire Scenic and Cultural Byways program named 3.74 miles (6.02 km) of Main Street the "Stage Coach Byway".

=== Adjacent municipalities ===
- Hampstead (north)
- Plaistow (east)
- Haverhill, Massachusetts (south)
- Salem (west)
- Derry (northwest)

== Demographics ==
Historical population
Census	Pop.	Note	%±
1790	479		—
1800	474		−1.0%
1810	556		17.3%
1820	563		1.3%
1830	555		−1.4%
1840	567		2.2%
1850	600		5.8%
1860	546		−9.0%
1870	488		−10.6%
1880	502		2.9%
1890	483		−3.8%
1900	442		−8.5%
1910	440		−0.5%
1920	413		−6.1%
1930	407		−1.5%
1940	434		6.6%
1950	492		13.4%
1960	1,017		106.7%
1970	2,291		125.3%
1980	4,397		91.9%
1990	5,188		18.0%
2000	6,178		19.1%
2010	6,751		9.3%
2020	7,087		5.0%
U.S. Decennial Census

As of the census of 2000, there were 6,178 people, 2,317 households, and 1,777 families residing in the town. The population density was 555.2 inhabitants per square mile (214.4/km^{2}). There were 2,431 housing units at an average density of 218.5 per square mile (84.4/km^{2}). The racial makeup of the town was 97.62% White, 0.26% African American, 0.06% Native American, 1.18% Asian, 0.21% from other races, and 0.66% from two or more races. Hispanic or Latino of any race were 0.70% of the population.

There were 2,317 households, out of which 32.5% had children under the age of 18 living with them, 68.8% were married couples living together, 5.7% had a female householder with no husband present, and 23.3% were non-families. 19.0% of all households were made up of individuals, and 6.4% had someone living alone who was 65 years of age or older. The average household size was 2.66 and the average family size was 3.08.

In the town, the population was spread out, with 24.5% under the age of 18, 5.0% from 18 to 24, 28.4% from 25 to 44, 30.7% from 45 to 64, and 11.4% who were 65 years of age or older. The median age was 41 years. For every 100 females, there were 94.9 males. For every 100 females age 18 and over, there were 96.1 males.

The median income for a household in the town was $69,729, and the median income for a family was $77,631. Males had a median income of $53,229 versus $34,760 for females. The per capita income for the town was $30,412. About 2.3% of families and 3.3% of the population were below the poverty line, including 4.5% of those under age 18 and 2.2% of those age 65 or over.

== Transportation ==
Two New Hampshire state routes cross Atkinson.

- NH 111 crosses the extreme northern part of the town, passing just to the south of Island Pond. It connects with Windham to the southwest and Hampstead to the east.
- NH 121 is Atkinson's Main Street, crossing the center of town from north to southeast. It connects Hampstead in the north to Plaistow in the south, before ending in the northern part of Haverhill, Massachusetts.

The nearest airport is Manchester–Boston Regional Airport along the border of Londonderry and Manchester. The nearest rail service is the Haverhill Line of the MBTA Commuter Rail at Haverhill station in Massachusetts, which also serves as the Amtrak station.

== Education ==
Atkinson Public Schools are part of the Timberlane Regional School District. The district serves the communities of Atkinson, Danville, Plaistow and Sandown. The district has five elementary schools, a middle school and a high school. Students in Atkinson attend Atkinson Academy (claimed to be the oldest co-educational school still standing in the United States), Timberlane Regional Middle School, and Timberlane Regional High School.

== Notable people ==
- Brad Delp (1951–2007), lead singer of Boston and RTZ
- Karoline Leavitt (born 1997), White House Press Secretary
- John Noyes (1764–1841), member of the United States House of Representatives from Vermont
- Elizabeth Barrows Ussher (1873–1915), Christian missionary and witness of the Armenian Genocide
