= Joseph B. Harrington =

American judge and politician (1908–1964)

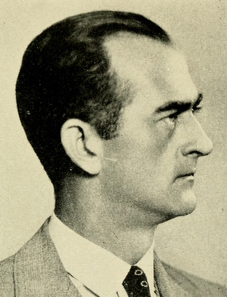
- Harrington as a member of the Massachusetts House of Representatives

Mayor of Salem, Massachusetts
- In office 1948–1949
- Preceded by: Edward A. Coffey
- Succeeded by: Francis X. Collins

Member of the Massachusetts House of Representatives for the 14th Essex district
- In office 1945–1946
- Preceded by: James F. Tobin
- Succeeded by: Arthur B. Carney Jr.

Member of the Massachusetts Senate for the 2nd Essex district
- In office 1941–1942
- Preceded by: Chandler Bigelow
- Succeeded by: J. Frank Hughes

Personal details
- Born: November 22, 1908 Salem, Massachusetts, U.S.
- Died: February 3, 1964 (aged 55) Salem, Massachusetts, U.S.
- Party: Democratic
- Children: 4, including Michael
- Education: Suffolk Law School
- Occupation: Attorney

Joseph B. Harrington (November 22, 1908 – February 3, 1964) was an American jurist and politician who was a member of the Massachusetts Senate (1941–1942) and Massachusetts House of Representatives (1945–1946), mayor of Salem, Massachusetts (1948–1949), and presiding justice of the Salem District Court (1957–1964).

== Early life ==
Harrington was born on November 22, 1908 in Salem, Massachusetts. His father, Cornelius F. Harrington, once served as Salem's city marshal. Harrington began working as a clerk-stenographer at the age of fifteen. He attended night school, graduating from Salem Evening High School and Suffolk Law School.

== Personal life ==
In 1932, Harrington married Elizabeth C. Kenneally, a secretary to Salem mayor Edward A. Coffey. They had four sons – Michael, Paul, Mark, and Peter. Michael J. Harrington represented Massachusetts's 6th congressional district in the United States House of Representatives. A nephew, Kevin B. Harrington, was President of the Massachusetts Senate.

== Politics ==
Harrington was elected to the Salem city council in 1937. In 1938, he was the Democratic nominee for the 13th Essex district seat in the Massachusetts House of Representatives. He lost to Republican incumbent J. Elmer Callahan by 58 votes. From 1941 to 1942, he represented the 2nd Essex district in the Massachusetts Senate. In 1941, he ran in the special election for Massachusetts's 7th congressional district seat held after the death of Lawrence J. Connery. He ran as an isolationist and was supported by United States Senator Gerald Nye and the America First Committee. He finished a distant third in the thirteen-candidate Democratic primary behind Thomas J. Lane and J. Fred Manning. He returned to the Massachusetts General Court in 1945 as the representative for the 14th Essex district.

In 1947, Harrington was elected mayor of Salem. He received 7,208 votes to city council president Philip L. Morencey's 3,995, and incumbent mayor Edward A. Coffey's 3,858. He was defeated for reelection in 1949 by Joseph X. Collins.

== Legal career ==
Harrington was admitted to the bar in 1932. In 1936, he was threatened with jail after he refused to reveal the name of a client who had committed a hit and run. In 1937, he represented two children of John Colby Sawyer, who were fighting their father for part of their grandmother, Berta C. Sawyer's, $50,000 estate. He was part of Daniel H. Coakley's defense team during his 1942 impeachment trial. He represented the National Leather Workers' Association during their 1943 strike in Salem and Peabody, Massachusetts.

During the 1951–1952 Massachusetts legislature, Harrington was the counsel to the House committee on rules. He advised the committee during their investigation into bribery allegations made by Worcester County district attorney Alfred B. Cenedella. The committee found the allegations to be false and called for Cenedella's removal. Harrington was removed by speaker Charles Gibbons in 1953 after the Republicans gained a majority in the House.

In 1955, he represented Donald F. Boisvert, one of four men accused of robbing and killing Harold A. Blodgett. Three of the men were convicted of murder, but Boisvert was only convicted for the robbery.

In 1957, Harrington was appointed presiding justice of the Salem district court by Governor Foster Furcolo. He remained on the bench until his death on February 3, 1964.
