= 1886 Massachusetts legislature =

107th meeting of the Massachusetts General Court

107th Massachusetts General Court
←	106th	108th	→

Overview
- Legislative body: General Court
- Election: November 3, 1885

Senate
- Members: 40
- President: Albert E. Pillsbury
- Party control: Republican

House
- Members: 240
- Speaker: John Q. A. Brackett
- Party control: Republican

Sessions
- 1st: January 6, 1886 – June 30, 1886

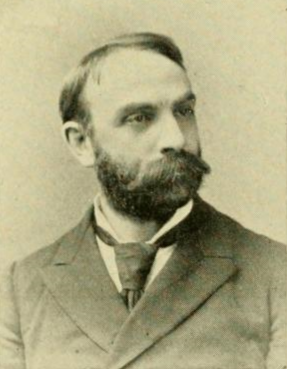
Albert Pillsbury, Senate president.

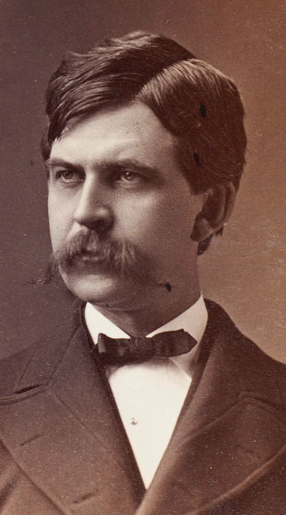
John Brackett, House speaker.

Leaders of the Massachusetts General Court, 1886.

The 107th Massachusetts General Court, consisting of the Massachusetts Senate and the Massachusetts House of Representatives, met in 1886 during the governorship of George D. Robinson. Albert E. Pillsbury served as president of the Senate and John Q. A. Brackett served as speaker of the House.

== Senators ==
- Alpheus B. Alger
- Francis Bigelow
- Eleazar Boynton
- William Cogswell
- William L. Douglas
- James R. Dunbar
- Charles B. Emerson
- William T. Forbes
- Charles A. Gleason
- John H. Gould
- Wesley A. Gove
- Levi J. Gunn
- John M. Harlow
- John J. Hayes
- Robert Howard
- Charles H. Howland
- Martin V. B. Jefferson
- Luman T. Jefts
- Edward D. G. Jones
- Frank W. Jones
- Allen L. Joslin
- Herbert C. Joyner
- Paul H. Kendricken
- Charles S. Lilley
- Samuel B. Locke
- Alexander McGahey
- Eben C. Milliken
- George W. Morrill
- Elijah A. Morse
- John R. Murphy
- Henry F. Naphen
- Howes Norris
- Henry S. Nourse
- Henry M. Phillips
- Albert E. Pillsbury
- Charles A. Reed
- Augustus E. Scott
- William H. Tappan
- Myron P. Walker
- Edward P. Wilbur

== Representatives ==
- Julius Caesar Chappelle

== See also ==
- 49th United States Congress
- List of Massachusetts General Courts
