= 1883 Massachusetts legislature =

104th meeting of the Massachusetts General Court

104th Massachusetts General Court
| ← | 103rd | 105th | → |

Overview
- Legislative body: General Court
- Election: November 7, 1882

Senate
- Members: 40
- President: George Glover Crocker
- Party control: Republican

House
- Members: 240
- Speaker: George A. Marden
- Party control: Republican

Sessions
- 1st: January 5, 1883 – July 27, 1883

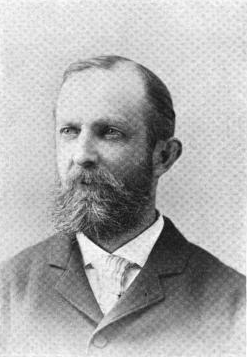
George Crocker, Senate president.

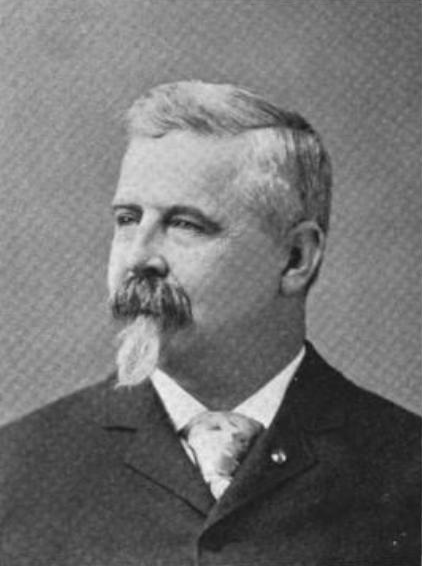
George Marden, House speaker.

Leaders of the Massachusetts General Court, 1883.

The 104th Massachusetts General Court, consisting of the Massachusetts Senate and the Massachusetts House of Representatives, met in 1883 during the governorship of Benjamin Butler. George Glover Crocker served as president of the Senate and George A. Marden served as speaker of the House.

== Senators ==
| Senator | District | Hometown | Party | Since |
|---|---|---|---|---|
| Chas. H. Allen | 7th Middlesex | | | |
| James S. Allen | 2nd Plymouth | | | |
| John R. Baldwin | 1st Essex | Lynn | Democratic | 1882 |
| Alvan Barrus | Hampshire | | | |
| Charles P. Barton | 3rd Worcester | | | |
| Theodore C. Bates | 4th Worcester | | | |
| Edwin Bowley | 5th Essex | | | |
| George A. Bruce | 1st Middlesex | Somerville | Republican | 1882 |
| George G. Crocker | 4th Suffolk | Boston | Republican | 1880 |
| John W. Cummings | 2nd Bristol | Fall River | | |
| Benjamin F. Cutter | 8th Suffolk | | | |
| Lincoln Drake | 1st Bristol | | | |
| Knowles Freeman | 1st Suffolk | | | |
| Owen Galvin | 3rd Suffolk | Boston | Democratic | 1882 |
| Charles F. Gerry | 5th Middlesex | Sudbury | | 1881 |
| Onslow Gilmore | 6th Middlesex | | | |
| William H. Haile | 1st Hampden | Springfield | Republican | 1882 |
| Dexter B. Hitchcock | 2nd Hampden | | | |
| George W. Johnson | 2nd Worcester | | | |
| Joseph P. Johnson | Cape | | | |
| Rufus Livermore | Franklin | | | |
| Warren E. Locke | 2nd Norfolk | | | |
| Edward P. Loring | 5th Worcester | | | |
| Benjamin S. Lovell | 1st Norfolk | | | |
| Peleg McFarlin | 1st Plymouth | | | |
| James A. McGeough | 5th Suffolk | | | |
| Walter N. Mason | 4th Middlesex | | | |
| James O. Parker | 6th Essex | | | |
| Charles B. Pratt | 1st Worcester | | | |
| Charles S. Randall | 3rd Bristol | New Bedford | Republican | 1882 |
| David Randall | 2nd Middlesex | | | |
| Frederick S. Risteen | 6th Suffolk | | | |
| Charles A. Sayward | 4th Essex | | | |
| John M. Seeley | South Berkshire | | | |
| John H. Sherburne | 2nd Suffolk | | | |
| William Sparhawk | 2nd Essex | | | |
| Isaac A.S. Steele | 3rd Essex | | | |
| Foster E. Swift | North Berkshire | | | |
| Arthur W. Tufts | 7th Suffolk | | | |
| Henry J. Wells | 3rd Middlesex | | | |

== Representatives ==
- Frank W. Adams
- John A. Aiken
- Samuel N. Aldrich
- Heman L. Allen
- David L. Ambrose
- Arlon S. Atherton
- Francis S. Babbitt
- Charles H. Baker
- John I. Baker
- George H. Ball
- William A. Bancroft
- Forrest E. Barker
- George A. Barker
- Charles T. Barnard
- John S. Barton
- George E. Batchelder
- Butler Bates
- Emory L. Bates
- Theodore D. Beach
- Charles D. Belden
- Warren A. Bird
- Nelson H. Bixby
- Halsey J. Boardman
- Horace L. Bowker
- Bradford B. Briggs
- Andrew C. Brigham
- Andrew J. Browne
- Benajah Bugbee
- Charles C. Burr
- Horace W Bush
- Daniel Butler
- Edward P. Butler
- Thomas C. Butler
- Jesse B. Butterfield
- Hobart M. Cable
- Benjamin F. Campbell
- Rufus G. F. Candage
- Alonzo A. Carr
- Louis T. Cashing
- George D. Chamberlain
- Julius C. Chappelle
- John H. Cheever
- William F. Chester
- Aaron F. Clark
- Charles N. Clark
- Elijah C. Clark
- George L. Clark
- Wilder P. Clark
- Daniel B. Cluff
- Francis D. Cobb
- Adams H. Cogswell
- William Cogswell
- Christopher P. Conlin
- John P. Coombs
- William A. Copeland
- Michael W. Costello
- John Courtney
- George Cowdrey
- George E. Craig
- Cornelins F. Cronin
- Solomon F. Cushman
- James F. Davenport
- Samuel M. Davis
- James R. Denham
- John Doherty
- Daniel F. Dolan
- Michael J. Dolan
- Charles W. Donahoe
- William L. Douglas
- Rufus A. Dunham
- James F. Dwinell
- Warren Eames
- Edmund T. Eastman
- William N. Eaton
- James R. Entwistle
- George A. O. Ernst
- Jeremiah G. Fennessey
- Oliver G. Fernald
- Henry G. B. Fisher
- David Fisk
- Patrick E. Foley
- Joshua T. Foster
- William W. Foster
- Clarendon A. Freeman
- Josiah Freeman
- William H. Frizzell
- Charles Fuller
- Warren D. Fuller
- Frank H. Gaffney
- John W. Gifford
- Dennis Gilmartin
- Jacob Gimlich
- Edward Glines
- Allen W. Goodman
- William Gordon, Jr
- Jesse M. Gove
- Thomas J. Hall
- George A. Harden
- Fred M. Harrub
- Harris C. Hartwell
- John E. Hayes
- Allen Higginbottom
- Edwin A. Hildreth
- Edwin N, Hill
- Caleb Holbrook
- John Hopkins
- Erastus Howes
- Lewis W. Howes
- Charles W. Howland
- Sabin Hubbard
- Samuel C Hunt
- George L Huntoon
- Charles C. Hutchinson
- John Jackson
- Joseph Jacobs, Jr
- Luman T. Jefts
- Herbert C. Joyner
- Joseph J. Kelley
- George Kellog
- William Kilduff
- D. Frank Kimball
- William R. Kimball
- Chester W. Kingsley
- George E. Kniffin
- Charles H. Knox
- George A. Lackey
- Abraham J. Lamb
- Omon H. Lawrence
- George E. Learnard
- John W. Leighton
- Job M. Leonard
- Edwin Leonard, 2d
- Charles S. Lincoln
- Solomon Linnell, 2d
- George W. Littlefield
- Charles S. Lord
- Charles A. Mackintosh
- John G. Maguire
- Patrick H. Manning
- Charles B. Martin
- Henry B. Martin
- Thomas Martin
- James H. Mason
- Martin S. McCormick
- Patrick F. McDonald
- Patrick F. McGaragle
- John A. McLaughlin
- Arthur F. Means
- William R. Melden
- James H. Mellen
- Charles H. Miller
- John D. Miller
- Eugene M. Moriarty
- Alva S. Morrison
- Bushrod Morse
- Leonard T. Morse
- Jeremiah H. Mullane
- John R. Murphy
- Jesse L. Nason
- Charles S. Newell
- Henry S. Nourse
- Francis O'Brien
- David F. O'Connell
- John Olmsted
- John L. Parker
- Walter O. Parker
- William G. A. Pattee
- W. Scott Peabody
- Herbert L. Peck
- Francis E. Pedrick
- Isaac F. B. Perry
- Edwin L. Pilsbury
- Burton W. Potter
- Richman H. Potter
- Lyman K. Putney
- Charles L. Randall
- John Reade
- Charles M. Reed
- Enos H. Reynolds
- Samuel I. Rice
- Charles W. Richardson
- David Richardson
- Orlando G. Robinson
- Charles H. Rowland
- Wingate P. Sargent
- Leonard A. Saville
- William H. Sayward
- William A. Searell
- Michael Sexton
- Edward H. Shaw
- Pliny M. Shaylor
- Thomas C. Simpson
- Edward E. Small
- Charles Smith
- George E. Smith
- Joel Smith
- Edmund F. Snow
- Henry H. Sprague
- Samuel Staples
- Charles D. Starbird
- John B. Stebbins
- Marquis D. F. Steere
- Alonzo J. Stetson
- George F. Stetson
- Sprague S. Stetson
- Levi Stockbridge
- T. Dwight Stow
- Dwight W. Streeter
- Dennis A. Sullivan
- Albert H. Sweetser
- James W. Switzer
- James Tarone
- John Tilley
- Charles A. Towne
- Albert Tyler
- Daniel H. Varnum
- Aaron G. Walker
- Henry L. Warfield
- John F. Warner
- Franklin I. Webster
- Amerrcus Welch
- Daniel W. Wells
- Thomas Weston, Jr
- Charles Wheeler
- Henry J. White
- John Whitehill
- Arthur F. Whitin
- Albert T. Whiting
- William Whitmarsh
- William H. Whitney
- Thomas P. Wiggins
- Ansel F. Wildes
- John W. Wilkinson
- Fred. H. Williams
- John S. Williams
- Edmund B. Willson
- Roger Wolcott
- John H. Wright

== See also ==
- 1883 Massachusetts gubernatorial election
- 48th United States Congress
- List of Massachusetts General Courts
