= 1885 Massachusetts legislature =

106th meeting of the Massachusetts General Court

106th Massachusetts General Court
←	105th	107th	→

Overview
- Legislative body: General Court
- Election: November 4, 1884

Senate
- Members: 40
- President: Albert E. Pillsbury
- Party control: Republican

House
- Members: 240
- Speaker: John Q. A. Brackett
- Party control: Republican

Sessions
- 1st: January 7, 1885 – June 19, 1885

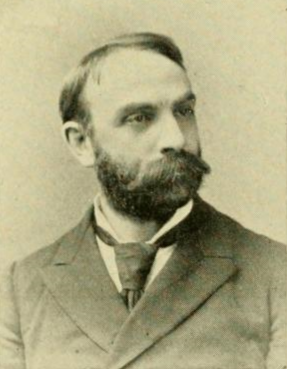
Albert Pillsbury, Senate president.

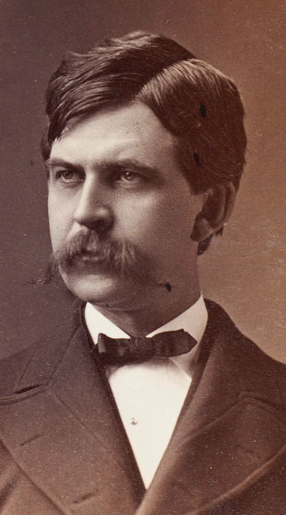
John Brackett, House speaker.

Leaders of the Massachusetts General Court, 1885.

The 106th Massachusetts General Court, consisting of the Massachusetts Senate and the Massachusetts House of Representatives, met in 1885 during the governorship of George D. Robinson. Albert E. Pillsbury served as president of the Senate and John Q. A. Brackett served as speaker of the House.

In 1885 the legislature officialized the state coat of arms and seal. Other notable legislation included an "Act to Protect Persons Using Public Libraries From Disturbance."

== Senators ==
- Frank M. Ames
- John F. Andrew
- Josiah C. Bennett
- Francis Bigelow
- Eleazar Boynton
- Frederick L. Burden
- George L. Burt
- William Cogswell
- Charles A. Denny
- James R. Dunbar
- Charles B. Emerson
- Newton P. Frye
- Wesley A. Gove
- Levi J. Gunn
- John M. Harlow
- Charles H. Howland
- Martin V. B. Jefferson
- Herbert C. Joyner
- Paul H. Kendricken
- Job M. Leonard
- George A. Marden
- Alexander McGahey
- Eben C. Milliken
- George W. Morrill
- Henry F. Naphen
- Howes Norris
- Henry S. Nourse
- Albert E. Pillsbury
- Horace Reed
- Thomas P. Root
- George W. Sanderson
- Augustus E. Scott
- William R. Sessions
- William H. Tappan
- S. Proctor Thayer
- Edward I. Thomas
- Ezra J. Trull
- Myron P. Walker
- Henry J. Wells
- Arthur F. Whitin

== Representatives ==
- Julius Caesar Chappelle

== See also ==
- 49th United States Congress
- List of Massachusetts General Courts
