= 1885 Massachusetts gubernatorial election =

- November 3, 1885
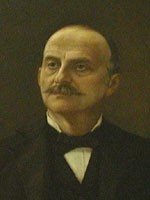

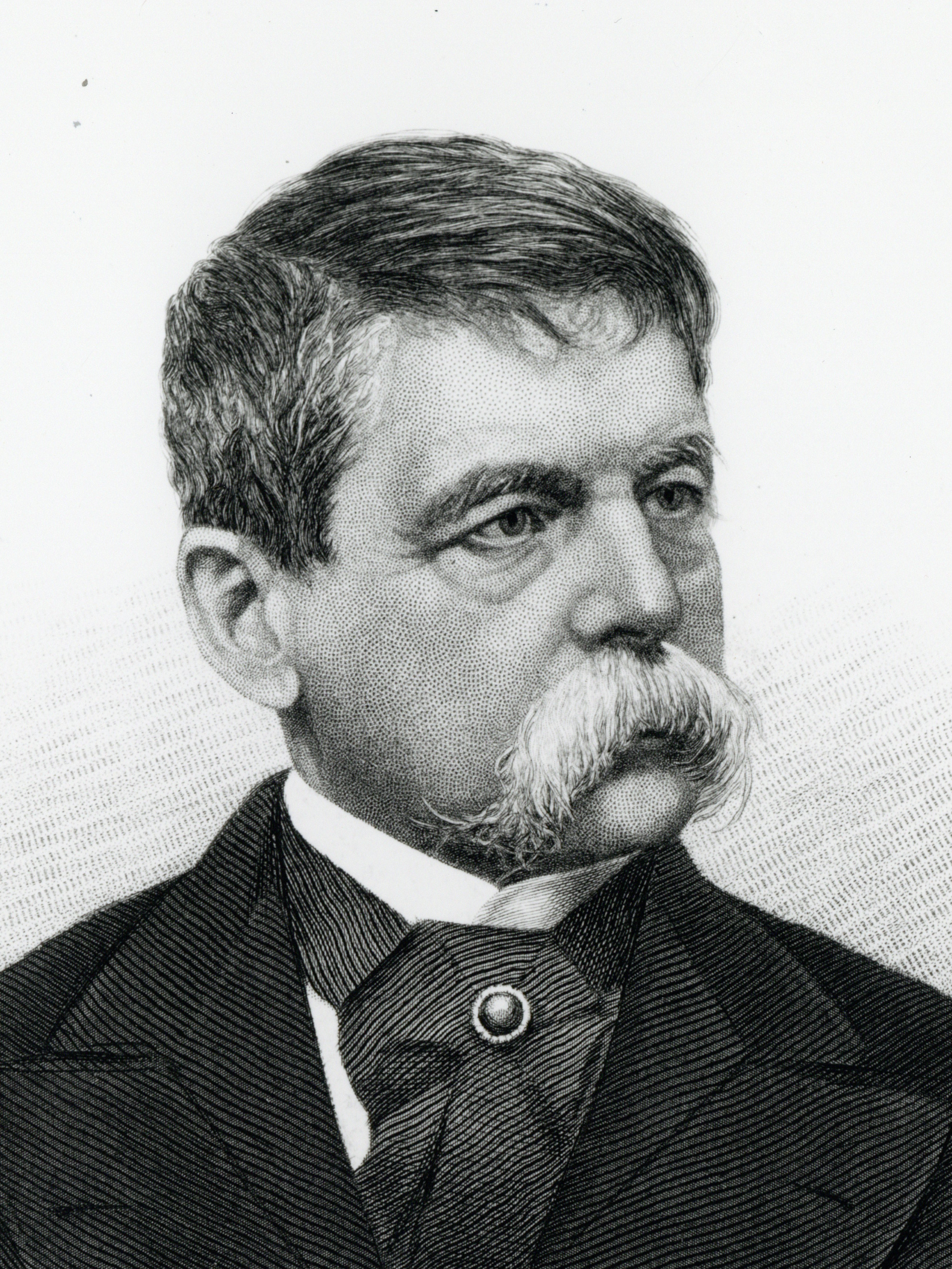
Nominee	George D. Robinson	Frederick O. Prince
Party	Republican	Democratic
Popular vote	112,243	90,346
Percentage	53.53%	43.09%
- Robinson: 40-50% 50–60% 60–70% 70–80% 80–90% >90% Prince: 40-50% 50–60% 60–70% 70–80% Tie: 40-50% 50% No data
Governor before election
George D. Robinson
Republican
Elected Governor
George D. Robinson
Republican

The 1885 Massachusetts gubernatorial election was held on November 3. Incumbent Republican governor George D. Robinson was re-elected to a third term in office over Democratic Mayor of Boston Frederick O. Prince.

== General election ==
=== Candidates ===
- Thomas J. Lothrop (Prohibition)
- Frederick O. Prince, former mayor of Boston (Democratic)
- George D. Robinson, incumbent governor (Republican)
- James Sumner (Greenback)

=== Results ===
1885 Massachusetts gubernatorial election
Party	Candidate	Votes	%	±%
Republican	George D. Robinson (incumbent)	112,243	53.53%	▲1.13
Democratic	Frederick O. Prince	90,346	43.09%	▲6.32
Prohibition	Thomas J. Lothrop	4,714	2.25%	▼0.56
Greenback	James Sumner	2,227	1.06%	▼6.95
Write-in	All others	138	0.07%	▲0.06
Total votes		209,668	100.00%	

== See also ==
- 1885 Massachusetts legislature
