= 1884 Massachusetts legislature =

105th meeting of the Massachusetts General Court

105th Massachusetts General Court
←	104th	106th	→

Overview
- Legislative body: General Court
- Election: November 6, 1883

Senate
- Members: 40
- President: George A. Bruce (1st Middlesex)
- Party control: Republican

House
- Members: 240
- Speaker: George A. Marden
- Party control: Republican

Sessions
- 1st: January 2, 1884 – June 4, 1884

The 105th Massachusetts General Court was convened in 1884. It sat Watson F. Hammond, the first American Indian to be elected to the Great and General Court.

== Representatives ==
- Julius Caesar Chappelle

== See also ==
- 48th United States Congress
- List of Massachusetts General Courts
