= Senator Crocker =

Senator Crocker may refer to:

- Alvah Crocker (1801–1874), Massachusetts State Senate
- George G. Crocker (1843–1913), Massachusetts State Senate
