= 1883 Massachusetts gubernatorial election =

- November 6, 1883
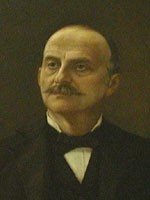

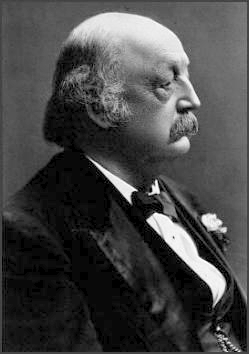
Nominee	George D. Robinson	Benjamin Franklin Butler
Party	Republican	Democratic
Alliance		Greenback; Ind. Republican
Popular vote	160,092	150,228
Percentage	51.25%	48.10%
- Robinson: 40–50% 50–60% 60–70% 70–80% 80–90% >90% Butler: 40–50% 50–60% 60–70%
Governor before election
Benjamin Franklin Butler
Democratic
Elected Governor
George D. Robinson
Republican

The 1883 Massachusetts gubernatorial election was held on November 6.

Governor Benjamin Butler ran for re-election on a fusion ticket between the Democratic Party and the Greenback Labor Party, but was defeated by Republican U.S. Representative George D. Robinson.

In the concurrent but separate election for lieutenant governor, Republican Oliver Ames was re-elected to a second term.

== Republican nomination ==
=== Candidates ===
- George D. Robinson, U.S. representative from Chicopee

==== Declined ====
- Henry L. Pierce, former mayor of Boston

==== Results ====
1883 Republican state convention
Party	Candidate	Votes	%
Republican	George D. Robinson	996	87.52%
Republican	Charles Francis Adams Jr.	117	10.28%
Republican	George A. Bruce	35	3.08%
Republican	Thomas Talbot	6	0.53%
Republican	Henry Cabot Lodge	5	0.44%
Republican	Charles R. Codman Sr.	3	0.26%
Republican	Benjamin W. Harris	2	0.18%
Republican	Rufus S. Frost	1	0.09%
Republican	Alexander H. Rice	1	0.09%
Republican	Alanson W. Beard	1	0.09%
Republican	Henry B. Pierce	1	0.09%
Total votes		1,138	100.00%

== General election ==
=== Results ===
1883 Massachusetts gubernatorial election
Party	Candidate	Votes	%	±%
Republican	George D. Robinson	160,092	51.25%	
Democratic	Benjamin Franklin Butler (inc.)	150,228	48.10%	
Prohibition	Charles Almy	1,881	0.60%	
Others	Others	156	0.05%	
Republican gain from Democratic		Swing		

Massachusetts lt. gubernatorial election, 1883
Party	Candidate	Votes	%	±%
Republican	Oliver Ames (inc.)	161,399	51.69%	
Democratic	James S. Greenfield	147,661	47.29%	
Prohibition	John Blackmer	1,911	0.61%	
Greenback	Nathaniel S. Cushing	1,091	0.35%	
Others	Others	154	0.05%	
Republican hold		Swing		

== See also ==
- 1883 Massachusetts legislature
