= 1884 Massachusetts gubernatorial election =

- November 4, 1884
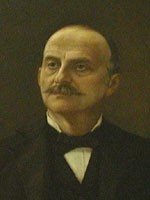

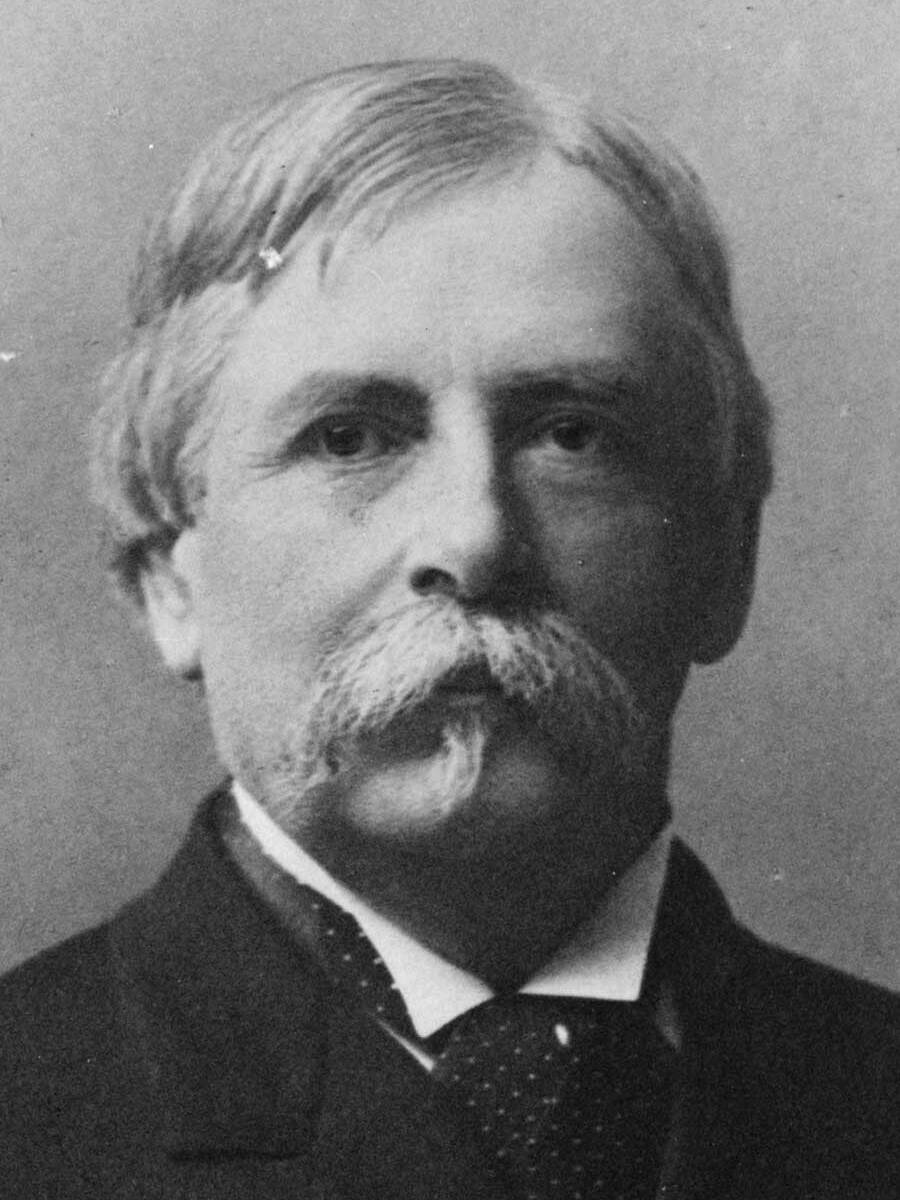

Nominee	George D. Robinson	William C. Endicott	Matthew J. McCafferty
Party	Republican	Democratic	Greenback
Popular vote	159,345	111,829	24,363
Percentage	52.40%	36.77%	8.01%
- Robinson: 40-50% 50–60% 60–70% 70–80% 80–90% >90% Endicott: 30-40% 40-50% 50–60% 60–70% Tie: 40-50%
Governor before election
George D. Robinson
Republican
Elected Governor
George D. Robinson
Republican

The 1884 Massachusetts gubernatorial election was held on November 4. Incumbent Republican governor George D. Robinson was re-elected to a second term in office over Democrat William Crowninshield Endicott.

== General election ==
=== Candidates ===
- William Crowninshield Endicott, former judge of the Massachusetts Supreme Judicial Court and candidate for U.S. representative in 1879 (Democratic)
- Matthew J. McCafferty, aide to former governor Benjamin Butler (Greenback)
- George D. Robinson, incumbent governor (Republican)
- Julius H. Seelye, president of Amherst College and former U.S. representative (Prohibition)

=== Results ===
1884 Massachusetts gubernatorial election (Note: In 1883, Governor Benjamin Butler was both the Democratic and Greenback nominee. However, official tallies counted his votes on both tickets together. No totals for the individual party votes for Butler is recorded, thus it is not possible to calculate the percentage change for those parties.)
Party	Candidate	Votes	%	±%
Republican	George D. Robinson (incumbent)	159,345	52.40%	▲1.15
Democratic	William Crowninshield Endicott	111,829	36.77%	N/A
Greenback	Matthew J. McCafferty	24,363	8.01%	N/A
Prohibition	Julius H. Seelye	8,542	2.81%	▲2.21
Write-in	All others	36	0.01%	▼0.04
Total votes		304,115	100.00%	

== See also ==
- 1884 Massachusetts legislature
