= Uriel Crocker =

American businessman (1796–1887)

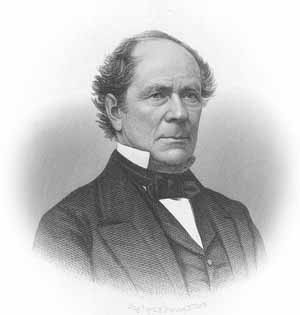
- Born: September 12, 1796; Marblehead, Massachusetts
- Died: July 19, 1887 (aged 90); Cohasset, Massachusetts
- Spouse: Sarah Kidder Haskell
- Children: Uriel Haskell Crocker; Sarah Haskell Crocker; George Glover Crocker

Uriel Crocker (September 12, 1796 – July 19, 1887) was a public-spirited Boston citizen, head of the Crocker & Brewster publishing house during its 58-year existence (1818-1876), and actively involved in other enterprises including railroads.

Crocker was born in Marblehead, Massachusetts, as one of eight children of the elder Uriel Crocker and his second wife, Mary James. He graduated from the academy at Marblehead in August 1811, as first scholar. In the next month, on the day after he turned fifteen years old, Crocker began work in Boston as an apprentice in the printing-office of Samuel Turell Armstrong (afterwards mayor of Boston and acting governor of the Commonwealth), who also carried on a bookselling business.

At age 19 Crocker was made foreman of the printing-office, and at 22 was, with his fellow-apprentice Osmyn Brewster taken into partnership with Armstrong. The agreement was that the bookstore was to be conducted in the name of Mr. Armstrong, and the printing-office in that of Crocker & Brewster. After 1825 the entire business was carried on under the name of Crocker & Brewster (although Mr. Armstrong continued a member of the firm until 1840). The printing-office was then in Mr. Crocker's especial charge and the bookstore in that of Mr. Brewster. (For a subsequent history of the firm, see Crocker & Brewster.)

In 1829 Crocker married Sarah Kidder Haskell. Their children were Uriel Haskell Crocker, Sarah Haskell Crocker, and George Glover Crocker. Mrs. Crocker died January 16, 1856, at the age of fifty years.

In 1866, Dartmouth College conferred upon him an honorary degree of A. M. He died at his summer residence in Cohasset on July 19, 1887.

== Other business activities ==
In later years, Crocker became heavily involved with railway companies. He was one of the organizers of the Old Colony Railroad Company and a director. He was also a director of the Northern (N.H.) Railroad Company, the Concord Railroad, the Atlantic & Pacific Railroad (where he was vice-president from 1870 to 1873, and president 1874), the South Pacific Railroad, and the St. Louis & San Francisco Railroad.

Crocker was also president and director of the Proprietors of the Revere House; of the United States Hotel Company; of the South Cove Corporation; of the South Bay Improvement Company; and of the Tremont Nail Company. He was also one of the original corporators of the Franklin Savings Bank.

== Charitable activities ==
Crocker was a leader in the movement for building the Bunker Hill Monument and raised $40,000 for the fund. He was director of the Monument Association from 1833 till 1869, and vice-president from 1869 till his death, declining to accept the position of president.

In addition, he held leadership roles in the Massachusetts Charitable Mechanic Association, the Massachusetts Charitable Fire Society, the Massachusetts Charitable Society, the Board of Managers of the Boston Dispensary, the Mount Auburn Cemetery, the Old South Society, the Boston House of Correction, the Boston Lying-In Hospital, the Massachusetts Horticultural Society, the New England Historic Genealogical Society, and the Bostonian Society.

A plaque in Crocker Park, Marblehead, Massachusetts, records that Crocker donated the park's excellent site on June 15, 1886, later extended by a further gift from his two sons.

== Bibliography ==
- Bacon, Edwin M., Editor. Men of Progress: One Thousand Biographical Sketches and Portraits of Leaders in Business and Professional Life in the Commonwealth of Massachusetts. Boston: New England Magazine, 1896.
- Toomey, Daniel.:, Massachusetts of Today: A Memorial of the State, Historical and Biographical, Issued for the World's Columbian Exposition at Chicago, Columbia Publishing Company, Boston, Massachusetts, page 32, (1892).

This article is derived from the Men of Progress entry for Crocker, on which copyright has expired.
