= Goodell-Pratt =

American manufacturer (1888–1931)

- Industry: Manufacturing
- Founded: 1888 (as Goodell Brothers Company)
- Defunct: 1931
- Fate: Merged with Millers Falls Company
- Successor: Millers Falls Company
- Headquarters: Greenfield, Massachusetts
- Key people: William M. Pratt
- Products: Carpenter's and mechanic's tools,
- Number of employees: 400 employees (1930)

Goodell-Pratt was a tool manufacturing company based in Greenfield, Massachusetts.

The company was founded in 1888 as the Goodell Brothers Company by Albert and Henry E. Goodell, and was located in Shelburne Falls, Massachusetts.

Goodell-Pratt plant in Greenfield, Massachusetts, January 1912.

Goodell-Pratt was created by William Pratt after he purchased the Goodell Brothers Company. In 1895, after he purchased half of the company, Pratt became treasurer and manager and after he purchased the rest of the company, he renamed it the Goodell-Pratt Company.

In 1925 Goodell-Pratt purchased the A.F. Way Company's electric drill operations and began to produce power tools. By 1929 Goodell-Pratt had three production facilities and was producing 1500 separate tools. With the advent of the economic slowdown that resulted from 1929 stock market crash, the Goodell-Pratt's excess capacity was a drag on its profits. Goodell-Pratt's stock went to fifty cents a share and it was purchased by the Millers Falls Company, in 1931 Goodell-Pratt was merged into the Millers Falls Company.

== See also ==
- List of defunct consumer brands
