= Forest Hills disaster =

1887 railroad accident in Massachusetts

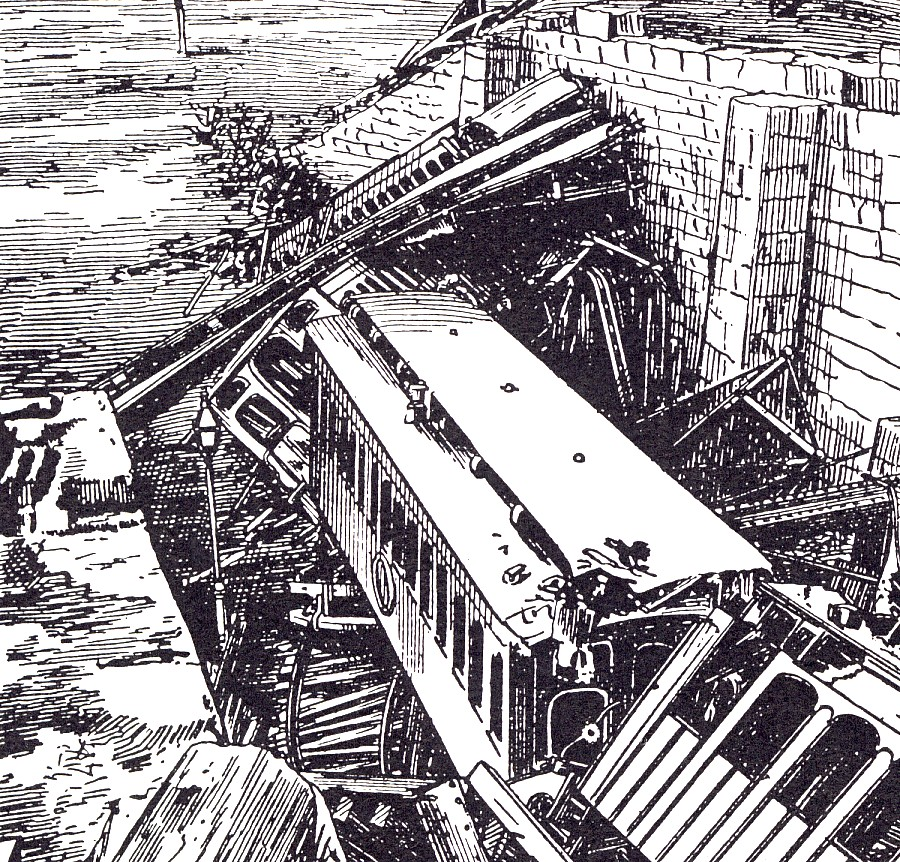
- A drawing from The Boston Globe of the accident scene

Details
- Date: March 14, 1887 (139 years ago); Shortly after 7:00 am
- Location: Roslindale, Boston, Massachusetts
- Coordinates: 42.2938°N 71.1231°W
- Country: U.S.
- Line: Dedham Branch
- Operator: Boston & Providence Railroad
- Incident type: Bridge collapse under load
- Cause: Poor design and maintenance

Statistics
- Trains: 1
- Passengers: 275 to 300
- Crew: 8
- Deaths: 23 (22 passengers, 1 crew)
- Injured: 100+

The Forest Hills disaster (also known as the Bussey Bridge disaster) was a railroad bridge accident that occurred on March 14, 1887, in the Roslindale section of Boston, Massachusetts. The bridge collapsed while a commuter train was crossing it, resulting in 23 deaths.

== Accident ==
A morning commuter train, inbound to Boston, was traveling over the Dedham Branch of the Boston and Providence Railroad on a sunny Monday morning with about 300 passengers, including several school children. Roughly midway between the Roslindale and Forest Hills stations and near the Arnold Arboretum, the line crossed over South Street via the Bussey Bridge, about 6 miles (9.7 km) from the city proper. The train consisted of a locomotive, which weighed 32 1/2 tons, followed by nine cars: eight passenger cars plus a combination baggage and smoking car at the end. The train had a crew of eight men: an engineer, a fireman, three conductors, and three brakemen.

As it reached the Boston end of the Bussey Bridge, the locomotive jarred upward and the engineer looked back and saw that the coupling to the first car had broken, the first two cars had derailed, and there was a cloud of smoke rising—he realized there had been a collapse. The engineer immediately decided to proceed in his locomotive, as it was still on the track, to the Forest Hills station to summon assistance, which he did. Meanwhile, the first three cars came to rest on the embankment next to the track, along with the roof of the fourth car, while the body of the fourth car along with the fifth through ninth cars came to rest in the street below the bridge. Twenty-three people were killed, (Note: The total of 23 deaths is per the official report of the Massachusetts Railroad Commission. While The Boston Globe initially reported a death toll of 37 (headline) or 38 (article), the count was reduced to 25 the following day, with the paper noting "it has been extremely difficult to procure anything like an accurate list of those who were killed".) including one crew member, (Note: The crew member killed was conductor Myron Tilden.) and over 100 were injured.

Reports of the disaster appeared on the front page of major newspapers, highlighting the suffering of the injured, as some were transfixed by splinters throughout their bodies, others were dismembered, and yet others were badly mangled. The first body that rescuers pulled from the wreck was that of a headless woman. Two young men were pinned under a pile of rubble with a car stove full of glowing coals hanging over them; fortunately, the stove stayed closed and they were rescued. A possible fire in the smoking car, where passengers were trapped, was averted by quick action from arriving firemen.

== Investigation ==
The Massachusetts Railroad Commission launched an inquiry into the accident; their report was submitted to the state legislature in late April 1887. The report was authored by George G. Crocker, Edward W. Kinsley, and Everett A. Stevens. It was published in The Boston Globe on April 28, 1887, with a sub-headline referring to the bridge as "Bad in Contract and Bad in Make, Bad in Testing and Very Bad in General". The report also appeared in the commission's annual report of January 1888. Key findings were as follows.

The Bussey Bridge had originally been constructed as a Howe truss, (Note: A Howe truss is usually constructed with the bottom of the trusses at or near the level of the rails, with the top of the trusses several yards or meters higher, and the deck that the rails are on hangs from vertical posts attached to the top of the trusses. The Bussey Bridge was constructed with the trusses below the level of the rails, which changes how load is distributed.) with two wooden trusses. In 1870, one wooden truss, the westerly one, was replaced with an iron truss, (Note: The 1870 iron truss has been described as a Parker truss, "a double intersection Pratt truss" or a Whipple truss. Parker and Whipple are variants of Pratt.) that work being done by the National Bridge Company. In 1876, the remaining wooden truss was removed, the 1870 iron truss was moved to the easterly side, and a new iron truss was installed on the westerly side, this being designed and overseen by Edmund H. Hewins as civil engineer. Hewins had represented himself as an agent of the Metropolitan Bridge Company to secure the work; however, the commission found that the company did not exist, it was only Hewins working for himself. The commission appeared to blame the railroad more than Hewins, for not vetting him properly:

If the management of the railroad had taken the trouble to make inquiry, it would have learned that the company which Mr. Hewins professed to represent did not in fact exist, and that not only the design but the quality of much of the materials and workmanship of the bridge depended solely upon his ability, honesty and faithfulness.

As a matter of fact, the material and workmanship of the compression members (Note: Usually in a Howe truss, vertical members are in tension and diagonal members are in compression. However, as the trusses of the Bussey Bridge were located under the deck supporting the rails, most elements of the trusses were in compression.) appear to have been sufficiently good. The design in many of its details proved to be bad.

Such a way of doing business would be lax in a purely commercial transaction. In contracting for and constructing a bridge, in dealing with a matter involving the safety of life, it was culpable.

The bridge deck supporting the rails was held up by cross beams, which were affixed differently to the two trusses. As the top of the 1870 truss was essentially flat, the cross beams directly rested on it. However, the top of the Hewins truss was made differently and the cross beams were attached via hangers, located in "joint-blocks" where elements of the truss intersected. Civil engineer and professor George F. Swain of MIT commented that "The hanging of the floor beams to the upper chord of a deck bridge is a fault in design and very easily avoided." Additionally, the commission's report highlighted issues with the hangers:

- the bridge was constructed with the hangers only partially visibly, thus not subject to complete inspection
- the hangers had been made asymmetrically, thus reducing their strength
- the hangers should have been die forged, (Note: Die forging is a metal-shaping process where a heated metal workpiece is forced into a die to give it a specific shape.) but had been "imperfectly" welded

It was also noted that the Hewins truss was carrying about 80% of the load of a passing train, with the bridge's other truss only carrying about 20%—this was due to spacing between the trusses and the placement of the track, as room had been left to allow for a second track.

The commission concluded that "the evidence as a whole clearly indicates that the original cause of the disaster was the breaking of the hangers at the joint-block at the north end of the Hewins truss" and "The hangers were unfit for their work. The wonder is that they held on so long as they did. They had been breaking for some time."

The commission also noted issues with the railroad's maintenance of the bridge:

- a recommendation that the bridge be tested under load on an annual basis had not been followed
- the railroad's superintendent of construction, who was responsible for inspecting the bridge, was unaware of the hangers and seemingly unconcerned that he could not inspect parts of the support structure
- a recommendation that bridges have guard rails and guard timbers—to prevent a derailed wheel from knocking out truss members—had not been followed
- a recommendation that ties on bridges be close together had not been followed, and while the railroad's superintendent of construction asserted that ties on the bridge were 8 inches (20 cm) apart, they were actually 15 to 18 inches (38 to 46 cm) apart

For the latter concern, the commission wrote, "As it happened, the accident was not caused by the defects of the tie system, but the management is none the less censurable for its long-continued neglect to remove this undoubted element of danger."

Lastly, the commission noted operational issues with the train in question:

- automatic air brakes were not operational on the train, as it had a mix of cars with and without them
- a train of nine cars should have had five brakemen, per statute, but there were only three brakemen

The overall findings led the commission to state:

In the erection and inspection of bridges the management of a railroad is bound to exercise the utmost care. Had such care been exercised, there is every reason to believe that the disaster would have been prevented. On the thirty-second page of the last report of the Commission is the following: The Board renews the expression of its belief that a preventible accident is a crime.

== Later events ==
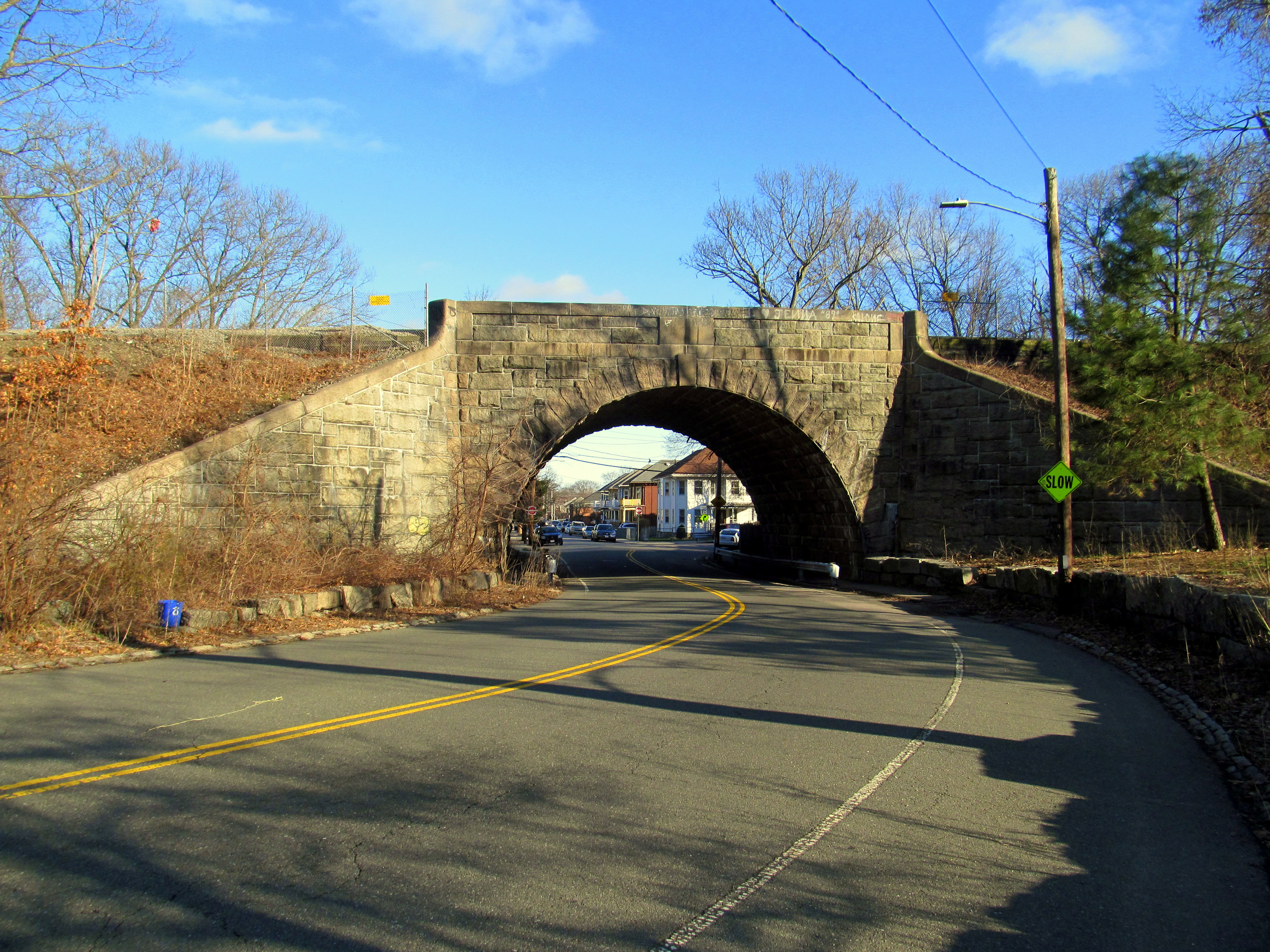
The replacement arch bridge

Boston and Providence Railroad faced claims of $450,000 ($16.1 million in 2025), which nearly sent the company into bankruptcy. The company was taken over by Old Colony Railroad in April 1888.

Edmund H. Hewins continued to live and work in Boston until about 1910, when he and his wife moved to Sharon, Massachusetts. Despite his role in designing the ill-fated truss, mentions of his name in connection with the disaster appear to be absent from Boston newspapers after April 1887. Hewins died in Sharon in 1920; his obituary in The Boston Globe highlighted his contributions to Sharon and that he was a direct descendant of the builder of the USS Constitution.

The collapsed bridge was replaced with a concrete and stone arch bridge, which still stands and carries tracks serving the MBTA Commuter Rail. A small memorial plaque is located on the easterly side of the bridge. The plaque reads, in part: "dedicated to the memory of those men and women who perished in the disaster. Their deaths were instrumental in the imposition of stricter bridge safety standards for all railroad bridges."

== Gallery ==
Bussey Bridge images and drawings, c. 1887
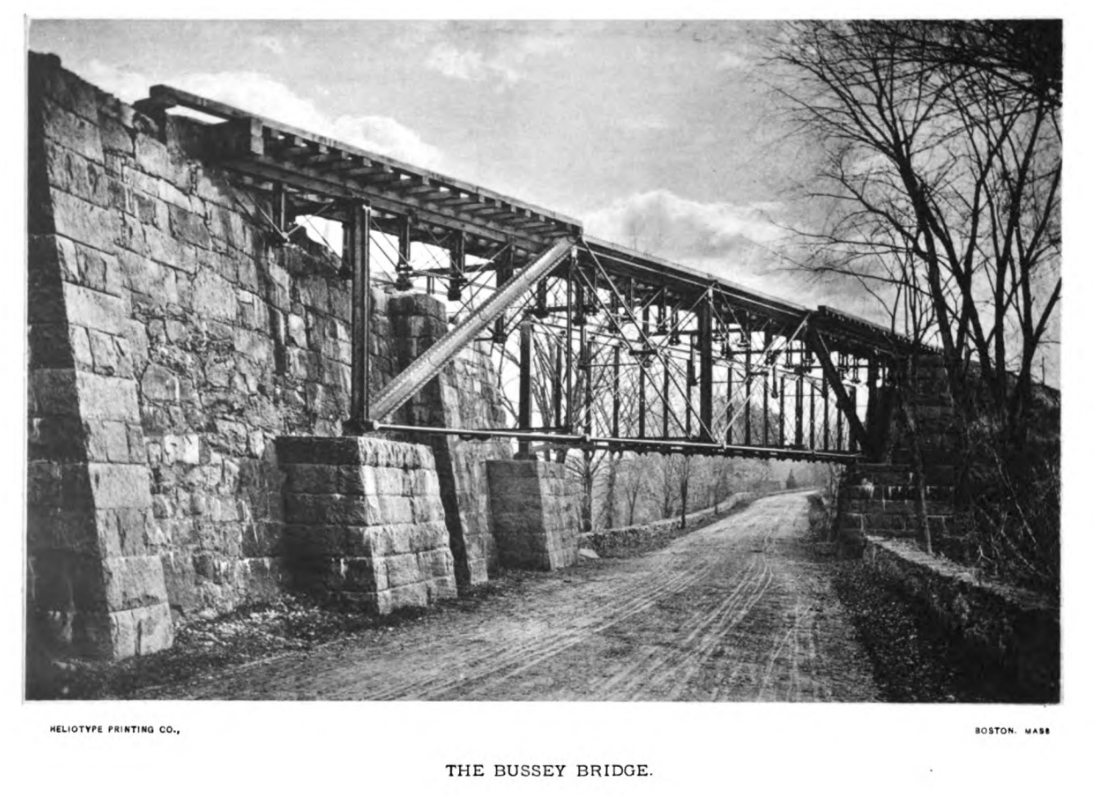
The bridge, prior to the incident; Hewins truss closest

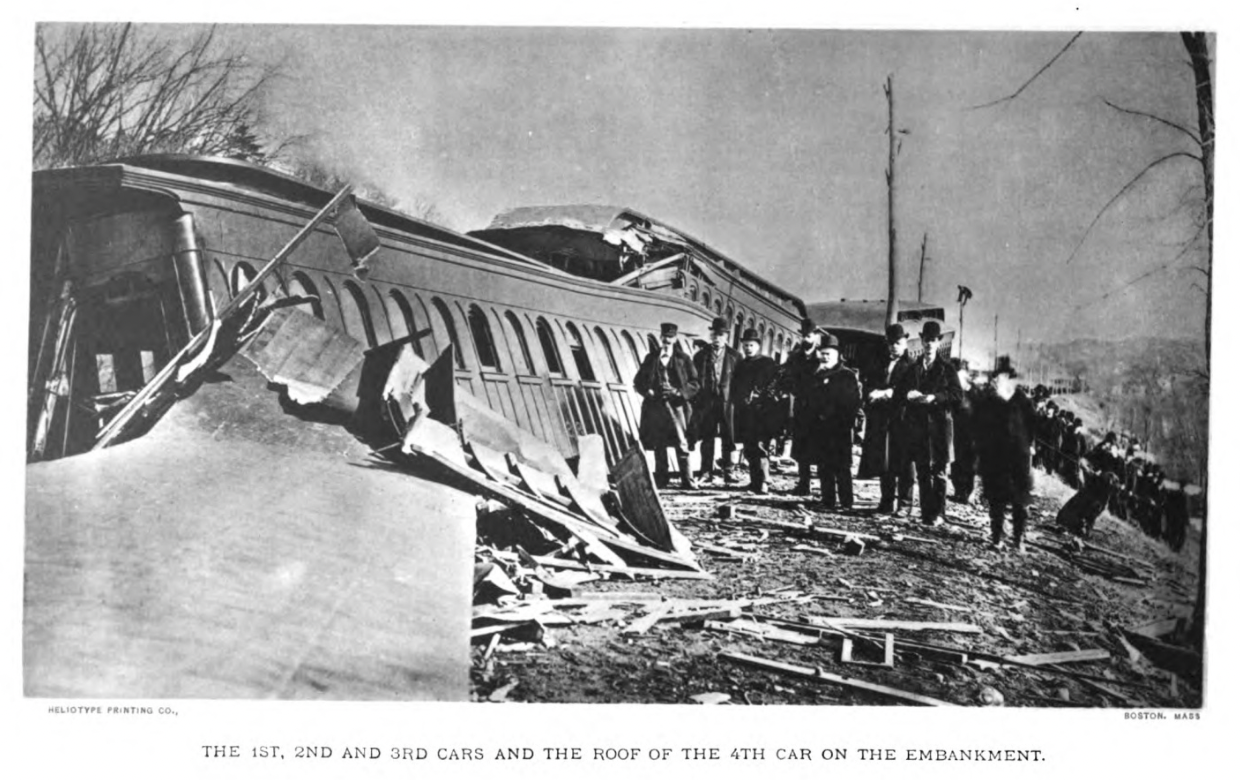
The first three cars, and the roof of the fourth car, on the embankment

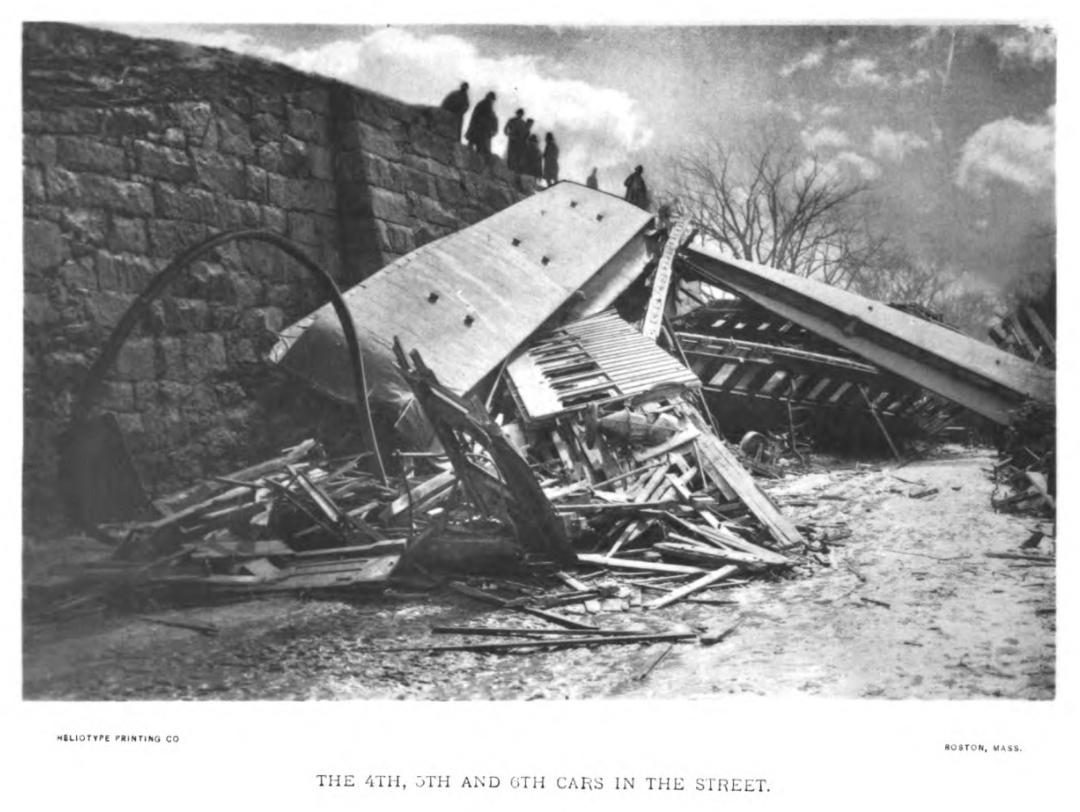
The fourth through sixth cars in the street

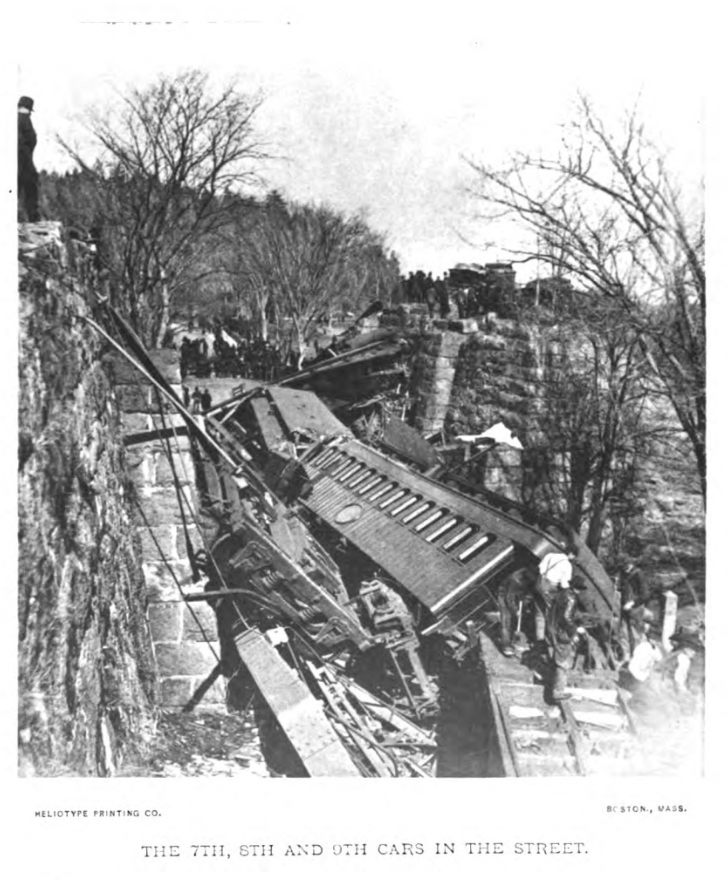
The seventh through ninth cars in the street

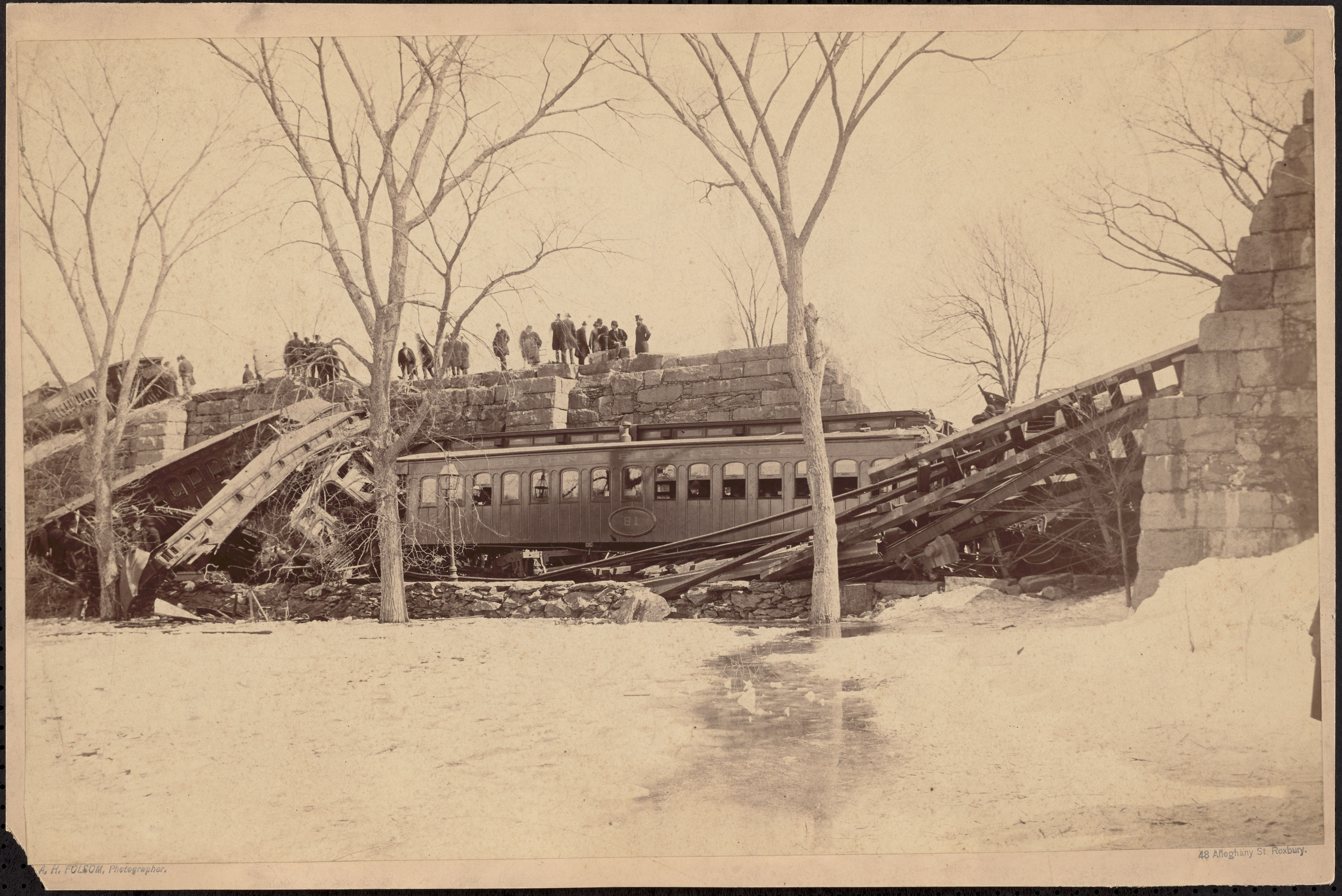
Street-level view of the aftermath—the seventh car (no. 81) at center

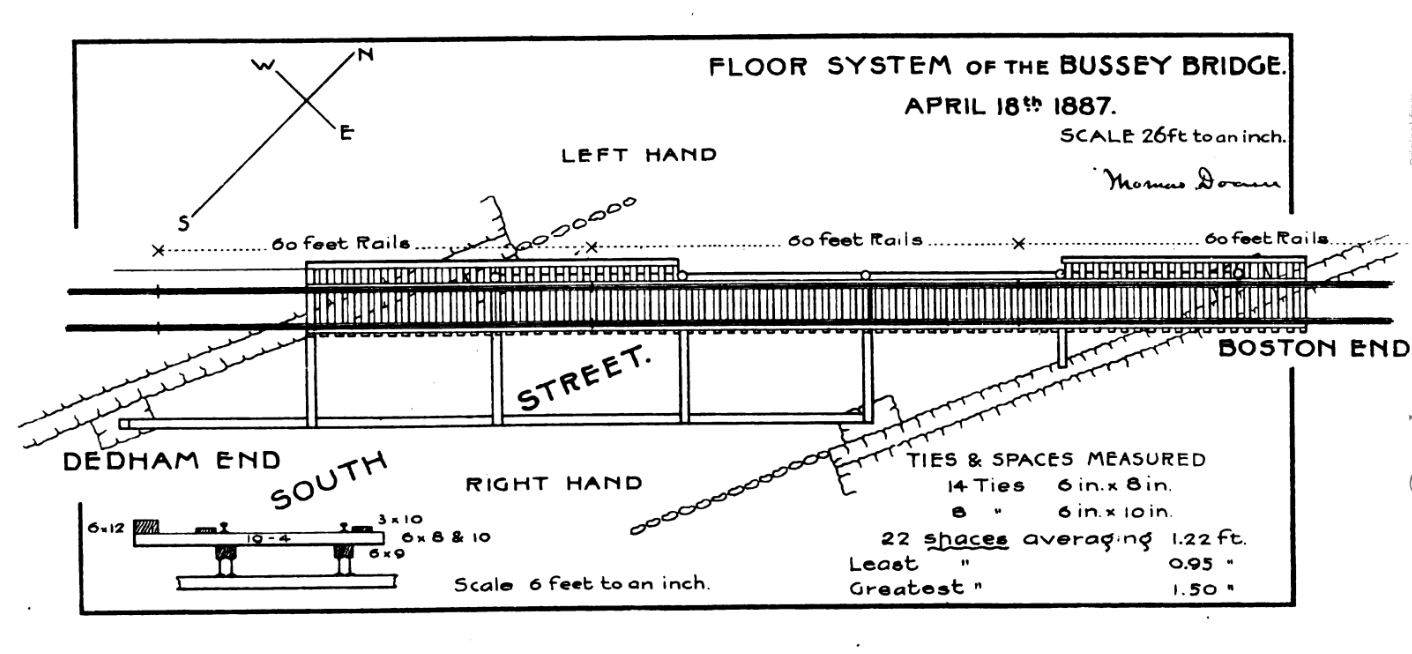
Floor system of the bridge

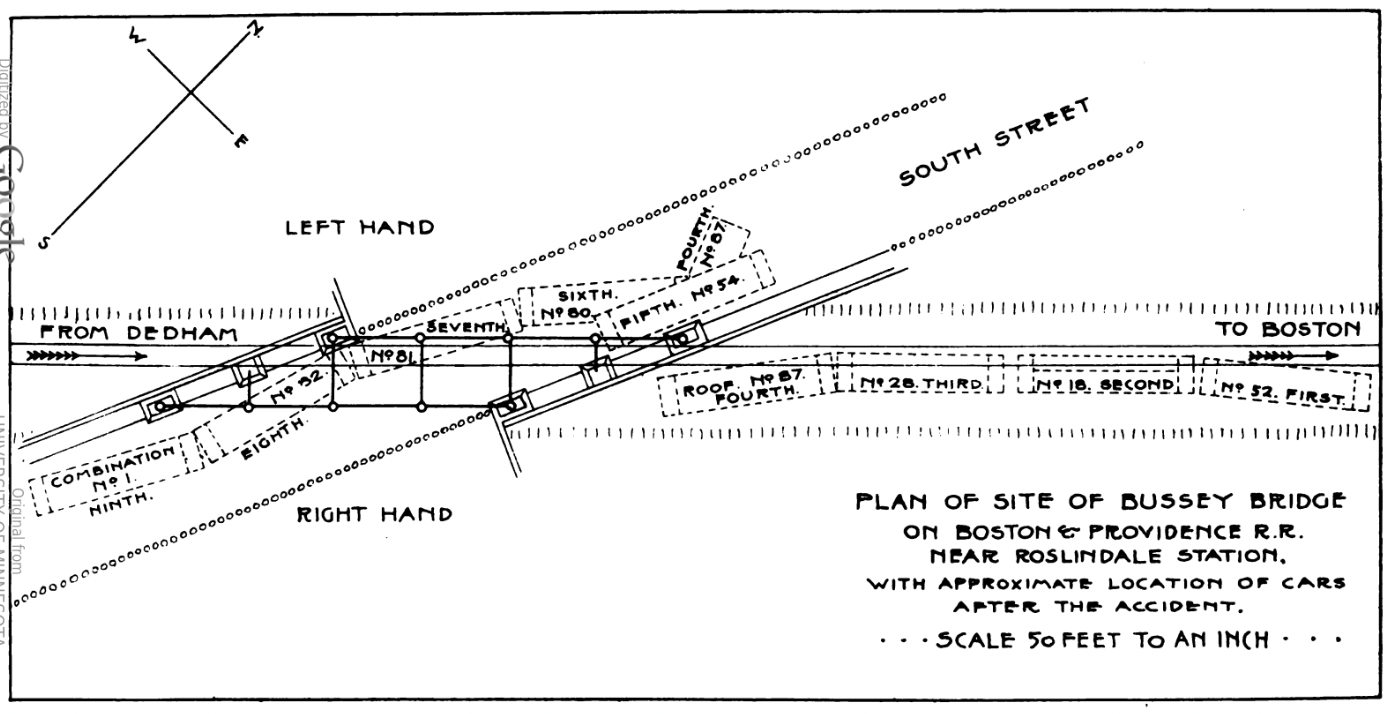
Where the cars came to rest after the accident

== See also ==
- Ashtabula River railroad disaster, another railroad bridge collapse stemming from poor design
- List of disasters in Massachusetts by death toll
