= William Crowninshield Endicott =

American politician (1826–1900)

William Endicott
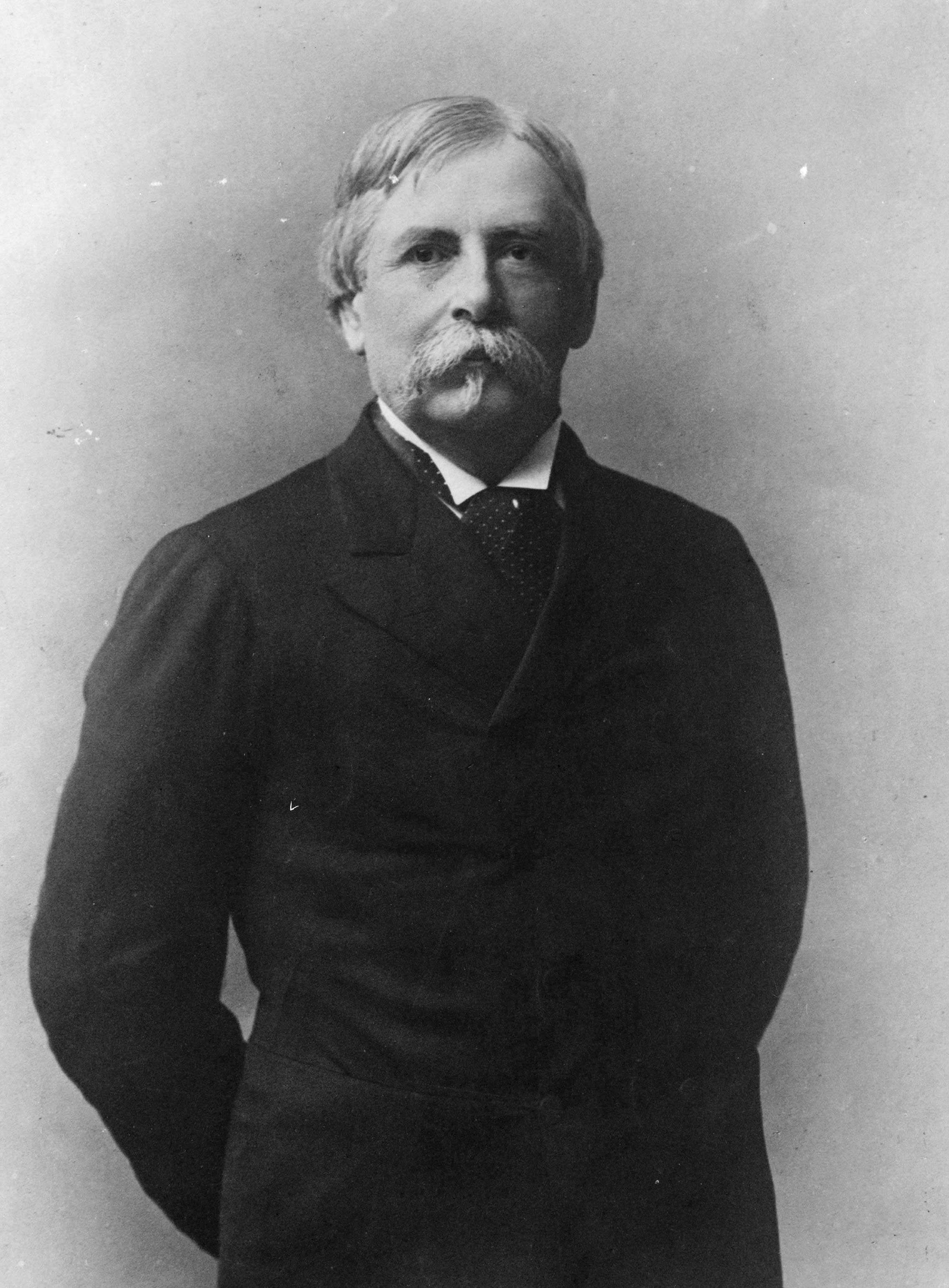
- Photograph of Endicott, c. 1886

36th United States Secretary of War
- In office March 5, 1885 – March 5, 1889
- President: Grover Cleveland
- Preceded by: Robert Todd Lincoln
- Succeeded by: Redfield Proctor

Associate Justice of the Massachusetts Supreme Judicial Court
- In office March 5, 1873 – October 31, 1882
- Appointed by: William B. Washburn
- Preceded by: Seat established
- Succeeded by: Waldo Colburn

Personal details
- Born: November 19, 1826 Salem, Massachusetts, U.S.
- Died: May 6, 1900 (aged 73) Boston, Massachusetts, U.S.
- Party: Whig (formerly); Democratic
- Spouse: Ellen Peabody (m. 1859)
- Education: Harvard University (BA)

William Crowninshield Endicott (November 19, 1826 – May 6, 1900) was an American politician and Secretary of War in the first administration of President Grover Cleveland (1885–1889).

== Early life ==
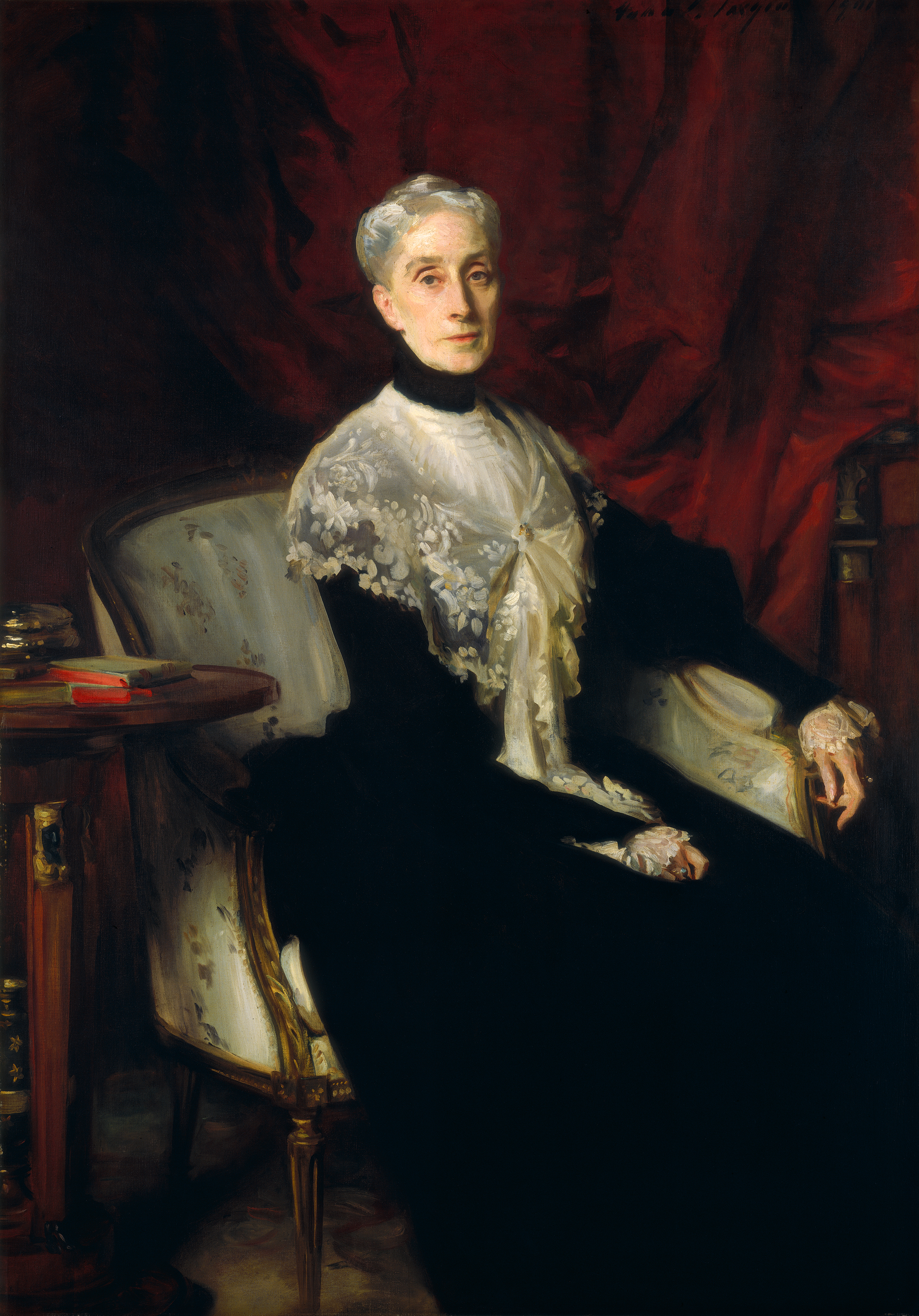
Ellen Peabody Endicott (Mrs. William Crowninshield Endicott), John Singer Sargent, 1901

Endicott was born in Salem, Massachusetts on November 19, 1826. He was a son of William Putnam Endicott and Mary (née Crowninshield) Endicott. He was a direct descendant of the Massachusetts governor, John Endecott, and a first cousin three times removed of another Massachusetts governor, Endicott Peabody.

He graduated from Harvard University in 1847 and attended Harvard Law School in 1849–1850. He studied law with Nathaniel J. Lord prior to his admission to the Massachusetts bar in 1850.

== Career ==
In 1852, he was elected a member of the Salem Common Council and, five years later, became City Solicitor. He was elected a member of the American Antiquarian Society in 1862. In 1853, he entered into a law partnership with J. W. Perry under the name Perry & Endicott, which was dissolved in 1873 upon his appointment to the bench. From 1857 to 1873, also served as president of the Salem Bank.

Endicott, although a Democrat (and originally a Whig), was appointed by Republican governor William B. Washburn to the Massachusetts Supreme Judicial Court, where he served from March 5, 1873 to October 31, 1882. In 1879, he unsuccessfully ran for Congress, followed by an unsuccessful gubernatorial race in 1884. Grover Cleveland appointed Endicott Secretary of War and he served in that capacity in the administration between 1885 and 1889. Endicott oversaw many important changes in the organization of the United States Army, including the establishment of a system of examinations to determine the promotion of officers.

Endicott convened and chaired the Board of Fortifications in 1885 (usually called the Endicott Board), which would provide detailed recommendations and designs for the generation of American coastal defense fortifications constructed in the era of the Spanish–American War. Most of these Endicott Period fortifications served through early World War II.

== Personal life ==
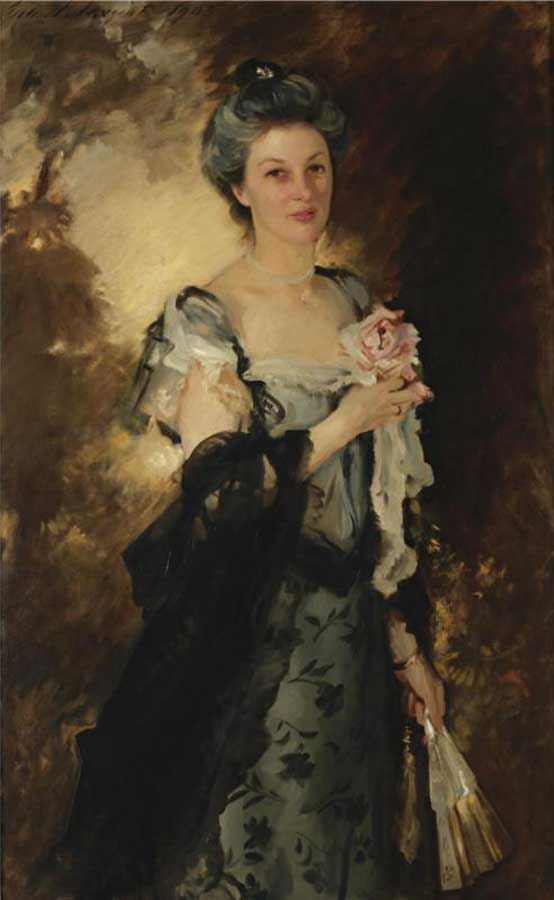
Mrs. William Crowninshield Endicott Jr., John Singer Sargent, 1903

On December 13, 1859, Endicott was married to Ellen Peabody (1833–1927) in Salem. Ellen was the daughter of philanthropist George Peabody and Clarissa Peabody of Salem. Her grandfather was the distinguished Salem ship owner, Joseph Peabody, who made a fortune importing pepper from Sumatra and was one of the wealthiest men in the United States at the time of his death in 1900. Together, William and Ellen had two children:

- William Crowninshield Endicott Jr. (1860–1936), a lawyer who married Marie Louise Thoron (1864–1958), daughter of Joseph Thoron and Anna Barker (née Ward) Thoron, in 1889. William C. Endicott Jr. was the president of the Massachusetts Historical Society for ten years.
- Mary Crowninshield Endicott (1864–1957), who married the British statesman Joseph Chamberlain in 1888. After his death, she married the Anglican clergyman William Hartley Carnegie (1859–1936), in 1916.

Endicott died of acute pneumonia in Boston, Massachusetts on May 6, 1900. His wife lived another twenty-seven years, until her death in Boston on August 20, 1927, after which she was buried with William in the Endicott Lot at Harmony Grove Cemetery in Salem.

Legal offices
New seat	Associate Justice of the Massachusetts Supreme Judicial Court; 1873–1882	Succeeded by Waldo Colburn
Party political offices
Preceded by Benjamin Butler	Democratic nominee for Governor of Massachusetts; 1884	Succeeded by Frederick O. Prince
Political offices
Preceded by Robert Todd Lincoln	United States Secretary of War; 1885–1889	Succeeded by Redfield Proctor
