= Millers Falls Company =

American tool manufacturing company

- Industry: Manufacturing
- Founded: 1868
- Headquarters: Millers Falls, Massachusetts; Alpha, New Jersey
- Key people: Levi J. Gunn, Charles H. Amidon, Henry L. Pratt
- Products: Hand tools

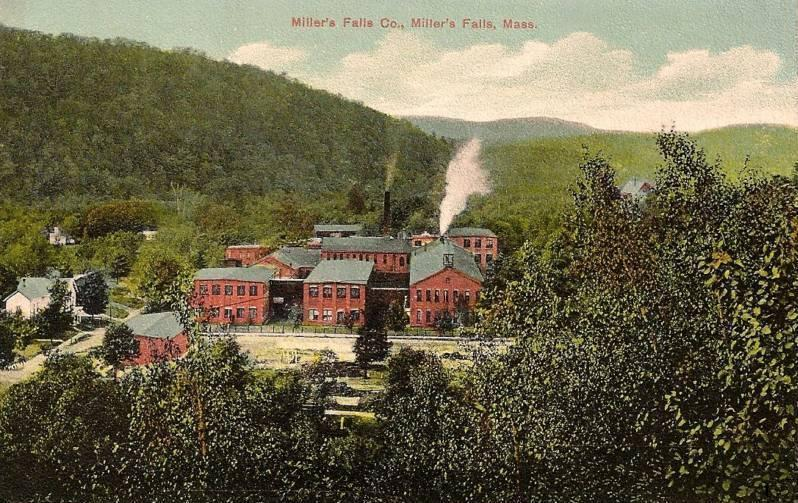
Millers Falls Company in 1910

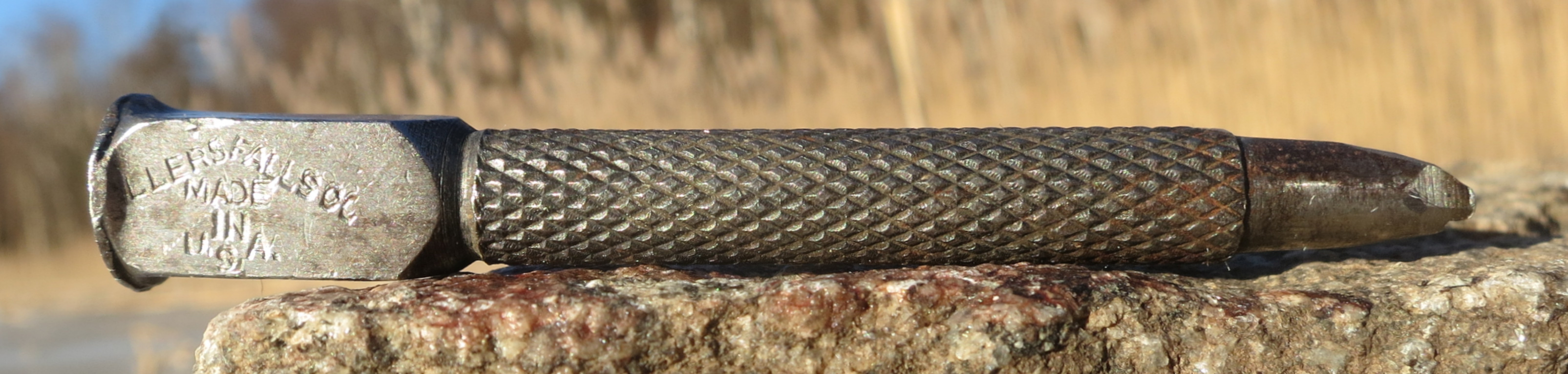
Mid-20th-century center punch by Millers Falls Company

Millers Falls Co. is an American tool manufacturing company originally based in Millers Falls, Massachusetts.

It was established in Greenfield, Massachusetts in 1868 as Gunn & Amidon by Levi J. Gunn and Charles H. Amidon. Gunn and Amidon, along with a third partner, Henry L. Pratt built a factory in the north of Greenfield. After the Greenfield factory burned down, the company was reorganized as the Millers Falls Manufacturing Co. It merged with Backus Vise Co. in 1872 to form Millers Falls Co..

In 1931 Millers Falls tools purchased the majority of the shares of Goodell-Pratt tools and merged with that manufacturer in 1932.

In 1962 the company was acquired by Ingersoll Rand.

In 1982, Ingersoll Rand sold the Millers Falls business to the newly created Millers Falls Tool Co. The company was headquartered in Alpha, New Jersey. Since 2002 the company trademark has belonged to Hangzhou Great Star Industrial, of Hangzhou, China.

== Publications ==
- The catalogue, regularly published, with issues between 1883 and 1992 on record in libraries. OCLC 26652313, OCLC 39795487
- A complete list in miniature of Russell's world renowned scroll saw designs., 1880. OCLC 41665062
- A complete list in miniature of Wild's latest scroll saw designs, 1880. OCLC 41664814
- A complete list in miniature of Bowman's famous scroll saw designs, 1880. OCLC 41664680
- Tool practice : a treatise on the proper use and care of tools, containing information and advice of use to the mechanic, instructive and an inspiration to the apprentice, 1911. OCLC 39395025
- You and your company, 1952. OCLC 50944526
- Hand Tools, 1999. OCLC 44277912
