= Crocker & Brewster =

Publishing house

- Status: Defunct
- Founded: 1818
- Founders: Uriel Crocker, Osmyn Brewster and Samuel Turell Armstrong
- Defunct: 1876
- Country of origin: United States
- Headquarters location: Boston, Massachusetts
- Distribution: Regional - North Eastern United States
- Publication types: Books
- Nonfiction topics: Educational works

Crocker & Brewster (1818–1876) was a leading publishing house in Boston, Massachusetts, during its 58-year existence. The business was located at today's 173–175 Washington Street for nearly half a century; in 1864 it moved to the adjoining building, where it remained until the firm's dissolution.

== History ==
=== Foundation and early years ===
The firm was founded by Uriel Crocker and Osmyn Brewster, with the participation of their earlier employer, Samuel Turell Armstrong, later mayor of Boston and acting governor of the Commonwealth. In 1815, Crocker was made foreman of Armstrong's printing office, and in 1818 was, with his fellow-apprentice, Brewster, taken into partnership with Armstrong. The trio agreed that the bookstore would be named for Mr. Armstrong and the printing office for Crocker & Brewster.

In 1821 a branch of the business was established in New York City. Five years later, it was sold to Daniel Appleton and Jonathan Leavitt, becoming the foundation of the firm, D. Appleton & Sons.

=== Crocker & Brewster ===
After 1825, the entire business was carried on under the name of Crocker & Brewster, although Armstrong continued to be a member of the firm until 1840. The printing office was then in Mr. Crocker's charge and the bookstore in Mr. Brewster's. The firm thrived with strong sales until 1876, when it relinquished its active publishing business to H. O. Houghton and Company, which purchased its stereotype plates, copyrights, and book stock. H. O. Houghton later became Houghton Mifflin. The partnership between Armstrong, Crocker, and Brewster was not dissolved until Crocker's death in 1887.

== Publications ==
The firm published mainly standards and educational works, including Scott's Family Bible in six royal octavo volumes, the first large work stereotyped in the United States.

Over 150 items printed by Crocker & Brewster are in the collection of the Boston Athenaeum.
