= George G. Crocker =

American politician

George Glover Crocker
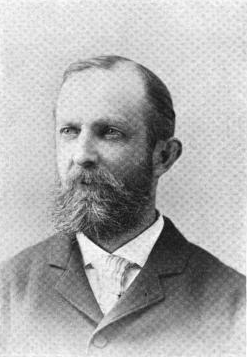

Chairman of the Massachusetts State Board of Railroad Commissioners
- In office February 1887 – January 1892

Member of the Massachusetts State Board of Railroad Commissioners
- In office February 1887 – January 1892

President of the Massachusetts Senate
- In office 1883–1883
- Preceded by: Robert R. Bishop
- Succeeded by: George A. Bruce

Member of the Massachusetts Senate
- In office 1880–1883

Member of the Massachusetts House of Representatives
- In office 1873–1874

Personal details
- Born: December 15, 1843 Boston, Massachusetts, U.S.
- Died: May 26, 1913 (aged 69) Cohasset, Massachusetts, U.S.
- Party: Republican
- Spouse(s): Annie Bliss Keep; m. June 19, 1875
- Children: Courtenay Crocker, Margaret Crocker, Lyneham Crocker, Muriel Crocker
- Education: Boston Latin School, 1860; Harvard College, 1864; Harvard Law School, 1866
- Occupation: Lawyer
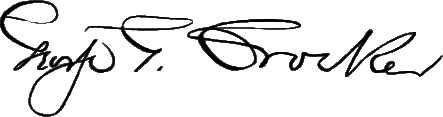
- Signature

George Glover Crocker (December 15, 1843 – May 26, 1913) was an American politician and attorney in Massachusetts. He served in the Massachusetts House of Representatives and in the Massachusetts Senate, later becoming president of the Senate. He was a member of the Republican Party.

== Early life ==
Crocker was born in Boston, Massachusetts, on December 15, 1843, to Uriel Crocker and Sarah Kidder (Haskell) Crocker. He attended Harvard College and Harvard Law School.

== Career ==
Crocker was admitted to the Massachusetts bar in Suffolk County on July 3, 1867. A member of the Republican Party, Crocker was later elected to the Massachusetts House of Representatives, serving from 1873 to 1874. He was later elected to the Massachusetts Senate, serving from 1880 to 1883, and was president of the Senate in 1883.

Crocker later became a member and chairman of the Massachusetts State Board of Railroad Commissioners. He was one of the authors of the board's report on the Forest Hills disaster, which occurred in March 1887.

== Death and legacy ==
He died at his summer home in Cohasset on May 26, 1913, aged 69.

== See also ==
- 102nd Massachusetts General Court (1881)
- 104th Massachusetts General Court (1883)

Political offices
Preceded by Robert R. Bishop	President of the Massachusetts Senate; 1883	Succeeded by George A. Bruce
