= Levi J. Gunn =

American politician

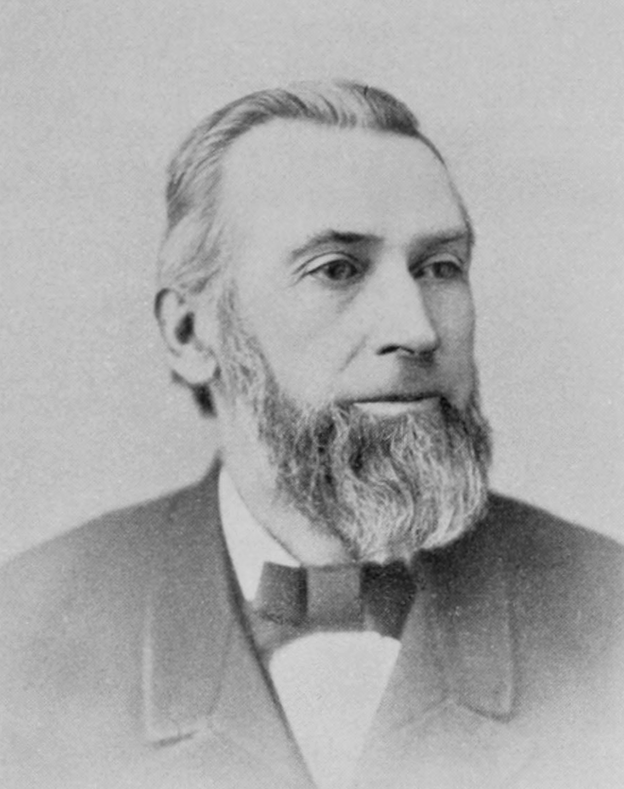

Member of the Massachusetts Executive Council
- In office 1888–1889

Member of the Massachusetts Senate
- In office 1886–1887

Member of the Greenfield, Massachusetts Board of Selectmen

Personal details
- Born: June 2, 1830 Conway, Massachusetts
- Died: September 9, 1916 (aged 86) Greenfield, Massachusetts
- Spouse(s): Esther C. Graves, d. 1897; Catherine Graves, m. July 27, 1899
- Children: L. Walter Gunn

Levi J. Gunn (June 2, 1830 – September 9, 1916) was an American manufacturer and politician who was one of the founders of the Millers Falls Company, a member of the Massachusetts Senate and in the Massachusetts Executive Council.

== See also ==
- 106th Massachusetts General Court (1885)

Political offices
Preceded by	Member of the Massachusetts Executive Council; 1888–1889	Succeeded by
