= Francis W. Rockwell (politician) =

American politician

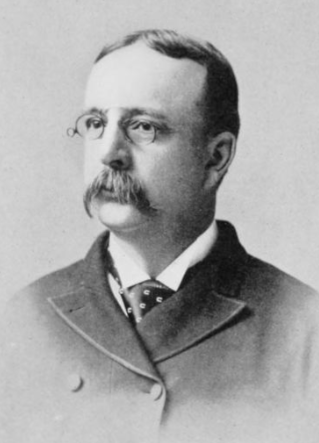

Member of the U.S. House of Representatives from Massachusetts's 12th district
- In office January 17, 1884 – March 3, 1891
- Preceded by: George D. Robinson
- Succeeded by: John Crawford Crosby

Member of the Massachusetts Senate
- In office 1881–1882

Member of the Massachusetts House of Representatives
- In office 1879

Personal details
- Born: May 26, 1844 Pittsfield, Massachusetts, US
- Died: June 26, 1929 (aged 85) Pittsfield, Massachusetts, US
- Party: Republican
- Spouse: Mary Gilbert Davis
- Children: William Walker, Henry Davis, Samuel Forbes, Julius, Lawrence Dowse, Francis W. and Elizabeth
- Education: Amherst College; Harvard Law School

Francis Williams Rockwell (May 26, 1844 – June 26, 1929) was a United States representative from Massachusetts. Born in Pittsfield, Massachusetts, his father was Julius Rockwell, also a member of Congress.

Rockwell attended the public schools and Edwards Place School Stockbridge. He graduated from Amherst College in 1868 and from the law department of Harvard University in 1871; he commenced the practice of law in Pittsfield in 1871. He was appointed one of the special justices of the district court of central Berkshire in 1873, resigning in 1875. He served in the Massachusetts House of Representatives in 1879, and served in the Massachusetts Senate in 1881 and 1882.

Rockwell was elected as a Republican to the Forty-eighth Congress to fill the vacancy caused by the resignation of George D. Robinson; he was reelected to the Forty-ninth, Fiftieth, and Fifty-first Congresses and served from January 17, 1884, to March 3, 1891. He was an unsuccessful candidate for reelection in 1890 to the Fifty-second Congress, and resumed the practice of law in Pittsfield until 1916 when he retired. From 1893 to 1916 he was president of the City Savings Bank 1893–1916, and was a delegate to the Republican National Convention in 1900. He was a member of the Greylock Reservation Commission from 1898 to 1926.

He died at his home in Pittsfield on June 26, 1929, and was interred in Pittsfield Cemetery.

== See also ==
- 102nd Massachusetts General Court (1881)

U.S. House of Representatives
Preceded by George D. Robinson	Member of the U.S. House of Representatives from Massachusetts's 1st congressional district 1884–1891	Succeeded by John C. Crosby
