= Frederick O. Prince =

American politician (1818–1899)

Frederick Octavius Prince
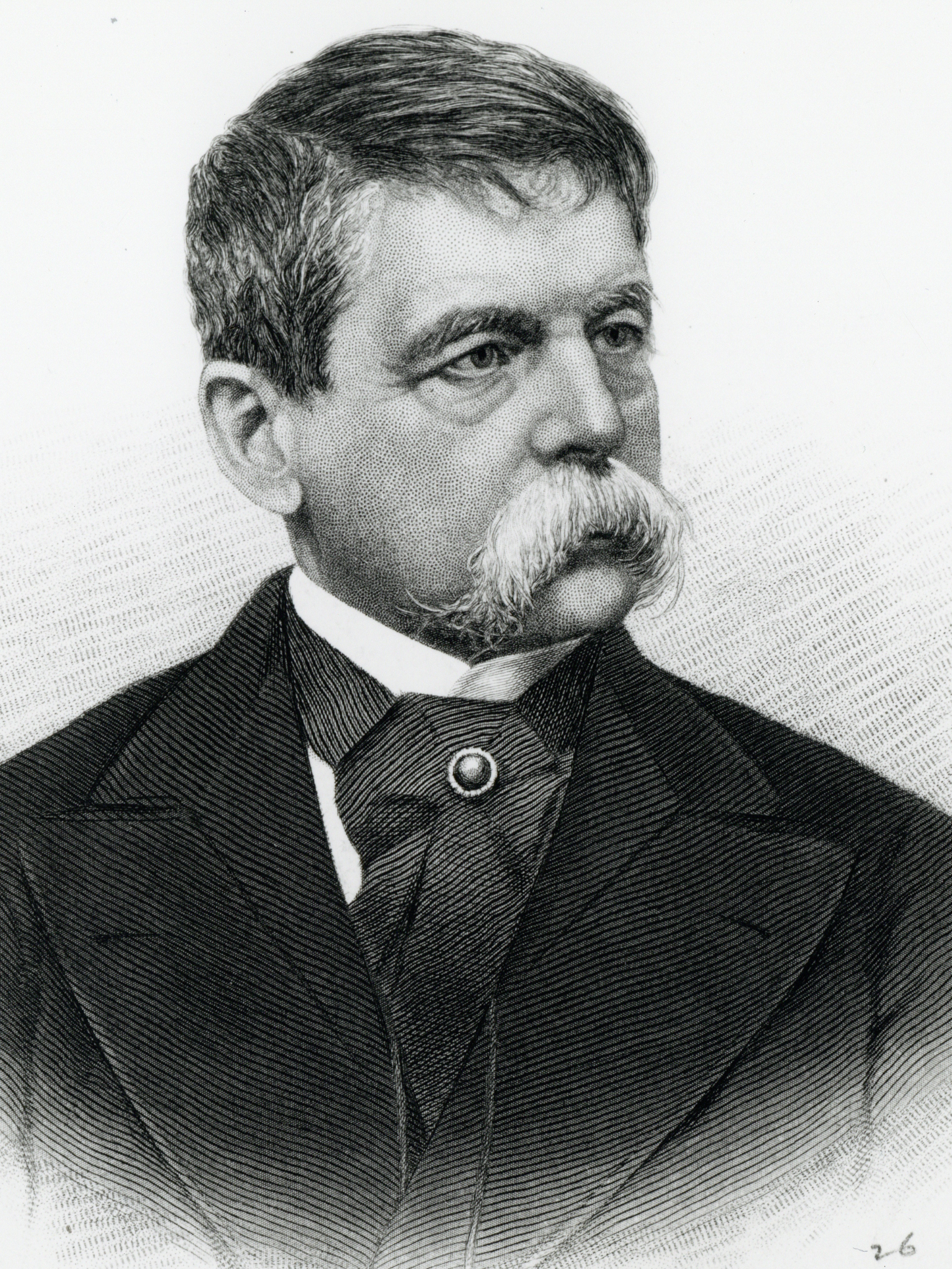

Mayor of Boston
- In office 1879–1882
- Preceded by: Henry L. Pierce
- Succeeded by: Samuel A. Green
- In office 1877–1878
- Preceded by: Samuel C. Cobb
- Succeeded by: Henry L. Pierce

Member of the Massachusetts State Senate
- In office 1854

Member of the Massachusetts Constitutional Convention of 1853
- In office 1854

Member of the Massachusetts House of Representatives
- In office 1851–1853

Personal details
- Born: January 18, 1818 Boston, Massachusetts, U.S.
- Died: June 6, 1899 (aged 81) Boston, Massachusetts, U.S.
- Party: Whig Party; Democratic
- Spouse: Helen Henry (d. 1885)
- Relations: 5 sons, 1 daughter
- Education: Harvard College
- Occupation: Lawyer

Frederick Octavius Prince (January 18, 1818 – June 6, 1899) was an American lawyer, politician, and mayor of Boston, Massachusetts.

He was the father of financier Frederick H. Prince.

== Early life ==
Frederick Prince was born in Boston, Massachusetts on January 18, 1818, the son of Thomas J. and Caroline (née Prince) Prince. He was "of English stock on one side and Scotch on the other, and his ancestors were among the earliest settlers in New England." An ancestor of his, John Prince, migrated from Hull in 1633.

He was educated at Boston Latin School and graduated from Harvard College in 1836. He studied law at the office of Dexter & Gardiner and was admitted to the bar in 1840.

== Career ==
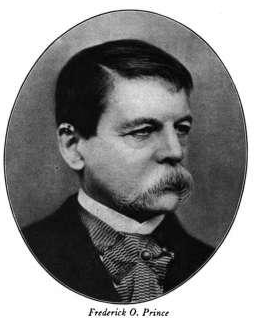
Prince as Mayor

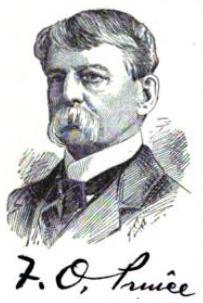
Sketch of Prince

He engaged in politics as a member of the Whig Party. Prince was elected to the Massachusetts House of Representatives in 1851 and served for three years. He became quite popular due to his eloquent speeches on reform. He was a prominent participant in the Massachusetts Constitutional Convention of 1853. In 1854, he was elected to the Massachusetts Senate.

After the Whig Party dissolved in 1860, Prince joined the Democratic Party. He was a delegate to the 1860 Democratic National Convention and was unanimously elected secretary of the convention. He served as secretary until 1888.

=== Mayor of Boston ===
In 1876, Prince was elected Mayor of Boston, serving in 1877. He was defeated for re-election that year, but returned to office in 1879, serving until 1881.

During his tenure as mayor, Prince oversaw improvements to the city's sewer system and the development of the city's park system. At the end of Mayor Prince's incumbency, the most important projects before the city were the erection of the new Court House, the Public Library building, and the establishment of public parks in different parts of the city. The Boston Latin and English High School buildings were also erected due to his influence. He was relatively frugal during his first time as mayor but spent quite a lot on improving the East Boston ferries in his second. In 1880, the city government celebrated the 250th anniversary of the settlement of Boston. On this occasion the statue of John Winthrop was unveiled on Scollay Square.

=== Later life ===
After serving as mayor, Prince became a trustee of the Boston Public Library and served as president of its board of trustees for 11 years. During his trusteeship, he advocated and oversaw the construction of the library's McKim Building in Copley Square. In 1879 Prince was named an Honorary Member of the American Library Association, the first year the award was bestowed. Prince was the Democratic nominee for Governor of Massachusetts in 1885 and 1896, losing both times.

== Personal life ==
In 1848, Prince married Helen Susan Henry (1824–1885), a daughter of Bernard Henry of Philadelphia, the former U.S. Consul to Gibraltar from 1816 to 1832. After their marriage, they took residence in Winchester, Massachusetts and had one daughter and five sons, including:

- Gordon Prince (1849–1902), who married Lillian Chickering, a daughter of Col. Thomas Edward Chickering.
- Bernard Prince (b. c. 1849), who died young.
- Charles Albert Prince (1852–1943), who married Helen Choate Pratt, daughter of Edward Ellerton Pratt and granddaughter of U.S. Senator Rufus Choate, in 1881.
- Morton Prince (1854–1929), a physician who married Frances "Fannie" Lithgow Payson, daughter of Arthur Lithgow Payson and Claire Endicott Peabody. They divorced and she later married Roger Wolcott (son of Gov. Roger Wolcott), and Stedman Shumway Hanks.
- Helen Susan Prince (1857–1880), who died unmarried at age 22.
- Frederick Henry Prince (1858–1953), a financier who married Abigail Norman, daughter of George H. Norman of Newport.

In Boston, they lived at 311 Beacon in the Back Bay. After the death of his wife in 1885, Prince married the widow of Samuel P. Blanc, a "distinguished member of the bar of New Orleans" in 1899.

Frederick Prince died in Boston on June 6, 1899.

=== Legacy ===
A bust of Frederick Prince now stands in the Cushman Room of the Boston Public Library.

He was awarded American Library Association Honorary Membership in 1879.

== See also ==
- Timeline of Boston, 1870s-1880s

Party political offices
Preceded by William Crowninshield Endicott	Democratic nominee for Governor of Massachusetts; 1885	Succeeded by John F. Andrew
Political offices
Preceded by Samuel C. Cobb	Mayor of Boston, Massachusetts; January 1, 1877–January 7, 1878	Succeeded by Henry L. Pierce
Preceded by Henry L. Pierce	Mayor of Boston, Massachusetts; January 6, 1879–January 2, 1882	Succeeded by Samuel Abbott Green
