= George A. Bruce =

American politician

George Anson Bruce
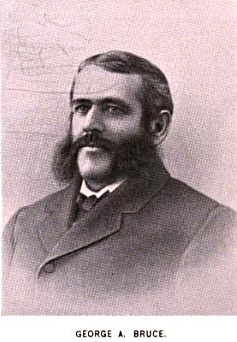

President of the Massachusetts Senate
- In office 1884–1884
- Preceded by: George G. Crocker
- Succeeded by: Albert E. Pillsbury

Member of the Massachusetts Senate First Middlesex District
- In office 1882–1884
- Preceded by: Elisha S. Converse
- Succeeded by: Eliazer Boynton

Fourth Mayor of Somerville, Massachusetts
- In office January 1878 – January 1881
- Preceded by: Austin Belknap
- Succeeded by: John A. Cummings

Member of the Somerville, Massachusetts Board of Aldermen Ward 2
- In office January 1876 – January 1877

Member of the New Hampshire House of Representatives
- In office 1866–1866

Personal details
- Born: November 19, 1839 Mont Vernon, New Hampshire, U.S.
- Died: January 31, 1929 (aged 89) Brookline, Massachusetts, U.S.
- Party: Republican
- Spouse: Clara M. Hall
- Children: Clara Augusta Hall, born November 19, 1882.
- Education: Dartmouth, class of 1861
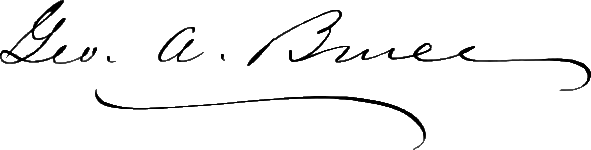
- Signature

Military service
- Allegiance: United States of America; Union
- Branch/service: Union Army
- Years of service: August 1862-July 3, 1865
- Rank: Private, First Lieutenant, 1862; Major, (1864); Lieutenant Colonel, (1865).
- Unit: Thirteenth New Hampshire Volunteers
- Battles/wars: American Civil War; *Richmond-Petersburg Campaign; *Capture of Fort Richmond at the Battle of Chaffin's Farm

George Anson Bruce (November 19, 1839 – January 31, 1929) was an American politician who served as a member of the New Hampshire House of Representatives, on the Board of Aldermen and as the fourth Mayor of Somerville, Massachusetts; and as a member, and President of, the Massachusetts Senate.

== Early life ==
Bruce was born to Nathaniel and Lucy (Butterfield) Bruce in Mont Vernon, New Hampshire on November 19, 1839.

== Family ==
Bruce married Clara M. Hall of Groton, Massachusetts, they had one daughter, Clara Augusta, who was born November 19, 1882.

George A. Bruce died in Brookline, Massachusetts on January 31, 1929, at 89 years of age.

== Writings ==
- The capture and occupation of Richmond (1900).
- twentieth regiment of Massachusetts volunteer infantry, 1861-1865 (1906).

== See also ==
- 105th Massachusetts General Court (1884)

== Notes ==
Political offices
Preceded by Austin Belknap	4th Mayor of Somerville, Massachusetts; January 1878-1880	Succeeded by John A. Cummings
Preceded by George G. Crocker	President of the Massachusetts Senate; 1884—1884	Succeeded by Albert E. Pillsbury
