= Albert E. Pillsbury =

Boston lawyer

Albert Enoch Pillsbury
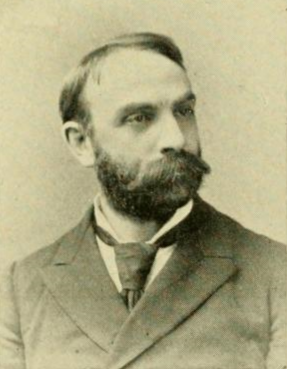

17th Massachusetts Attorney General
- In office 1891–1894
- Governor: William E. Russell
- Preceded by: Andrew J. Waterman
- Succeeded by: Hosea M. Knowlton

President of the Massachusetts Senate
- In office 1885–1886
- Preceded by: George A. Bruce
- Succeeded by: Halsey J. Boardman

Member of the Massachusetts Senate from the 6th Suffolk district
- In office 1884–1886

Member of the Massachusetts House of Representatives
- In office 1876–1878

Personal details
- Born: August 19, 1849 Milford, New Hampshire, U.S.
- Died: December 23, 1930 (aged 81) Newton, Massachusetts, U.S.
- Party: Republican
- Spouse(s): Louisa Fuller (Johnson) Wheeler, m. July 9, 1889. Elizabeth Mooney, m. July 1, 1905
- Children: Elizabeth Dinsmoor, b. July 21, 1907; Parker Webster, b. March 17, 1910
- Education: Lawrence Academy, Harvard College class of 1871
- Profession: Attorney
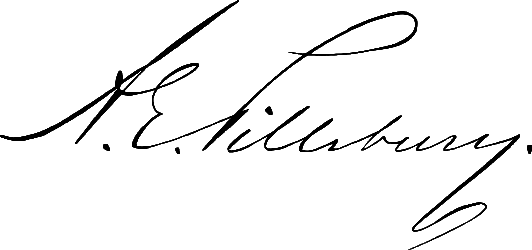
- Signature

Albert Enoch Pillsbury (August 19, 1849 – December 23, 1930) was a Boston lawyer who served in both houses of the Massachusetts legislature, president of the Massachusetts State Senate, and as the Attorney General of Massachusetts from 1891 to 1894. In addition to being a member of the National Negro Committee, the precursor to the NAACP, Pillsbury was a member of the Boston Committee to Advance the Cause of the Negro, which in 1911 became a branch of the NAACP. It was Pillsbury who drafted the bylaws of the NAACP. In 1913, he resigned his membership in the American Bar Association when that organization rejected the membership of William H. Lewis, a black assistant U.S. attorney and supporter of Booker T. Washington. In 1913, Pillsbury was awarded an honorary LL.D. degree from Howard University. It was there he delivered his speech illuminating, defending and praising President Lincoln's role in ending slavery that became a small book, Lincoln and Slavery.

== 1917 Massachusetts Constitutional Convention ==
In 1916 the Massachusetts legislature and electorate approved a calling of a Constitutional Convention. In May 1917 Pillsbury was elected to serve as a member of the Massachusetts Constitutional Convention of 1917, representing the Ninth Norfolk District of the Massachusetts House of Representatives.

He was the nephew of abolitionist Parker Pillsbury.

== See also ==
- 1876 Massachusetts legislature
- 1877 Massachusetts legislature
- 1878 Massachusetts legislature
- 1885 Massachusetts legislature
- 1886 Massachusetts legislature

== Footnotes ==
Legal offices
Preceded by Andrew J. Waterman	Attorney General of Massachusetts; 1891–1894	Succeeded by Hosea M. Knowlton
Political offices
Preceded by George A. Bruce	President of the Massachusetts Senate; 1885 — 1886	Succeeded by Halsey J. Boardman
