= George A. Marden =

American politician

George Augustus Marden
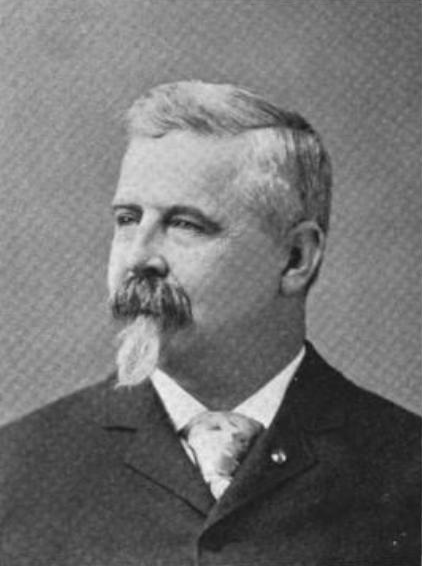

Assistant Treasurer of the United States for the Boston sub-treasury
- In office April 1, 1899 – December 19, 1906
- Preceded by: Joseph H. O'Neil

Massachusetts Treasurer
- In office 1889–1894
- Governor: Oliver Ames; John Q. A. Brackett; William E. Russell
- Preceded by: Alanson W. Beard
- Succeeded by: Henry W. Phillips

Speaker of the Massachusetts House of Representatives
- In office 1883–1884
- Preceded by: Charles J. Noyes
- Succeeded by: John Q. A. Brackett

Personal details
- Born: August 9, 1839 Mont Vernon, New Hampshire, U.S.
- Died: December 19, 1906 (aged 67) Lowell, Massachusetts, U.S.
- Party: Republican
- Spouse: Mary P. Fiske
- Education: Appleton Academy, Dartmouth College, 1861
- Profession: Attorney, journalist

Military service
- Allegiance: United States of America; Union
- Branch/service: Union Army
- Years of service: December 1861 – September 1864
- Unit: Second Regiment Berdan's Sharpshooters; First Regiment Berdan's Sharpshooters; 2nd United States Volunteer Sharpshooter Regiment; Third Brigade, Third Division Third Army Corps

George Augustus Marden (August 9, 1839 – December 19, 1906) was an American journalist, attorney and politician who served as Massachusetts Treasurer and as assistant treasurer of the United States for the Boston subtreasury.

== Biography ==
George A. Marden was born in Mont Vernon, New Hampshire on August 9, 1839. He attended Appleton Academy, and graduated from Dartmouth College in 1861.

He worked for the Concord Monitor, and The Boston Advertiser. Marston also was the editor and part owner of the Lowell Courier.

He was sworn in as assistant treasurer of the United States for the Boston subtreasury on April 1, 1899.

He died at his home in Lowell, Massachusetts on December 19, 1906.

== See also ==
- 1873 Massachusetts legislature
- 1883 Massachusetts legislature

Massachusetts House of Representatives
Preceded by Charles J. Noyes	Speaker of the Massachusetts House of Representatives; 1883 — 1884	Succeeded by John Q. A. Brackett
Political offices
Preceded by Alanson W. Beard	Massachusetts Treasurer; 1889 — 1894	Succeeded by Henry M. Phillips
