= George D. Robinson =

American politician (1834–1896)

George Dexter Robinson
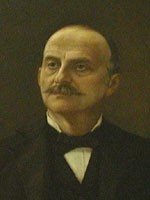
- Portrait c. 1900

34th Governor of Massachusetts
- In office January 3, 1884 – January 6, 1887
- Lieutenant: Oliver Ames
- Preceded by: Benjamin Butler
- Succeeded by: Oliver Ames

Member of the U.S. House of Representatives from Massachusetts
- In office March 4, 1877 – January 7, 1884
- Preceded by: Chester W. Chapin
- Succeeded by: Francis W. Rockwell
- Constituency: 11th district (1877–83); 12th district (1883–84)

Member of the Massachusetts Senate from the 2nd Hampden district
- In office January 5, 1876 – January 3, 1877
- Preceded by: Henry Fuller
- Succeeded by: Henry C. Ewing

Member of the Massachusetts House of Representatives
- In office 1874

Personal details
- Born: George Washington Robinson; January 20, 1834 Lexington, Massachusetts
- Died: February 22, 1896 (aged 62) Chicopee, Massachusetts
- Party: Republican
- Spouses: Hannah Stevens (m. 1859; died 1864) Susan Simonds (m. 1867)
- Education: Harvard College

George Dexter Robinson (born George Washington Robinson; January 20, 1834 – February 22, 1896) was an American lawyer and Republican politician from Chicopee, Massachusetts. After serving in the Massachusetts General Court and United States House of Representatives, Robinson served three one-year terms as Governor of Massachusetts, notably defeating Benjamin Franklin Butler in the 1883 election.

After leaving office, his most famous legal client was Lizzie Borden, notoriously accused of killing her father and stepmother. She was acquitted in a highly sensationalized trial.

Born in Lexington and educated at Harvard, Robinson taught high school before becoming a lawyer. He gained a reputation as a fine Parliamentarian while serving in Congress. As governor, he promoted the passage of civil service reform legislation and labor-friendly wage and dispute-resolution laws. He aligned with the state's industrial leaders against public health advocates, and banned discrimination in the issuance of life insurance policies. As a lawyer, he gained notoriety for Borden's defense, and was criticized for defending fraudulent fraternal benefit societies.

== Early years ==
George Washington Robinson was born in Lexington, Massachusetts to Charles and Mary (Davis) Robinson. The son of farmers, he attended Lexington Academy and Hopkins Classical School in Cambridge, and graduated from Harvard University in 1856. While at Harvard he was admitted to the Zeta Psi fraternity. In 1855, he had his name legally changed to "George Dexter Robinson", supposedly because someone else in Lexington had a similar name to his.

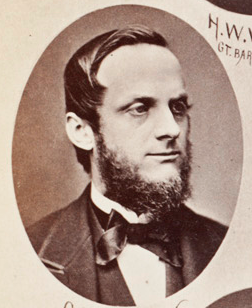
Robinson as a member of the Massachusetts House of Representatives

Although he had intended to study medicine, Robinson entered the teaching profession, serving as the principal of Chicopee High School in Chicopee, Massachusetts from 1856 to 1865. During this time, he engaged in some study of medicine. In 1865, he engaged in the study of law with his brother, and was admitted to the bar in 1866, opening a practice in Chicopee.

Robinson entered politics in 1873, winning election to the Massachusetts House of Representatives as a Republican. He was then elected to the Massachusetts Senate in 1875, in each case representing Chicopee. He served on judiciary committees in both chambers, as well as a committee on constitutional amendments in the Senate. Robinson was one of a small number of legislators who refused free travel passes offered by the railroads.

In 1876, Robinson was elected to the United States House of Representatives, where he served most of four terms. He gained a reputation in the chamber as an experienced Parliamentarian and debater. He sat on a number of committees, including the House Judiciary Committee, and was considered a "doer" who moved the business of the body forward.

== Governor ==
While serving in Congress, Robinson was nominated to run for Governor of Massachusetts in 1883, against the colorful incumbent Democrat Benjamin Butler. He ran on a platform of civil service reform (seeking to deal with issues of patronage), and defeated Butler by 10,000 votes. Robinson served three terms, winning by wider margins against other opponents. He was generally regarded as a fiscal conservative. During his tenure, legislation was enacted banning discrimination in the issuance of life insurance policies. He proposed successful legislation to extend free public education to every student, and required that textbooks be provided to each student free of charge. He also signed legislation requiring that corporations pay workers weekly, and established the state's first Board of Arbitration, which resolved disputes between workers and employers. A civil service reform bill, at the time the strictest in the nation, passed in 1884. It required even laborers hired by state and municipal governments to have minimal certification from a civil service commission established for the purpose. This effectively reduced certain types of patronage dispensed by elected officials, and may have been a Republican move to curtail the growing power of predominantly Democratic Irish-American urban party bosses. An attempt to weaken the civil service reform, by exempting veterans from its requirements, was vetoed by Robinson in 1886.

One controversy that Robinson inherited from the Butler administration concerned the state's board of health, charity and lunacy. This board had been created by merging several previously independent boards, and Butler had appointed as its chairman an activist concerned with industrial pollution. Butler had made this appointment following criticism that its public health mission had been diluted by the merger. The state's textile and manufacturing interests, hostile to the board's calls for more significant pollution control legislation, prevailed on Robinson to replace the chairman with a more business-friendly choice. A petition campaign by activists followed, prompting Robinson to separate the public health functions into a separate board.

Robinson refused to run for reelection in 1886, and resumed the practice of law in Springfield. He refused an offer from Grover Cleveland of a seat on the Interstate Commerce Commission in 1887, and a seat on the Cherokee Commission from Benjamin Harrison in 1889. He was elected a member of the American Antiquarian Society in 1891.

== Later legal work ==
In 1892, Robinson took on his most famous client, Lizzie Borden. Borden stood accused of the murder of her father and stepmother, and had been compelled to give testimony in the coroner's inquest into their deaths. Robinson's addition to her defense team may have been due to the fact that he had, while governor, appointed the presiding judge to the bench. He was able to get Borden's inconsistent inquest testimony excluded from the criminal trial (on the grounds that she had not been represented in those hearings), and was also able to cast significant doubt on the reliability of several witnesses to the events surrounding the murders. Borden was ultimately acquitted of the criminal charges, and Robinson was a highly visible presence in the media circus that attended the trial.

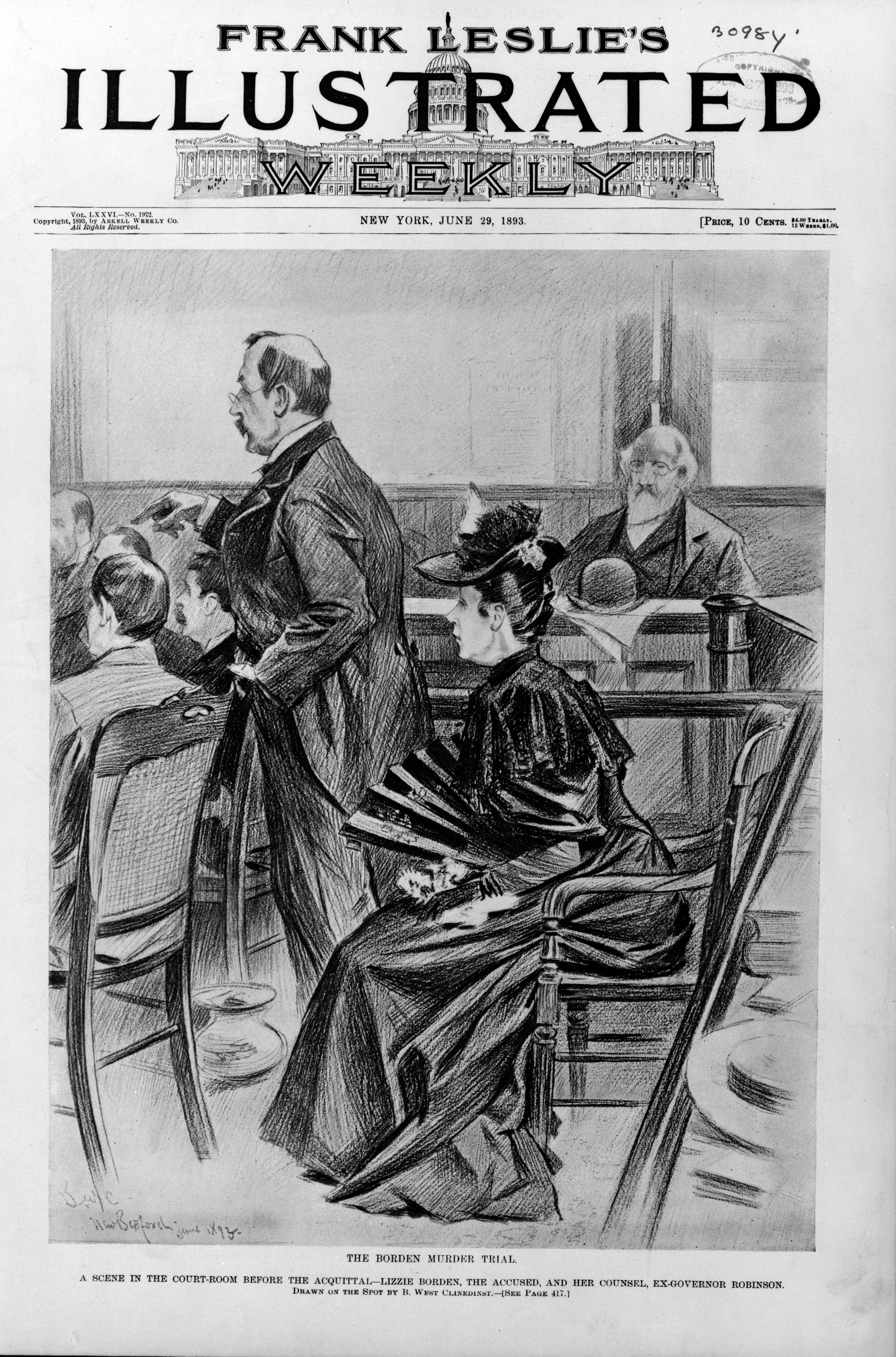
Contemporary magazine drawing of the Borden trial; Robinson stands facing left, with Lizzie Borden seated

Another well-known client that Robinson took on was the Order of the Iron Hall, nominally a fraternal benefit society founded in Indiana in 1881. The organization was essentially a fraudulent investment vehicle that was a combination of a tontine (where increased benefits accrue to survivors as investors die) and a Ponzi scheme (where deposits of later investors are used to pay off earlier ones). Tontines were illegal under Massachusetts insurance regulations, and the Iron Hall was threatened in 1887 with an injunction to stop doing business in the state. It hired Robinson to appear before the legislature, and he was able to secure legislative alteration to the statute governing fraternal societies that would permit continued operation. Iron Hall went into receivership in 1892, and the state insurance commissioner criticized Robinson for his defense of the organization in his reports, which he charged exacerbated the financial losses incurred by Iron Hall and similar organizations. (The Iron Hall was one of the more high-profile of a large number of similar investment schemes, in which the operators of the organization also frequently siphoned funds away in the guise of salaries and expenses.)

Robinson remained a prominent lawyer until his death in Chicopee; he is buried in Chicopee's Fairview Cemetery. His law firm remains in business, and is now known as Robinson Donovan P.C.

== Family ==
Robinson was married twice. The first marriage was in 1859 to Hannah Stevens, with whom he had one child before her death in 1864. He then married Susan Simonds in 1867, with whom he also had one child. Robinson was active in the Unitarian Church.

== See also ==
- 1874 Massachusetts legislature
- 1876 Massachusetts legislature

== Sources ==
- "The Nation". June 23, 1887.
- Bennett, Frank (November 1892). "The "Endowment" Craze in Massachusetts". The American Journal of Politics: 514–527. ISSN 2155-2363. OCLC 7720001.
- Cumbler, John (2001). Reasonable Use: The People, the Environment, and the State, New England 1790-1930. New York: Oxford University Press. ISBN 9780195350166. OCLC 191818016.
- Dunn, Jacob Piatt (1910). Greater Indianapolis; the history, the industries, the institutions, and the people of a city of homes. Chicago: Lewis Publishing Co. OCLC 1870748.
- Gleason, Daniel (1906). Memorial of the Harvard College Class of 1856. Boston: George Ellis. OCLC 45294512.
- Massachusetts Insurance Department (1888). Annual Report of the Insurance Commissioner. Boston: Wright & Potter. OCLC 12494720.
- Massachusetts Insurance Department (1892). Annual Report of the Insurance Commissioner. Boston: Wright & Potter. OCLC 12494720.
- Miller, Edward H (July 2009). "They Vote Only for the Spoils: Massachusetts Reformers, Suffrage Restriction, and the 1884 Civil Service Law". The Journal of the Gilded Age and Progressive Era. 8 (3): 341–363. doi:10.1017/S1537781400001304. JSTOR 40542837. S2CID 154955020.
- Rundell, Laura (1999). "Robinson, George Dexter". Dictionary of American National Biography. Vol. 18. New York: Oxford University Press. pp. 654–655. ISBN 9780195206357. OCLC 39182280.
- United States Congress. "George D. Robinson (id: R000335)". Biographical Directory of the United States Congress.

Party political offices
Preceded by Robert R. Bishop	Republican nominee for Governor of Massachusetts; 1883, 1884, 1885	Succeeded by Oliver Ames
U.S. House of Representatives
Preceded by Chester W. Chapin	Member of the U.S. House of Representatives from Massachusetts's 11th congressional district 1877–1883	Succeeded by William Whiting II
Preceded by district reissued	Member of the U.S. House of Representatives from Massachusetts's 12th congressional district 1883 – January 7, 1884	Succeeded by Francis W. Rockwell
Political offices
Preceded by Benjamin F. Butler	Governor of Massachusetts; 1884–1887	Succeeded by Oliver Ames
