= Herbert C. Joyner =

American lawyer and politician (1838–1927)

Member of the Massachusetts Senate for the South Berkshire district
- In office 1884–1886
- Preceded by: John M. Seeley
- Succeeded by: District eliminated

Personal details
- Born: July 12, 1838 New Hartford, New York, U.S.
- Died: January 5, 1927 (aged 88) Brookline, Massachusetts, U.S.
- Party: Republican (until 1884); Democratic (1884–1927)
- Education: Charlotteville Seminary; Troy Conference Academy

Herbert Curtis Joyner (July 12, 1838 – January 5, 1927) was an American lawyer and politician who was a member of the Massachusetts Senate from 1884 to 1886 and the Democratic Party nominee for Lieutenant Governor of Massachusetts in 1902.

== Early life ==
Joyner was born on July 12, 1838, in New Hartford, New York, to Newton and Mary A. (Curtis) Joyner. His great-grandfather, Octavius Joyner, and grandfather, Philo Joyner, represented Egremont, Massachusetts in the Massachusetts General Court.

Joyner was educated in the New Hartford public schools, Charlotteville Seminary, and Troy Conference Academy. After completing school, Joyner worked as a teacher in New Jersey for two years.

== Legal career ==
In 1860, Joyner moved to Great Barrington, Massachusetts and studied law in the office of Thomas Twinning. During the American Civil War, he served in the 49th Massachusetts Infantry Regiment for a year. He was admitted to the bar in 1865 and opened a law office in Great Barrington.

Joyner was the defense attorney in most of the capital cases in Berkshire County. In 1878, he defended John Ten Eyck, a black farm laborer who was convicted of killing an elderly couple in Sheffield, Massachusetts. In 1893, he defended William Coy, who was accused of killing a co-worker he believed had an affair with his wife. Coy was found guilty and hanged. In 1901, he defended Robert S. Fosberg, who charged with manslaughter in the death of his sister. Following a high-profile trial, Fosberg was acquitted in a directed verdict. That same year, he was a court appointed attorney for Daniel Leary, an inmate of the Pittsfield House of Correction who was accused of killing a corrections officer. Leary was found "not guilty by reason of insanity" and committed to the Hospital for Insane Criminals. In 1907, he was appointed by the court to defend William M. Berry, who was charged with the murder of his wife, Rose. Berry was found insane and committed to the Hospital for Insane Criminals.

== Politics ==
From 1866 to 1878, Joyner was a member of the Great Barrington school board. During his tenure, the school district divided levels of study into grades and constructed its first high school.

Joyner was a member of the Massachusetts House of Representatives in 1869 and 1883. In the 1884 United States presidential election, he broke with the Republican Party and backed Democratic candidate Grover Cleveland. From 1884 to 1886, he was a member of the Massachusetts Senate.

In 1886, he was the Democratic nominee for the United States House of Representatives seat in Massachusetts's 12th congressional district. He lost to Republican incumbent Francis W. Rockwell 50% to 46%. It was the closest a Democrat had come to winning that seat to that point.

In 1902, Joyner became the Democratic nominee for Lieutenant Governor after John Crawford Crosby withdrew from the race. He lost to Republican Curtis Guild Jr. 191,997 votes to 137,614.

== Personal life and death ==
On January 5, 1855, Joyner married Mary E. Wilde in Norton, Massachusetts. They had five children and resided in Great Barrington.

Joyner was a charter member of the Great Barrington Grand Army of the Republic post and was its commander from 1870 to 1875. He joined the Society of the Cincinnati Lodge of Great Barrington in 1869 and served as its secretary for six years. He was also a Freemason.

Joynder died on January 5, 1927, in Brookline, Massachusetts.

Party political offices
Preceded by John W. Coughlin	Democratic nominee for Lieutenant Governor of Massachusetts; 1902	Succeeded by Richard Olney II
