= Julius Caesar Chappelle =

American politician (c. 1852 – 1904)

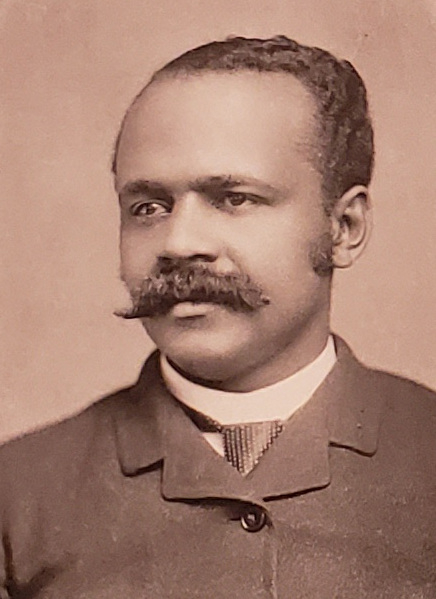

Member of the Massachusetts House of Representatives from the 9th Suffolk district
- In office 1883–1886 Serving with George L. Clark (1882–84); Augustine H. Read (1885); Henry Parkman (1886)
- Preceded by: John F. Andrew; Henry W. Swift
- Succeeded by: William Oscar Armstrong

Personal details
- Born: c. 1852 Newberry County, South Carolina
- Died: January 27, 1904 (aged 51-52) Roxbury, Boston, Massachusetts
- Party: Republican
- Spouse: Elizabeth
- Relations: Pat Chappelle (nephew)

Julius Caesar Chappelle (c. 1852 – January 27, 1904) was an American Republican Party politician who was born into slavery in South Carolina and served in the Massachusetts General Court. He was a leading figure of Boston's black community from 1870 until his death.

He was the first African-American to serve on the Massachusetts Republican State Committee and an active supporter of civil rights and consumer protection. His speeches were frequently covered by newspapers.

== Early life and education ==
Julius Caesar Chappelle was born into slavery to an enslaved mother in 1852 at Chappelle's Landing, a plantation in Newberry County, South Carolina. He was classified as a "mulatto," of mixed race, with African-European ancestry.

There is evidence that during very early childhood Julius Chappelle and at least one of his brothers may have been moved from South Carolina to two other plantations in different states before being brought back to Newberry County. During slavery, it was often common for plantation owners to break up families and move them to different plantations of the same owner in order to stop possible uprisings.

Chapelle was 13 years old when slavery was abolished following the end of the American Civil War. He studied at an academy for black students in nearby Edgefield.

During Chappelle's childhood, South Carolina was an area of white resistance to Reconstruction and the rights of former slaves. Insurgent groups were active in trying to maintain white supremacy. The Ku Klux Klan had numerous chapters that attacked freedmen to maintain white supremacy and establish dominance. Due to the severity of the insurgents' attacks, in 1871 President Ulysses Grant ordered the National Guard of the United States into nine counties in South Carolina, declaring martial law in order to suppress the Ku Klux Klan. The KKK usually raided towns, as many towns in South Carolina such as the Town of Newberry were abolitionist, whereas the slave plantation areas were not.

=== LaVilla, Florida ===
Around 1869, Chappelle moved to Florida to help establish the black community of LaVilla, today a neighborhood of Jacksonville.

=== Boston ===
In November 1870, the young Julius Chappelle moved to Boston. The city was then known for its thriving black community and attracted many migrants from Southern states in the 19th century.

In Boston, he continued his studies and graduated from high school. He found work as a custodial engineer for the Boston Herald newspaper, staying with them for 13 years. He later worked as building superintendent at a United States Post Office and at the United States Boston Custom House.

== Political and civil rights career ==
=== Early involvement ===
Lewis Hayden helped bring Chappelle into the Republican Party and started him out giving him the task to register people to vote. Chappelle was quite successful at it, and was known for his neat appearance as he also learned the barber's trade when in Chelsea, Massachusetts.

Newspapers described Chappelle as having a brisk walk and as being well spoken. Boston's Sunday Herald in 1886 that Chappelle was thought of as an "Adonis" by the African-American community.

=== Massachusetts General Court ===
In the early 1880s, he was nominated as a Republican candidate for the state legislature from Boston's Ninth Ward, including the Beacon Hill area, and was elected for four terms from 1883 to 1886. He became one of the early prominent African-American legislators.

The Ninth Ward was also called the Ninth Suffolk district and was composed of 2,800 voters in 1886. The Boston Globe described the Ward as extremely diverse both ethnically and economically: "There is not another ward in the whole town that so completely embraces all the grades of society. On the voting lists of one precinct are few voting names that do not bear the Celtic stamp, while another precinct is composed entirely of colored men. Then there is the precinct where the voters are mostly of the middle walk, where still in another the most pretentious people of Boston are still in control."

Upon his election, Republican legislators tried to prevent Chappelle from having an actual chair in the General Court by pinning the name of a white Republican on his chair, forcing Chappelle to find another "out-of the way" chair to sit in. Though this incident was not without precedent, it was considered a mark of hypocrisy by the otherwise pro-black Republican Party. The next day, the Republican caucus issued a statement denouncing the story and claiming it was the prerogative of Chappelle's defeated opponent to bequeath his chair to whom he chose. In the House, Chappelle served on committees for the "Federal relations and engrossed bill," and "Public Land and State House."

In 1883, Chappelle introduced a bill to stop exploitative chain gangs in the South.

Chappelle staunchly supported expanding the federal Civil Rights Act of 1866 to prohibit race discrimination in public settings, stating "It is on the principle of rights that belong to us that we want this bill passed and public places thrown open." He promoted African-American civil rights, and worked on consumer affairs issues.

==== Elections ====
===== 1882 =====
When Chappelle was nominated to the Massachusetts General Court, he was opposed by other African-American candidates. An elected African-American secretary in his own party said that he had been elected by fraud. The charges against Chappelle were proven untrue with a recount of two times. The New York Globe wrote, "Chappelle will, in the opinion of many white and colored voters, be elected in spite of such mean tricks."

In 1882, Chappelle succeeded John F. Andrew (son of Governor John Albion Andrew) and defeated Democrat Brooks Adams (great-grandson of President John Adams).

===== 1884 recount =====
In 1884, Chappelle narrowly defeated Democrat Charles Albert Prince, son of Boston Mayor Frederick O. Prince, in a highly contested election.

The original count was 831 votes for Julius C. Chappelle and 800 for Prince. However, a recount was "done in a "hurried manner by the Board of Alderman" without Chappelle's knowledge or presence, and it showed 730 votes for Chappelle and 815 votes for Prince.

Upon hearing the recount tally, Chappelle declared the recount illegal and petitioned the House of Representatives stating that the Board refused to recount 51 votes for Chappelle that were "effaced" by stickers in the area where "for Representative" was located, and that the original vote tally should remain. Prince later conceded the election to Chappelle. Prince stated that the stickers affected both candidates, and Prince no longer wanted the seat as it seemed that the sticker issue caused Prince the dismay of not wanting to partake in politics mentioning in his resignation letter that ". . .the stickers for one of the candidates for senator were either so broad or so carelessly pasted upon the ballot that it covered the title of the vote for representative printed beneath thereon. Both Mr. Chappelle and myself were sufferers by reason thereof . . . "

===== 1885 =====
In 1885, the Daily Globe reported "Julius C. Chappelle, who enjoys immensely that distinction of being the first colored man to sit for so long a period on Beacon Hill" where the staunch Republican Chappelle was mentioned within a column devoted mainly to Democrats. Chappelle's new running mate Henry Parkman did not strongly support his re-election, but Chappelle was re-elected regardless, defeating Robert Hooper, the son of Congressman Samuel Hooper.

==== Retirement from General Court ====
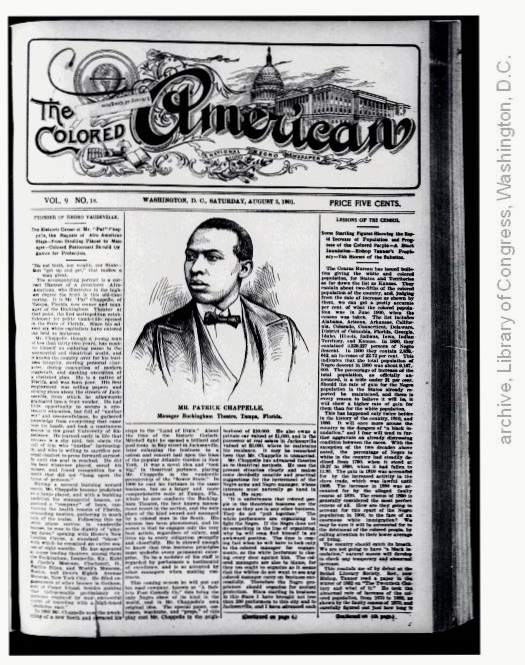
Conservative entertainment in the 1880s and early 1900s, Julius Caesar Chappelle's nephew Pat H. Chappelle was a musical prodigy that dominated the Eastern seaboard with the popular African-American traveling vaudeville show, The Rabbit's Foot Comedy Company, and was also in the theater and saloon business.

In 1886, Chappelle was opposed for renomination by African-American City Councilman William O. Armstrong. Though Chappelle was strongly urged to run for a fifth term, he retired.

=== Republican State Committee ===
Chappelle served three one-year terms on the state committee of the Massachusetts Republican Party, representing Boston's Fifth Ward from 1889. In his third term the president of the state committee in Boston, Massachusetts and was the first African-American in this position. He was active in the Massachusetts State House politics of that time.

Chappelle also served as an alternate delegate to the 1884 Republican National Convention in Chicago.

== Post-legislative career ==
In 1886, Chappelle was appointed as an Inspector at Elections.

In early August 1890, Chappelle spoke about the right of blacks to vote in every United States state, to an "enthusiastic" meeting in Boston's Faneuil Hall to support the Federal Elections Bill:

"I regret the occasion of such a meeting as this for the reason that the principles of this bill were placed upon the Republican platform when we nominated our present President, and who, in this message to Congress, recommended the principles of such a measure. We hear through the Independent and Democratic press that there is a sufficient number of weak-kneed Republicans to defeat the passage of this bill and am pleased to find so many of our leading business men willing to support it. These same independent papers seem to be in direct opposition to anything that will tend to give the Negro a fair chance. In the days of slavery, they were opposed to freedom and are now opposed to our obtaining our rights. This bill should have passed 25 years ago. We would not have been subjected to the treatment received now. The North and South have always had trouble and will continue to do so until every man has his rights. The vote of the Negro must be counted with as much honesty in South Carolina as any white man's in Massachusetts."

=== Criticisms of Republican Party ===
After serving in political office, Chappelle tried to obtain an appointed position in Washington, D.C., but he was not considered or mentioned for a position. Massachusetts Senators Henry L. Dawes and George Frisbie Hoar were criticized for not doing more to gain political appointments for the several African-American office holders in Massachusetts. It was said that the white Republican Senators did not mention any African-Americans politicians to President Benjamin Harrison, even though they all campaigned for Harrison in 1888.

In 1892, Chappelle expressed concern that the new white Republican Party of Massachusetts as not being as generous as the older white abolitionist Republican Party. At his retirement party from the Republican State committee, he commented then that the new white Republicans would under-employ African-Americans as janitors instead of building superintendents or other better positions, and that African-American youth would feel stuck in a rut. Chappelle also argued that diminished business stature would lead to diminished political stature, as political strength was at least partly dependent on the patronage system of the time.

At the Fraternal Association's 22nd annual banquet held that year at the Quincy House, Chappelle mentioned, "I have seen that Massachusetts is no longer a safe State for Republicans," and mentioned that men of color in public office were not receiving positions as even messengers at the State House.

=== Opposition to Prohibition ===
During the 1890s, some African American activists in Boston supported enacting policies against the commercial sale of alcohol, and the Prohibition Party tried to win over those voters in Massachusetts. Chappelle's friend, African-American Boston City Councillor William Oscar Armstrong, was their chief organizer. Armstrong was later the first black man ever nominated for Massachusetts state office, when he ran for Auditor on the Prohibition ticket in 1891.

Armstrong's efforts to recruit African-American voters were opposed by Chappelle. In 1891, the Boston Daily Globe reported that, "It is understood by colored men that the campaign for colored men is left entirely in the hands of Mr. Chappelle and he is after the Armstrong men. Everywhere the Armstrong people hold meetings there, a night or so after, are the Chappelle men." The article also reads that the Armstrong men denied being associated with the Democratic Party.

In 1895, Chappelle was appointed to a committee of the Douglass Club to lobby for liquor licenses to be granted to African-American business owners.

== Personal life ==
Chappelle married Elizabeth "Eugenia" Chappelle, and they had a daughter named Lillian.

Julius's brothers Lewis and Mitchell were both prominent members of LaVilla society. Mitchell served as Mayor of LaVilla from 1874 to 1876 and a Duval County Justice of the Peace. Lewis was a prominent construction contractor and served as a LaVilla councilman from 1875 to 1877.

Julius's nephew Pat Chappelle (son of Lewis) owned The Rabbit's Foot Company, a leading vaudeville show, and was known as the "black P.T. Barnum." Julius introduced his nephew Pat to entertainment promoters in Boston. Along with his brothers Lewis II and James, Pat ran the Buckingham Theatre and Saloon in Tampa, Florida.

In mid-January 1898, Chappelle was falsely accused by an African-American porter of buying stolen shoes and was acquitted after approximately a month.

=== Social life ===
Chappelle, often accompanied by his wife Eugenia, was a staple at many social gatherings during and after his time in office.

Julius C. Chappelle and his wife attended the popular "6th Annual Ball of Headwaiters of Young's Hotel " at Horticultural Hall in 1883.

In 1886, the prestigious Massachusetts Club inducted Chappelle and Frederick Douglass (though Douglass was only an honorary member). According to a Cleveland Gazette 1886 report, Chappelle was also the only African-American full member of the club. Both accepted their membership at a gathering at Boston's Young's Hotel attended by prominent Massachusetts politicians.

In 1889, Chappelle presided over a meeting at the Charles Street African Methodist Episcopal Church concerning the education of southern African-Americans.

In 1889, Chappelle was an organizer of the St. John's Day Picnic. Among the speakers was Chappelle's political mentor Lewis Hayden.

In January 1901 Chappelle spoke at a memorial held for Roger Wolcott and African-American lawyer Edward G. Walker at the Kirk Literary Club in January 1901, referring to the ex-Governor as "the most democratic of aristocratic Boston."

== Death ==
Julius C. Chappelle died in 1904 in Boston after a long illness, survived by his wife Elizabeth and daughter Lillian. His funeral was said to be "one of the largest" seen in Boston in years.

His Boston Daily Globe obituary said that "Julius Caesar Chappelle was a unique political character in the Republican party of the state. Outside of Lewis Hayden, John J. Smith, and Edward G. Walker, he was one of the best-known colored men in Massachusetts."
