= 1880 Massachusetts legislature =

101st Massachusetts General Court
←	100th	102nd	→

Overview
- Legislative body: General Court
- Election: November 4, 1879

Senate
- Members: 40
- President: Robert R. Bishop
- Party control: Republican

House
- Members: 240
- Speaker: Charles J. Noyes
- Party control: Republican

Sessions
- 1st: January 7, 1880 – April 24, 1880

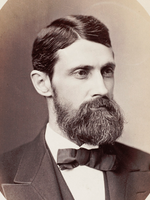
Robert Bishop, Senate president.

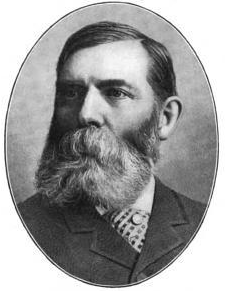
Charles Noyes, House speaker.

Leaders of the Massachusetts General Court, 1880.

The 101st Massachusetts General Court, consisting of the Massachusetts Senate and the Massachusetts House of Representatives, met in 1880 during the governorship of John Davis Long. Robert R. Bishop served as president of the Senate and Charles J. Noyes served as speaker of the House.

== Senators ==
Image	Name	Date of birth	District	Party
	William Abbott	1834	2nd Worcester	
	Samuel N. Aldrich	February 3, 1839	4th Middlesex	
	Oliver Ames	February 4, 1831	1st Bristol	
	Stephen Francis Blaney	1844	2nd Essex	
	Charles J. Brooks	July 6, 1844	8th Suffolk	
	Elisha S. Converse	July 28, 1820	1st Middlesex	
	Charles T. Crocker	March 2, 1833	5th Worcester	
	George Glover Crocker	December 15, 1843	4th Suffolk	
	Warren Currier	July 20, 1830	4th Essex	
	James William Dwyer	1845	North Berkshire	
	Anson D. Fessenden	February 18, 1839	5th Middlesex	
	Ebenezer T. Fogg	October 30, 1826	1st Plymouth	
	Jonas Harrod French	November 4, 1829	3rd Essex	
	Henry William Fuller	June 30, 1839	7th Suffolk	
	Emerson Gaylord	September 2, 1817	2nd Hampden	
	Harmon Hall	July 18, 1818	1st Essex	
	Alpheus Harding	January 12, 1818	4th Worcester	
	Eben Hutchinson	1841	1st Suffolk	
	Marcus Perrin Knowlton	February 3, 1839	1st Hampden	
	Charles S. Lilley	December 13, 1851	7th Middlesex	
	Asa Porter Morse	1818	3rd Middlesex	
	Stephen Osgood	November 16, 1826	5th Essex	
	John Lord Otis	1827	Hampshire	
	James Paine Ray	1820	2nd Norfolk	
	Henry C. Rice	August 22, 1827	1st Worcester	
	George B. Richmond	November 9, 1821	3rd Bristol	
	Joseph Hubbard Root	1823	Franklin	
	Daniel Russell	July 16, 1824	6th Middlesex	
	Elizur Smith	January 5, 1812	South Berkshire	
	Samuel Snow	1828	Cape	
	James W. Stockwell	December 6, 1837	3rd Worcester	
	Andrew C. Stone	May 16, 1839	6th Essex	
	William Taylor	1831	3rd Suffolk	
	Nathaniel Wales	November 25, 1819	1st Norfolk	
	Alonzo Warren	1827	5th Suffolk	
	Thomas Webb	October 24, 1819	2nd Bristol	
	Starkes Whiton	April 11, 1829	2nd Plymouth	
	Calvin M. Winch	November 26, 1832	6th Suffolk	

== Representatives ==
image	Name	Date of birth	District	Party
	John Ware Adams	1836		
	Charles Hastings Allen	1828		
	John Forrester Andrew	1850		
	Newell Sylvanus Atwood	1834		
	George Norval Bacon	1835		
	George Warren Bail	1832		
	Stephen Powers Bailey	1818		
	John Israel Baker	1812		
	Samuel Dwight Bardwell	1819		
	Samuel Augustus Bartholomew	1824		
	Philander Bates	1842		
	Ebenezer Beckford	1833		
	Lucius Beebe	1810		
	James William Bennett	1833		
	George Albert Berry	1837		
	John Frank Berry	1840		
	Abraham Orlando Bigelow	1812		
	Francis Bigelow	1840		
	John Winthrop Bigelow	1832		
	Lewis Bigelow	1808		
	William Blanchard	1821		
	George Henry Bond	1840		
	Samuel Wells Bowerman	1830		
	Benjamin Franklin Boyden	1846		
	John Quincy Adams Brackett	June 8, 1842		
	Martin Luther Bradford	1821		
	Henry Harding Brigham	1814		
	George Bruce Brown	1830		
	William Austin Brown	1820		
	William Blanchard Brown	1821		
	William Wilson Brown	1848		
	James McKellar Bugbee	1837		
	Sidney Augustus Bull	1847		
	John Coburn Burley	1837		
	George Lathe Burt	1829		
	Joseph Burt	1821		
	John Haskell Butler	1841		
	Dexter Butterfield	March 15, 1842		
	Hobart M. Cable			
	Peter Cannon	1825		
	Nathan Dexter Canterbury	1837		
	William Henry Carberry	February 22, 1851		
	James Albert Carruth	1839		
	Lewis L. Carter	1822		
	Joseph Henry Churchill	1820		
	Frank Allen Clapp	1849		
	John Milton Cochran	1849		
	Amos Coffin			
	Lewis Coleman	1817		
	Elias Pike Collins	1829		
	Louis Atwood Cook	1847		
	John Cornell	1830		
	Isaac Newton Crosby	1824		
	Jeremiah John Crowley	1850		
	Eli Culley	1840		
	Edwin James Cushing	1842		
	Henry Putney Danforth	1845		
	Keyes Danforth	1822		
	James Franklin Davenport	1832		
	Person Davis	1819		
	Joshua Dean	1830		
	John Henry Dee	May 13, 1842		
	John Delaney	1815		
	John Francis Dever	1858		
	Clinton Henry Dodge	1835		
	James Joseph Doherty	1848		
	Daniel Francis Dolan	1847		
	Elbridge Curtis Donnell	1839		
	James Thompson Drew	1813		
	George Wells Eddy	1837		
	George Dyer Eldridge	1848		
	James Madison Evans	1837		
	Walter Hamlet Faunce	1832		
	Charles Henry Ferson	1819		
	George Batchelder Fiske	1834		
	Stephen Flanders	1835		
	George Louis Flint	1852		
	William Abraham Foss	1838		
	Jesse Harding Freeman	1826		
	Edwin Gage	1830		
	William Howard Gale	1831		
	John Henry Galligan	1851		
	Francis Gardner	1828		
	Charles Frederick Gerry	1823		
	James Ellis Gifford	1832		
	Rufus Babcock Gifford	1827		
	George Dodge Glover	1823		
	Robert Goulding	1825		
	Bryan Harding	1842		
	Calvin Lyon Hartshorn	1832		
	Thomas Jones Hastings	January 24, 1835		
	Thomas Bly Hathaway	December 5, 1825		
	Edward Daniel Hayden	1833		
	Thomas Wentworth Higginson	December 22, 1823		
	Hamilton Andrews Hill	1827		
	Henry Hobbs	1827		
	Joseph Field Holbrook	1841		
	Horace Marshall Holmes	1830		
	Edwin Jackson Horton	1837		
	Nathaniel Augustus Horton	1830		
	Russell Spaulding Horton	1825		
	Charles Henry Howland	1826		
	Andrew Jackson Huntress	1826		
	Daniel Bowman Ingalls	1829		
	William Hutchins Ingraham	1817		
	Martin Van Buren Jefferson	1833		
	James Leonard Jenney	1833		
	George William Johnson	1827		
	Joseph Prosper Johnson	1813		
	Edward Dorr Griffin Jones	1824		
	Thomas Brooks Jones	1839		
	Benjamin Adams Jourdan	July 20, 1832		
	John Joyce	1837		
	Albert Keith	1823		
	Simon Kelley	1846		
	Lorrin Porter Keyes	1838		
	James Langford	1847		
	Daniel Warren Lawrence	1830		
	James Madison Lawton	1813		
	Marcus Leonard	1846		
	Arthur Lincoln	1842		
	Clark Lincoln	1821		
	George Brigham Livermore	1836		
	Henry Cabot Lodge	1850		
	Dwight B. Look	1820		
	Daniel Bolles Lord	1821		
	Marcus Morton Loud	1839		
	Pardon Macomber	February 9, 1833		
	James Pollock Magee			
	Patrick Francis Mahoney	1847		
	James Thomas Mahony	1843		
	Thomas Main	1807		
	George Sampson Marshall	1833		
	Hugh Maxwell	1836		
	James William McDonald	May 15, 1857		
	Patrick Francis McGaragle	1845		
	James Aloysius McGeough	1853		
	Patrick Michael McGlynn	1853		
	John McSorley	1832		
	Andrew Nelson Medbery	1827		
	Christopher Columbus Merritt	September 29, 1830		
	Edwin Dickinson Metcalf	March 14, 1848		
	Eben Colbraith Milliken	1843		
	Alfred Cushing Monroe	1841		
	Eugene Michael Moriarty	April 15, 1849		
	Daniel Tilton Morrison	1820		
	Robert McNeil Morse	1837		
	John Dennis Mulchinock	1855		
	Jeremiah Henry Mullane	August 15, 1852		
	Norman Carmi Munson	1820		
	J. Allston Newhall	1847		
	Leander Warren Newton	1838		
	Joseph John Nichols	1850		
	Erastus Nickerson	1821		
	Charles Johnson Noyes	August 7, 1841		
	Increase Eldredge Noyes	1834		
	James H. Nugent	1831		
	John O'Donnell	1853		
	Joseph Henry O'Neil	March 23, 1853		
	Henry Paddack	April 2, 1838		
	George Winter Park	1834		
	Charles Oscar Parmenter	1833		
	John Wesley Peabody	1837		
	Edward Pease	1838		
	Walter Barber Peck	1838		
	William Gaylord Peck	1841		
	Henry Moses Phillips	1845		
	John James Pickman	January 9, 1850		
	Francis Plunkett	1840		
	Edward Payson Poor	1829		
	Edwin Bartlett Pratt	1832		
	Lyman Knight Putney	1833		
	James Lawrence Quigley	1848		
	John Dennis Reed	1827		
	George Willard Rice	1836		
	Joseph Marcus Rice	1827		
	Stephen Rich	1834		
	Richard Roach	1833		
	Charles Robinson	1829		
	Horace Tyler Rockwell	1838		
	Thomas Pitkin Root	1824		
	Isaac Rosnosky	November 6, 1846		
	George Thomas Sampson	1819		
	William Sanders	1843		
	William Henry Sargent	1836		
	Augustus Elwin Scott	1838		
	Charles Edwin Seagrave	1825		
	Dwight Loomis Shaw	1822		
	James Shead	1818		
	Seth Carroll Shepard	1815		
	John Henry Sherburne	1845		
	Jonathan Edward Shipman	1832		
	Henry Almy Slocum	1825		
	William Smeath	1834		
	Charles Whipple Smith	1846		
	Hinsdale Smith	1819		
	Zenas Elmer Smith	1821		
	Arthur John Clark Sowdon	1835		
	James Harvey Sparrow	1825		
	Robert Lyman Spear	1839		
	George Morrison Starbird	1833		
	Eben Francis Stone	August 3, 1822		
	Augustus Whittemore Stover	1834		
	Charles Francis Swift	1825		
	Joseph Russell Taber	1821		
	Robert Tarr	1832		
	Levi Taylor	1824		
	Michael John Teahan	1840		
	John Randolph Thayer	1845		
	Samuel Proctor Thayer	1853		
	Silas Foster Thayer	1822		
	Edward Isaiah Thomas	1833		
	William Tinker	1823		
	William Ripley Tompkins	1826		
	William Eaton Topliff	1826		
	William Henry Tozer	1835		
	Edward Trask	1843		
	Arthur Webster Tufts	1828		
	Joseph Augustine Tufts	1835		
	Samuel Burns Valpey	1829		
	Merritt Van Deusen	1820		
	Leavitt R.J. Varnum	1847		
	Chester Kingsley Waite	1825		
	Jonathan Wales	1849		
	Joseph Henry Walker	1829		
	William James Wallace	1833		
	Horace Everett Ware	1845		
	John Flavel Warner			
	Lewis Henry Warner	1845		
	Nathan Warren	1838		
	William Cullen Warren	1822		
	Alonzo Carter Webber	1827		
	Edwin R. Webster	1831		
	John Gerrish Webster	1811		
	Henry Jackson Wells	1823		
	Charles Augustus Wentworth	1830		
	Howard Alphonso Wheeler	1848		
	Joseph Dudley Wilde	1829		
	Hiram Williams	1824		
	Henry Franklin Wing	1825		

== See also ==
- 1880 Massachusetts gubernatorial election
- 46th United States Congress
- List of Massachusetts General Courts
