= 1882 Massachusetts legislature =

103rd meeting of the Massachusetts General Court

103rd Massachusetts General Court
←	102nd	104th	→

Overview
- Legislative body: General Court
- Election: November 8, 1881

Senate
- Members: 40
- President: Robert R. Bishop
- Party control: Republican

House
- Members: 240
- Speaker: Charles J. Noyes
- Party control: Republican

Sessions
- 1st: January 4, 1882 – May 27, 1882

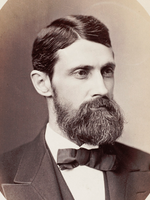
Robert Bishop, Senate president.

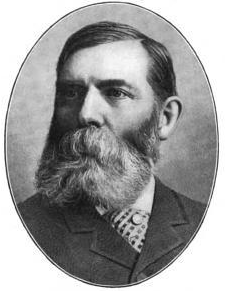
Charles Noyes, House speaker.

Leaders of the Massachusetts General Court, 1882.

The 103rd Massachusetts General Court, consisting of the Massachusetts Senate and the Massachusetts House of Representatives, met in 1882 during the governorship of John Davis Long. Robert R. Bishop served as president of the Senate and Charles J. Noyes served as speaker of the House of Representatives.

== Senators ==
- Charles H. Allen
- James S. Allen
- John R. Baldwin
- William Barker Jr.
- Joseph Bennett
- Robert R. Bishop
- George A. Bruce
- Samuel Cook
- Chester C. Corbin
- Charles A. Corser
- George G. Crocker
- Jeremiah Crowley
- Charles T. Gallagher
- Owen A. Galvin
- Charles F. Gerry
- James S. Grinnell
- William H. Haile
- Leander M. Hannum
- Thomas J. Hastings
- Nathaniel A. Horton
- Daniel B. Ingalls
- Andrew J. Jennings
- George W. Johnson
- Joseph P. Johnson
- Warren E. Locke
- Peleg McFarlin
- John M. Moore
- Augustus Mudge
- Francis Norwood
- William Reed Jr.
- Francis W. Rockwell
- Joseph N. Rolfe
- John M. Seeley
- John H. Sherburne
- James Smith
- Andrew C. Stone
- Charles Q. Tirrell
- David W. Tucker
- Arthur W. Tufts
- Thomas Winship

== See also ==
- 1882 Massachusetts gubernatorial election
- 47th United States Congress
- List of Massachusetts General Courts
