= 1879 Massachusetts legislature =

100th Massachusetts General Court
| ← | 99th | 101st | → |

Overview
- Legislative body: General Court
- Election: November 5, 1878

Senate
- Members: 40
- President: John B. D. Cogswell
- Party control: Republican

House
- Members: 240
- Speaker: Levi C. Wade
- Party control: Republican

Sessions
- 1st: January 1, 1879 – April 30, 1879

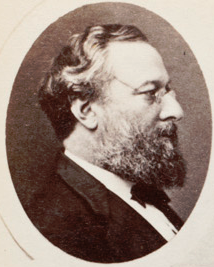
John Cogswell, Senate president.

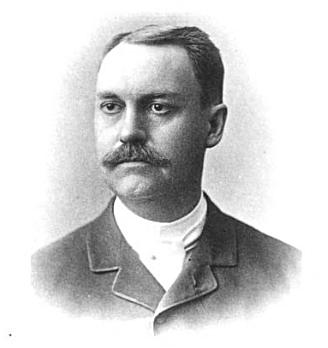
Levi Wade, House speaker.

Leaders of the Massachusetts General Court, 1879.

The 100th Massachusetts General Court, consisting of the Massachusetts Senate and the Massachusetts House of Representatives, met in 1879 during the governorship of Thomas Talbot. John B. D. Cogswell served as president of the Senate and Levi C. Wade served as speaker of the House.

Members earned a salary of $500 per year.

Notable legislation included the "Act to Give Women the Right to Vote for Members of School Committees."

== Senators ==
- Samuel N. Aldrich
- E. Dana Bancroft
- Joseph S. Beal
- Robert R. Bishop
- Stephen M. Blaney
- Alvah A. Burrage
- George W. Cate
- John B. D. Cogswell
- Ezra Davol
- Dallas J. Dean
- Justin Dewey
- Frederick D. Ely
- Jacob Emerson
- Jonas H. French
- Charles L. Gardner
- Alpheus Harding
- Nathan M. Hawkes
- Benjamin F. Hayes
- Eben Hutchinson
- Francis Jewett
- H. M. Knowlton
- William Knowlton
- John B. Martin
- Charles H. Merriara
- Asa P. Morse
- Eugene L. Norton
- Weaver Osborn
- Stephen Osgood
- John L. Otis
- Albert Palmer
- Henry C. Rice
- Joseph S. Ropes
- Daniel Russell
- James W. Stockwell
- William Taylor
- Nathaniel Wales
- James White
- Jonathan White
- Henry Winn
- A. C. Woodworth

== Representatives ==
- George William Lowther
- George T. Samspon.
- Richard Beeching.
- William J. Burke.
- William A Foss.
- John B. Norton.
- Jeremiah J. Crowley.
- Joseph W. Davis.
- John H. Dee.
- John H. Sherburne.
- James L. Quigley.
- Cornelius Desmond.
- Neil Henry.
- Richard Roach.
- Dennis O'Connor.
- James L. Locke.
- Edward F. Thayer.
- George W. Lowther.
- Thomas Russell.
- A. J. C. Sowdon.
- Charles J. Prescott.
- Hamilton F. Hill.
- Patrick F. Murphy.
- James A. McGeough.
- T. F. FitzGerald.
- Charles J. Noyes.
- George H. Bond.
- Alonzo Warren.
- John F. McMahon.
- Joseph H. O'Neil.
- Timothy B. Spillane.
- J. Q. A. Brackett.
- John Sweetser.
- Henry D. Hyde.
- Lewis Coleman.
- John Joyce.
- Francis E. Hines.
- Payson E. Tucker.
- James B. Graham.
- Henry W. Fuller.
- Arthur W. Tufts.
- W. H. Carberry.
- Matthew Bolles.
- H. A. Johnson.
- Joseph Wiswell.
- Edward B. Callender.
- Joseph Bennett.
- Elbridge C. O'Donnell.
- Charles H. Ferson.
- Rufus Trussell.
- Amos Rowe.
- Stephen Rich.
- Charles H. Wonson.
- John F. James.
- J. Albert Brake.
- John I. Baker.
- Charles S. Osgood.
- George D. Glover.
- Horace Brown.
- Nathaniel A. Horton.
- William P. Proctor.
- Charles. H. Litchman.
- Amasa C. Robinson.
- C. A. Wentworth.
- Daniel R. Pinkham.
- William Lyon.
- Thomas H. Day.
- Henry Wardwell.
- Dudley Bradstreet.
- Newton P. Frye.
- William S. Coggin.
- Ben F. Atkinson.
- Samson Levy.
- Albert Kimball.
- Orrin Warren.
- Albert S. Adams.
- William A. Brooks.
- D. Smith Kimball.
- Edmund P. Sargent.
- Abel Webster.
- Joseph J. Nichols.
- Levi Emery.
- Jesse Moulton.
- Edwin B. Hale.
- George W. Park.
- Lucius R. Paige.
- A. Carter Webber.
- James H. Sparrow.
- Joseph J. Kelley.
- R. E. Nickerson.
- James Long.
- Charles S. Lincoln.
- Jacob T. Glines.
- John H. Hooper.
- Elisha S. Converse.
- James P. Magee.
- Joseph D. WIlde.
- John F. Berry.
- Azel James.
- Daniel H. Wadlin.
- Montressor S. Seeley.
- Josiah F. Stone.
- William H. Ingraham.
- Levi C. Wade.
- Charles E. Ranlett.
- David Randall.
- Augustus E. Scott.
- John W. Peabody.
- William M. Hoar.
- L. R. J. Varnum.
- Robert E. Crowley.
- James W. Bennett.
- Wililam H. Wiggin.
- John J. Pickman.
- Richard Barrett.
- Alonzo S. Fiske.
- Francis Bigelow.
- Jonathan Holbrook.
- J. Whittemore.
- Joel S. Clarke.
- Daniel S. Mooney.
- Edwin Whitney.
- Sumner P. Lawrence.
- Francis W. Wright.
- Frederick Thayer.
- Homer W. Darling.
- Isaac N. Croshy.
- Francis E. Fowler.
- George O. Brigham.
- Samuel R. Damon.
- Albert Barnard.
- Charles T. Crocker.
- Luther J. Brown.
- William H. Brown.
- Wilder P. Clark.
- Leander B. Morse.
- Lyman Clark.
- Chauncy Loring.
- Charles R. Bartlett.
- Theodore C. Bates.
- Joseph Smith.
- Samuel C. Paine.
- George D. Woodbury.
- Robert Humphrey.
- George F. Rice.
- David F. Wood.
- George F. Colburn.
- Thomas J. Hastings.
- William A. S. Smyth.
- Frank D. Leary.
- M. J. McCafferty.
- James H. Mellen.
- Joseph H. Walker.
- Calvin L. Hartshorn.
- John D. Washburn.
- William M. Gaylord.
- Henry M. Sheldon.
- Royal M. Montague.
- Alvan Barrus.
- Edward P. Crowell.
- Fred N. Hosmer.
- William J. Ricketts.
- Benjamin F. Burr.
- Frank H. Morton.
- William Pynchman.
- J. E. Shipman.
- Charles R. Ladd.
- Eleazer S. Beebe.
- F. B. Maynard.
- Thomas L. Keough.
- Joseph Murray.
- Merritt Van Deusen.
- James H. Bryan.
- E. D. Dickinson.
- Rufus Livermore.
- Joseph F. Bartlett.
- Eben A. Hall.
- Charles P. Aldrich.
- Richard H. Hoyt.
- Leonard B. Rice.
- B. F. Maher.
- Horace M. Holmes.
- W. F. Darby.
- Francis W. Rockwell.
- Solomon N. Russell.
- Leonard McCullock.
- Elizur Smith.
- Samuel M. Reynolds.
- Maloy J. Smith.
- Tyler Thayer.
- Edward I. Thomas.
- William J. Stuart.
- Horace E. Ware.
- Edwin W. Marsh.
- Edwin B. Pratt.
- Freeman Hollis.
- George D. Willis.
- John T. Flood.
- Henry S. Clark.
- Hiram Whitling.
- Elijah B. Daniels.
- Wililam S. Tilden.
- John Stanley.
- William D. Witherell.
- Ehmer Lincoln.
- John W. Hart.
- William Reed.
- John D. Reed.
- E. G. Morton.
- Rufus A. Soule.
- James M. Lawton.
- Andrew Bulloch.
- William Sanders.
- William P. Macomber.
- Patrick M. McGlynn.
- John W. Cummings.
- Marcus Leonard.
- Andrew J. Jennings.
- Daniel Wilbur.
- J. E. Eastabrooks.
- Arthur Lincoln.
- William C. Litchfield.
- George F. Stetson.
- William Savery.
- Charles H. Howland.
- Judah Hathaway.
- Matthew H. Cushing.
- George P. Harden.
- John W. Everson.
- Henry Copeland.
- Alfred C. Monroe.
- Henry W. Powers.
- Isaiah Fish.
- Andrew Lovell.
- Thomas P. Howes.
- Rufus Smith.
- Elisha Crocker.
- Bangs A. Lewis.
- Benjamin Clough.
- Henry Paddack.

== See also ==
- 1879 Massachusetts gubernatorial election
- 46th United States Congress
- List of Massachusetts General Courts
