= Leander M. Hannum =

Massachusetts state legislator

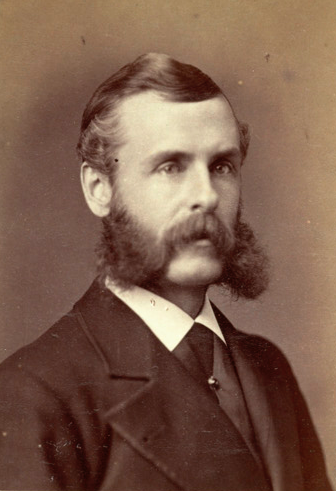
Hannum in 1876

Leander Moody Hannum (December 22, 1837 - September 1908) was a real estate and mortgage brokerage businessman who served as a state legislator in Massachusetts. He served in the Massachusetts House of Representatives and Massachusetts Senate. At the time of his death, he was described as one of the most prominent businessmen in Cambridge, Massachusetts.

He was born in Northampton, Massachusetts to Alexander C. and Laura A. née Moody Hannum. He was educated at the public schools in Northampton and Chicopee, Williston Seminary, and the English and Classical Institute in Springfield. He moved to California to work as a miner. After returning east he worked in retail, got into the grocery and ice businesses, and was involved in real estate.

He served on the Board of Water Commissioners and was a special commissioner for Middlesex County. He belonged to various fraternal organizations and the Congregational Church.

A Republican, he served on Calbridge's Common Council and Board of Alderman. He married Anne Howard Demain December 15, 1869. She died September 17, 1909. His sister lived at their home.

== See also ==
- 1876 Massachusetts legislature
- 1877 Massachusetts legislature
- 1881 Massachusetts legislature
- 1882 Massachusetts legislature
