= Senator Wales (disambiguation) =

John Wales (1783–1863) was a U.S. Senator from Delaware from 1849 to 1851.

Senator Wales may also refer to:

- B. Roger Wales (1879–1929), New York State Senate
- Nathaniel Wales (American politician) (1819–1901), Massachusetts State Senate
