= 1878 Massachusetts legislature =

99th Massachusetts General Court
←	98th	100th	→

Overview
- Legislative body: General Court
- Election: November 6, 1877

Senate
- Members: 40
- President: John B. D. Cogswell
- Party control: Republican

House
- Members: 240
- Speaker: John Davis Long
- Party control: Republican

Sessions
- 1st: January 2, 1878 – May 17, 1878

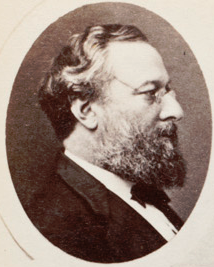
John Cogswell, Senate president.

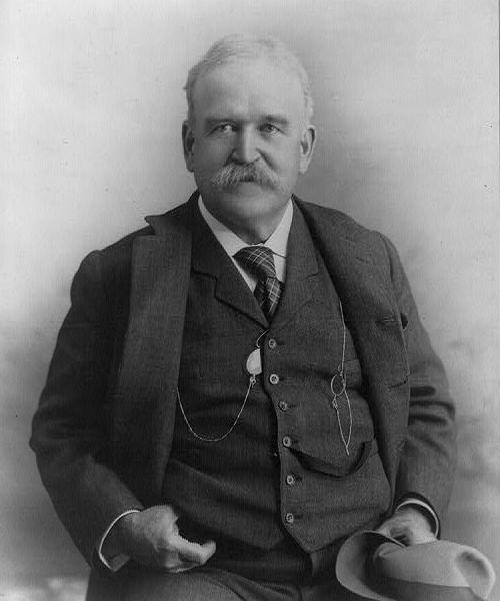
John Long, House speaker.

Leaders of the Massachusetts General Court, 1878.

The 99th Massachusetts General Court, consisting of the Massachusetts Senate and the Massachusetts House of Representatives, met in 1878 during the governorship of Alexander H. Rice. John B. D. Cogswell served as president of the Senate and John Davis Long served as speaker of the House.

== Senators ==
Image	Name	Date of birth	District	Party
	James Cochran Abbott	1825		
	Charles Adams	1810		
	Henry Francis Barker	1838		
	George Sumner Barton	1825		
	Joseph Sampson Beal	1814		
	Robert Roberts Bishop	March 13, 1834		
	Amos Franklin Breed	October 15, 1830		
	Frederic Perry Brown	1840		
	Alvah Augustus Burrage	1823		
	Horace John Canfield	1834		
	George Washington Cate	1834		
	Abraham Burbank Coffin	1831		
	John Bear Doane Cogswell	June 6, 1829		
	Ezra Davol	1838		
	Marcellus Day	1833		
	Frederick David Ely	September 24, 1838		
	Henry Clandins Ewing	1844		
	Michael Joseph Flatley	1823		
	Charles Lefevre Gardner	1839		
	Lewis Newton Gilbert	1836		
	Thomas Gogin	1824		
	James John Howard Gregory	1827		
	Benjamin Franklin Hayes			
	Henry Bozyol Hill	1823		
	William Allen Hodges	1834		
	Charles Jarvis Holmes	1834		
	Hosea Morrill Knowlton	1847		
	William Knowlton	1809		
	Ebenezer Bissell Lynde	1823		
	Charles Henry Merriam	1822		
	Albert Palmer	January 17, 1831		
	Allan Rogers	September 6, 1832		
	Joseph Samuel Ropes	February 6, 1818		
	Charles Theodore Russell	November 20, 1815		
	Amos Joseph Saunders	1826		
	Luther Henry Sherman	1838		
	Jackson Benjamin Swett	1815		
	Byron Truell	1834		
	James White	1828		
	Jonathan White	1819		
	Henry Winn	1837		

== Representatives ==
image	Name	Date of birth	District	Party
	Charles Phelps Aldrich	1832		
	Charles Hastings Allen	1828		
	James Howe Ames	1842		
	Israel Warren Andrews	1820		
	Job Kelly Anthony	1834		
	George Minott Baker	1826		
	John Israel Baker	1812		
	Alonzo Bancroft	1820		
	Charles Ellis Barnes	1840		
	Sidney Barnes	1831		
	George Varnum Barrett	1839		
	Elisha Parks Bartholomew	1847		
	James Edward Taylor Bartlett	1825		
	Theodore Dwight Beach	1821		
	Melvin Beal	1832		
	George C. Belcher	August 26, 1844		
	Myron Wallace Bent	1849		
	Joseph Billings	1842		
	Francis William Bird	1809		
	William Blanchard	1821		
	William Bradford Bliss	1834		
	Matthew Bolles	1807		
	Henry Clay Bonney	1841		
	John Quincy Adams Brackett	June 8, 1842		
	George Otis Brigham	1822		
	William Allen Brooks	1835		
	Luther Julius Brown	1827		
	Martin Wait Burnett	1815		
	Charles Webster Bush	1834		
	Charles Ruthven Byram	1844		
	William Henry Carberry	February 22, 1851		
	Francis Carll	1825		
	Lewis Carroll	1845		
	Charles Allen Case	1846		
	Alvin B. Chamberlain	December 16, 1842		
	Nahum Chapin	1820		
	Charles Henry Chase	1835		
	Leonard Clark	1821		
	Benjamin Clough	1819		
	Philander Cobb	1818		
	Hiram Boardman Coffin	1836		
	Samuel Coffin	October 9, 1827		
	George Franklin Colburn	1830		
	Elisha S. Converse	July 28, 1820		
	William Henry Cook	January 7, 1843		
	Hiram Nathaniel Cooke	1834		
	John Cornell	1830		
	Israel Clark Cornish	1850		
	George Albert Cowdrey	1848		
	John W. Cummings	August 25, 1855		
	Thomas Cunningham	1815		
	John Warren Curtice	1839		
	Jason Langdon Curtis	1824		
	Orson Ballou Curtis	1825		
	Levi Lincoln Cushing	1825		
	Anthony Charles Daly	1853		
	Charles Augustine Davis	1847		
	Robert Lewis Davis	1822		
	Cornelius Desmond	1838		
	Abiathar Doane	1820		
	Freeman Doane	1819		
	Daniel Doherty	1838		
	Jarvis Nelson Dunham	1828		
	Edward Rutledge Eager	1830		
	William Irving Ellis	1829		
	Levi Emery	1817		
	James Webster Emory	1826		
	Noble W. Everett	February 20, 1827		
	John Barnard Fairbank	1839		
	Lucius Field	August 15, 1840		
	Ralph Adams Field	1837		
	Isaiah Fish	1811		
	Charles Fisher	1829		
	John Thomas Flood	1845		
	Gardner French	1811		
	John Henry Galligan	1851		
	Nelson Gardner	1815		
	Francis Gargan	1847		
	Edwin Gilbert	1820		
	Freeman L. Gilman	1830		
	Jacob Taylor Glines	1817		
	Frank Palmer Goulding	1837		
	Thomas Robinson Greene	1806		
	Edwin Blaisdell Hale	1839		
	Noah Leonard Hardy	1828		
	John Williams Hart	1826		
	Edward Howard Haskell	1845		
	Thomas Jones Hastings	January 24, 1835		
	Rawson Hathaway	1828		
	Thomas Bly Hathaway	December 5, 1825		
	Nathan Mortimer Hawkes	1843		
	Alanson Knox Hawks	1828		
	George Frederic Hayden	1836		
	James Hildreth	1839		
	Clement Hugh Hill	1836		
	Hamilton Andrews Hill	1827		
	John Henry Hooper	1833		
	Asa Frederic Howe	1845		
	Simon Herbert Howe	1835		
	William Howe	1814		
	Thomas Prince Howes	1817		
	John Humphrey	1826		
	Eben Hutchinson	1841		
	Henry Dwight Hyde	1838		
	Charles Halstead Ingalls	1840		
	John Jackson	1822		
	Charles Volbert Jaeger	1846		
	Edward John Jenkins	1854		
	Andrew Jackson Jennings	1849		
	Henry Augustus Johnson	1818		
	Augustine Jones	1835		
	Joseph James Kelley	1842		
	Jarvis Plato Kelly	1833		
	Patrick Keyes	1830		
	Ensign Kimball	1818		
	William Sterling King	1818		
	Marcus Perrin Knowlton	February 3, 1839		
	Frank Daniel Leary	1854		
	Edwin Forrest Leighton	1839		
	James Foster Leonard	1837		
	John Arnold Lewis	1833		
	George Caleb Lincoln	1821		
	James Lovering Locke	1832		
	Andrew Lovell	1813		
	Benjamin Starks Lovell	1845		
	John Dana Lovell	1818		
	George W. Lowther	1822		
	Pardon Macomber	February 9, 1833		
	William Penn Macomber	1832		
	John Mahon	1832		
	James Thomas Mahony	1843		
	William Manning	1823		
	Frederic A. Marden	1843		
	John Marlor	1845		
	Edwin Wilson Marsh	1821		
	George Sampson Marshall	1833		
	Samuel Stukey McGibbons	1826		
	Patrick Michael McGlynn	1853		
	Ebenezer Martin McPherson	1836		
	James Henry Mellen	1845		
	Artemas Merriam			
	Amos Washington Merritt	1833		
	Phillips Moore	1835		
	Albert Moors	1828		
	Elbridge Gerry Morton	1841		
	Frederick Pierce Moseley	1826		
	Patrick Francis Murphy	1860		
	John Franklin Newton	1829		
	Richard Elliott Nickerson	1830		
	Joseph Gilbert Noble	1837		
	Eugene L. Norton	March 26, 1825		
	Charles Johnson Noyes	1841		
	Chauncey Orman Noyes	1840		
	James H. Nugent	1831		
	Joseph Henry O'Neil	March 23, 1853		
	William Clift Oakman	1809		
	Charles Stuart Osgood	1839		
	John Lord Otis	1827		
	Henry Brett Packard	1823		
	Henry Paddack	April 2, 1838		
	Calvin Paige	May 20, 1848		
	Lucius R. Paige	1802		
	Joseph Sumner Parmenter	1827		
	David Allen Partridge	1833		
	William Gaylord Peck	1841		
	James Phillip Peirce	1835		
	Josiah Perry	1832		
	Benjamin Ashton Phillips	1838		
	James Davis Pike	1829		
	Albert Enoch Pillsbury	August 19, 1849		
	Timothy Dimmick Potter	1840		
	Henry Webster Powers	1837		
	Charles Jones Prescott	1838		
	George Price	1806		
	Henry Wheatland Putnam	1843		
	William Pynchon	1820		
	Oliver James Rand	1820		
	David Randall	1818		
	Charles Everett Ranlett	1816		
	William Arthur Read	1849		
	William Reed	October 3, 1820		
	William Reed Jr.	December 2, 1842		
	George Willard Rice	1836		
	James Henry Richards	1839		
	Jesper Richardson	1821		
	John Wesley Ricker	1824		
	Michael Rinn	1847		
	William Robinson	1835		
	Solomon Nash Russell	1822		
	Baalis Sanford	1833		
	Edmund Pillsbury Sargent	1823		
	Lucius Manlius Sargent	1836		
	John Bernard Shea	1851		
	Henry Shortle	1834		
	Matthew Smith	1814		
	William Augustus Somerset Smyth	1824		
	Rufus Albertson Soule	1839		
	Pliny Fisk Spaulding	1821		
	Timothy Gridley Spaulding	1851		
	Leander Sprague	1824		
	Stephen Abbott Stackpole	1819		
	Henry Salmon Stiles	1818		
	Eben Francis Stone	August 3, 1822		
	William James Stuart	1828		
	Ezekiel Reed Studley	1831		
	Van Rensselaer Swift	1813		
	Zadok Arnold Taft	1817		
	Edward Isaiah Thomas	1833		
	Leonard Thompson	1817		
	Charles Frederick Thurston	1844		
	John Wilson Tilton	1844		
	Payson Elliott Tucker	1834		
	Thomas J. Tucker			
	John Turner	1827		
	Horace Underwood	1828		
	Levi Clifford Wade	1843		
	Alexander Wadsworth	1806		
	Abijah Tyler Wales	1833		
	James Lawrence Walsh	1843		
	Solon Walton	1830		
	Alonzo Warren	1827		
	John Davis Washburn	1833		
	Abel Webster	1818		
	Edwin R. Webster	1831		
	Samuel Hidden Wentworth			
	Daniel Nathaniel White	1830		
	Newton White	1813		
	Joseph Whitehead	1823		
	Sydney Franklin Whitehouse	1822		
	Charles Stimson Whitmore	1815		
	William Howe Wiggin	1823		
	Henry Munson Wilcox	1843		
	Henry Hills Wilder	1824		
	Sydney Wilder	1813		
	George Andrew Wilson	1825		
	John Winn	July 3, 1828		
	Joseph Wiswell	1816		
	Charles Henry Wonson	1843		
	Solon Wood	1834		
	John Henry Wright	1843		
	Oliver Brown Wyman	1826		

== See also ==
- 1878 Massachusetts gubernatorial election
- 45th United States Congress
- List of Massachusetts General Courts
