= Senator Harding =

Senator Harding may refer to:

== Members of the United States Senate ==
- Benjamin F. Harding (1823–1899), U.S. Senator from Oregon from 1862 to 1865
- Warren G. Harding (1865–1923), U.S. Senator from Ohio from 1915 to 1921

== United States state senate members ==
- Alpheus Harding (1818–1903), Massachusetts State Senate
- George F. Harding Jr. (fl. 1900s–1930s), Illinois State Senate
- J. Eugene Harding (1877–1959), Ohio State Senate
- Stephen Harding (politician) (born 1987), Connecticut State Senate
