= George W. Lowther =

American politician

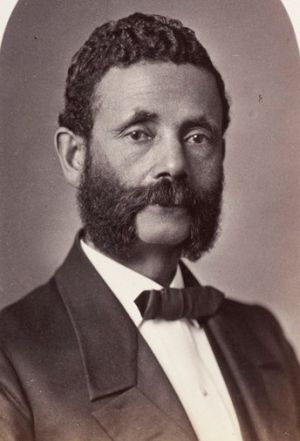

Massachusetts House of Representatives
- In office 1878–1880

Personal details
- Born: c. 1822 Edenton, North Carolina
- Died: October 5, 1898 (aged 75–76) Boston, Massachusetts
- Party: Republican

George W. Lowther (c. 1822 - 1898) was an American barber, state representative, and civil rights activist. He served in the Massachusetts House of Representatives. The State Library of Massachusetts has a photograph of him. A Republican, he served in the state house in 1878 and 1879. He was involved in the temperance movement.

== See also ==
- 1878 Massachusetts legislature
- 1879 Massachusetts legislature
- African American officeholders from the end of the Civil War until before 1900
