= John Howlett (disambiguation) =

John Howlett is an English author and screenwriter

John Howlett may also refer to:

- John Howlett (cricketer) (1868–1931), Australian cricketer
- John Howlett (political economist) (1731–1804), English political economist and cleric
- John Howlett (miller), American tobacco manufacturer and politician
