= Nathaniel Wales =

Nathaniel Wales may refer to:

- Nathaniel Wales (American politician), American businessman and politician from Massachusetts
- Nathaniel Young Armstrong Wales, New Zealand architect and politician
- Nathaniel B. Wales, American inventor
