= Charles Swain =

Charles Swain may refer to:

- Charles Swain (athlete) (1885–1974), Australian athlete
- Charles Swain (poet) (1801–1874), English poet and engraver
- Charles L. Swain (1866–?), Democratic politician from Ohio, United States
- Charles Bunker Swain, member of the Massachusetts House of Representatives in 1877
