= DeWitt Clinton Baxter =

American general, artist and engraver

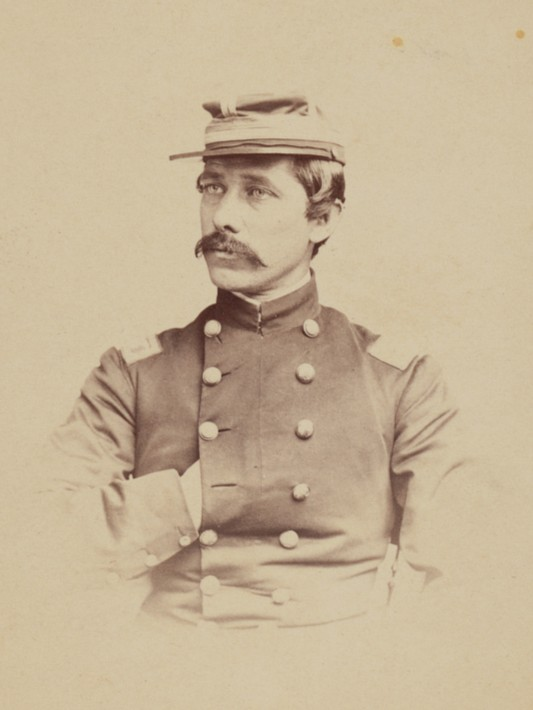
Baxter, c. 1861 – 1865

DeWitt Clinton Baxter (1829–1881) was an American artist and engraver. He also served as colonel and brevet brigadier general in the Union Army during the American Civil War.

== Early life ==
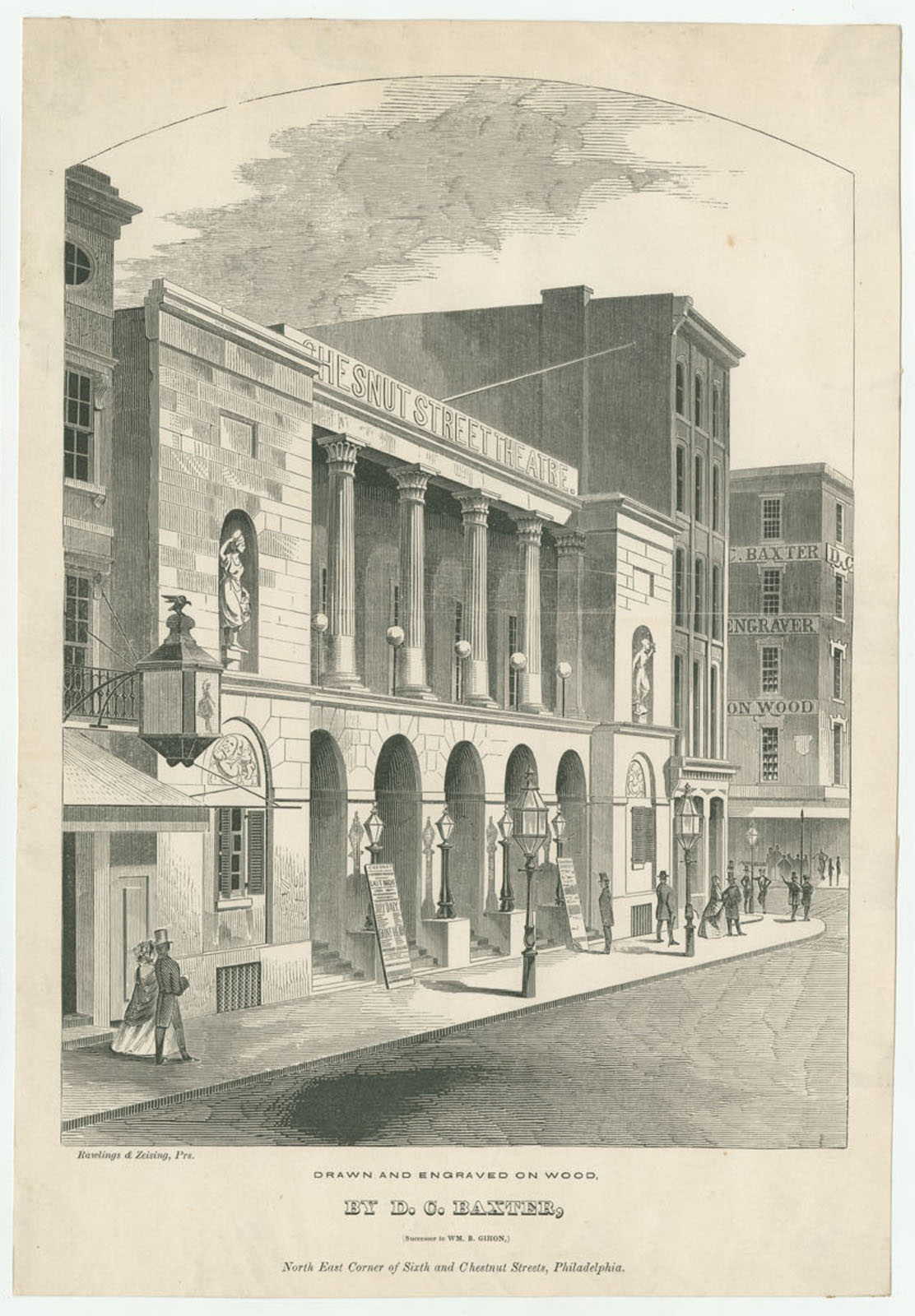
Engraving by D. C. Baxter, c. 1850s

DeWitt Clinton Baxter was born March 9, 1829, in Dorchester, Massachusetts. In early city directories identified Baxter as an "engraver" (1850–60), "designer" (1861), and "artist" (1862) as he was publisher of "The Baxter Panoramic Business Directory" in Philadelphia. From 1857 on he lived at 454 North Eighth Street, a substantial townhouse (3 stories, 24-feet wide) near Buttonwood Street, and from 1855 until the Civil War he had an office in Hart's Building at the northeast corner of Sixth and Chestnut.

== Civil War ==
In April 1861 Baxter became Lieutenant Colonel of the 19th Pennsylvania Volunteer Infantry, but when that three-month enlistment expired, he organized and led the 72nd Pennsylvania Volunteers, "Baxter's Fire Zouaves." They were drawn from the various fire companies of Philadelphia, and were known for their peculiar Zouave uniforms and precise bayonet drills. They "enjoyed a brief period of considerable popularity, so much so, that the citizens of Philadelphia crowded the Academy of Music to witness" their maneuvers on stage."

Baxter recorded his expertise in such exercises in an illustrated 1861 book, The Volunteer's Manual; containing full instructions for the recruit. . . , which was published by King & Baird, the same firm that published his early panaoramas.

=== Field commands ===
- 19th Pennsylvania Infantry Regiment; Lieutenant Colonel April 1861 – July 1861
- 72nd Pennsylvania Infantry Regiment; Colonel July 1861 – July 1863. He led the regiment in the Peninsula Campaign, Antietam Campaign at the Battle of Fredericksburg, the Battle of Gettysburg and the Battle of Wilderness. He was wounded July 2, 1863 at the Battle of Gettysburg.
- Philadelphia Brigade; Colonel July 1863 – December 10, 1863
- 2nd Division, II Corps; Colonel December 10, 1863 – December 21, 1863
- 72nd Pennsylvania Infantry Regiment; Colonel December 21, 1863 – May 1864. He was "severely wounded at the Wilderness" in May 1864, "shot through the lungs."
- Promoted to brevet brigadier general in March 1865.

== Later life ==
After the war, Baxter was a naval officer at the Custom House from 1867–1871.

In the mid-1870s he was involved in the Keystone Portable Forge Company. He also may have revived his Panoramic Directory business in the late 1870s. Upon his death in May 1881, his obituary reported, Baxter was holding "a position at the Custom house." He died on May 9, 1881, and his obituary appeared on the front-page the following day in the Philadelphia Public Ledger.

Originally buried in Monument Cemetery in Philadelphia, he was reinterred in Lawnview Memorial Park in 1956.
