= Josiah Freeman =

American politician

Member of the Massachusetts House of Representatives Nantucket District
- In office 1882–1883
- Preceded by: Henry Paddack
- Succeeded by: John William Hallett

Personal details
- Born: Nantucket, Massachusetts
- Occupation: Photographer

Josiah Freeman was an American photographer, and politician, who in 1882 and 1883, served as a member of the Massachusetts House of Representatives.
