= Tilly Haynes =

State legislator and businessman in Massachusetts

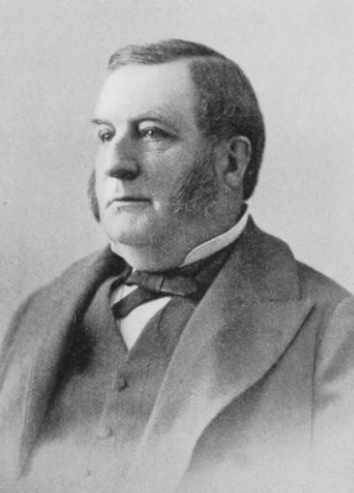

Theodore "Tully" Haynes (February 13, 1828 - August 1901) was a hotel and music hall proprietor who served two terms in the Massachusetts House of Representatives. He owned the Haynes Hotel in Springfield, Massachusetts.

He was born in Sudbury, Massachusetts on February 13, 1828, the son of Lyman and Caroline née Hunt Haynes. He attended school in Billerica. He worked at general stores before starting his own men's clothing store. He was involved with mills. He built a music hall in Springfield that burnt down. He built another and a hotel.

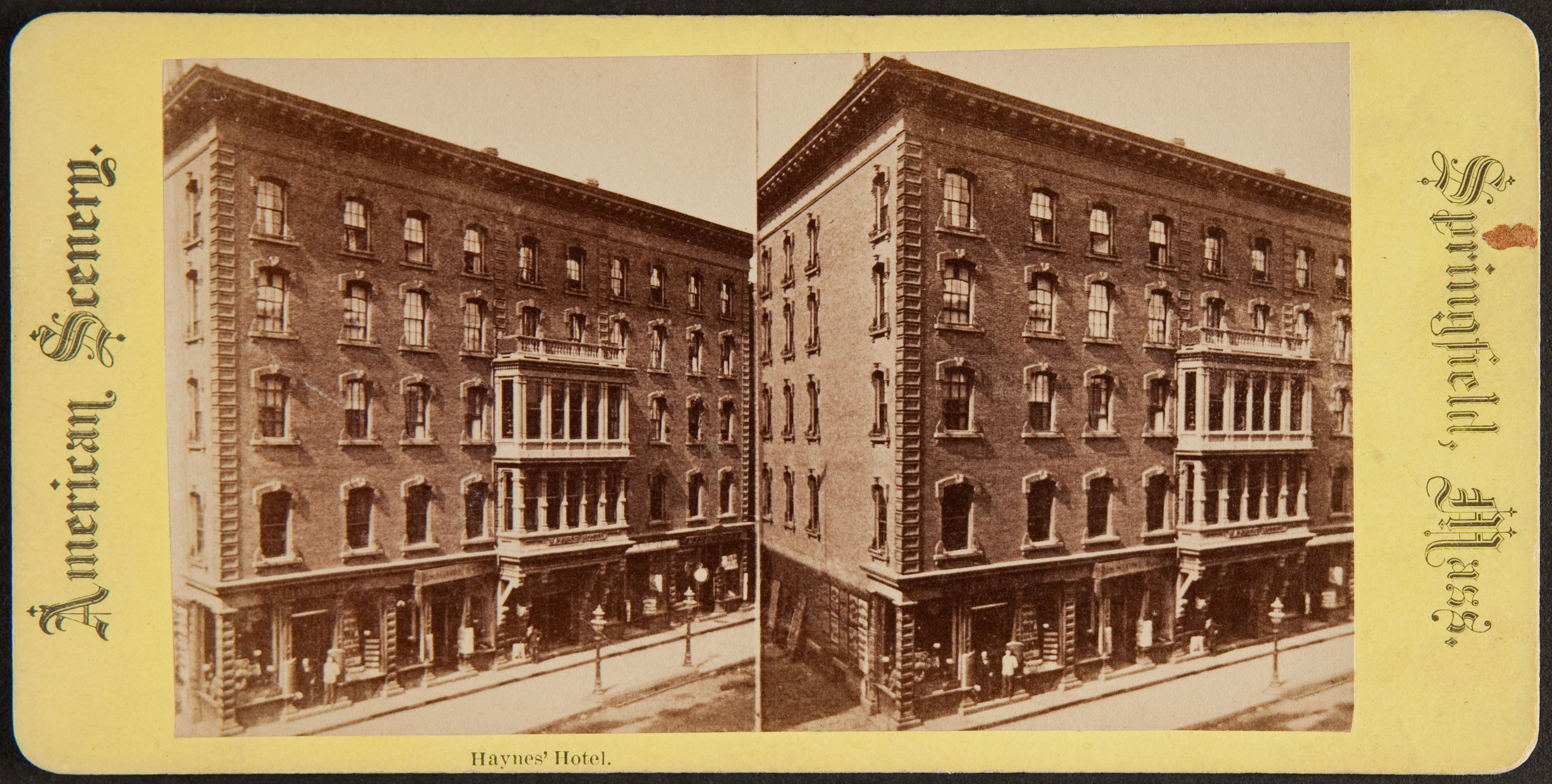
Stereoscopic image of Hayne's Hotel ca. 1883

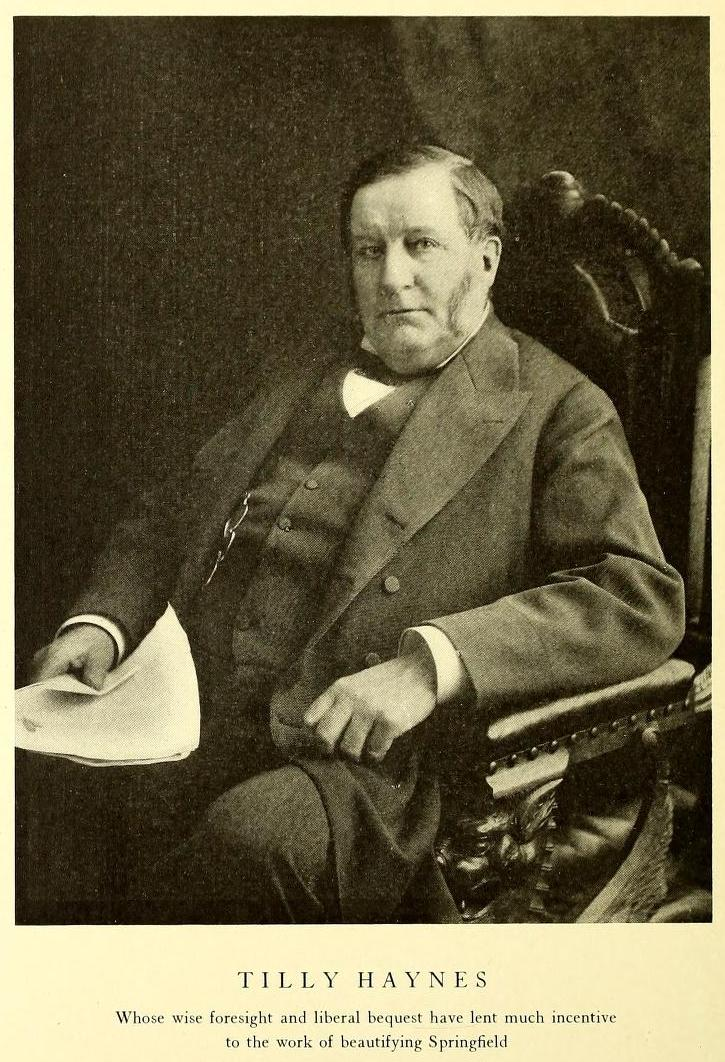

He served in the Massachusetts House of Representatives from 1867 to 1870 and in the Massachusetts Senate from 1875 to 1878.

== See also ==
- 1877 Massachusetts legislature
