= John B. D. Cogswell =

American politician (1829–1889)

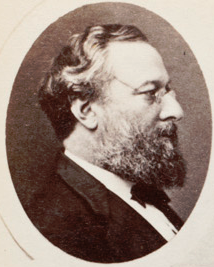

50th President of the Massachusetts Senate
- In office January 3, 1877 – January 7, 1880
- Preceded by: George B. Loring
- Succeeded by: Robert R. Bishop

Member of the Massachusetts Senate from the Cape district
- In office January 3, 1877 – January 7, 1880
- Preceded by: Jonathan Higgins
- Succeeded by: Samuel Snow

Member of the Massachusetts House of Representatives from the Barnstable 1st district
- In office January 4, 1871 – January 7, 1874 Serving with Henry Goodspeed (1871), Ezra Howard (1871 & 1872), Nathaniel Sears (1872 & 1873), and Philip H. Robinson (1873)
- Preceded by: Francis A. Nye, Henry Goodspeed, and Warren Marchant
- Succeeded by: Levi L. Goodspeed, Philip H. Robinson, and Joshua C. Robinson

United States Attorney for the District of Wisconsin
- In office 1861–1866
- Appointed by: Abraham Lincoln
- Preceded by: Don A. J. Upham
- Succeeded by: Charles M. Webb; (Western Dist. of Wisconsin); Levi Hubbell; (Eastern Dist. of Wisconsin)

Member of the Massachusetts House of Representatives from the Worcester district
- In office January 7, 1857 – January 6, 1858 Serving with William T. Merrifield, Dexter F. Parker, George F. Thompson, and Stephen P. Twiss
- Preceded by: Harrison Bliss, Elijah B. Stoddard, Putnam W. Taft, George W. Russell, and John H. Brooks
- Succeeded by: Albert L. Benchley, Dexter F. Parker, Alexander Thayer, and James S. Woolworth

Personal details
- Born: John Bear Doane Cogswell; June 6, 1829 Yarmouth, Massachusetts
- Died: June 11, 1889 (aged 60) Haverhill, Massachusetts
- Resting place: Ancient Cemetery; Yarmouth Port, Massachusetts
- Party: Republican
- Spouse: Mary Abbot Trumbull (m. 1858–1889)
- Children: Mary Louisa Trumbull (Roberts); (b. 1861; died 1955)
- Education: Phillips Academy; Dartmouth College, A.B., 1850; Harvard Law School, LL.B., 1852
- Profession: Lawyer, author

John Bear Doane Cogswell (June 6, 1829 – June 11, 1889) was an American lawyer and Republican politician from the U.S. state of Massachusetts. He was President of the Massachusetts Senate for the 1877, 1878, and 1879 sessions, and was United States Attorney for the District of Wisconsin during the presidency of Abraham Lincoln.

== Biography ==
Cogswell prepared for college at Phillips Academy and graduated from Dartmouth College in 1850. While at Dartmouth, he became a member of Zeta chapter of Psi Upsilon fraternity. After graduating, he read law in the office of Emory Washburn. In 1852, he was awarded the LL B. from Harvard Law School. He was admitted to the Worcester County in 1853 and opened a law office in Worcester, Massachusetts soon thereafter.

Cogswell represented Worcester in the Massachusetts House of Representatives in 1857. He moved to Milwaukee later that year and was admitted to the Wisconsin bar that December. From 1862 to 1867, he was the United States District attorney for Wisconsin. He was the last U.S. Attorney for Wisconsin before its division into Western and Eastern districts.

In 1870, Cogswell moved to Yarmouth, Massachusetts. He was a member of the Massachusetts House of Representatives from 1871 to 1873 and was chairman of the judiciary committee during his final two years. He was a delegate to the 1872 Republican National Convention. Cogswell was a member of the Massachusetts Senate from 1877 to 1879 and was Senate president all three years.

Cogswell retired from public life in 1880 and moved to Haverhill, Massachusetts, where he focused on writing. He was a frequent contributor to newspapers and wrote a biographical sketch of Rufus Choate that was published by the New England Historic Genealogical Society. Cogswell died in Haverhill on June 11, 1899.

== See also ==
- 1872 Massachusetts legislature
- 1873 Massachusetts legislature
- 1877 Massachusetts legislature
- 1878 Massachusetts legislature
- 1879 Massachusetts legislature

Massachusetts Senate
Preceded by Jonathan Higgins	Member of the Massachusetts Senate from the Cape district January 3, 1877 – January 7, 1880	Succeeded by Samuel Snow
Preceded by George B. Loring	President of the Massachusetts Senate; January 3, 1877 – January 7, 1880	Succeeded by Robert R. Bishop
Legal offices
Preceded by Don A. J. Upham	United States Attorney for the District of Wisconsin; 1861–1866	Succeeded by Charles M. Webb (W.D. Wis.) and Levi Hubbell (E.D. Wis.)
