= Amos Franklin Breed =

American businessman and politician (1830–1900)

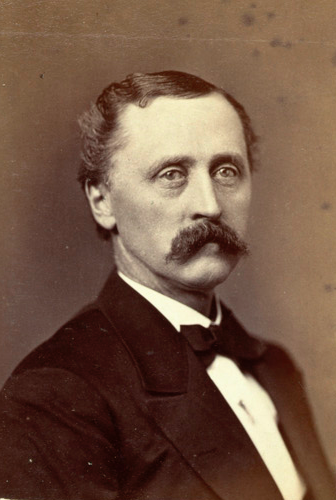
- 1876 Massachusetts state House of Representatives photo

Member of the Massachusetts House of Representatives 1865–1866
- In office 1876–1877

Member of the Massachusetts Senate from the Essex County first district
- In office 1877–1878

Personal details
- Born: October 15, 1830 Lynn, Massachusetts
- Died: May 22, 1900 (aged 69) Lynn, Massachusetts
- Occupation: Bank President, First National Bank of Lynn, 1874–1900; Vice President, Lynn Institution for Savings; Manager, Lynn and Boston Street Railway; President, North Shore Traction Company; President, Massachusetts Electric Companies, 1899–1900

Amos Franklin Breed (October 15, 1830 – May 22, 1900) was an American businessman and politician in Massachusetts. He was a bank and railway president and served in the state house and state senate.

He was born in Lynn, Massachusetts to Amos Breed and Frances (Fanny) née Reed Breed.

Breed lived in Lynn, and was president of the First National Bank of Lynn from 1874 until his death in 1900. He was manager of the Lynn and Boston Street Railway, then president of the North Shore Traction Company created through the absorption of the Lynn and Boston, and when North Shore was purchased and several railroads combined under a single company in 1899, he became president of the Massachusetts Electric Railway.

A Republican, he served on the common council and board of aldermen. He served as a member of the Massachusetts state House of Representatives in 1865–6 and again in 1876, and was a member of the Massachusetts Senate in 1877 and 1878 for the first district of Essex County. He served on the Treasury committee in 1877. In 1880 and 1896 he was a delegate to the Republican National Convention.

Breed married Mary Ann Lindsey on December 7, 1854. He was survived by two sons including Amos Franklin Breed Jr. Jr.. He is buried at Pine Grove Cemetery.

== See also ==
- 1865 Massachusetts legislature
- 1866 Massachusetts legislature
- 1876 Massachusetts legislature
- 1877 Massachusetts legislature
- 1878 Massachusetts legislature
