= Haynes Hotel =

- Haynes Hotel / Waters Building
- U.S. National Register of Historic Places
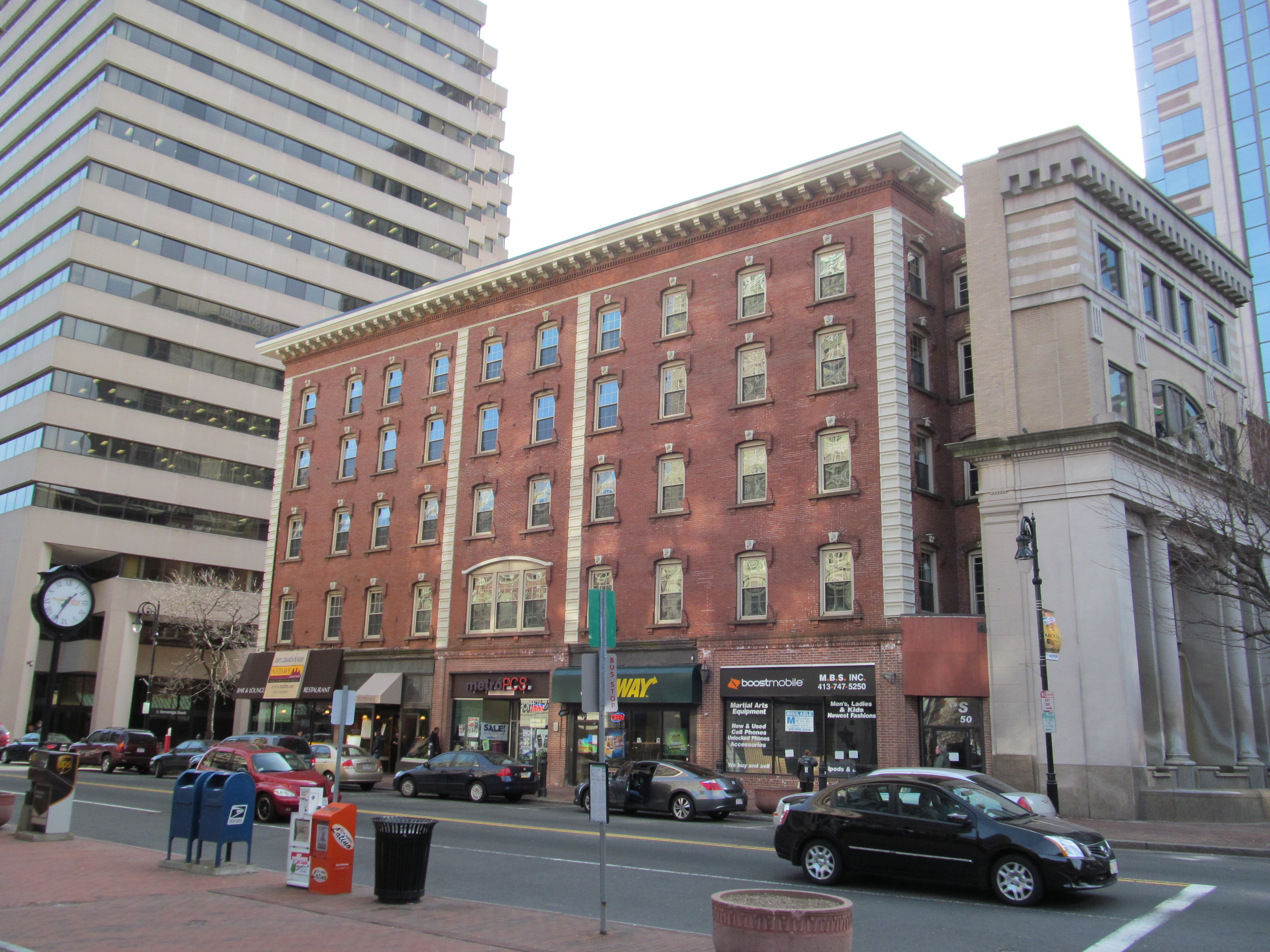

- Location within Massachusetts Location within the United States
- Location: Springfield, Massachusetts
- Coordinates: 42°6′8″N 72°35′26″W
- Area: less than one acre
- Built: 1865
- Architectural style: Italianate
- MPS: Downtown Springfield MRA
- NRHP reference No.: 83000751
- Added to NRHP: February 24, 1983

The Haynes Hotel or Waters Building is a historic building at 1386-1402 Main Street in Springfield, Massachusetts. Built in 1864, it was the first of the city's grand hotels, and is one of its last surviving examples of Italianate commercial architecture. Now filled with retail and office space, the building was listed on the National Register of Historic Places in 1983.

== Description and history ==
The former Haynes Hotel is located in downtown Springfield, on the south side of Main Street at its junction with Pynchon Street (now a pedestrian zone). A five-story masonry structure built out of load-bearing brick walls with stone trim, the building corners have stone quoining and the windows are set in segmented-arch openings with bracketed lintels and shouldered and keystoned hoods. The building is capped by a projecting decorative cornice.

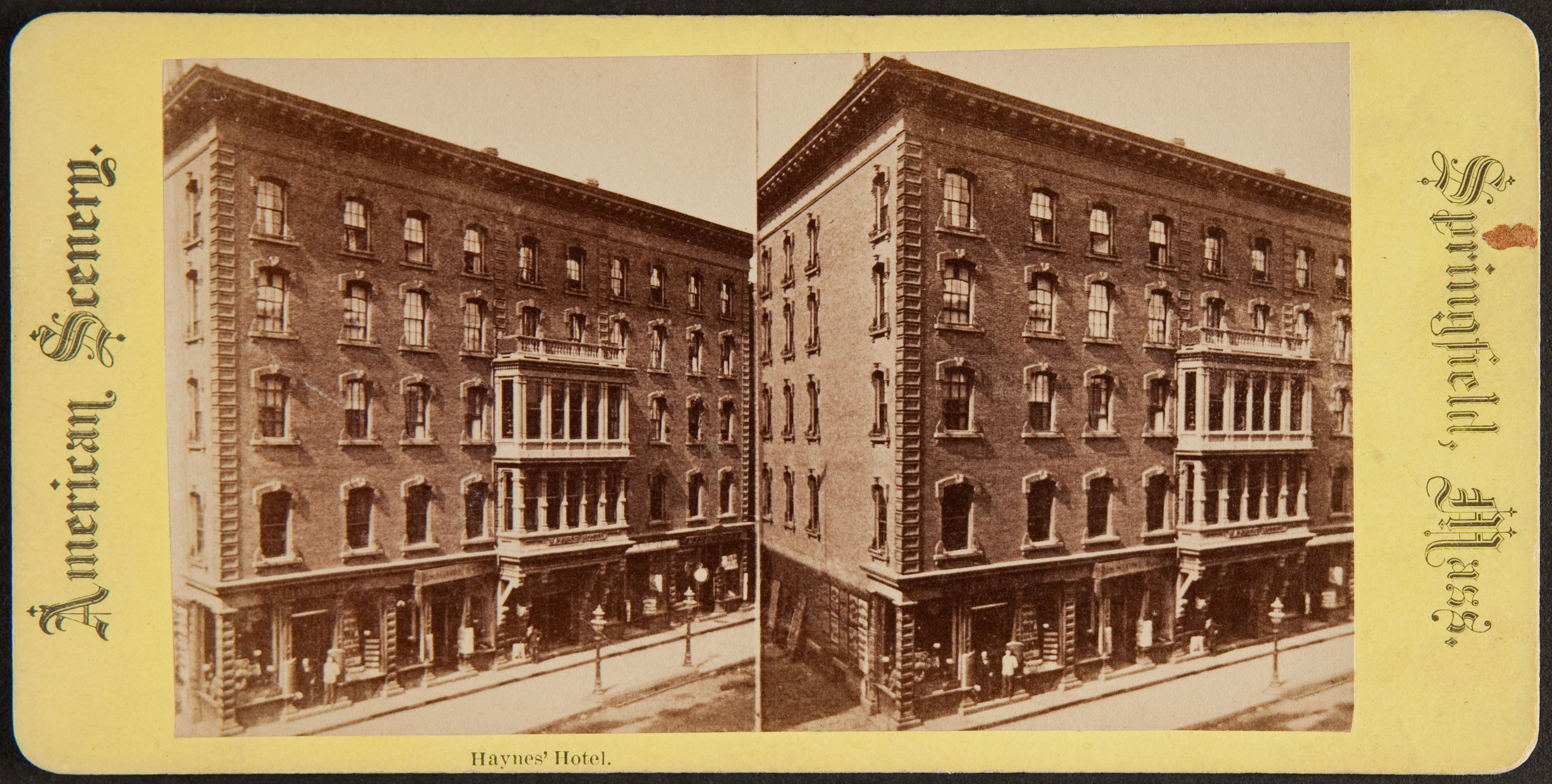
Stereoscopic image of Hayne's Hotel ca. 1883

The five story Italianate brick was built in 1864 for Theodore "Tilly" Haynes, proprietor of a men's clothing store at another location that was destroyed by fire. Haynes operated his shop and a hotel on the site, and the post office also operated in the corner space of the building until the 1880s. The hotel was one of the largest in the city of the time, feature a grand central lobby with a skylight. It was eventually eclipsed by the Hotel Charles, which was larger and located nearer the railroad.

Haynes sold the property in 1876 to Clara Goodman, who purchased it for her son-in-law, H. H. Waters. In 1943 the old hotel lobby was converted to retail space, and the upper floors were converted to office space.

== See also ==
- National Register of Historic Places listings in Springfield, Massachusetts
- National Register of Historic Places listings in Hampden County, Massachusetts
