= Emerson Gaylord =

Politician in Massachusetts, US (1817–1899)

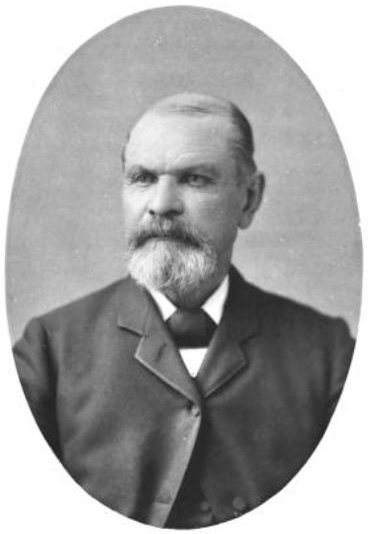

Member of the Massachusetts House of Representatives
- In office 1880–1881

Personal details
- Born: September 2, 1817 South Hadley, Massachusetts
- Died: September 24, 1899 Chicopee, Massachusetts
- Party: Republican
- Spouse: Jane Burnett (m. 1844)
- Children: 1. Arthur Gaylord
- Occupation: Businessman, politician

Emerson Gaylord (2 September 1817 – 24 September 1899) was an American businessman, and Republican politician who served in the Massachusetts General Court in 1880.

== Early life ==
Emerson Gaylord was born in South Hadley, Massachusetts on Sept. 2, 1817 to Josiah and Lucinda Smith Gaylord. His father died in 1826 when Emerson was just 9 years old. When he was 12 he left school to support himself and family on neighboring farms.

== Career ==
At the age of 17, he was apprenticed to Seth Nyms, of Amherst, to learn the harness-making business. When he returned to South Hadley, he began to learn the shoemaker's trade under George Kilbourn and then would later work in the shoe business for his cousin John Gaylord until 1840.

He would go on to accept an offer of employment in Chicopee with the N.P. Ames Company a year later; working for 7 shillings a day, which later increased to one dollar and quarter a month after. By 1843, Emerson was offered to take charge shop, but would instead take the opportunity to be contracted with the Ames Company to furnish leather goods.

In 1856, he would outright purchase the leather and accouterments division of the Ames Co. and start the manufacture of leather fire hoses and machine belting. That same year, the War Department would order military accouterments. By 1861, the company would furnish several states in the South; Maryland, Virginia, Georgia, Alabama, and Mississippi. In 1864 the state of Massachusetts ordered 1,582 of cavalry and artillery equipment for a total of $6,101.

In 1875, he would serve as president of the First National Bank of Chicopee until his death.

As of the Chicopee Directory of 1890; he would hold the following positions:

- President & Director of First National Bank of Chicopee
- VP of Chicopee Savings Bank
- President of Chicopee Water Co.
- Chairman of the Selectmen in 1890 (City Council)
- Director of the Maplegrove Cemetery Association

== Political office ==
He served the commonwealth for two years (1880–1881) in the state senate as a representatives from Chicopee, where he served as 2nd Rep. of Hampden County.

== Personal life ==
When Gaylord moved to Chicopee, he became a member of the Third Congregational Church on Springfield Street. In 1844, Gaylord married Jane Burnett, a native of South Hadley. They would have one son named Arthur together.

== Gaylord Mansion ==
In 1856, Gaylord purchased a house at the corner of Springfield Street and Fairview Avenue from H.H. Phetteplace, and by the 1870s, he owned the entire block and demolished the original structure to build a new home currently known as the Gaylord Mansion.

In 1962, Elms College purchased the Gaylord Mansion for $50,000. In 1997, an Elms College Cornerstone Campaign raised $100,000 to refurbish the exterior of this historical treasure. In February 2020, the Gaylord mansion underwent another renovation by the college to transform the interior into a classroom-meeting space with dorm residences on the top floors dubbing it "Living-Learning, Community and Cultural Center".

illustration of Emerson Gaylord's home at the time of 1879.

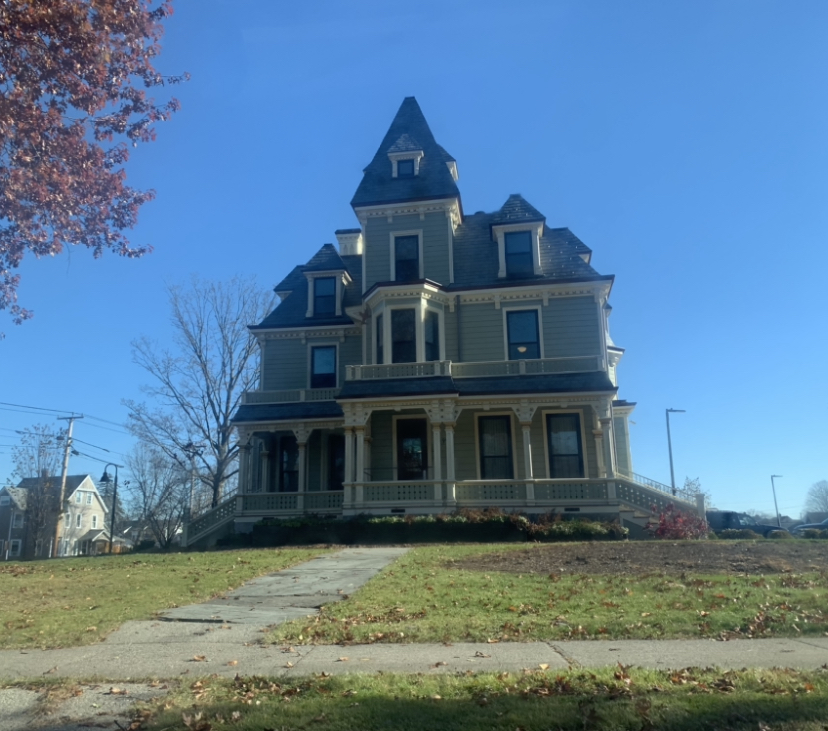
Front view of Emerson Gaylord Mansion.

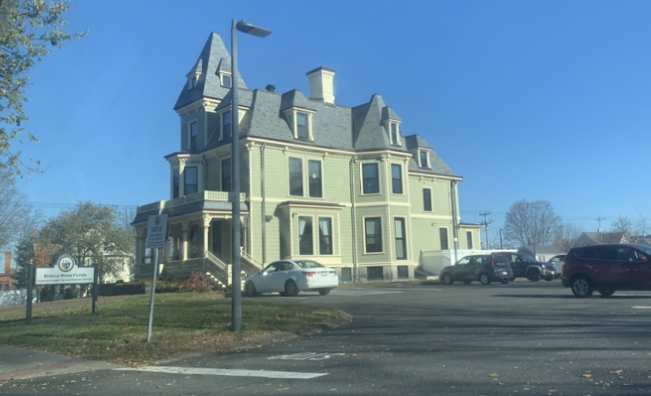
Side view of Emerson Gaylord Mansion.

== Sources ==
- Cutter, William Richard (1910). Genealogical and Personal Memoirs Relating to the Families of the State of Massachusetts. p. 5/7.
- Copeland, Alfred Minot (1902). Our County and Its People": A History of Hampden County, Massachusetts. p. 492.
- Lockwood, John Hoyt (1926). Western Massachusetts: A History, 1636-1925. p. 107.
