= 1877 Massachusetts legislature =

98th Massachusetts General Court
←	97th	99th	→

Overview
- Legislative body: General Court
- Election: November 7, 1876

Senate
- Members: 40
- President: John B. D. Cogswell
- Party control: Republican

House
- Members: 240
- Speaker: John Davis Long
- Party control: Republican

Sessions
- 1st: January 3, 1877 – May 17, 1877

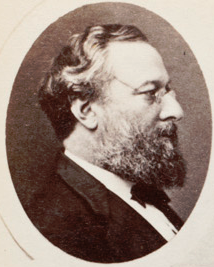
John Cogswell, Senate president.

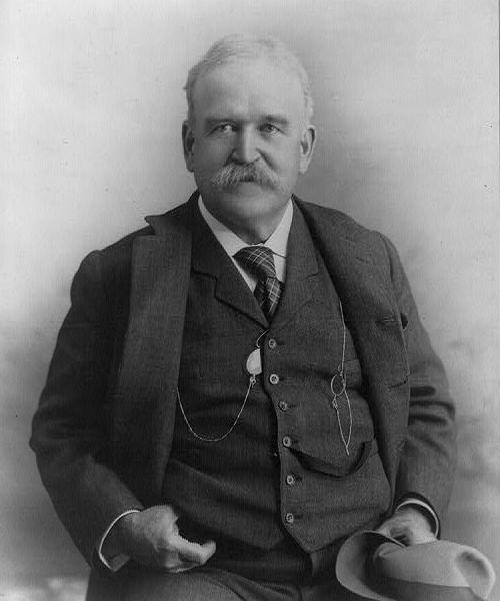
John Long, House speaker.

Leaders of the Massachusetts General Court, 1877.

The 98th Massachusetts General Court, consisting of the Massachusetts Senate and the Massachusetts House of Representatives, met in 1877 during the governorship of Alexander H. Rice. John B. D. Cogswell served as president of the Senate and John Davis Long served as speaker of the House.

== Senators ==
Image	Name	Date of birth	District	Party
	Charles Adams Jr.	1810		
	Stephen Merrill Allen	1819		
	George Sumner Barton	1825		
	Selwyn Zadock Bowman	May 11, 1840		
	Amos Franklin Breed	October 15, 1830		
	Elisha Brimhall	March 25, 1825		
	Haydn Brown	February 16, 1819		
	Abraham Burbank Coffin	1831		
	John Bear Doane Cogswell	June 6, 1829		
	Samuel Dexter Crane	1816		
	George Parkman Denny	1826		
	Henry Clandins Ewing	1844		
	Joseph Emery Fiske	1839		
	Thomas Francis Fitzgerald	1848		
	Michael Joseph Flatley	1823		
	Harrison Garfield	June 27, 1810		
	Lewis Newton Gilbert	1836		
	Samuel Slocum Ginnodo	1816		
	James John Howard Gregory	1827		
	Theodore "Tilly" Haynes	February 13, 1828		
	Henry Bozyol Hill	1823		
	Charles Jarvis Holmes	1834		
	Charles Howes	October 26, 1826		
	Francis Jewett	September 19, 1820		
	Ensign Hosmer Kellogg	July 6, 1812		
	Ebenezer Bissell Lynde	1823		
	Aaron C. Mayhew	1812		
	John Farwell Moors	December 10, 1819		
	Joshua Morse	February 24, 1822		
	Caleb Rand	1817		
	Charles Theodore Russell	November 20, 1815		
	Amos Joseph Saunders	1826		
	Luther Henry Sherman	1838		
	John Sherburne Sleeper	September 25, 1794		
	Frederick Mason Stone	1825		
	Jackson Benjamin Swett	1815		
	Byron Truell	1834		
	Francis M. Weld	1815		
	John Dwelle Whicher	1825		
	Jonathan White	1819		

== Representatives ==
image	Name	Date of birth	District	Party
	Alfred Mark Adams	1835		
	Granville Stevens Allen	1825		
	Stillman Boyd Allen	September 8, 1830		
	Job Kelly Anthony	1834		
	Samuel Atherton	January 26, 1815		
	Edwin Ayer	1827		
	John James Babson	1809		
	Thomas McCrate Babson	1847		
	Orlando Sargent Baley	1818		
	Alonzo Bancroft	1820		
	Henry Francis Barker	1838		
	Charles Ellis Barnes	1840		
	James Edward Taylor Bartlett	1825		
	Perley Bartlett	1807		
	Henry Allen Barton	1821		
	Benjamin Samuel Batchelor	1829		
	Daniel Johnson Bates	1830		
	Crocker Hinckley Bearse	1810		
	Charles David Bickford	1821		
	Abraham Orlando Bigelow	1812		
	Francis William Bird	1809		
	Warren Augustus Bird	1837		
	Stephen Henry Bodurtha	1812		
	Francis Charles Bowen	1834		
	John Quincy Adams Brackett	June 8, 1842		
	George Bradford	1819		
	Warren Sylvester Bragg	1837		
	Pharcellus Dean Bridges	December 21, 1846		
	John Henry Brown	1844		
	William Henry Harrison Bryant	1826		
	Joseph Buckminster	1821		
	Horace John Canfield	1834		
	Francis Carll	1825		
	Nahum Chapin	1820		
	Charles Henry Chase	1835		
	Lafayette Clapp	1824		
	Leonard Clark	1821		
	Wilder Philander Clark	October 12, 1832		
	John Doggett Cobb	1840		
	Aaron Cogswell	1807		
	John Draper Cogswell	1820		
	John Leonard Cole	1839		
	George Nelson Cone	1836		
	John Hawkins Cook	1841		
	William Henry Cook	January 7, 1843		
	Israel Clark Cornish	1850		
	Samuel Emmons Crocker	1834		
	Edward Johnson Crossman	1824		
	Thomas Cunningham	1815		
	Daniel Jasper Curley	April 2, 1841		
	George Fisher Daniels	1820		
	Charles Warren Davis	1826		
	George Asa Dean	1835		
	Obed Delano	1814		
	Cornelius Desmond	1838		
	Justin Dewey	1836		
	Abiathar Doane	1820		
	Daniel Doherty	1838		
	William Capar Donald	1816		
	Francis Mattby Draper	1834		
	Jarvis Nelson Dunham	1828		
	Curtis Eddy	May 18, 1838		
	Francis Sylvester Egleston	1821		
	Theodore Waterbury Ellis	1823		
	William Fuller Ellis	1820		
	William Irving Ellis	1829		
	Levi Emery	1817		
	John Barnard Fairbank	1839		
	Jackson Benjamin Farnum	1828		
	George Augustus Flagg	1845		
	James W. Fox	1849		
	Andrew Jackson Freeman	1819		
	Henry William Fuller	June 30, 1839		
	Charles Frederick Gerry	1823		
	Onslow Gilmore	1832		
	William Segar Gleason	1809		
	Martin Thomas Glynn	1848		
	Frank Palmer Goulding	1837		
	James Benton Graham	1835		
	Franklin Gray	1824		
	Frank Shunk Gross	1836		
	Charles Hale	June 7, 1831		
	Andrew Hall	1833		
	Charles Hallett	1825		
	Patrick Henry Hallinan	1852		
	Leander Moody Hannum	1837		
	Henry Martin Hartshorn	1828		
	Thomas Jones Hastings	January 24, 1835		
	Frederick Hathaway	1810		
	Nathan Mortimer Hawkes	1843		
	George Frederic Hayden	1836		
	Milton Lewis Perry Heustis	1825		
	Samuel Richardson Heywood	1821		
	Clement Hugh Hill	1836		
	John Hillis	1847		
	Richard Holley	January 30, 1829		
	William Carey Howard	1841		
	Caleb Burroughs Huse	September 13, 1833		
	Charles Halstead Ingalls	1840		
	Edward John Jenkins	1854		
	George William Johnson	1827		
	Peter Rogers Johnson	1824		
	Joseph James Kelley	1842		
	Patrick Keyes	1830		
	Ensign Kimball	1818		
	William Bird Kimball	1833		
	William Hales Kinsman	1821		
	Hosea Morrill Knowlton	1847		
	Asa Stillman Lawrence	1820		
	Alfred Laws	1831		
	Henry Lee	1817		
	Chauncey Wheeler Lessey	1829		
	Thomas Lonergan	1827		
	John Davis Long	October 27, 1838		
	Benjamin Starks Lovell	1845		
	John Dana Lovell	1818		
	Francis Low	1824		
	Lewis Gold Lowe	1828		
	Hale Sisson Luther	1830		
	James Mackintosh	1838		
	Pardon Macomber	February 9, 1833		
	Hugh Ambrose Madden	1839		
	James Thomas Mahony	1843		
	Seth Mann	1817		
	William Marchant	1817		
	Isaac Burgess Martin	1825		
	Matthew James McCafferty	1829		
	George Brackett Melcher	1836		
	James Henry Mellen	1845		
	Francis Peabody Merriam	1818		
	Frederick Warren Merrill	1842		
	Simeon Merritt	1823		
	Alfred Miller	1815		
	William Haswell Montague	1824		
	Thomas Mooney	1840		
	Aaron Rathburn Morse	1839		
	Enoch Robinson Morse	1822		
	James Thomas Murphy	1842		
	Erastus Maltby Nash	1826		
	Dexter Newton	1823		
	James Hale Newton	1832		
	John Franklin Newton	1829		
	Nathaniel Avery Newton	1814		
	Charles Johnson Noyes	August 7, 1841		
	Dennis O'Connor	1838		
	Cornelius O'Sullivan	1825		
	Weaver Osborn	1815		
	Charles Stuart Osgood	1839		
	Henry Bryant Osgood	1818		
	Edwin Patch	1820		
	Alonzo Penney	September 23, 1835		
	Ephraim Augustus Perkins	1839		
	Baxter Edwards Perry	April 26, 1826		
	John Charles Perry	1839		
	William Cowper Peters	1827		
	Darius Pierce	1836		
	Henry Pierce	1826		
	Albert Enoch Pillsbury	August 19, 1849		
	Samuel Cloon Pitman	1811		
	Charles Greenwood Pope	1840		
	Charles Jones Prescott	1838		
	Dennis George Quirk	1836		
	Oliver James Rand	1820		
	David Randall	1818		
	Charles Everett Ranlett	1816		
	James Paine Ray	1820		
	William Arthur Read	1849		
	George Randall Reed	1832		
	Rice Munn Reynolds	1838		
	Charles Baker Rice	1829		
	Charles Warren Richards	1824		
	James Henry Richards	1839		
	Samuel Roads	1825		
	William Robinson	1835		
	John Austin Rogers	1828		
	Cyrus King Russell	1815		
	John Crockett Sanborn	1832		
	George Webster Sanderson	1830		
	Luther Haines Sargent	1842		
	Horace Mills Sessions	1828		
	Josephus Shaw	1832		
	Harrison Allen Sheldon	1830		
	Henry Shortle	1834		
	John Killbourne Clough Sleeper	1828		
	Solomon Sias Sleeper	1815		
	Dana Zenas Smith	1819		
	Iram Smith	1807		
	Peter Dove Smith	1842		
	Newell Snow	1816		
	Samuel Snow	1828		
	Mark Henry Spaulding	1827		
	Charles Stickney	1829		
	Eben Francis Stone	August 3, 1822		
	Ezekiel Reed Studley	1831		
	Charles B. Swain			
	Noah Swett	1826		
	Lewis Northey Tappan	June 15, 1831		
	Oliver Taylor	1826		
	Edward Flint Thayer	1835		
	Francis Nicholas Thayer	1846		
	Edward Isaiah Thomas	1833		
	Leonard Thompson	1817		
	Charles Frederick Thurston	1844		
	John Wilson Tilton	1844		
	Dexter Alley Tompkins	1827		
	William Ripley Tompkins	1826		
	Merritt Torrey	1825		
	William G. Train	1825		
	John Turner	1827		
	Augustus Sherman Tuttle	1824		
	Levi Clifford Wade	1843		
	Edwin Walden	November 25, 1818		
	Joseph Walker	1825		
	James Lawrence Walsh	1843		
	Alonzo Warren	1827		
	Emory Washburn	February 14, 1800		
	John Davis Washburn	1833		
	William Watts	1835		
	Lewis Taylor Webster	1832		
	Michael Francis Wells	1832		
	Samuel Hidden Wentworth			
	John Wilson Wheeler	1832		
	John Birtwistle Whitaker	1816		
	James White	1828		
	Sydney Franklin Whitehouse	1822		
	Charles Stimson Whitmore	1815		
	William Gunn Whitmore	1849		
	Edward Whitney	1815		
	William Ward Wilde	1821		
	Henry Hills Wilder	1824		
	George Andrew Wilson	1825		
	George Colburn Wilson	1809		
	Daniel Wing	1841		
	Henry Winn	1837		
	Thomas Winship	1826		
	Isaac Winslow	1827		
	Joseph Wiswell	1816		
	Henry Pickett Woodbury	1835		
	John Henry Wright	1843		

== See also ==
- 1877 Massachusetts gubernatorial election
- 45th United States Congress
- List of Massachusetts General Courts
