= Amos Howe Johnson =

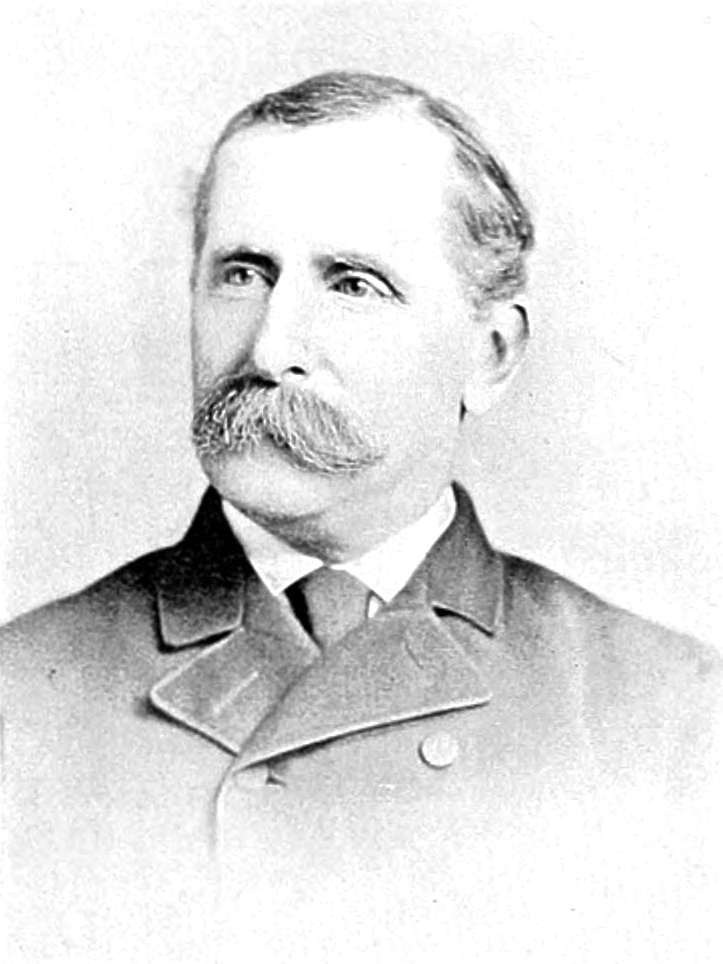

Member of the Massachusetts House of Representatives for the 24th Essex District
- In office 1862
- Preceded by: Harmon Hall
- Succeeded by: John Howlett

Personal details
- Born: August 4, 1831 Boston, Massachusetts, U.S.
- Died: May 12, 1896 (aged 64) Salem, Massachusetts
- Spouse: Frances Seymour Benjamin (m. 1859)
- Relations: George W. Johnson (brother); Edward C. Johnson II (grandson); Edward C. Johnson III (great-grandson); Abigail Johnson (great-great-granddaughter)
- Children: 6
- Education: Harvard College; Andover Theological Seminary; Harvard Medical School
- Occupation: Minister; Physician

Amos Howe Johnson (August 4, 1831 – May 12, 1896) was an American medical doctor and politician who was a member of the Massachusetts House of Representatives during the 1862 Massachusetts legislature.

== Early life ==
Johnson was born in Boston on August 4, 1831. He was one of seven children born to merchant Samuel Johnson and his wife, the former Charlotte Abigail Howe. One of his brothers, George W. Johnson, was a lawyer and state legislator. Johnson's earliest education came at the Chauncy Hall School. He was then sent to a boarding school in Quincy, Massachusetts, but ran away. He also ran away from his next school, the Brookfield Family School, but was sent back. He finished his preparatory education at Phillips Academy.

== Ministry and politics ==
Johnson graduated from Harvard College in 1853 and the Andover Theological Seminary in 1856. On January 1, 1857, he became the pastor of the Congregational Church in Middleton, Massachusetts. Throat issues and persistent headaches caused Johnson to resign from his pastorate in 1861. In 1862, he represented the 24th Essex District, comprising the towns of Middleton, Saugus, and Lynnfield, in the Massachusetts House of Representatives. From 1873 to 1875, he was a member of the Salem, Massachusetts school committee.

== Medicine ==
In 1862, Johnson entered Harvard Medical School. He graduated in 1865 and set up a practice in Salem. From 1869 and 1870, he furthered his studies in Berlin and Vienna. He spent many years on the staff of Salem Hospital and was a member of the consulting board of physicians of the Danvers State Hospital. From 1890 to 1892, he was president of the Massachusetts Medical Society.

== Personal life and death ==
On September 22, 1859, Johnson married Frances Seymour Benjamin, daughter of Nathan and Mary A. (Wheeler) Benjamin. Benjamin's parents were American missionaries in Greece. One of her brothers was Samuel Greene Wheeler Benjamin. The Johnsons had six children:

- Samuel Johnson (1860–1932), partner in C.F. Hovey and Co. Father of Fidelity Investments founder Edward C. Johnson II.
- Meta Benjamin (Johnson) Bergen (1862–1939)
- Amy Howe Johnson (1865–1949)
- Charles Alfred Johnson (1868–1954), real estate and rental broker. Officer in the Colorado National Guard.
- Philip Seymour Johnson (1872–1910), salesman with Sargent & Fairfield
- Ralph Seymour Johnson (1878–1898), member of Torrey's Rough Riders. Killed during the Spanish–American War.

One of his nieces, Charlotte Howe Johnson, was married to Governor of Massachusetts Curtis Guild Jr., and was First Lady of Massachusetts from 1906 to 1909. He was the brother-in-law of Austin Phelps, who was married to his sister, Mary.

Johnson died of stomach cancer on May 12, 1896.
