= 1879 Massachusetts gubernatorial election =

- November 4, 1879
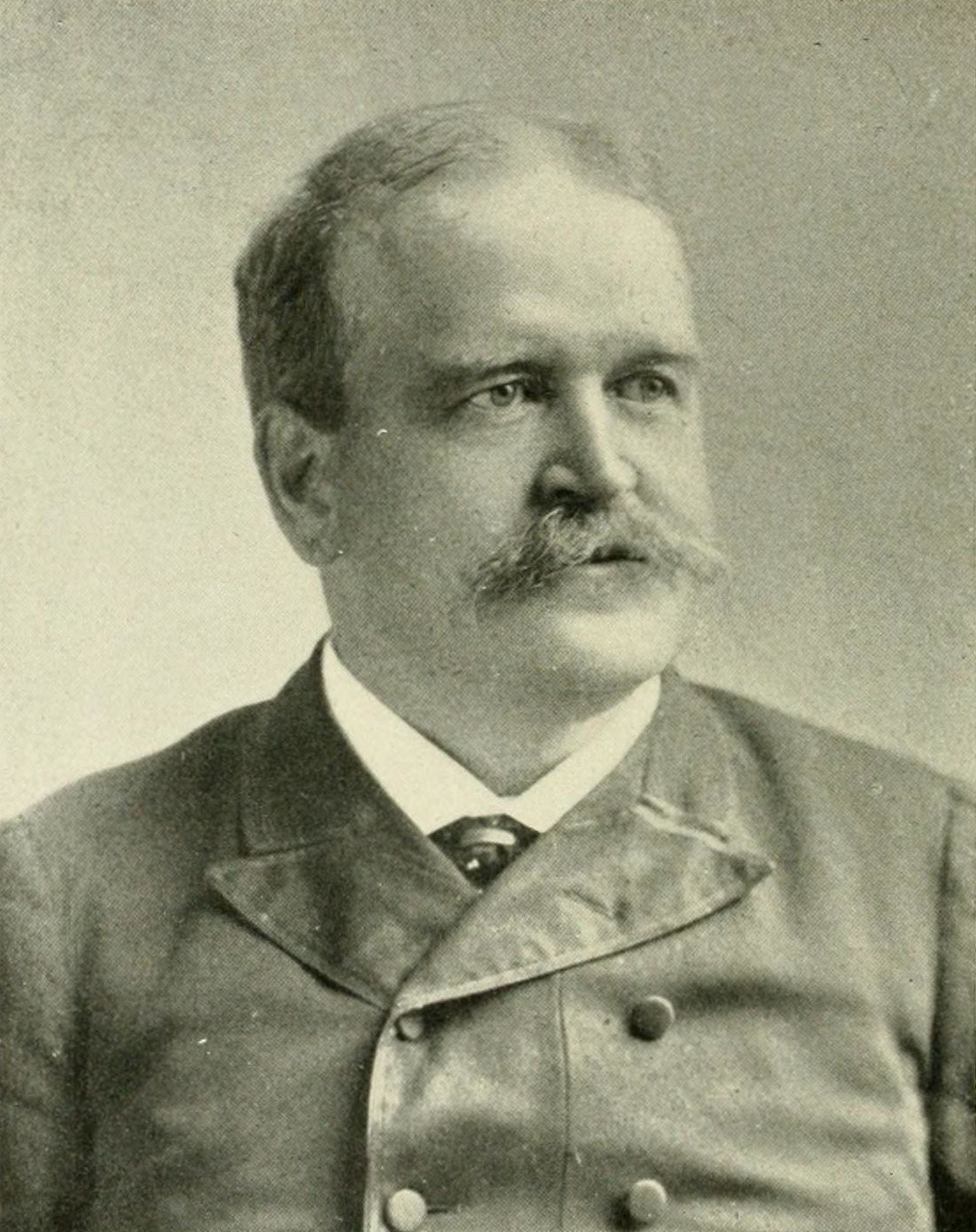

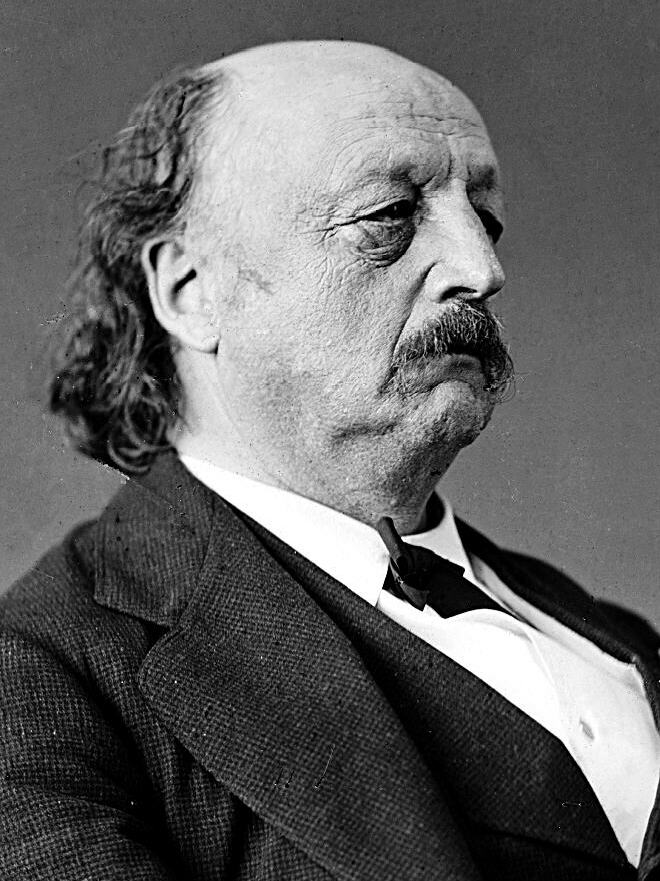
Nominee	John Davis Long	Benjamin Butler
Party	Republican	Democratic
Alliance		Greenback
Popular vote	122,751	109,149
Percentage	50.38%	44.80%
- Long: 40-50% 50–60% 60–70% 70–80% 80–90% >90% Butler: 40-50% 50–60% 60–70% Adams: 40-50% Tie: 40-50%
Governor before election
Thomas Talbot
Republican
Elected Governor
John Davis Long
Republican

The 1879 Massachusetts gubernatorial election was held on November 4. Incumbent governor Thomas Talbot did not seek re-election to a second term in office; he was succeeded by lieutenant governor John Davis Long, who defeated Henry L. Pierce for the Republican nomination and Benjamin Butler in the general election.

== Republican nomination ==
=== Candidates ===
- John Davis Long, lieutenant governor of Massachusetts
- Henry L. Pierce, former mayor of Boston and U.S. representative

==== Declined ====
- Thomas Talbot, incumbent governor since 1879 (withdrew from consideration August 20)

=== Campaign ===
On June 20, Governor Talbot announced that he wished to retire at the end of his term and would decline the Republican nomination if offered. He formally withdrew on August 20.

Following Talbot's withdrawal, the field was divided between lieutenant governor John Davis Long and former Boston mayor Henry L. Pierce, with Pierce stronger in the cities.

Long's supporters felt he was guaranteed the nomination by an existing implicit agreement, having stepped aside for Talbot in 1878. However, this agreement quickly made way for the necessity of defeating Benjamin Butler, whom Republicans decried as a demagogue and communist. Supporters of Henry L. Pierce entered his name into consideration soon after Talbot's withdrawal in hopes that Long supporters would again concede to a stronger candidate, but they did not. Long and Pierce agreed on many issues, so the electability issue decided the campaign. Pierce's supporters argued that he would better appeal to liberals, independents, and Democrats, while Long had to rely on Stalwarts and prohibitionists. Though Long conceded to be as liberal as Pierce, Pierce supporters argued that his brief public record was insufficient to appeal to swing constituencies.

=== Convention ===
1879 Massachusetts Republican Convention
Party	Candidate	Votes	%
Republican	John Davis Long	669	56.9%
Republican	Henry L. Pierce	505	43.0%
Republican	Charles Devens	1	0.1%
Total votes		1,175	100%

Long formally accepted the nomination at a ratification meeting on September 26. Pierce sent a letter endorsing Long.

== General election ==
=== Results ===
- John Quincy Adams II, former state representative from Quincy and nominee for governor (1867–71) (Democratic)
- Benjamin Butler, former U.S. representative from Lowell (Greenback and Democratic)
- D.C. Eddy (Prohibition)
- John Davis Long, lieutenant governor of Massachusetts (Republican)

1879 Massachusetts gubernatorial election
Party	Candidate	Votes	%	±%
Republican	John Davis Long	122,751	50.38%	
Democratic	Benjamin Butler	109,149	44.80%	
Independent Democrat	John Quincy Adams II	9,989	4.10%	
Prohibition	D.C. Eddy	1,645	0.68%	
Others	Others	108	0.00%	
Republican hold		Swing		

== See also ==
- 1879 Massachusetts legislature
