= 1881 Massachusetts legislature =

102nd Massachusetts General Court
| ← | 101st | 103rd | → |

Overview
- Legislative body: General Court
- Election: November 2, 1880

Senate
- Members: 40
- President: Robert R. Bishop
- Party control: Republican

House
- Members: 240
- Speaker: Charles J. Noyes
- Party control: Republican

Sessions
- 1st: January 5, 1881 – May 13, 1881 + extra session

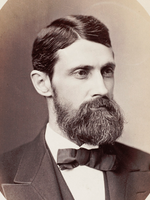
Robert Bishop, Senate president.

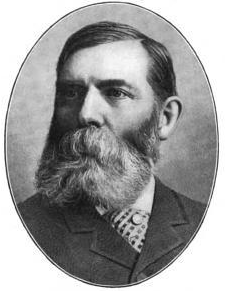
Charles Noyes, House speaker.

Leaders of the Massachusetts General Court, 1881.

The 102nd Massachusetts General Court, consisting of the Massachusetts Senate and the Massachusetts House of Representatives, met in 1881 during the governorship of John Davis Long. Robert R. Bishop served as president of the Senate and Charles J. Noyes served as speaker of the House of Representatives.

== Senators ==
- William Abbott
- Charles H. Allen
- Oliver Ames
- Joseph Bennett
- Robert R. Bishop
- Elisha S. Converse
- Samuel M. Cook
- Chester C. Corbin
- George G. Crocker
- Anson D. Fessenden
- Ebenezer T. Fogg
- Henry W. Fuller
- Emerson Gaylord
- Harmon Hall
- Leander M. Hannum
- Thomas J. Hastings
- Nathaniel A. Horton
- Daniel B. Ingalls
- Marcus P. Knowlton
- Charles S. Lilley
- John B. Martin
- John M. Moore
- Francis Norwood
- James L. Quigley
- James P. Ray
- Milton Reed
- Charles B. Rice
- George B. Richmond
- Francis W. Rockwell
- Joseph N. Rolfe
- Joseph H. Root
- Elizur Smith
- James Smith
- Samuel Snow
- Charles Q. Tirrell
- David W. Tucker
- William Van Nostrand
- Starkes Whiton
- John A. Wiley
- Thomas Winship

== See also ==
- 1881 Massachusetts gubernatorial election
- 47th United States Congress
- List of Massachusetts General Courts
