= Eli Culley =

American politician (1840–1890)

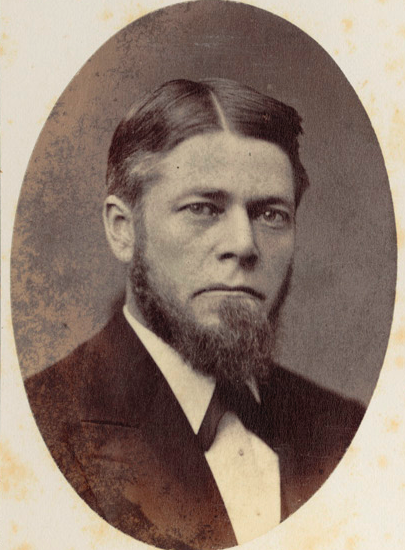
- Culley as a member of the Massachusetts House of Representatives

Mayor of Fitchburg, Massachusetts
- In office 1888–1890
- Preceded by: Frederick Fosdick
- Succeeded by: Charles S. Hayden
- In office 1880–1882
- Preceded by: William H. Vose
- Succeeded by: George Robbins

Member of the Massachusetts House of Representatives from the 6th Worcester District
- In office 1880

Personal details
- Born: February 4, 1840 Bath, Somerset, U.K.
- Died: April 21, 1890 (aged 50) Fitchburg, Massachusetts, U.S.

Eli Culley (February 4, 1840 – April 21, 1890) was an English-born American politician who was a member of the Massachusetts House of Representatives in 1880 and mayor of Fitchburg, Massachusetts from 1880 to 1882 and again from 1888 to 1890.

== Early life ==
Culley was born in Bath, Somerset on February 4, 1840. He immigrated to the United States at the age of fifteen and worked in a file factory in Lowell, Massachusetts. On October 5, 1862, he married Martha Redman. They had six children. He served with the 43rd Massachusetts Infantry Regiment during the American Civil War. He was discharged in the fall of 1863, but was unable to immediately return to work due to malaria he contracted during his military service.

== Business ==
In 1864, Culley began a file manufacturing business in Weymouth, Massachusetts. Four years later, moved his business to Fitchburg and manufactured files on a more extensive scale.

== Politics ==
Culley was president of the Fitchburg common council in 1875 and a member of the board of aldermen from 1877 to 1878. He represented the Sixth Worcester district in the Massachusetts House of Representatives in the 1880 Massachusetts legislature. He served as mayor of Fitchburg from 1880 to 1882. He returned to office in 1888 by defeating incumbent Frederick Fosdick by 350 votes. He was reelected in 1888, which made him the first person to serve four terms as Fitchburg's mayor. He did not run for reelection in 1889.

== Death ==
Culley went missing on April 21, 1890. His body was found the next day in the Overlook Reservoir. According to The Boston Globe, he had been ill with an "affection of the brain", and his death was believed to be a suicide.
