= Charles A. Corser =

Charles Azrae Corser
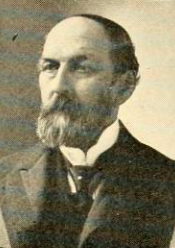
- Charles Azrae Corser, circa 1901

Member of the Massachusetts House of Representatives from the 2nd Hampden district

Personal details
- Born: September 21, 1832 Lyndon, Vermont, U.S.
- Died: October 31, 1909 (aged 77) Holyoke, Massachusetts, U.S.
- Party: Republican

Charles Azrae Corser (September 21, 1832 – October 31, 1909) was an American real estate businessman and state legislator in Massachusetts. He lived in Holyoke, and served as an alderman there.

== Biography ==
Corser was born September 21, 1832 in Lyndon, Vermont. When he was 8 years old, he moved to Woonsocket, Rhode Island with his family, and attended school there.

In 1848, he moved to Mendon, Massachusetts, where he stayed for eight years in order to learn shoemaking. He later moved to Chester, Vermont and Charlestown, New Hampshire, before finally moving to Holyoke, Massachusetts in 1864, where he began selling shoes. He would later go on to become a real estate businessman in 1890.

He served as a selectman in Holyoke from 1869 to 1870, and as an alderman there from 1872 to 1873. He was elected to the Massachusetts General Court three times, each for a one-year term - once to the House of Representatives in 1871, representing the 6th Hampden district, and twice to the Senate in 1881 and 1901, representing the 2nd Hampden district.

Corser was involved in a car accident on July 17, 1909, which greatly impacted his health. He died on October 31, 1909, at the age of 77. The cause of death was given as cirrhosis.

== Family ==
He had a son Charles Benjamin Corser. A genealogy of the Corser family was published in 1902.

== See also ==
- 1871 Massachusetts legislature
- 1882 Massachusetts legislature
- 1901 Massachusetts legislature
