= J. Allston Newhall =

American businessman and politician

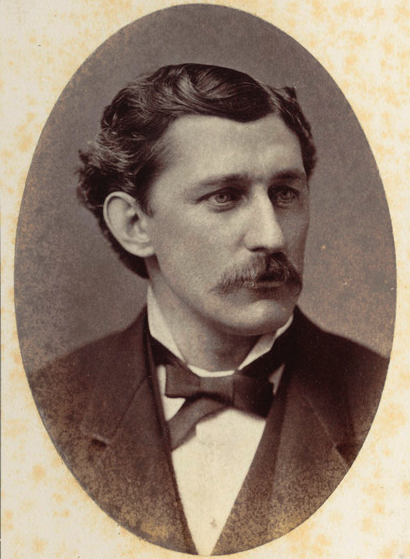

Member of the Massachusetts House of Representatives for the 13th Essex District
- In office 1880–1880
- Preceded by: Dudley Bradstreet
- Succeeded by: Andrew Mansfield

Personal details
- Born: May 29, 1847 Saugus, Massachusetts
- Died: March 15, 1907 (aged 59) Saugus, Massachusetts

Joseph Allston Newhall (May 29, 1847 – March 15, 1907) was an American businessman and politician.

== Early life ==
Newhall was born on May 29, 1847, in Saugus, Massachusetts to J. Stocker and Emeline A. (Ware) Newhall. He attended Saugus Public Schools and the Chauncy Hall School in Boston. In 1873 he married Amelia B. Westermann.

== Politics ==
Newhall was a member of the Saugus board of selectmen from 1878 to 1880. In 1880 he represented the 13th Essex district in the Massachusetts House of Representatives.

== Military ==
Newhall served in the First Corps of Cadets from 1878 to 1882. From June 16, 1887, to December 23, 1890, he was a first lieutenant in the First Battalion of the Ancient and Honorable Artillery Company of Massachusetts.

== Business career ==
Newhall engaged in Morocco leather manufacturing. He also served as president of the Commonwealth Mutual Fire Insurance Company, which was formed in 1894 to provide mercantile insurance throughout the United States. The company went into receivership the following year. The J. Alston Newhall Company was dissolved in 1904 and Newhall died on March 15, 1907, in Saugus.
