= 1882 Massachusetts gubernatorial election =

- November 7, 1882
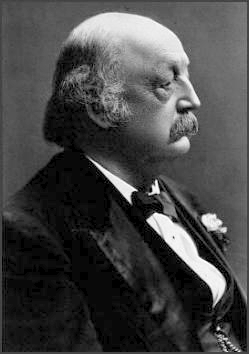

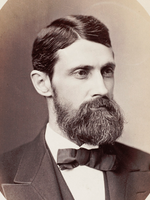
Nominee	Benjamin Franklin Butler	Robert R. Bishop
Party	Democratic	Republican
Alliance	Greenback
Popular vote	133,946	119,947
Percentage	52.27%	46.82%
- Butler: 40–50% 50–60% 60–70% Bishop: 40–50% 50–60% 60–70% 70–80% 80–90% >90% Tie: 40–50% 50%
Governor before election
John Davis Long
Republican
Elected Governor
Benjamin Franklin Butler
Democratic

The 1882 Massachusetts gubernatorial election was held on November 7.

Civil War Major and former Congressman Benjamin Butler ran on a fusion ticket between the Democratic Party and the Greenback Labor Party.

== Republican nomination ==
=== Candidates ===
- Robert R. Bishop, president of the Massachusetts Senate
- William W. Crapo, U.S. representative from New Bedford

==== Declined ====
- William W. Rice, U.S. representative from Worcester

=== Results ===
1882 Massachusetts Republican convention
Party	Candidate	Votes	%
Republican	Robert R. Bishop	673	52.41%
Republican	William W. Crapo	564	43.93%
Republican	Scattering	47	3.66
Total votes		1,284	100.00%

== General election ==
=== Results ===
Massachusetts gubernatorial election, 1882
Party	Candidate	Votes	%	±%
Democratic	Benjamin Franklin Butler	133,946	52.27%	
Republican	Robert R. Bishop	119,997	46.82%	
Prohibition	Charles Almy	2,137	0.83%	
Others	Others	198	0.08%	
Democratic gain from Republican		Swing		

=== Lt. governor ===
Massachusetts lt. gubernatorial election, 1882
Party	Candidate	Votes	%	±%
Republican	Oliver Ames	134,353	52.22%	
Democratic	Samuel W. Bowerman	116,647	45.34%	
Greenback	George Dutton	4,033	1.57%	
Prohibition	John Blackmer	2,141	0.83%	
Others	Others	87	0.03%	
Republican hold		Swing		

== See also ==
- 1882 Massachusetts legislature
