= John Howlett (miller) =

American tobacco manufacturer and politician

Member of the Massachusetts House of Representatives for the 24th Essex District
- In office 1863–1863
- Preceded by: Amos Howe Johnson
- Succeeded by: Charles W. Newhall

Personal details
- Born: October 15, 1810 Boston
- Died: 1877 (aged 66 or 67) Saugus, Massachusetts
- Resting place: Riverside Cemetery; Saugus, Massachusetts
- Spouse: Hannah Peters (1838-1856; her death)
- Occupation: Snuff and cigar manufacturer

John Howlet (1810–1877) was an American tobacco manufacturer and politician who served one term in the Massachusetts House of Representatives.

Howlett was born on October 15, 1810, in Boston. His father, James Howlett, was the owner of a snuff mill in Saugus, Massachusetts. In 1838, he married Hannah Peters of Andover, Massachusetts. They had six children.

After his father died, Howlett bought out the other heirs to become the sole owner of the snuff mill. In 1863 he represented the 24th Essex District in the Massachusetts House of Representatives. He continued the tobacco business until the late 1860s, when he converted the property into a saw mill. In 1871 he sold the mill to Philip P. Hone. He died in 1877.
