= George Winter Park =

American politician

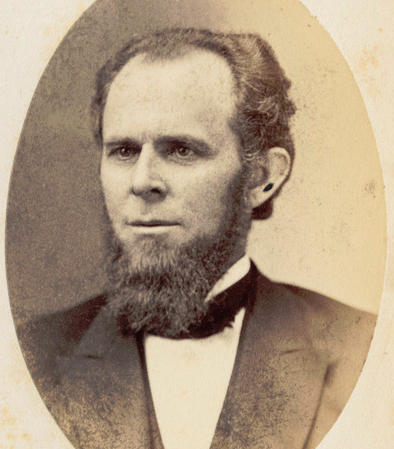

Member of the Massachusetts House of Representatives

Member of the Board of Aldermen Cambridge, Massachusetts
- In office 1869–1870

Personal details
- Born: 1834
- Died: 1901 (aged 66–67)

George Winter Park (1834–1901) was an American politician who served as a member of the Cambridge, Massachusetts Board of Aldermen, in 1869 and 1870 and in the Massachusetts House of Representatives.
