= Joseph Whitehead (Massachusetts politician) =

American shoe manufacturer and politician

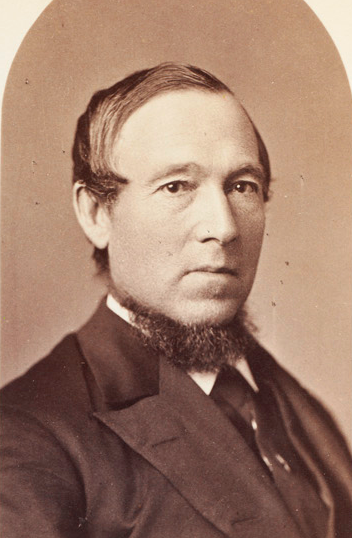

Member of the Massachusetts House of Representatives for the 13th Essex District
- In office 1878–1878
- Preceded by: Francis E. Batchelder
- Succeeded by: Dudley Bradstreet

Personal details
- Born: May 20, 1823 Yorkshire
- Died: November 18, 1912 (aged 89) Charlton, Massachusetts
- Party: Democratic
- Spouse: Sarah M. Townsend (1849–1867; her death)
- Occupation: Grocer

Joseph Whitehead (May 20, 1823 – November 18, 1912) was an English-American grocer and politician who served one term in the Massachusetts House of Representatives.

== Personal life ==
Whitehead was born on May 20, 1823, in Yorkshire. He immigrated to the United States in 1845. He resided in California and Milton, New Hampshire, before moving to Saugus, Massachusetts, in 1847. In 1849 he married Sarah M. Townsend, an English-born woman residing in Saugus. They had 5 children, 4 of whom died during infancy. Sarah Whitehead died on February 28, 1867.

== Business career ==
After moving to Saugus, Whitehead worked as a spinner. In 1858 he purchased Saugus' First Parish Church, moved it three rods north from its original location in the Saugus Center rotary, and opened a grocery store. In 1886 he was an incorporator of the Saugus Water Company, which was created to provide the town with water for home use and extinguishing fires. He also owned an automobile garage near the Saugus Center railroad station.

== Politics ==
Whitehead served as Saugus' town treasurer for many years and was also an overseer of the poor and bondsman to the defaulting collector. In 1877, he defeated fellow Saugonian Augustus B. Davis by fourteen votes to represent the 13th Essex District in the Massachusetts House of Representatives. Whitehead, a member of the Democratic Party, was able to win in a traditionally district that Republican Alexander H. Rice won by 118 votes in that year's gubernatorial election. In a letter to the editor of The Boston Globe, George M. Amerige of Saugus blamed Davis' defeat on Whitehead supporters who spread the false rumor that Davis was an alcoholic in the towns where the candidates were not well known.

== Death ==
Whitehead died on November 18, 1912, at the Masonic Home in Charlton, Massachusetts, at the age of 89. At the time of his death he was Saugus' oldest resident.
