= Charles J. Noyes =

American politician

Charles Johnson Noyes
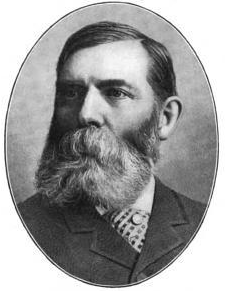

Judge of the Boston Municipal Court
- In office 1882–1905
- Appointed by: John D. Long

Speaker of the Massachusetts House of Representatives
- In office 1887–1888
- Preceded by: John Q. A. Brackett
- Succeeded by: William Emerson Barrett

Speaker of the Massachusetts House of Representatives
- In office 1880–1882
- Preceded by: Levi C. Wade
- Succeeded by: George A. Marden

Member of the Massachusetts House of Representatives 14th Suffolk District
- In office 1887–1888

Member of the Massachusetts House of Representatives 14th Suffolk District
- In office 1877–1882

Member of the Massachusetts Senate 3rd Essex District

Member of the Massachusetts House of Representatives
- In office 1866–1867

Personal details
- Born: August 7, 1841 Haverhill, Massachusetts, U.S.
- Died: October 16, 1910 (aged 69) Los Angeles, California, U.S.
- Resting place: Rosedale Cemetery
- Party: Republican
- Education: Union College, 1864
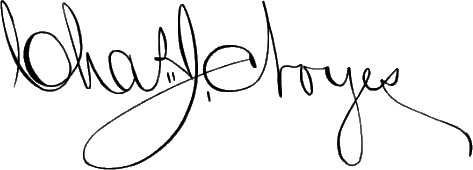
- Signature

Charles Johnson Noyes (August 7, 1841 – October 16, 1910) was a lawyer and politician who served as the Speaker of the Massachusetts House of Representatives from 1880 to 1882 and from 1887 to 1888.

Noyes was born in Haverhill, Massachusetts, on August 7, 1841. In 1864 Noyes graduated from Union College in Schenectady, New York.

In 1865 Noyes was elected to the Massachusetts House of Representatives for the 1866 session. In 1866 Noyes was elected to the Massachusetts Senate from the Third Essex District.

In 1876 Noyes was elected to the Massachusetts House of Representatives from the Fourteenth Suffolk District for the 1877 session.

Noyes moved to Los Angeles, California on December 20, 1905. Noyes was admitted to the bar of the California Court of Appeals on October 8. 1906.

== Death and burial ==
Noyes died on October 16, 1910, at Sisters Hospital in Los Angeles, California, from injuries he sustained in an accident. Noyes was buried in Rosedale Cemetery in Los Angeles, California.

== See also ==
- 1867 Massachusetts legislature
- 1877 Massachusetts legislature
- 1880 Massachusetts legislature
- 1881 Massachusetts legislature
- 1888 Massachusetts legislature

== Notes ==
Massachusetts House of Representatives
Preceded by Levi C. Wade	Speaker of the Massachusetts House of Representatives; 1880 — 1882	Succeeded by George A. Marden
Preceded by John Q. A. Brackett	Speaker of the Massachusetts House of Representatives; 1887 — 1888	Succeeded by William Emerson Barrett
