= Charles Bunker Swain =

American politician

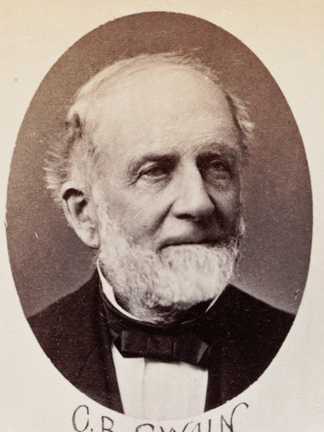

Member of the Massachusetts House of Representatives Nantucket District
- In office 1877–1877
- Preceded by: Joseph Mitchell, 2d.
- Succeeded by: Henry Paddack

Personal details
- Born: Nantucket, Massachusetts

Charles Bunker Swain was an American politician who served as a member of the Massachusetts House of Representatives in 1877.
