= Henry Paddack =

American politician

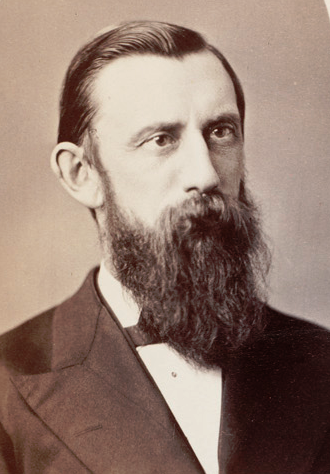

Treasurer of the Town and County of Nantucket, Massachusetts
- In office 1892–1903
- Preceded by: Samuel Swain

Member of the Massachusetts House of Representatives Nantucket District
- In office 1878–1881
- Preceded by: Charles Bunker Swain
- Succeeded by: Josiah Freeman

Member of the Board of Selectmen of the Town of Nantucket, Massachusetts

Personal details
- Born: April 2, 1838 Nantucket, Massachusetts
- Died: 1920 (aged 81–82)
- Party: Republican
- Spouse: Sarah Jane Whippey.
- Occupation: House and Ship painter, paint supply store operator, bank president.

Henry Paddack (April 2, 1838 – 1920) was an American businessman and politician who served as the Treasurer; a member of the Board of Selectmen of Nantucket, Massachusetts and as a member of the Massachusetts House of Representatives.

== Early life and education ==
Paddack was born to Alexander Coleman and Eunice (Hussey) Paddack on Nantucket, Massachusetts on April 2, 1838 Paddack was educated in the public schools of Nantucket, and Nantucket High School.

== Business career ==
Henry Paddack ran a paint supply store at 12 Main Street, Nantucket, Massachusetts.

== Political offices ==
From 1878 to 1881 Paddack was a member of the Massachusetts House of Representatives. In 1892 Paddack was elected the Treasurer of the Town and County of Nantucket, Massachusetts he served as treasurer for eleven consecutive years, Paddack also served as a member of the Nantucket Board of Selectmen for ten years.

== Family life ==
On July 21, 1861 Paddack married Sarah Jane Whippey. They had one child, Arthur Paddack, born on August 19, 1863.

== See also ==
- 1878 Massachusetts legislature
