= George W. Johnson (Massachusetts politician) =

America politician (1827–1909)

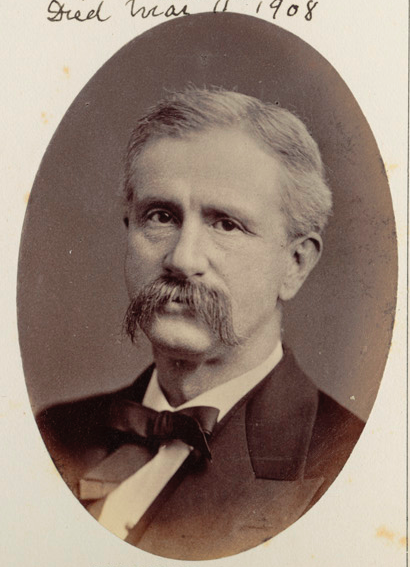

Member of the Massachusetts Governor's Council for the 7th District
- In office 1887–1889
- Preceded by: Henry C. Greeley
- Succeeded by: William Abbott

Member of the Massachusetts House of Representatives for the 12th Worcester District
- In office 1880 Serving with George N. Bacon
- Preceded by: Theodore C. Bates/Joseph Smith
- Succeeded by: George A. Parrat/George M. Newton
- In office 1877 Serving with William H. Montague
- Preceded by: John F. Searle
- Succeeded by: George C. Lincoln/Alvin B. Chamberlain

Member of the Massachusetts Senate for the Third Worcester District
- In office 1870
- Preceded by: Lucius Knowles
- Succeeded by: A. J. Bartholomew

Personal details
- Born: December 27, 1827 Boston, Massachusetts, U.S.
- Died: April 12, 1909 (aged 81) Brookfield, Massachusetts
- Spouse: Mary Ellen Stowell (m. 1857)
- Relations: Amos Howe Johnson (brother)
- Children: 7
- Occupation: Businessman; Lawyer

George William Johnson (December 27, 1827 – April 12, 1909) was an American businessman, attorney, and politician who served in both branches of the Massachusetts state legislature and the Massachusetts Governor's Council.

== Early life ==
Johnson was born in Boston on December 27, 1827. He was one of seven children born to merchant Samuel Johnson and his wife, the former Charlotte Abigail Howe. One of his brothers, Amos Howe Johnson, was a noted physician who also served in the state legislature. He was educated at the Chauncy Hall School and Boston Latin School.

== Business and legal career ==
At the age of seventeen, Johnson began working for Deane & Davis, an import and wholesale business. He later became a partner in the firm, which was renamed Deane, Davis, & Company, and later Davis, Johnson, & Company. The firm was dissolved in 1850. He spent much of the next five years traveling the world for business and pleasure.

On February 24, 1857, Johnson married Mary Ellen Stowell of Chicago. They chose to make their home in Brookfield, Massachusetts, which was the hometown of Johnson's maternal ancestors. In 1860, he began studying law in the office of J. Evarts Greene. He then studied under Peleg Chandler and George O. Shattuck in Boston. He was admitted to the bar on April 10, 1863. He opened a law office in Brookfield. He also negotiated loans on Chicago real estate for buyers from the Eastern United States. His absences from Brookfield led him to close his law office in 1868 to focus on his financial work. In 1870, he and Levi Davis started a shoe manufacturing business in Brookfield. The firm was known as Johnson & Davis until 1872, when it became Johnson, Davis, & Forbes. The factory was destroyed by fire in 1878 and the firm was dissolved. Afterwards, Johnson resumed his law practice and loan business.

== Politics ==
Johnson served on Brookfield's school committee and board of selectmen. He was a delegate to the 1868 Republican National Convention and an alternate delegate to the 1880 Republican National Convention.

In 1870, Johnson represented the 3rd Worcester district in the Massachusetts Senate. He opposed providing a state grant to the struggling Boston, Hartford and Erie Railroad. In 1877 and 1880, he was a member of the Massachusetts House of Representatives. He was a member of the committee on finance both terms and was the house chairman of the committee on fisheries during his second term. From 1877 to 1879, Johnson was an inspector of the state almshouse in Monson, Massachusetts. From 1879 to 1887, he was a trustee of the state primary and reform schools. From 1887 to 1889, he was a member of the Massachusetts Governor's Council. He served on the committee on pardons and on the special committee overseeing the purchase of land and making estimates and plans for the expansion of the Massachusetts State House. In 1889, Johnson was a candidate for Lieutenant Governor of Massachusetts, but lost the Republican nomination to William H. Haile. Johnson was appointed to the state board of lunacy and charity in 1889 and became its chairman in 1892. He retired in 1903 and was succeeded by Joseph Walker.

== Personal life and death ==
George and Mary Johnson had seven children:

- Clara Stowell (Johnson) Thompson (1860–1928)
- Mary Abbott Johnson (1862–1864)
- George Haven Johnson (1864–1903), worked in the lumber business in Arkansas, Mississippi. Died of Typhoid fever in Columbia, Mississippi
- Alice Robbins (Johnson) Clark (1867–1942)
- Ethel Johnson (1869–1956)
- Harold Abbott Johnson (1873–1931), was surgeon at Massachusetts General Hospital and Lakeside Hospital before opening a practice in Lynn, Massachusetts
- Marion Phillips Johnson (1875–1879)

One of his nieces, Charlotte Howe Johnson, was married to Governor of Massachusetts Curtis Guild Jr., and was First Lady of Massachusetts from 1906 to 1909. He was the brother-in-law of Austin Phelps, who was married to his sister, Mary.

Johnson died on April 12, 1909, at his home in Brookfield. He had been in poor health since suffering a shock two years prior.
