= Robert R. Bishop =

American politician (1834–1910)

Robert Roberts Bishop
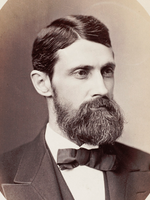

Associate Justice of the Massachusetts Superior Court
- In office March 7, 1888 – October 7, 1910

President of the Massachusetts Senate
- In office 1880–1882
- Preceded by: John B. D. Cogswell
- Succeeded by: George Glover Crocker

Member of the Massachusetts Senate
- In office 1878–1882

Member of the Massachusetts House of Representatives
- In office 1874–1874

Personal details
- Born: March 13, 1834 Medfield, Massachusetts, U.S.
- Died: October 7, 1910 (aged 76) Newton Center, Massachusetts, U.S.
- Party: Republican
- Spouse(s): Mary Helen Bullard, m. December 23, 1857
- Children: Robert Roberts Bishop, Jr.; Elias Bullard Bishop; Joseph Torrey Bishop
- Education: Phillips Academy, Harvard Law School, 1857

Robert Roberts Bishop (March 13, 1834 – October 7, 1910) was a Massachusetts lawyer and politician who served in the Massachusetts House of Representatives, as a member, and President of, the Massachusetts Senate and as an associate justice of the Massachusetts Superior Court. Bishop was also the unsuccessful Republican Party nominee in the 1882 election for governor of Massachusetts.

== See also ==
- 1874 Massachusetts legislature
- 1878 Massachusetts legislature
- 1880 Massachusetts legislature
- 1881 Massachusetts legislature

Political offices
Preceded by John B. D. Cogswell	President of the Massachusetts Senate; 1880–1882	Succeeded by George Glover Crocker
Party political offices
Preceded by John Davis Long	Massachusetts Republican Gubernatorial nominee 1882	Succeeded by George D. Robinson
