= Alpheus Harding =

American politician

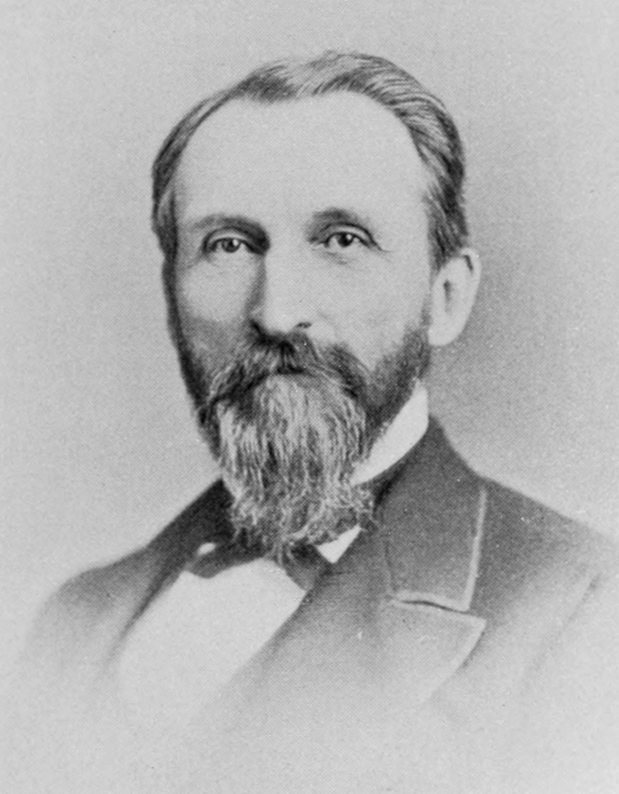

Member of the Massachusetts Senate
- In office 1879–1880

Member of the Massachusetts House of Representatives
- In office 1867
- Constituency: Royalston
- In office 1863
- Constituency: Athol
- In office 1851–1853
- Constituency: New Salem

Personal details
- Born: January 12, 1818 New Salem, Massachusetts
- Died: October 13, 1903 (aged 85) Boston, Massachusetts
- Party: Republican; Free Soil
- Spouse: Maria P. Taft (m. 1842)
- Occupation: Banker, politician

Alpheus Harding Jr. (January 12, 1818 – October 13, 1903) was an American politician and bank president. He was a member of the Massachusetts House of Representatives and the Massachusetts Senate.

== Early years ==
Harding was born in New Salem, Massachusetts in 1818. He was the son of Rev. Alpheus and Sarah Bridge Harding. His father was a minister in New Salem for more than 40 years. Harding attended the academy at New Salem, and entered Amherst College in 1833, leaving the next year, because of sickness.

== Career ==
In 1835, he worked as a store clerk and continued to work in the mercantile industry for 21 years in Worcester and Franklin counties until 1856. During this time, he served as postmaster of New Salem for 10 years, and town clerk and treasurer for about another 10 years. He was also at various times the chairman of the boards of selectmen, assessors and overseers of the poor.

He was a member of the House of Representatives from New Salem in 1851-52. He again represented New Salem in the Legislature of 1853. Since 1856, he was a member of the Board of Trustees of New Salem Academy. In the same year, he was appointed cashier of the Miller's River Bank of Athol. When the name changed to be the Miller's River National Bank, Harding was made president, an office he held for 26 years. In 1863 and 1867, he represented the towns of Athol and Royalston in the State Legislature. While a member of the House, in 1867, he obtained a charter for the Athol Savings Bank, becoming its treasurer until January 1892, when he became president. In 1879 and 1880, Harding was a Massachusetts State Senator. In 1880, he was a delegate to the National Republican Convention. He assisted in the formation of the Free Soil Party, but subsequently became a Republican.

== Personal life ==
He was married on September 6, 1842 to Maria P. Taft, of Dudley, Massachusetts. Their children included: Ella and William.

Alpheus Harding died at his home in Boston on October 13, 1903.

== See also ==
- 101st Massachusetts General Court (1880)
