= Harmon Hall =

American shoe manufacturer and politician

Member of the Massachusetts Senate for the First Essex District
- In office 1880–1881
- Preceded by: Nathan M. Hawkes
- Succeeded by: John R. Baldwin
- In office 1876–1876
- Preceded by: Thomas Ingalls
- Succeeded by: Amos F. Breed

Member of the Massachusetts Governor's Council for the 5th District
- In office 1878–1879
- Preceded by: William Cogswell
- Succeeded by: John M. Raymond

Member of the Massachusetts House of Representatives for the 24th Essex District
- In office 1861–1861
- Preceded by: John Danforth Jr.
- Succeeded by: Amos Howe Johnson

Saugus Town Clerk
- In office 1848–1852
- Preceded by: Benjamin F. Newhall
- Succeeded by: William H. Newhall

Personal details
- Born: July 22, 1818 Portland, Maine
- Died: June 30, 1891 (aged 73) Saugus, Massachusetts
- Resting place: Riverside Cemetery; Saugus, Massachusetts
- Party: Republican
- Spouse: Lucinda Atherton (m. 1851)
- Occupation: Shoe manufacturer

Harmon Hall (July 22, 1818 – June 30, 1891) was an American shoe manufacturer and politician who served in the Massachusetts General Court and on the Massachusetts Governor's Council.

== Early life ==
Hall was born on July 22, 1818, in Portland, Maine. When he was five his family moved to East Saugus, Massachusetts. He was educated in the Saugus Public Schools as well as the Lynn and New Market academies. On July 2, 1851, he married Lucinda Atherton, a native of Goffstown, New Hampshire who came to Saugus as a child when she was adopted by relative Jacob Newhall following her mother's death. They had two children, Harmon and Susie. The family resided on an estate on Chestnut Street in East Saugus.

== Politics ==
Hall held numerous offices in Saugus, including town clerk, selectman, and town moderator. In 1861 he represented the 24th Essex District in the Massachusetts House of Representatives. That same year, Governor John Albion Andrew appointed Hall to the position of state prison inspector. In 1868 he was made a trustee of the State Reform School for Boys by Governor Alexander Bullock. He was reappointed by Governor William Claflin and served as chairman of the board for three years. In 1872 he resumed his former position as state prison inspector. In 1875 he was appointed to the Lancaster Industrial School for Girls board of trustees by Governor William Gaston. In 1876, Hall represented the First Essex district in the Massachusetts Senate. The following year he was elected to the Massachusetts Governor's Council. In 1880 and 1881 he again served in the state senate.

== Business career ==
Hall worked as a grocery store clerk until entering the shoe manufacturing business in the office of Thomas Raddin. He started a factory in Lynn, Massachusetts and manufactured shoes and boots from 1850 to 1874. He was associated with George Raddin from 1850 to 1852 and John W. Newhall from 1852 and 1855 before going into business solo.

Hall was also a founder and longtime president of the Saugus Mutual Fire Insurance Company. For the last six years of his life, he was associated with Lewis & Newhall, a Lynn real estate and insurance firm. Hall died on June 30, 1891.
