= Nathaniel Wales (American politician) =

American politician

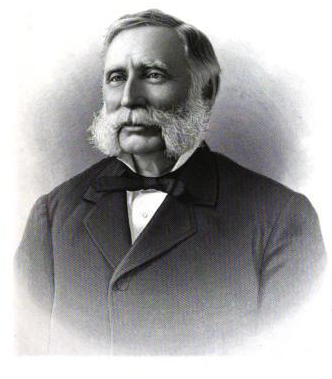

Member of the Massachusetts Senate from the 1st Norfolk district
- In office 1880–1881
- Preceded by: Albert Palmer
- Succeeded by: David W. Tucker

Commonwealth of Massachusetts Executive Council 2nd district
- In office 1881–1884

Personal details
- Born: November 25, 1819 North Bridgewater now Brockton, Massachusetts
- Died: February 8, 1901 Stoughton, Massachusetts
- Party: Republican
- Spouse(s): J. Montgomery Shaw (m. June 4, 1848, d. May 3, 1849); Susan Kingsbury Reed (m. 1851, d. January 1, 1882)
- Children: Susan R. (Reed) Faxon (b. 1853), Timothy Reed (b. 1856 - d. 1870)
- Occupation: Shoe Manufacturer

Nathaniel Wales was an American businessman and politician from the Commonwealth of Massachusetts.

Wales was born on November 25, 1819, in Brockton, Massachusetts. He was a direct descendant of Major General Humphrey Atherton. Wales attended public schools in Brockton and Bridgewater, Massachusetts. He worked as a teacher in the Brockton area and was a high school principal in Pawtucket, Rhode Island, until 1843, when he entered the retail business in Stoughton, Massachusetts.

A member of the Republican Party, Wales served as Postmaster of Stoughton from 1860 to 1867. In 1862, Massachusetts Governor Andrew appointed Wales commissioner to superintend the drafting of militia for Norfolk County. Afterwards Wales was appointed by President Lincoln as United States commissioner of the Board of Enrollment for the Second District of Massachusetts from 1863 to 1865. In 1867, Wales was appointed assessor of the second district of internal revenue and held it until it was abolished in 1872.

In 1879 he was elected to serve in the Massachusetts Senate. In the legislature he was the Chairman of the Committee on Roads and Bridges. In 1881 he was elected to the Executive Council for the second district.

Wales died on February 8, 1901, in Stoughton.

== See also ==
- 101st Massachusetts General Court (1880)

== Bibliography ==
- A Manual for the Use of the General Court By Stephen Nye Gifford pp. 271, 363 (1882).
- History of Norfolk County, Massachusetts: With Biographical Sketches of Many of Its Pioneers and Prominent Men Vol I. By Duane Hamilton Hurd pp. 412–414. (1884).
