= Robert Oliver Fuller =

American businessman and politician (1829–1903)

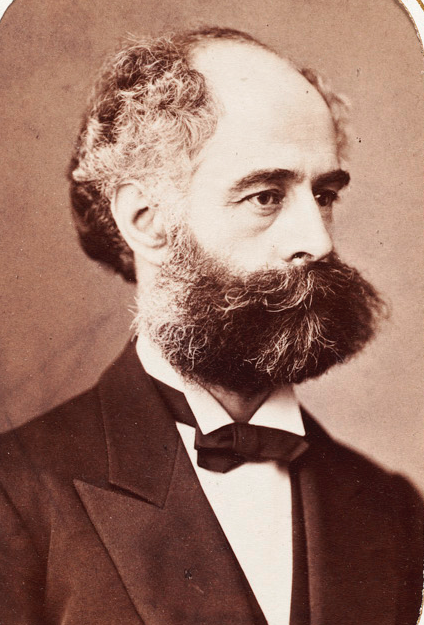

Robert Oliver Fuller (September 12, 1829 – March 9, 1903) was a businessman and state senator in Massachusetts. He was a trustee for educational institutions.

He lived on a farm when he was young. He was in the metals business. He married and had seven children, including a son named after him.

== See also ==
- 1872 Massachusetts legislature
- 1873 Massachusetts legislature
- Eustace Carey Fitz, business, personal, and political colleague
