= 1882 Boston mayoral election =

Election in Massachusetts, United States

- December 12, 1882
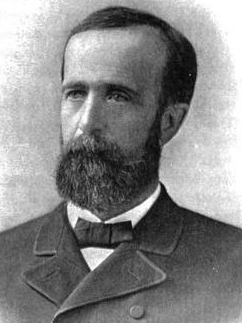

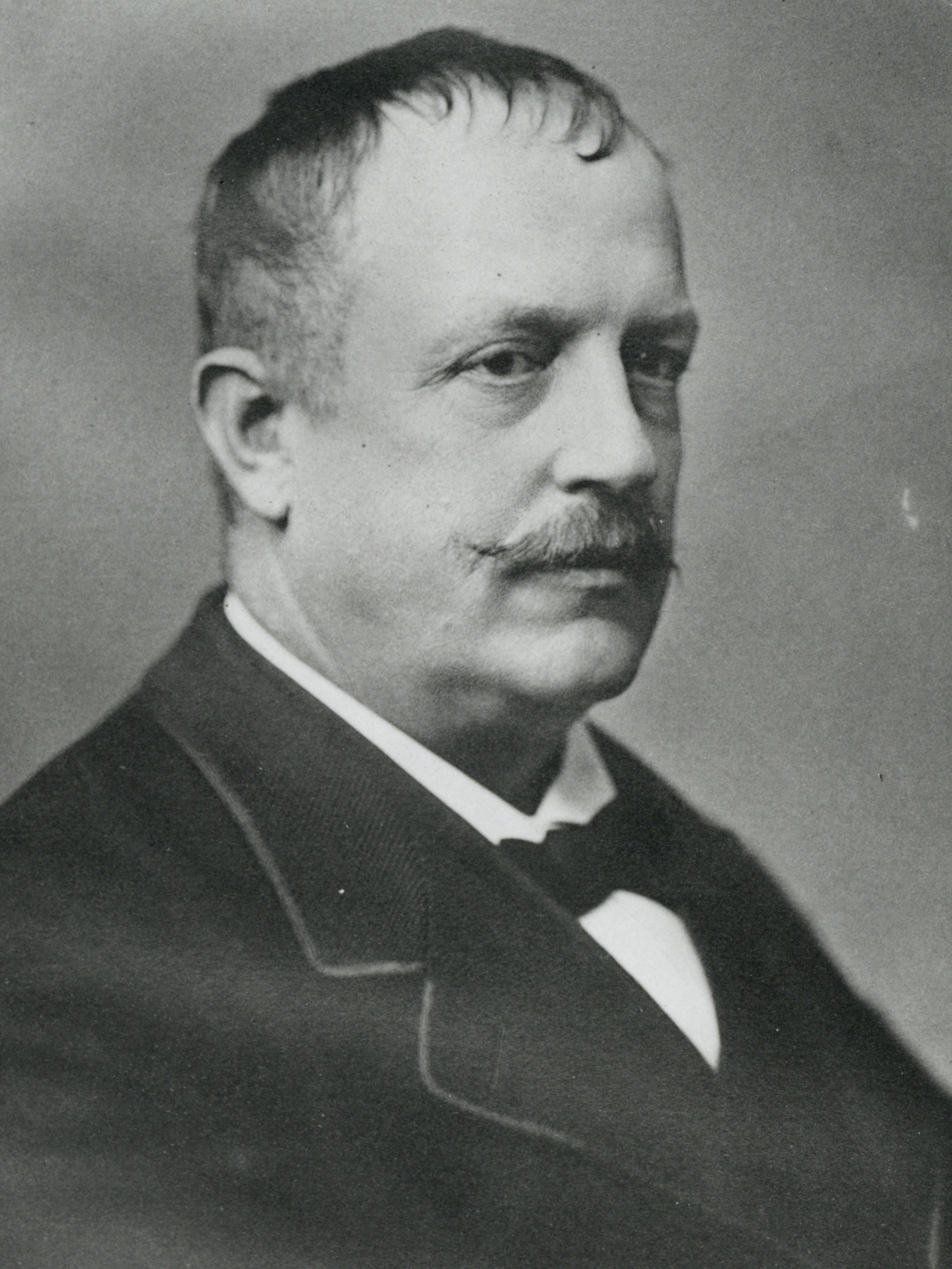
Candidate	Albert Palmer	Samuel Abbott Green
Party	Democratic	Republican
Popular vote	21,713	19,575
Percentage	52.59%	47.41%
Mayor before election
Samuel Abbott Green
Republican
Elected mayor
Albert Palmer
Democratic

The Boston mayoral election of 1882 saw the election of Albert Palmer, who defeated incumbent mayor Samuel Abbott Green.

== Results ==
1882 Boston mayoral election
Party	Candidate	Votes	%
Republican	Albert Palmer	21,713	52.59%
Democratic	Samuel Abbott Green (incumbent)	19,575	47.41%
Turnout		41,288	

== See also ==
- List of mayors of Boston, Massachusetts
