= 1883 Boston mayoral election =

Election in Massachusetts, United States

- December 11, 1883
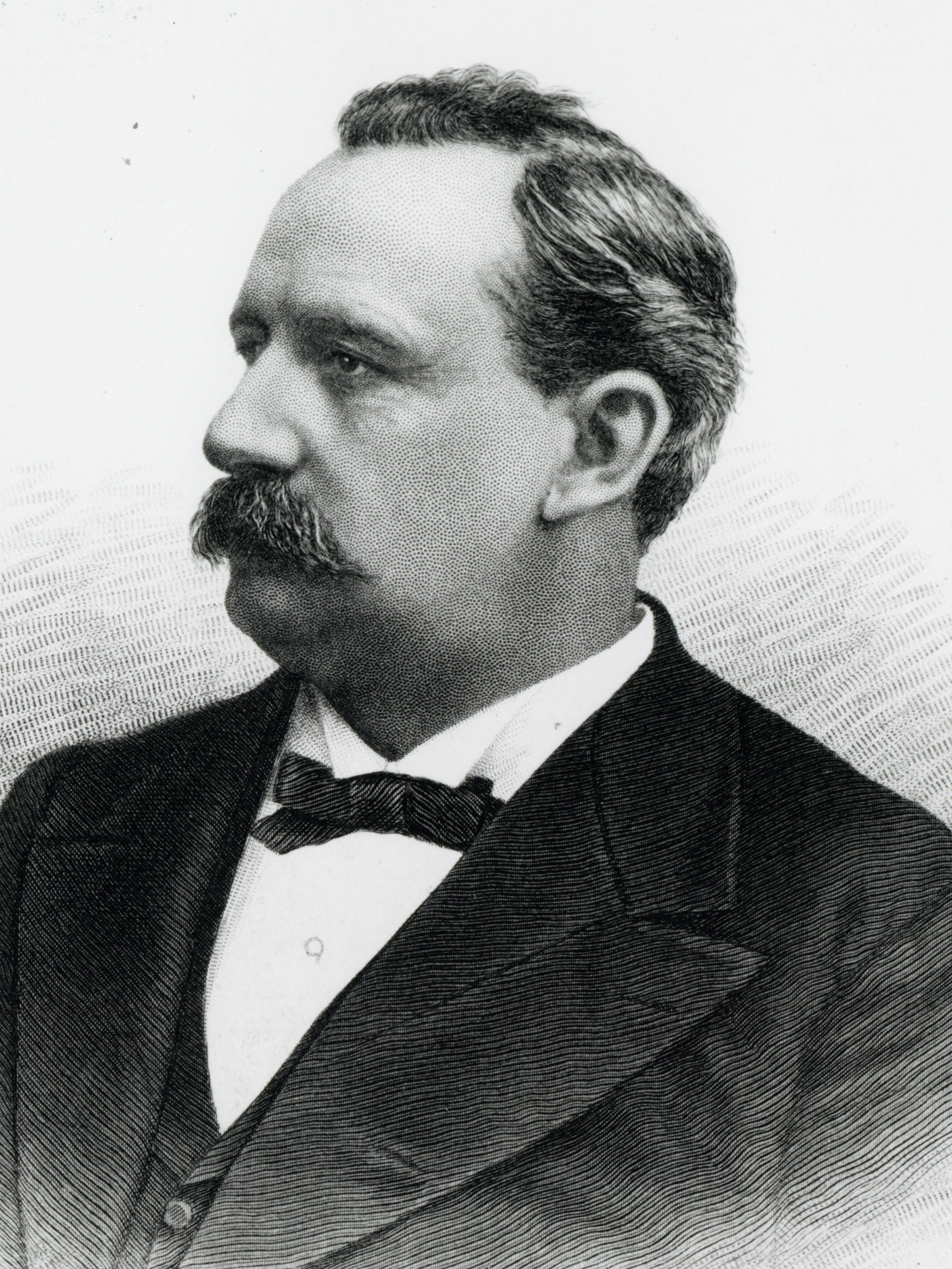

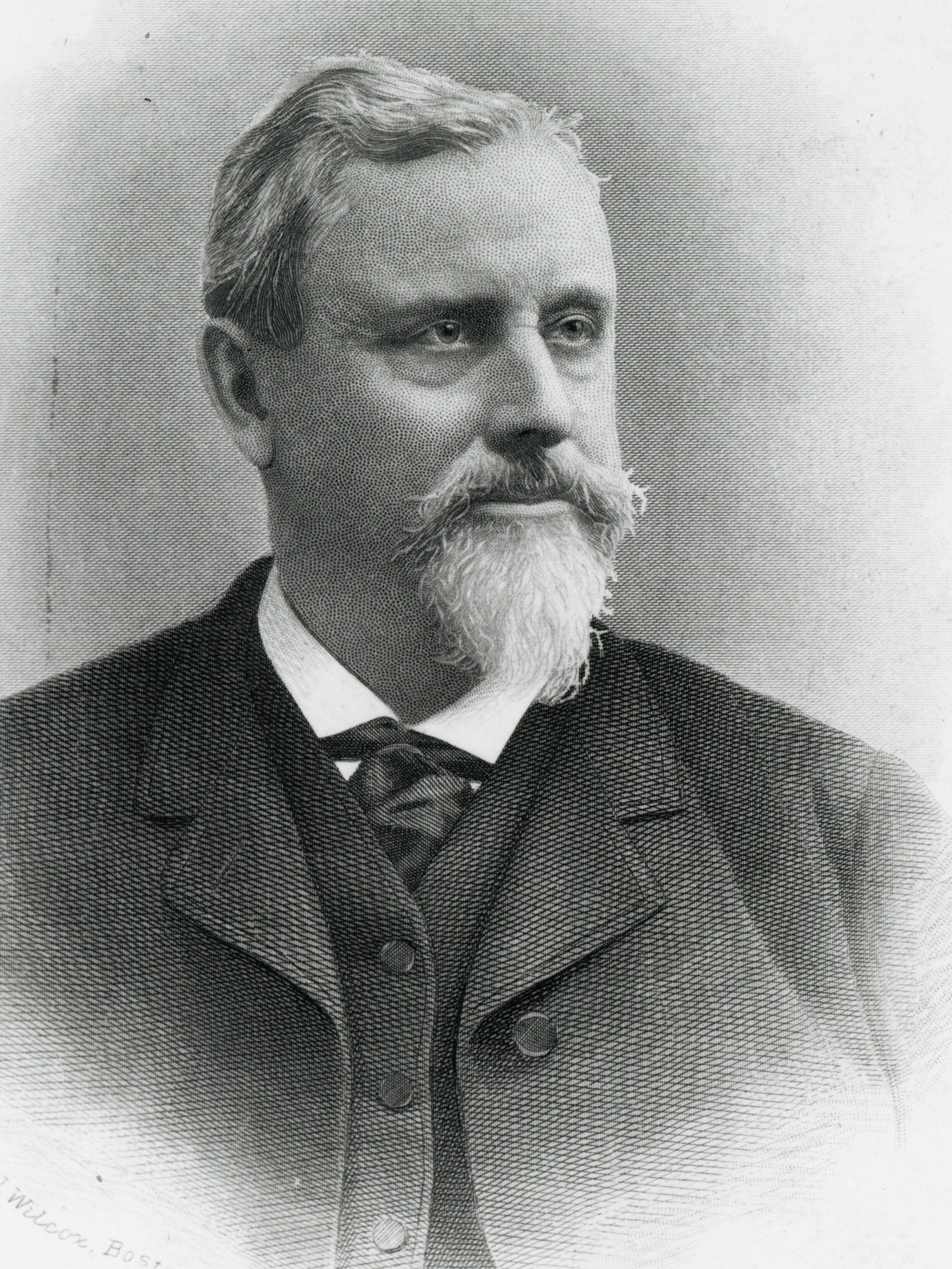
Candidate	Augustus Pearl Martin	Hugh O'Brien
Party	Republican	Democratic
Popular vote	27,494	25,950
Percentage	51.45%	48.56%
Mayor before election
Albert Palmer
Democratic
Elected mayor
Augustus Pearl Martin
Republican

The Boston mayoral election of 1883 saw the election of Augustus Pearl Martin.

== Results ==
1883 Boston mayoral election
Party	Candidate	Votes	%
Republican	Augustus Pearl Martin	27,494	51.45%
Democratic	Hugh O'Brien	25,950	48.56%
Turnout		53,444	

== See also ==
- List of mayors of Boston, Massachusetts
