= 1874 Massachusetts legislature =

95th Massachusetts General Court
←	94th	96th	→

Overview
- Legislative body: General Court
- Election: November 4, 1873

Senate
- Members: 40
- President: George B. Loring
- Party control: Republican

House of Representatives
- Members: 240
- Speaker: John E. Sanford
- Party control: Republican

Sessions
- 1st: January 7, 1874 – June 30, 1874

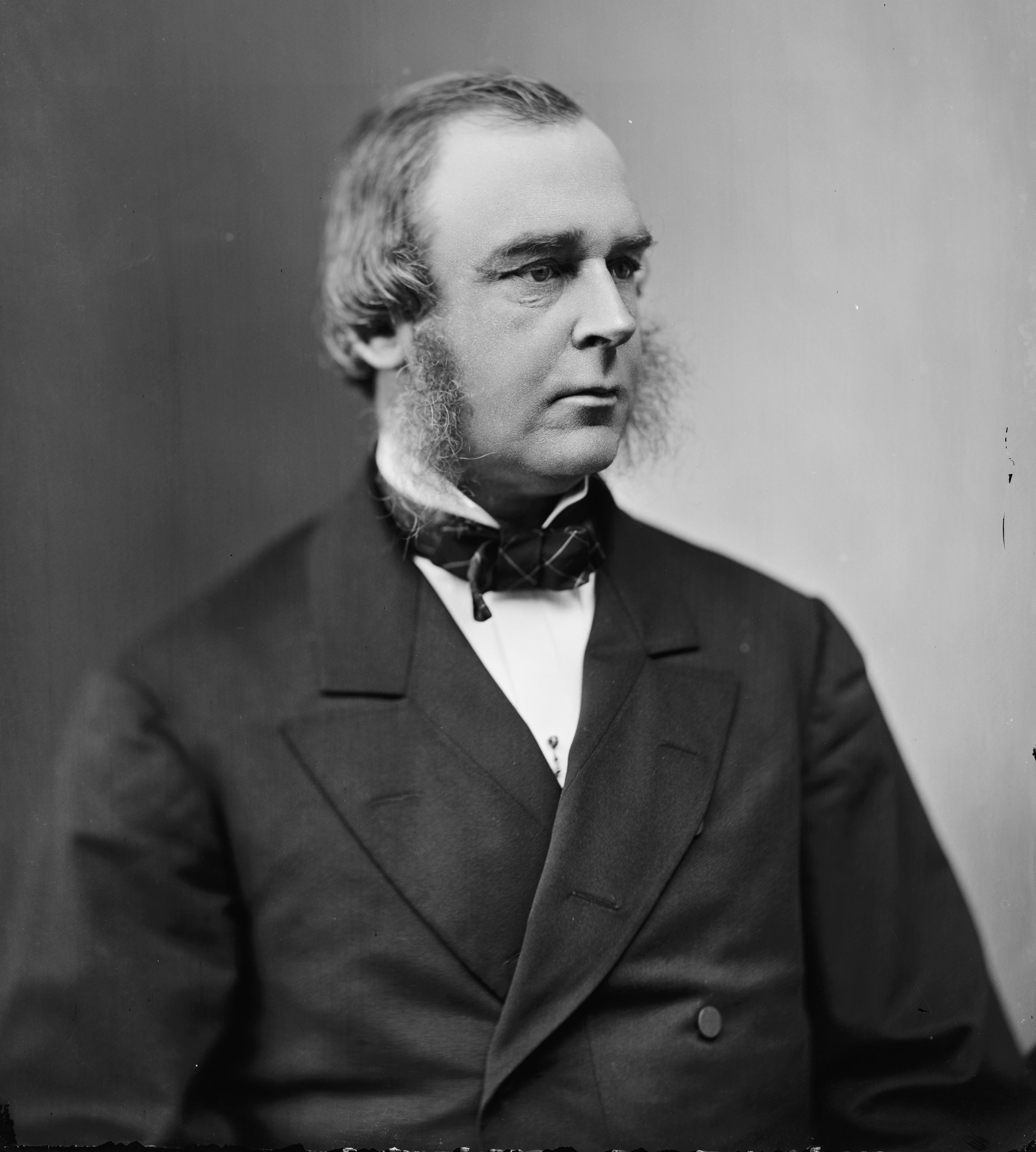
George Loring, Senate president.

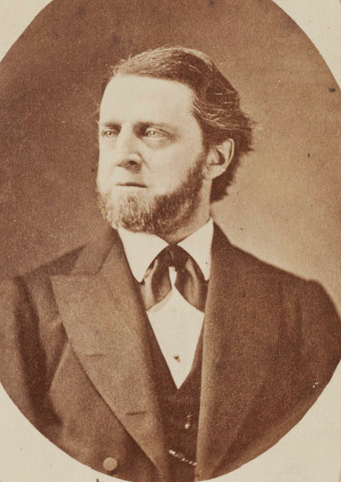
John Eliot Sanford, House speaker.

Leaders of the Massachusetts General Court, 1874.

The 95th Massachusetts General Court, consisting of the Massachusetts Senate and the Massachusetts House of Representatives, met in 1874 during the governorships of William B. Washburn and Thomas Talbot. George B. Loring served as president of the Senate and John E. Sanford served as speaker of the House.

== Senators ==
Image	Name	Date of birth	District	Party
	David Aiken	1804	Franklin	
	Horace Clinton Bacon	1824	3rd Essex	
	Andrew Jackson Bailey	1840	1st Middlesex	
	Prentiss Chaffee Baird	1832	Berkshire and Hampshire	
	Henry Lewis Bancroft	1821	3rd Worcester	
	Julius K. Banister		4th Suffolk	
	Nathaniel P. Banks	January 30, 1816	2nd Middlesex	
	Brooks Trull Batcheller	1813	6th Middlesex	
	Erastus P. Carpenter	November 23, 1822	3rd Norfolk	
	Jedediah Dwelley	1834	Norfolk and Plymouth	
	Francis Edson	1823	Hampshire	
	Charles Fitz	1806	5th Essex	
	Charles Howe French	1814	2nd Norfolk	
	Henry Fuller	1825	2nd Hampden	
	Jeremiah Gatchell	1834	2nd Worcester	
	John A. Hawes	1823	2nd Bristol	
	Francis B. Hayes	1819	2nd Suffolk	
	Thomas Prentiss Hurlbut	1820	5th Middlesex	
	Thomas Ingalls	1824	1st Essex	
	Francis Wayland Jacobs	1837	3rd Suffolk	
	Nathaniel Lafayette Johnson	1822	4th Worcester	
	Jonathan A. Lane	1822	5th Suffolk	
	Edward Howard Lathrop	1838	1st Hampden	
	Edward Learned	1820	Berkshire	
	George B. Loring	November 8, 1817	2nd Essex	
	William Croade Lovering	February 25, 1835	1st Bristol	
	Walter Neal Mason	1824	4th Middlesex	
	Moody Merrill	1836	1st Norfolk	
	Amasa Norcross	January 26, 1824	5th Worcester	
	Francis Augustus Nye	1823	Island	
	Ezra Parmenter	March 20, 1823	3rd Middlesex	
	Edward Payson Reed	1836	2nd Plymouth	
	William Francis Salmon	1831	7th Middlesex	
	Charles Pickett Stickney	1824	3rd Bristol	
	Thomas Newcomb Stone	1818	Cape	
	Hugh James Toland	1844	6th Suffolk	
	George F. Verry	July 14, 1826	1st Worcester	
	Zenas Caldwell Wardwell	1831	4th Essex	
	Henry Stevenson Washburn	1813	1st Suffolk	
	Tisdale Sanford White	1809	1st Plymouth	

== Representatives ==
image	Name	Date of birth	District	Party
	William A. Abbott	1834		
	John Quincy Adams II	September 22, 1833		
	William Augustus Adams	1830		
	Charles Alden	1819		
	Andrew Athy	1832		
	Joseph Edmond Bailey	1839		
	Emory Banister	1809		
	Patrick Barry	1834		
	George Bartholmesz	1821		
	William Garry Bassett	1843		
	John Henry Bell	1829		
	John Bigelow	1841		
	Samuel Partridge Billings	1819		
	Sanford Waters Billings	1834		
	Robert Roberts Bishop	March 13, 1834		
	Stephen Francis Blaney	1844		
	Richard Delano Blinn	1831		
	John Cutter Blood	1836		
	William Edward Blunt	1840		
	Enos Watson Boise	1840		
	Dennis Bonner	1821		
	Frederick Lincoln Bosworth	1836		
	Samuel Hyde Boutwell	1838		
	Reuben Boynton	1815		
	Shubael Wilmarth Brayton	1822		
	Richard Britton	1838		
	William Blanchard Brown	1821		
	James Needham Buffum	1807		
	Stillman Butterworth	1817		
	Aaron Ozias Buxton	1832		
	James Hazen Carleton	1818		
	Alonzo Augustus Carr	1836		
	Cyrus William Chapman	1813		
	Damon Ebenezer Cheney	1828		
	Elijah Horne Chisholm	1824		
	Albe Cady Clark	1826		
	Francis Elliot Clark	1830		
	Alfred Alonzo Clatur	1835		
	Charles R. Codman	1829		
	Lansing James Cole	1803		
	Patrick Collins	1830		
	Austin Henry Connell	1846		
	Henry Joseph Couch	1831		
	Jeremiah William Coveney	1840		
	George Glover Crocker	1843		
	John Addison Cummings	1838		
	John Cummings	1812		
	Benjamin Connor Currier	1822		
	Francis Chester Curtis	1836		
	John Cushing	1808		
	Levi Lincoln Cushing	1825		
	Thomas Seabury Cushman	1809		
	Timothy John Dacey	1849		
	Curtis Davis	1814		
	Henry Charles Davis	1843		
	John Davol	1822		
	Isaac Walker Derby	1835		
	Edward Dickinson	1803		
	Jarvis Nelson Dunham	1828		
	Edward Eaton	1818		
	Joseph Merrill Eaton	1834		
	Lucian Farnham Eldridge	1839		
	Augustus Bradford Endicott	September 10, 1818		
	James Edward Estabrook			
	George Otis Fairbanks	1815		
	John Brooks Fairbanks	1822		
	Caleb Clesson Field	1810		
	John Hancock Fisher	1807		
	Joseph Emery Fiske	1839		
	Eustace Carey Fitz	1833		
	John Edward Fitzgerald	1844		
	Thomas Francis Fitzgerald	1848		
	John Ware Fletcher	1824		
	William Frost	1822		
	Asabel Gates	1827		
	George Samuel Gates	1817		
	Thomas Gates	1822		
	Ziba Gay	1823		
	William Benedict Gibson	1819		
	Addison Gilbert	1808		
	John James Giles	1810		
	Samuel Slocum Ginnodo	1816		
	Samuel Staples Gleason	1841		
	Levi Lincoln Goodspeed	1822		
	Elbridge Henry Goss	1830		
	Andrew Jackson Gove	1834		
	Brownell Granger	1835		
	Francis Edward Gray	1844		
	Charles Hale	June 7, 1831		
	Gayton Montgomery Hall	1835		
	Nahum Bathrick Hall	1823		
	Solomon Eldridge Hallett	1833		
	Abraham Wilkinson Harris	1829		
	Joshua Prentiss Haskell	1835		
	Horace Haskins	1829		
	John Ferguson Haskins	1831		
	Benjamin Franklin Hayes			
	Samuel Morse Haynes	1833		
	Benjamin Heath	1821		
	Allen Higginbottom	1826		
	James Edward Hill	1838		
	John Beckford Hill	1824		
	Joseph Warren Hill	1837		
	George Hodges	1822		
	Norton Eugene Hollis	1840		
	Theodore Myers House	1840		
	Benjamin Howard	1819		
	Andrew Howes	1826		
	David Porter Howes	1815		
	Francis M. Hughes	1845		
	Edward Gilbert Hull	1834		
	J. B. Hull			
	James Douglass Hurlburt	1832		
	Richardson Hutchinson	1818		
	Nathan Sumner Jenkins	1820		
	Edward Jonathan Johnson	1832		
	Jonathan Johnson	1818		
	Laburton Johnson	1827		
	Edward Jenkins Jones	1822		
	Erastus Jones	September 11, 1825		
	George Washington Jones	1822		
	Thomas Milton Judd	1840		
	Jesse Edson Keith	1824		
	Elbridge Gerry Kelley			
	Charles Henry Killam	1832		
	Moses Kimball	October 24, 1809		
	Ebenezer Kimball	1818		
	George Parkman Kingsley	1840		
	Lucius Woodman Knight	1830		
	William Shadrach Knox	September 10, 1843		
	Samuel Orson Lamb	1821		
	Henry Douglas Lay	1824		
	Daniel James Lewis	1810		
	Willard Lewis	1808		
	Frederick Walker Lincoln	1817		
	Joseph Chase Little			
	Lewis Lombard	1819		
	Edward Payson Loring	1837		
	Samuel Loring			
	Charles Addison Loud	1829		
	Henry Bacon Lovering	April 8, 1841		
	Aaron Low	August 11, 1833		
	Horatio Atwood Lucas	1827		
	Julius Miner Lyon	1828		
	John Thomson Manny			
	Albert Mason	1836		
	Lyman Mason	1815		
	David Mayhew	1834		
	Horace Hawkes Mayhew	1826		
	Edward McCleave			
	Daniel McCowan	1838		
	John Johnson McNutt	1822		
	James Lincoln Merritt	1816		
	Albert Montague	1822		
	John Brooks Moore	1817		
	John Farwell Moors			
	Joseph Brown Morss	1808		
	Andrew Marathon Morton	1839		
	William Henry Murray	1826		
	Avery Williams Nelson	1821		
	Willard Stanley Newhall	1831		
	Reuben Noble	1820		
	Edward Ornan Noyes	1840		
	Porter Nutting	1814		
	Richard E. Olney	1835		
	Almond Mitchell Orcutt	1824		
	Lysander John Orcutt	1826		
	Charles Stuart Osgood	1839		
	Albert Palmer	January 17, 1831		
	James Orlando Parker	November 22, 1827		
	William Crowell Parker	1850		
	William Edward Perkins	1838		
	Henry Willis Phelps	1830		
	Smith Robinson Phillips	1837		
	Willard Peele Phillips	1825		
	Richard Pope	1843		
	Francis Edward Porter	1824		
	Charles Lyman Pratt	1839		
	Henry Loring Pratt	1833		
	Edward Benedict Rankin	1846		
	Lawrence Reade	1835		
	Daniel Franklin Reed	1834		
	John Wilder Rice	1818		
	Jeremiah A. Rich	1823		
	John Andrew Grant Richardson	1840		
	George D. Robinson	January 20, 1834		
	Charles Robinson	1829		
	Joshua Crowell Robinson	1834		
	Philip Henry Robinson	1823		
	Joseph Warren Rogers	1828		
	William Rea Roundy	1823		
	Nathaniel Johnson Rust	1833		
	John Eliot Sanford	November 22, 1830		
	George Jedediah Sanger	1826		
	Cyrus Savage	September 2, 1832		
	John Savery	1815		
	Levi Heywood Sawin	1816		
	Isaac Fessenden Sawtelle			
	Nathaniel Seaver	1807		
	Edwin Henry Seymour	1834		
	Henry Perkins Shattuck	1844		
	Charles Luther Shaw	1823		
	George Atwood Shaw	1816		
	John Shaw	1822		
	Henry Shortle	1834		
	Warren Sibley	1819		
	William Lawton Slade	1817		
	John Killbourne Clough Sleeper	1828		
	George Dillingham Smalley	1824		
	Joshua Bowen Smith	1813		
	Abraham Howland Smith	1833		
	Albert Smith	1823		
	Moses Smith	1815		
	Rufus Smith	1816		
	Sumner Southworth	1804		
	Franklin Harvey Sprague	1825		
	Richard Hall Stearns	December 25, 1824		
	Ezra Stearns	1812		
	Isaac Stebbins	1817		
	John Henry Studley	1828		
	Daniel Joseph Sweeney	1834		
	George Washington Taft	1823		
	James Gamage Tarr			
	Daniel Holt Thurston	1813		
	Artemas Stanley Tyler	1824		
	Warren Tyler	1819		
	Leonard Washburn	1813		
	Timothy W. Wellington	1811		
	Michael Francis Wells	1832		
	Cyrus Martin Wheaton	1794		
	Simon Huntington White	1832		
	William Whiting	1816		
	Robert Rich Wiley	1828		
	James Burr Williams	1839		
	Moses Williams	1846		
	Henry Warren Wilson	1834		
	Samuel Winslow	1827		
	Henry Vose Woods	1821		
	George Cleveland Wright	1823		
	Henry Willis Wright	1834		

== See also ==
- 43rd United States Congress
- List of Massachusetts General Courts

== Images ==
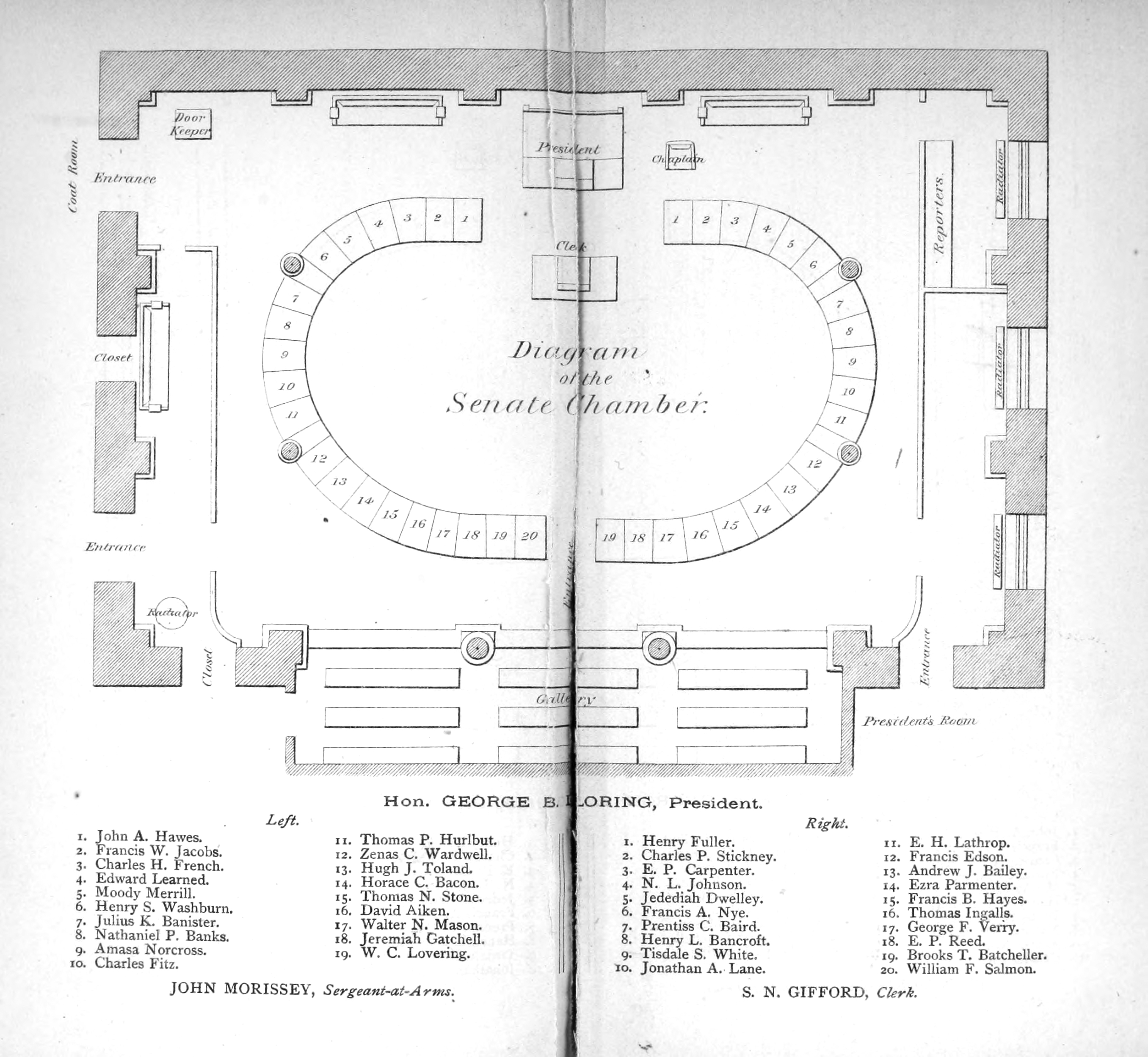
Seating diagram for senators in the State House, 1874
