= 1881 Boston mayoral election =

Election in Massachusetts, United States

- December 13, 1881
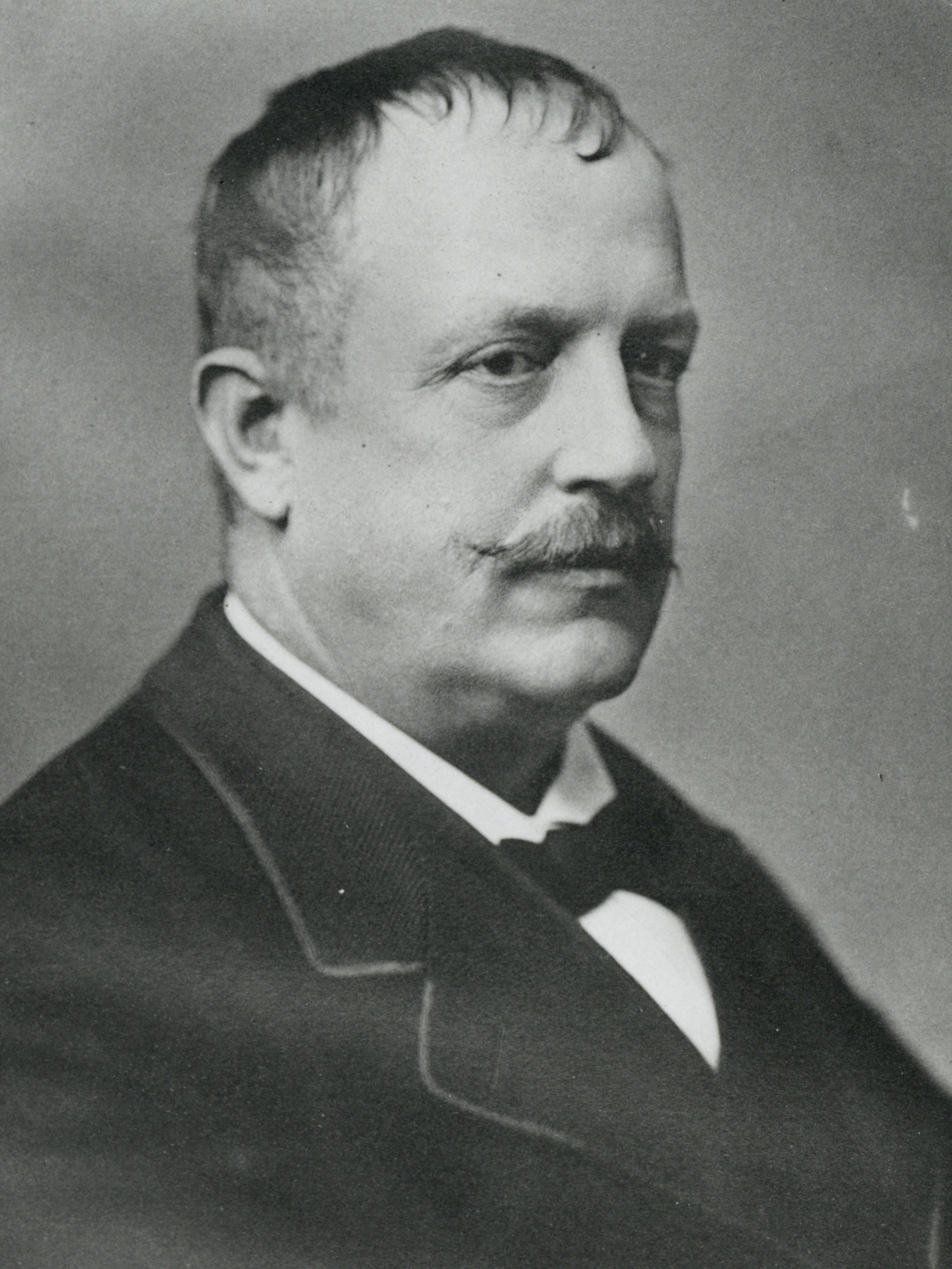

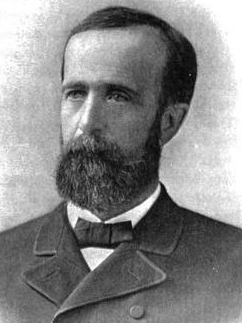
Candidate	Samuel Abbott Green	Albert Palmer
Party	Republican	Democratic
Popular vote	20,429	19,724
Percentage	50.86%	49.11%
Mayor before election
Frederick O. Prince
Democratic
Elected mayor
Samuel Abbott Green
Republican

The Boston mayoral election of 1881 saw the election of Samuel Abbott Green.

== Results ==
1881 Boston mayoral election
Party	Candidate	Votes	%
Republican	Samuel Abbott Green	20,429	50.86%
Democratic	Albert Palmer	19,724	49.11%
Others	Scattering	14	0.04%
Turnout		40,167	

== See also ==
- List of mayors of Boston, Massachusetts
