= Ebenezer Torrey =

American lawyer, banker, politician (1801–1888)

Massachusetts House of Representatives
- In office 1832–1832

Massachusetts House of Representatives
- In office 1847–1847

70th Massachusetts Senate
- In office January 3, 1849 – May 2, 1849

Personal details
- Born: August 16, 1801 Franklin, Massachusetts, U.S.
- Died: September 3, 1888 (aged 87) Fitchburg, Massachusetts, U.S.
- Resting place: Laurel Hill Cemetery, Fitchburg, Massachusetts, U.S.
- Spouse(s): Frances Adams Houghton (m. 1825), Sarah Arnold (m. 1832)
- Children: 4, including George Arnold Torrey
- Occupation: Lawyer, banker, politician

Ebenezer Torrey (August 16, 1801 – September 3, 1888) was an American lawyer, banker, and politician. He served in the Massachusetts House of Representatives for Worcester County in 1832 and 1847; and was a member of the Massachusetts Senate in 1849. His law firm was named Torrey & Wood in Fitchburg, Massachusetts. Torrey was one of the incorporators of the Fitchburg Bank (now Rollstone Bank and Trust).

== Early life and education ==
Ebenezer Torrey was born on August 16, 1801, in Franklin, Massachusetts. His parents were Sarah "Sally" Richardson (née Eddy) and John Torrey.

He graduated in 1822 from Harvard College. After graduation he moved to Fitchburg, Massachusetts to study law under John Shepley.

== Career ==
In 1825, Torrey was admitted to the Worcester County Bar (precursor to the Massachusetts Bar), and he was the first to do so. His law firm was a partnership with Nathanial Wood, named Torrey & Wood (active from 1827 to 1873) in Fitchburg, Massachusetts.

In 1832, Torrey was one of the incorporators of the Fitchburg Bank (now Rollstone Bank and Trust).

Torrey served in the Massachusetts House of Representatives for Worcester County in 1832 and 1847; was a member of the Massachusetts Senate in 1849, and was the chairman of the Committee on Banks and Banking.

== Death and legacy ==
Torrey died on September 3, 1888, in Fitchburg, Massachusetts.

His son George Arnold Torrey (1838–1911) was also a lawyer and politician.

== See also ==
- 1849 Massachusetts legislature
