= Eustace Carey Fitz =

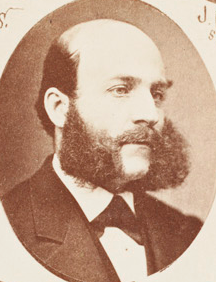

Eustace Carey Fitz II (5 February 1833 - 27 May 1895) was an American businessman, mayor, and state legislator in Massachusetts. He wrote ' the pamphlet "The High School in Its Relation to Business Life" published in 1884.

Born in Haverhill, Massachusetts, he was the son of Jeremiah and Hannah née Easton Fitz. In 1841 he moved to Chelsea, Massachusetts.

Fitz served on the common council including as president and was mayor of Chelsea from 1864 to 1866. He was a library trustee for 18 years and donated a building to the library at the end of his service.

He was part of an iron merchant firm Fuller, Dana & Fitz. In 1873 and 1874 he served in the Massachusetts House of Representatives and in the Massachusetts Senate in 1875 and 1876. In 1881 and 1882 he was on the governor's council. He also served as chairman of the commissioners of prisons. He was president of the Newton Theological Institution.

Fitz married Sarah Jane Blanchard and they had four children.

Eustace Carey Fitz II died on 27 May 1895, in Chelsea, Suffolk, Massachusetts, United States, at the age of 62, and was buried in Boston, Suffolk, Massachusetts, United States.

== See also ==
- 1873 Massachusetts legislature
- 1874 Massachusetts legislature
- 1875 Massachusetts legislature
- 1876 Massachusetts legislature
