= Erastus Payson Carpenter =

American politician and businessman (1822–1902)

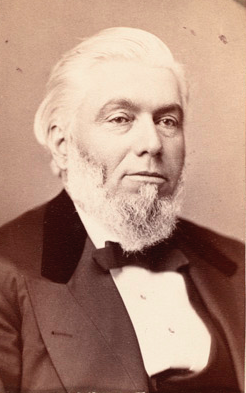

Erastus Payson Carpenter (November 23, 1822 – January 31, 1902) was an American politician and businessman in Massachusetts. He lived in Foxborough, Massachusetts, where he was a community leaderr. He was elected to the Massachusetts Senate in 1872.

== Early life and education ==
Born in Foxborough, Massachusetts, to Daniel and Abigail (Payson) Carpenter, his father was a veteran of the War of 1812 and a successful manufacturer and businessman.

Carpenter received his early education in the public schools of Foxborough, and also attended several private and academy schools, including Tolman's private school, Baker's Academy in Dorchester, and Day's Academy in Wrentham. He also studied under the Rev. Mortimer Blake.

== Business career ==
Before completing preparation for college, Carpenter chose to enter business. At age twenty, he began work in the straw goods trade with his cousins, Oliver and Warren Carpenter. In 1843, while still a minor, he entered into partnership with Warren Carpenter and managed a branch store in Richmond, Virginia. In 1852, in partnership with Oliver Carpenter, he built the Union Straw Works in Foxborough, which became the largest establishment of its kind in the world, employing approximately 6,000 people. During this time, Carpenter organized the Foxborough Fire Department in 1850 and served as captain of the Cocasset Fire Engine Company. A chromolithograph print was made of the factory. It burned in 1900.

Carpenter remained involved in the business until 1861, when he traveled to London and sold the enterprise to Vyse & Company, continuing thereafter as superintendent and manager, and remaining connected with the business until 1870. He also held investments in telegraph and railroad enterprises, becoming a major stockholder in the local telegraph company, which built a line between Foxborough and Mansfield in the late 1850s.

Carpenter was also instrumental in organizing the Foxborough Branch Railroad, which later became part of the Mansfield and Framingham Railroad, of which he served as the first president, and was at one time a controlling shareholder. He also served as president of the Framingham and Lowell Railroad, the Martha's Vineyard Railroad, and of a proposed New York, Boston, Albany and Schenectady Railroad.

== Military and political service ==
During the American Civil War, Carpenter was active in supporting the Union. In 1861, he organized and was elected captain of a rifle company, though it was not accepted into federal service due to its use of rifles rather than muskets. He also chaired a committee responsible for distributing $10,000 in town funds to aid volunteers and their families. In recognition of his contributions, a Grand Army of the Republic post was later named in his honor.

He was elected to the Massachusetts Senate in 1872, serving there until 1874. He was chairman of the railroad committee, and was noted for delivering a widely circulated argument on the Hoosac Tunnel project, with 10,000 copies ordered printed by the Senate. He also held various offices in Foxborough, including chairman of the selectmen, highway surveyor, and overseer of the poor.

He supported educational initiatives, helping to establish and fund the private Foxborough English and Classical School. It was succeeded by Foxborough High School. He also provided financial backing for a local literary weekly, the Home Library, in 1857, and helped establish Rock Hill Cemetery in Foxborough. The house at 47 Ocean Park in Oak Bluffs was built for him in 1868. It is extant.

He remained involved in business interests, particularly including real estate and construction projects across Massachusetts and nearby regions, including building straw manufacturing facilities, hotels, and other structures in Nantucket, Medfield, Cottage City (later Oak Bluffs), and Shelter Island Park, New York.

== Personal life ==
On February 4, 1844, Carpenter married Catharine E. Kerr, daughter of William and Hannah (Hall) Kerr. They had five children, Gardner Anson, William Daniels, Julia Alice, Jennie Wood, and Catherine Payson. Carpenter built a cottage in the town of Oak Bluffs on Martha's Vineyard, and also supported the development of that community.

He collapsed and died at the Common he helped create in Foxborough.

== See also ==
- 1872 Massachusetts legislature
- 1873 Massachusetts legislature
- 1874 Massachusetts legislature
