= George Walter Lobdell =

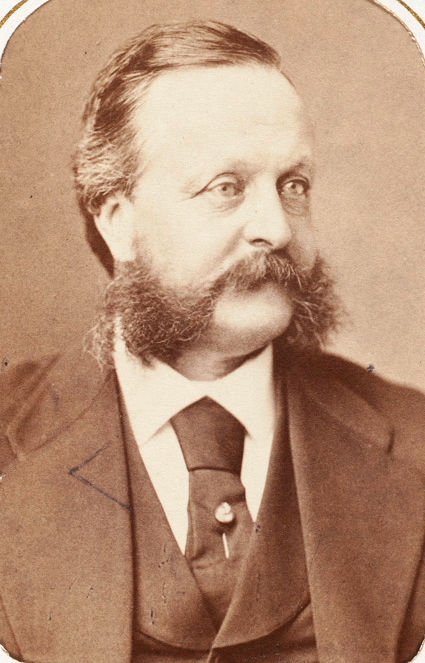

George Walter Lobdell (1823–1874) was a state senator in Massachusetts. He served in the 1872 Massachusetts legislature and 1873 Massachusetts legislature.

A masonry and earthworks contractor, owned an estate in Mattapoisett. He married Lucy LeBaron Meigs. (1826–1897). He represented the First Plymouth District.
