= 1872 Massachusetts legislature =

93rd Massachusetts General Court
←	92nd	94th	→

Overview
- Legislative body: General Court
- Election: November 7, 1871

Senate
- Members: 40
- President: Horace H. Coolidge
- Party control: Republican (35 R, 0 D, 5 other)

House
- Members: 240
- Speaker: John E. Sanford
- Party control: Republican (176 R, 0 D, 64 other)

Sessions
- 1st: January 3, 1872 – May 7, 1872 + extra session

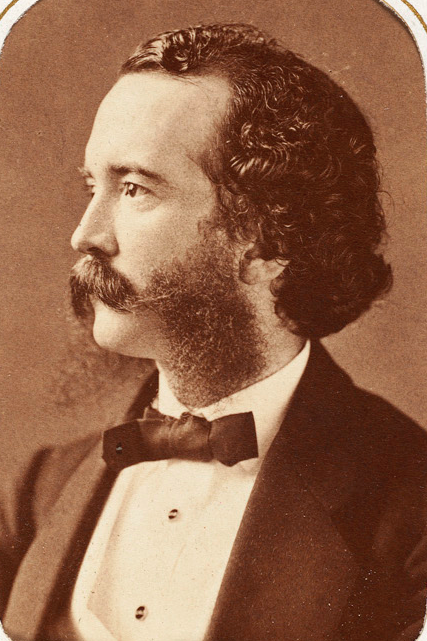
Horace Coolidge, Senate president.

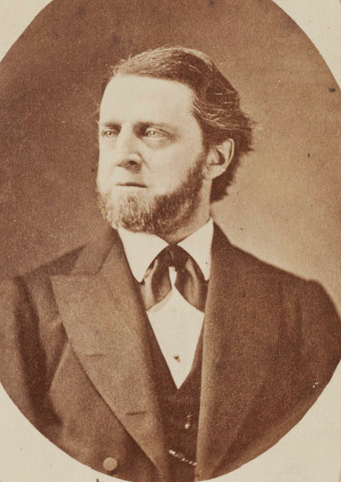
John Sanford, House speaker.

Leaders of the Massachusetts General Court, 1872.

The 93rd Massachusetts General Court, consisting of the Massachusetts Senate and the Massachusetts House of Representatives, met in 1872 during the governorship of Republican William B. Washburn. Horace H. Coolidge served as president of the Senate and John E. Sanford served as speaker of the House.

== Senators ==
Image	Name	Date of birth	District	Party
	Frederick Lothrop Ames	June 8, 1835		
	Joseph Kelley Baker	1827		
	Andrew Jackson Bartholomew	1834		
	Alonzo Warren Boardman	1828		
	Charles Bradley	1816		
	Elisha Huntington Brewster			
	Erastus Payson Carpenter	November 23, 1822		
	Isaac Henry Coe	1818		
	Horace Hopkins Coolidge	February 11, 1832		
	Rufus Smith Frost	July 18, 1826		
	Robert Oliver Fuller	1829		
	Newell Giles	1818		
	Samuel Moulton Griggs	1822		
	Orrin Hewes	1833		
	James Humphrey	1819		
	Francis Wayland Jacobs	1837		
	Robert Johnson	1823		
	William Henry Learnard	1828		
	George Walter Lobdell	1823		
	William Bennet Long	1827		
	Reuben Noble	1820		
	Lloyd Parsons	1816		
	Josiah Newton Pike	1824		
	Joseph Samson Potter	1822		
	George Francis Richardson	December 6, 1829		
	Daniel Ephraim Safford	1826		
	George Sheldon	November 30, 1818		
	William Lafayette Smith	1824		
	Charles Pickett Stickney	1824		
	John Kemble Tarbox	May 6, 1838		
	Adin Thayer	1828		
	Shepard Thayer	1827		
	George Arnold Torrey	1838		
	Thomas Lafayette Wakefield	1817		
	Levi Wallace	1831		
	Baxter Dodridge Whitney	1817		
	James Scollay Whitney	May 19, 1811		
	Rufus Dodd Woods	1818		
	David Titcomb Woodwell	1820		
	Carroll D. Wright	July 25, 1840		

== Representatives ==
image	Name	Date of birth	District	Party
	Milton Abbey	1819		
	John Henry Abbott	1825		
	Henry Sewall Adams	1832		
	William Augustus Adams	1830		
	William Hastings Aldrich	1825		
	Ephraim Allen	1806		
	Lafayette Anderson	1824		
	William Henry Anderson	1836		
	William Frederick Arnold	1815		
	William Markwick Ashby	1821		
	Oliver Ayers	1821		
	William Babbitt	1817		
	James Prentiss Bacheller	1840		
	Horace Clinton Bacon	1824		
	Andrew Jackson Bailey	1840		
	John Stanton Baldwin	1834		
	Edward Dana Bancroft	1821		
	Julius Kirkland Banister	1833		
	James Madison Barker	1839		
	Lewis Barnard	1815		
	George Bartholmesz	1821		
	George Hubert Bates	1839		
	Austin Williams Benton	1818		
	Alden Besse	1821		
	Edward Lyman Bigelow	1839		
	William Rufus Black	August 23, 1830		
	George Baylis Blake	1823		
	John Williston Blaney	1815		
	William Edward Blunt	1840		
	James William Bradley	1828		
	Bowman Bigelow Breed	1832		
	Frederic Perry Brown	1840		
	Willard Augustus Brown	1828		
	Giles Edwin Brownell	1819		
	Henry Oliver Burr	1829		
	Seneca Burr	1831		
	Samuel Augustus Carlton	1827		
	Michael Carney	1827		
	Thomas Marshall Carter	July 17, 1832		
	Erastus Chase	1826		
	John Cummings Choate	1832		
	John Henry Church	1836		
	Sumner Uriah Church	1810		
	George Washington Clark	1836		
	Nelson Cochran	1824		
	Charles Russell Codman	1829		
	John Bear Doane Cogswell	June 6, 1829		
	Moses Rich Colman	1806		
	Chapin Converse	1811		
	Benjamin Hough Corliss	1818		
	Joseph Howland Cornell	March 23, 1818		
	Joseph Henry Cotton	1833		
	Robert Couch	1817		
	Roswell P. Crafts	September 17, 1822		
	Seth Brockway Crafts	1844		
	Freeborn Woodbury Cressy	1839		
	William Augustus Cressy	1820		
	Michael J. Croak	1843		
	Charles Curtis	1836		
	William Cushing	1823		
	Christopher Columbus Denny	1813		
	Elbridge Curtis Donnell	1839		
	Simeon Parker Dresser	1845		
	James Henry Durgin	1833		
	David Eastman	1806		
	George Henry Eddy	1829		
	Alfred Brewster Ely	1817		
	Augustus Bradford Endicott	September 10, 1818		
	George Otis Fairbanks	1815		
	Henry Hardwick Faxon	1823		
	Hawkes Fearing	1826		
	Francis Fisher	1811		
	Jonathan Philbrick Folsom	October 9, 1820		
	Job Gardner			
	Robert Folger Gardner	1815		
	John Gates	1807		
	Benjamin Whitney Gleason	1806		
	George Going	1824		
	Brownell Granger	1835		
	Edward Waldo Griggs	1834		
	Isaac Dennis Hall	1807		
	John Wilkes Hammond	1837		
	Charles Veranus Hanson	1844		
	Franklin Powers Harlow	December 8, 1827		
	Southworth Harlow	1824		
	John Morton Harris	1819		
	Thomas Burdett Harris	1825		
	George Hatch	1832		
	Benjamin Franklin Hayes	July 3, 1835		
	Horace Heard	1804		
	Horatio Brooks Hersey	1823		
	Lot Higgins	1809		
	Amos Hill	1830		
	Henry Bozyol Hill	1823		
	George Webster Hobbs	1839		
	Thomas Fry Holder	1839		
	Asa Alexander Holton	1818		
	Samuel Bugbee Hopkins	1823		
	Leverett Hopkinson	1822		
	Ezra Coffin Howard	September 1, 1831		
	Jonas Elijah Howe	1814		
	Joseph Sidney Howe	1832		
	Emerson Harris Howland	1846		
	George Henry Hoyt	November 25, 1837		
	Barney Hull	1830		
	George W. Humphrey	1826		
	Nathaniel Mayhew Jernegan	1820		
	Peter Rogers Johnson	1824		
	Henry Jones	1821		
	Horace Israel Joslin	1836		
	Timothy Keefe	1839		
	William Keith	1810		
	Albert Francis Kelley	1840		
	Jonas Kendall	1804		
	George Perry Kendrick	1824		
	Asa Keyes	1805		
	John White Kimball	February 27, 1828		
	Moses Kimball	October 24, 1809		
	Charles M. Kingsley	1811		
	Daniel Webster Knight	1835		
	William Knowlton	1809		
	John Augustus Lamson	1831		
	Almond Ring Lancaster	1829		
	Alvin Lawton	1833		
	Frederick Walker Lincoln	1817		
	Noah Lincoln	1810		
	Edward Payson Loring	1837		
	William Hamilton Loughlin	1847		
	Henry Bacon Lovering	April 8, 1841		
	Alvin Marshall	1815		
	John McDuffie	1828		
	Anson McLoud			
	Christopher Columbus Merritt	September 29, 1830		
	Ira Loriston Moore	1824		
	Benjamin Lyman Morrison	1828		
	Rice Shaw Munn	1814		
	John Joseph Murphy	1842		
	Patrick Murphy	1837		
	William Henry Murray	1826		
	John Newell	1816		
	Jeremiah Lemuel Newton			
	Curtis Coe Nichols	1814		
	Lewis Rufus Norton	1821		
	William Nutt	August 5, 1836		
	Patrick O'Connor	1842		
	William Henry Osborne	1840		
	Liberty Dodge Packard	1831		
	Albert Palmer	January 17, 1831		
	George Alanson Parker	1821		
	James Parker	1815		
	Ezra Parmenter	March 20, 1823		
	Daniel Augustus Patch	1832		
	George Howe Peabody	1838		
	Edward Pearl	1825		
	George O. Peck	1817		
	Francis Ellis Pedrick	1829		
	Jesse Small Pendergrast	1835		
	Noah Cushman Perkins	1810		
	William Perkins	1824		
	Ellis Perry	1809		
	Ralph Perry	1811		
	Josiah Peterson	1820		
	John Wesley Phelps	1844		
	Willard Peele Phillips	1825		
	Charles Varnum Poor	1817		
	George Horace Poor	1841		
	Thomas Whittier Porter	1820		
	Burton Willis Potter	1843		
	Laban Pratt	1829		
	Artemus Conant Putnam	1805		
	Samuel Bell Quigley	1821		
	Samuel Miller Quincy	June 13, 1832		
	Edward Benedict Rankin	1846		
	Joseph Henry Read	1835		
	John Wales Robinson	1826		
	John Randolph Rogerson	1812		
	Joseph Hubbard Root	1823		
	Isaac Newton Ross	1824		
	George Sanborn	1816		
	John Eliot Sanford	November 22, 1830		
	Benjamin Franklin Sargent	1813		
	Irving Bertoldo Sayles	1839		
	Charles Augustus Sayward	1837		
	George Franklin Scribner	1830		
	Nathaniel Sears	1825		
	Robert Seaver	1812		
	George Atwood Shaw	1816		
	George Sheldon	1817		
	James Stratton Shepard	1815		
	Simon Harrison Sibley	1816		
	Reuben Sikes	1824		
	Albert Gallatin Sinclair	1845		
	David Nelson Skillings	1818		
	Charles Eber Slater	1830		
	George Fayette Slocomb	1823		
	Cyrus Burnet Smith	1839		
	John James Smith	1825		
	Zoeth Snow	1825		
	Reuben Goodspeed Sparks	1822		
	Chauncey Loren Spear	1819		
	Henry Splaine	1837		
	Charles Stanwood	1816		
	Francis Dana Stedman	1801		
	William Stone	1827		
	Warner Claflin Sturtevant	1809		
	Charles H. Taylor	1846		
	William Taylor	1831		
	Eliphalet Loring Thayer	1824		
	Noah Blanchard Thayer	1830		
	William Henry Thomas	1829		
	Charles Perkins Thompson	July 7, 1827		
	John Thomas Zebediah Thompson	1811		
	Charles Q. Tirrell	December 10, 1844		
	Hugh James Toland	1844		
	Joseph Rice Torrey	1828		
	Edward Justus Tower	1833		
	George Edwin Towne	1829		
	Thomas Bush Tripp	1838		
	David Warren Tucker	1820		
	Obed Chester Turner	1840		
	William Upham	1825		
	Charles Folsom Walcott	December 22, 1836		
	Ansel Hill Ward	1837		
	George Washington Ware	1837		
	Henry Stevenson Washburn	1813		
	Thomas Barstow Waterman	1830		
	Nathan Horace Webb	1835		
	Tisdale Sanford White	1809		
	William Henry Whitfield	November 11, 1804		
	Frederick Theodore Whiting	1825		
	William Joseph Wightman	1810		
	Ludovicus French Wild	1825		
	Benjamin Franklin Wing	October 22, 1822		
	Ezra Dyer Winslow	1839		
	Harding Woods	1822		
	Lyman Woodward	1831		
	Albert Judd Wright			
	Ira Berkeley Wright	1830		
	Walter Wyman	1806		

== See also ==
- 42nd United States Congress
- List of Massachusetts General Courts
