= George Arnold Torrey =

American politician, lawyer (1838–1911)

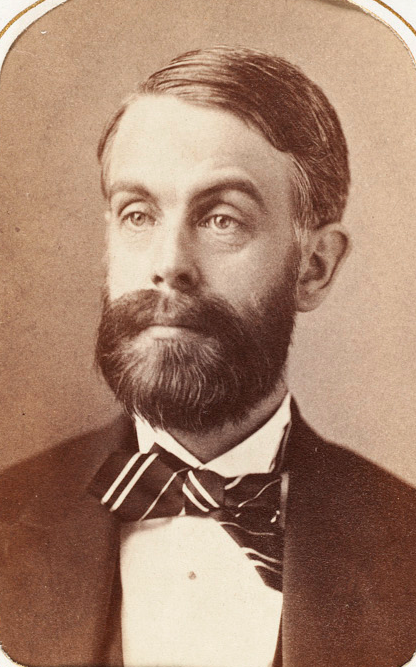
- George Arnold Torrey, 1872
- Born: May 14, 1838; Fitchburg, Massachusetts, U.S.
- Died: July 11, 1911 (aged 73); Boston, Massachusetts, U.S.
- Resting place: Laurel Hill Cemetery, Fitchburg, Massachusetts, U.S.
- Education: Harvard College (BA), Harvard University Law School (JD), Harvard University (MA)
- Occupations: Lawyer, state legislator, writer
- Spouse: Ellen Malibran Shirley (m. 1861)
- Father: Ebenezer Torrey

George Arnold Torrey (May 14, 1838 – July 11, 1911) was an American lawyer and state legislator in Massachusetts. He served in the Massachusetts Senate for Worcester County in 1872 and 1873. Torrey wrote a book about his experiences as a lawyer.

== Life and career ==
George Arnold Torrey was born in May 14, 1838, in Fitchburg, Massachusetts. His parents were Sarah (née Arnold) and Ebenezer Torrey (1801–1888), his father was a lawyer who worked in politics in Massachusetts, and was one of the incorporators of Fitchburg Savings Bank (now Rollstone Bank & Trust).

Torrey graduated from Leicester Academy, a private high school. He attended Harvard College and graduated in 1859 with a B.A. degree, and from Harvard University Law School in 1861. Additionally he received a master's degree in 1862.

In 1861, Torrey married Ellen Malibran Shirley of Boston.

He passed the Massachusetts bar in 1861, and began his legal practice at Wood & Torrey, his father's law firm. For many years he served as the general counsel for the Fitchburg Railroad.

Torrey served in the Massachusetts Senate for Worcester County in 1872 and 1873.

He wrote a book, A Lawyer's Recollections In and Out of Court (1910), about his personal life experience.

Torrey died on July 11, 1911 at Vendome Hotel in Boston, and it was reported he died from the heat.

== See also ==
- 1872 Massachusetts legislature
- 1873 Massachusetts legislature
