= John Elliot Sanford =

American politician (1830–1907)

John E. Sanford
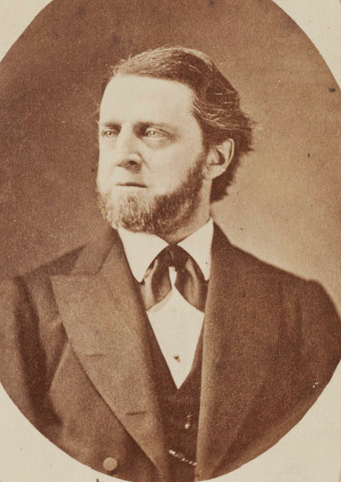

Speaker of the Massachusetts House of Representatives
- In office 1872–1875
- Preceded by: Harvey Jewell
- Succeeded by: John Davis Long

Member of the Massachusetts House of Representatives

9th Insurance Commissioner of Massachusetts
- In office June 29, 1866 – November 1, 1869
- Preceded by: George W. Sargent
- Succeeded by: Julius L. Clarke

Chairman of the Massachusetts Board of Railroad Commissioners

Personal details
- Born: November 22, 1830 Dennis, Massachusetts
- Died: October 11, 1907 (aged 76) Taunton, Massachusetts
- Party: Republican
- Spouse(s): Emily J. White, married December 10, 1856
- Education: Amherst College

John Elliot Sanford (November 22, 1830 – October 11, 1907) was a U.S. politician who served as the ninth Insurance Commissioner of Massachusetts from June 29, 1866, to November 1, 1869; as Chairman of the Massachusetts Board of Railroad Commissioners; and, from 1872 to 1875, as the Speaker of the Massachusetts House of Representatives.

== See also ==
- 93rd Massachusetts General Court (1872)
- 94th Massachusetts General Court (1873)
- 95th Massachusetts General Court (1874)
- 96th Massachusetts General Court (1875)

== Footnotes ==
Massachusetts House of Representatives
Preceded by Harvey Jewell	Speaker of the Massachusetts House of Representatives; 1872 — 1875	Succeeded by John Davis Long
Political offices
Preceded by George W. Sargent	9th Insurance Commissioner of Massachusetts; June 29, 1866–November 1, 1869	Succeeded by Julius L. Clarke
