= Adin Thayer (Massachusetts politician) =

Massachusetts politician (d. 1888)

Adin Thayer (died 1888) was a judge and politician in Massachusetts. He was a probate judge, and he served in the Massachusetts Senate in 1872. He was a Republican. He took his own life.

== See also ==
- 1872 Massachusetts legislature
