= Samuel Abbott Green =

American physician (1830–1918)

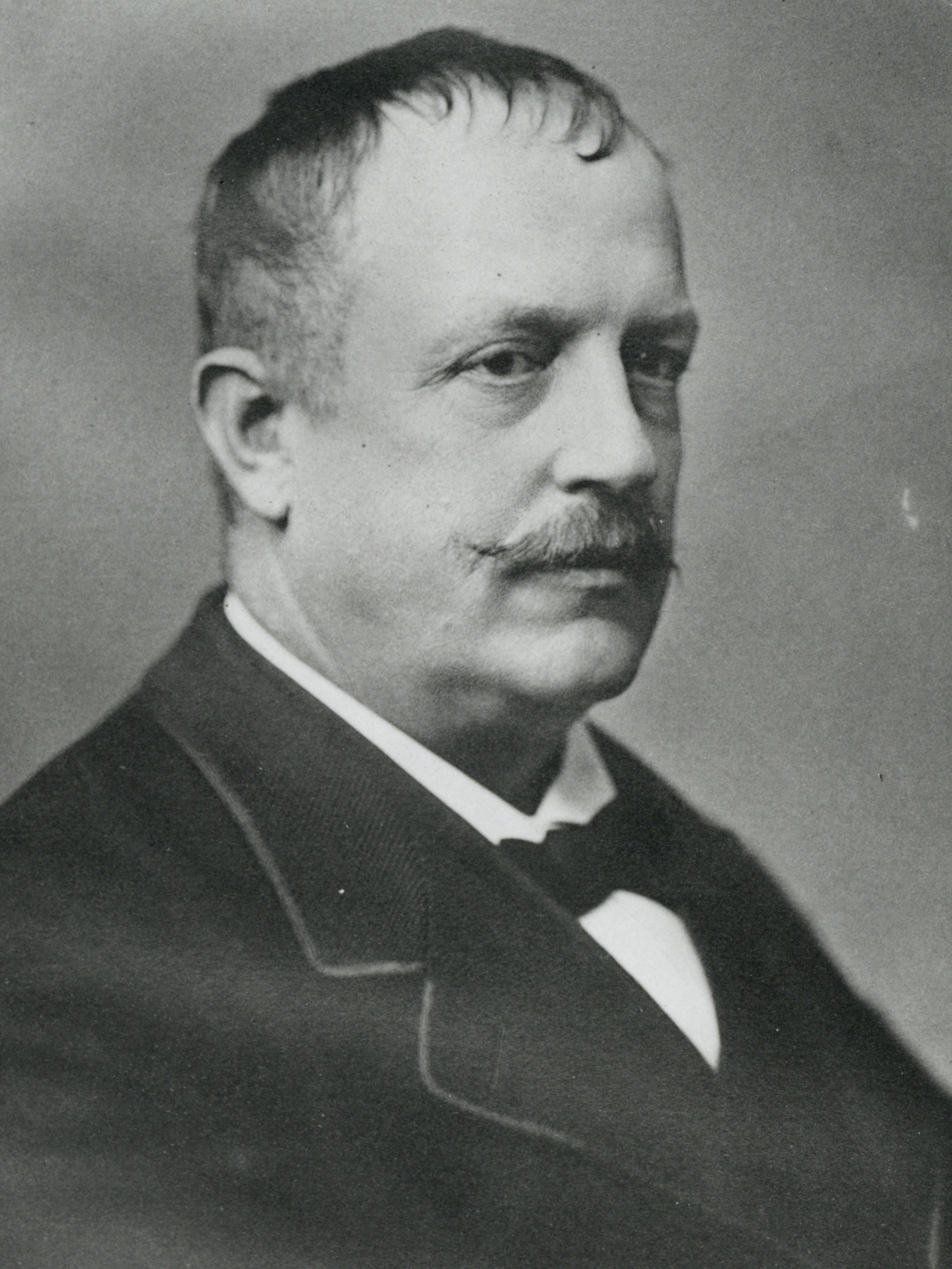

Mayor of Boston
- In office 1882
- Preceded by: Frederick O. Prince
- Succeeded by: Albert Palmer

Personal details
- Born: March 16, 1830 Groton, Massachusetts, U.S.
- Died: December 5, 1918 (aged 88) Boston, Massachusetts, U.S.
- Profession: physician

Samuel Abbott Green (March 16, 1830 – December 5, 1918) was an American physician-turned-politician from Massachusetts who served as a medical officer during the American Civil War and as mayor of Boston in 1882. He was an elected member of the American Philosophical Society.

== Early life ==
Green was born in Groton, Massachusetts, to Joshua Green and Eliza Lawrence. His grandfather, Samuel Lawrence was an officer in the American Revolutionary War, and his uncles Amos and Abbott Lawrence were prominent merchants, philanthropists, and politicians. Green graduated from the Lawrence Academy at Groton in 1847, and Harvard in 1851. Three years after his graduation, he received his medical degree from Harvard Medical School, having also studied at Jefferson Medical College. After this, he spent several years in Europe, studying in some of its best hospitals. On his return to the United States, he began a medical practice in Boston, and became one of the district physicians for the city dispensary. On May 19, 1858, he was appointed by Governor Banks surgeon of the 3rd Massachusetts Militia Regiment.

== Civil War service ==
At the beginning of the Civil War, Green was commissioned assistant surgeon of the 1st Massachusetts Volunteer Regiment, and was the first medical officer mustered in for three years' service. He was promoted surgeon of the 24th Massachusetts Regiment on September 2, 1861, where he remained until November 2, 1864, serving on the staffs of various cavalry officers. He had charge of the hospital ship Recruit for General Burnside's expedition to Roanoke Island. He commanded the hospital ship Cosmopolitan on the coast of South Carolina.

During the Second Battle of Fort Wagner, he was chief medical officer on Morris Island. In October 1863, he was sent to Florida, and was post surgeon at St. Augustine and Jacksonville; thence he was sent to Virginia and was with the army when Bermuda Hundred was taken. He was appointed acting staff surgeon and was stationed three months at Richmond after its fall. For gallant and distinguished services in the field, in 1864 he was brevetted lieutenant colonel of volunteers. Green organized Roanoke Cemetery in 1862, which was one of the first regular burial places for Union Army soldiers.

== Return to Boston ==
After the close of the war, Green was from 1865 until 1872 superintendent of the Boston Dispensary, a member of the Boston School Board 1860-1862 and 1866-1872, trustee of the Boston Public Library 1868-1878, and acting librarian from October 1877 to October 1878. In 1870 Governor Claflin appointed him one of a commission to care for disabled soldiers. In 1871 he became city physician of Boston, and retained the office till 1880. He was chosen a member of the board of experts authorized by congress in 1878 to investigate the yellow fever.

== Mayoralty ==
In 1881, he was elected mayor of Boston, but served only one term.

During his time in office, the three members of the Boston Police Commission were removed and liquor license receipts increased by $22,000.

His reelection campaign portrayed him as a man who listened and cared about the impoverished citizens within Boston. He lost the election by 2,138 votes to his predecessor, Democrat Albert Palmer.

== Historical studies ==
Green devoted much of his time to historical studies and was librarian of the Massachusetts Historical Society from 1868 until his death. He was also elected a member of the American Antiquarian Society in 1865, and served as its vice-president from 1904 to 1918. In addition to a large number of papers on scientific and historical subjects, Green published:

- My Campaigns in America: a Journal kept by Count William de Deux-Ponts, 1780-'1, translated from the French manuscript, with an introduction and notes (Boston, 1868)
- An Account of Percival and Ellen Green and of Some of their Descendants (printed privately, Groton, Massachusetts, 1876)
- Epitaphs from the Old Burying-Ground in Groton, Massachusetts (1879)
- The Early Records of Groton, Mass., 1662-1677 (1880)
- History of Medicine in Massachusetts, a centennial address delivered before the Massachusetts Medical Society at Cambridge, 7 June 1881 (Boston, 1881)
- Groton during the Indian Wars (Groton, 1883)
- Groton during the Witchcraft Times (1883)
- The Boundary-Lines of Old Groton (1885)
- The Geography of Groton, prepared for the use of the Appalachian Mountain Club (1886)
- "Groton Historical Series" (20 numbers, 1883-1887)

== Later life ==
Green was a tall and overweight man; he likely suffered from GERD and had an unpredictable temper. Late in his life he suffered a fall in the street where he broke his thigh, after which he used a wheelchair.

He died in Boston on December 5, 1918, at the age of 88. He was buried in his hometown of Groton.

== See also ==
- Timeline of Boston, 1880s

== Notes ==
Political offices
Preceded by Frederick O. Prince	Mayor of Boston, Massachusetts; 1882	Succeeded by Albert Palmer
