= Thomas W. Piper =

Canadian-born American murderer (1849–1876)

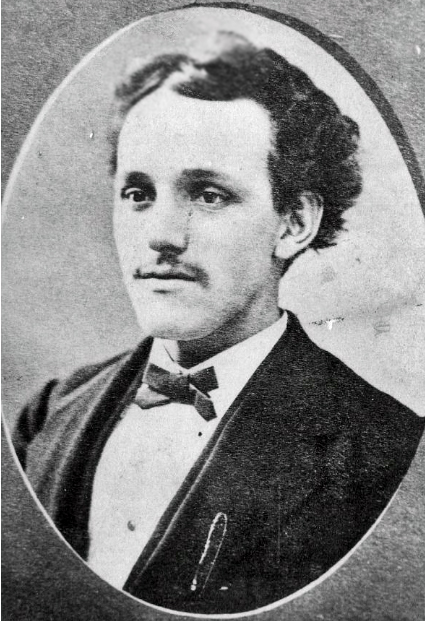
- Undated photograph of Piper
- Born: April 22, 1849; Yarmouth, Nova Scotia, Canada
- Died: May 26, 1876 (aged 27); Boston, Massachusetts, U.S.
- Cause of death: Execution by hanging
- Other names: The Boston Belfry Murderer; The Boston Woman-Killer; Piper the Murderer
- Conviction: First degree murder
- Penalty: Death

Details
- Victims: 2–3
- Span of crimes: 1873–1875
- Country: United States
- State: Massachusetts

Thomas W. Piper (April 22, 1849 – May 26, 1876), known as The Boston Belfry Murderer, was a Canadian-born American murderer who murdered two underage girls between 1873 and 1875 in Massachusetts and confessed to having done such to one other. He was subsequently hanged for his crimes.

== Biography ==
=== Early life ===
Originally from Nova Scotia, Piper was the second-born son of farmer T. C. Piper. Thomas worked as a carpenter on a farm his family owned, before moving with them to Boston in 1866, occasionally working for his father, but aspiring to do better things. Regarded as literate and clever, he had worked at several clerking jobs around the city and was an avid Baptist church-goer, which resulted in him being hired as a sexton for the Warren Avenue Baptist Church. Piper also had some sort of kidney disorder, which he "treated" with a secret addiction – using laudanum mixed with alcohol, which caused hallucinations. Unbeknownst to many, he started committing acts of arson before moving on to his first murder.

=== Murder of Bridget Landregan ===
On the night of December 5, 1873, while walking with two of his brothers to the church in Dorchester, Piper suddenly told them that he wasn't feeling well and wanted to go back home. He first went to a place which sold opium and mixed it with alcohol, drinking it all before returning to his house. He then took a saw and sawed off a piece of shaft, before exiting the house, walking around some and hiding under a fence. Soon after, a fire alarm was rung, and when the commotion quieted down, Piper was standing on the street with his brother when he noticed a young woman walking down the street – Bridget Landregan, a domestic servant of good repute who was returning to her mistress' home.

The brothers went inside the house, with Thomas claiming he was going to go to bed, but instead went down to the kitchen, grabbed the shaft and began walking after Landregan. He stalked her for some time until they reached Columbia Street, at which point Bridget noticed him. At that moment, Piper struck her with the shaft, causing her to fall down before hitting her again, breaking her skull and killing her.

Before he could do anything with the body, he noticed that a man was coming down the street, so he got up and began running. He climbed over a fence going along the railroad, taking a round-about way to his home, disposing of a knife that he thought could be recognised as his along the way.

Several arrests were made concerning the case, including Piper, but he was initially discharged due to lack of evidence. A former lover of Landregan, an Irishman named Thomas Cahill, was extradited from his home country after detectives wanted to question him. However, no evidence could link the murder to him, and Cahill soon returned to Ireland, where he himself was murdered.

=== Assault on Mary Tyner ===
In 1874, while visiting the downtown area of Boston, Piper met Tyner, a prostitute, on Lagrange Street. Both engaged in conversation, with Thomas inviting her to a saloon, to which Mary agreed. After they had some drinks together, Piper and Tyner went to her house, where they soon fell asleep. In the middle of the night, Thomas suddenly woke up and, noticing that his companion was asleep, he grabbed a hammer-like object and struck Tyner several times on the head with it.

He then promptly left the house by exiting through a window, opting to sleep in the church for the rest of the night. Although Tyner survived the attack, she was unable to identify her attacker, and was sent to live out her days as an inmate of a lunatic asylum. A former lover of hers named Colby was arrested, but later released due to lack of evidence.

=== Murder of Mabel H. Young ===
On May 23, 1875, a 5-year-old girl named Mabel Hood Young was attending a service in the Warren Avenue Baptist church, where Piper worked as a sexton. Thomas had taken a bat from the lower room, with the intention to kill somebody with it, up to the belfry. After the service ended, he sent away the boys playing in the vestibule, and lured the young Mabel to the tower with the promise of showing her the pigeons. When they went in there, Piper struck the young girl on the head with the bat a few times, causing her to fall down. Thomas intended to rape her, thinking that Young was dead, but when he realised she wasn't, he moved the badly-injured girl to another place, where she was soon found. Piper was arrested, but Mabel died from her injuries the following day.

== Trial and execution ==
Piper's first trial, prosecuted by Suffolk County District Attorney Oliver Stevens, ended in a hung jury, as he constantly protested his innocence, adding to the fact that there was no real reason or evidence to convict him in the case, resulting in nine voting for a conviction but three for an acquittal. In the second trial, headed by Attorney-General Charles R. Train, they managed to convict him with circumstantial evidence. Piper first appeared stoically indifferent in court, but began to look increasingly concerned on his way back to the cell.

He hastily began writing a letter addressed to his mother in which he wrote that he hoped he would be acquitted, but knew it wouldn't happen. Although this attempt at earning sympathy from the public was unsuccessful, prior to his conviction, his invented story of how Mabel was murdered was considered credible before he admitted it was false: initially, Piper claimed that he had wanted to show Mabel the pigeons, but the air was stuffy, and he decided to open up the window to let some fresh air in. He held it down with the bat and left for a moment, but when he returned, he noticed that the trapdoor had fallen on Young's head. Afraid of being accused of assault, Piper fled downstairs to tell a few of the women about the accident, but remained silent out of fear.

The motive for the crime was suggested as being pure lust for bloodshed and, under pressure from the whole ordeal, Piper confessed to Young's murder. To the shock of the Boston population, he confessed to other crimes as well, including the murder of Landregan, the arsons, the assault on Tyner and that he also murdered a girl named Minnie Sullivan. Although there wasn't enough evidence to convict him in the other cases, Piper was sentenced to death for the murder of Mabel Young.

He tried to appeal his sentence unsuccessfully. Piper's execution was attended by at least 300 people and he was executed by hanging on May 26, 1876, along with the "Petersham Murderer", Samuel J. Frost. His body was then privately buried at the Mount Hope Cemetery.

Following his execution, Piper's family asked that Thomas's written and detailed confession of the crimes, which was given to Sheriff John M. Clark, not be released to the public. Clark agreed with the plea, as the majority of Piper's crimes were already known to the public and nobody wanted to further horrors to the terrible deeds of the murderer.

== See also ==
- List of serial killers in the United States

== Bibliography ==
- Christopher Daley (2015). Murder & Mayhem in Boston: Historic Crimes in the Hub. Arcadia. ISBN 978-1625853066.
- Peter Vronsky (2018). Sons of Cain: A History of Serial Killers from the Stone Age to the Present. Penguin. ISBN 978-0698176140.
- Alan Rogers (2008). Murder and the Death Penalty in Massachusetts. University of Massachusetts Press. ISBN 978-1558496330.
- Robert Wilhelm (2017). Wicked Victorian Boston. Arcadia. ISBN 978-1439661710.
