= Carroll D. Wright =

American statistician and first US Commissioner of Labor (1885–1905)

Carroll Wright
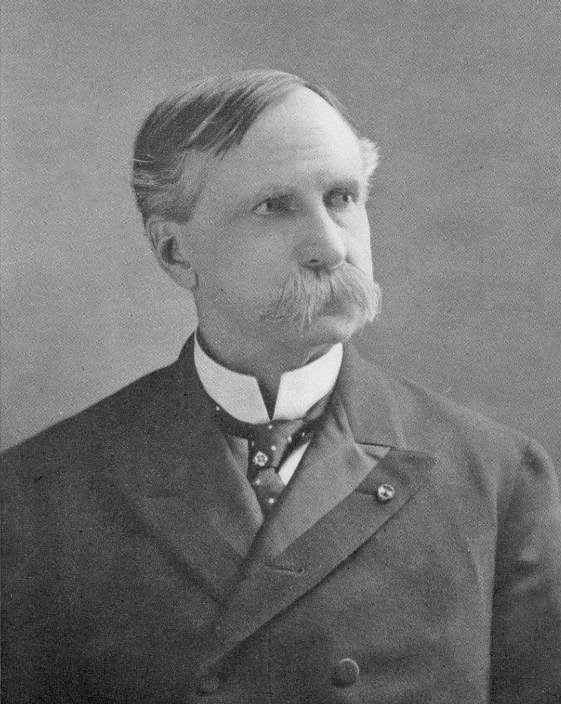

Commissioner of Labor Statistics
- In office January 1885 – January 1905
- President: Grover Cleveland; Benjamin Harrison; William McKinley; Theodore Roosevelt
- Preceded by: Office established
- Succeeded by: Charles P. Neill

Massachusetts Senate
- In office 1872 to 1873

Personal details
- Born: July 25, 1840 Dunbarton, New Hampshire, U.S.
- Died: February 20, 1909 (aged 68)

Carroll Davidson Wright (July 25, 1840 – February 20, 1909) was an American statistician. Wright is best known for his title as the first U.S. Commissioner of Labor, serving in that capacity from 1885 to 1905.

== Biography ==
Wright was born at Dunbarton, New Hampshire. He attended schools in Washington, New Hampshire, from elementary through the Tubbs Union Academy. He began to study law in 1860, first in Dedham, Massachusetts and then in nearby Boston, but in 1862 enlisted as a private in the 14th New Hampshire Volunteer Regiment to fight the American Civil War. He became colonel in 1864, and served as assistant-adjutant general of a brigade in the Shenandoah Valley campaign under General Philip Sheridan.

After the war, he was admitted to the New Hampshire bar, and in 1867 became a member of the Massachusetts and United States' bars. From 1872 to 1873 he served in the Massachusetts Senate, where he secured the passage of a bill to provide for the establishment of trains for workers to Boston from the suburban districts. From 1873 to 1878 he was chief of the Massachusetts Bureau of Statistics of Labor. In 1880, he was appointed supervisor of the U. S. Census in Massachusetts, being also special agent of the census on the factory system. In 1885 he was commissioned by the governor to investigate the public records of the towns, parishes, counties, and courts of the state.

Cover design for Wright's Some Ethical Phases of the Labor Question, published by the American Unitarian Association in 1902.

He was the first U.S. Commissioner of Labor from 1885 to 1905, and in 1893 was placed in charge of the Eleventh Census. Wright was elected a member of the American Antiquarian Society in 1893. In 1894 he was chairman of the commission which investigated the Pullman Strike of Chicago, and in 1902 was a member of the Anthracite Coal Strike Commission. He was honorary professor of social economics in the Catholic University of America from 1895 to 1904; in 1900, he became professor of statistics and social economics in Columbian University (now George Washington University).

From 1900 to 1901, he was university lecturer on wage statistics at Harvard, and in 1903 he was a member of the Douglas Commission to investigate and recommend a program of vocational education for Massachusetts. In 1902, he was chosen president of Clark College (the undergraduate school at Clark University), Worcester, Massachusetts, where he was also professor of statistics and social economics from 1904 until his death. Dr. Wright was President of the American Association for the Advancement of Science in 1903, and in 1907 received the Cross of the Legion of Honor for his work in improving industrial conditions, a similar honor (Order of Saints Maurizio e Lazzaro) having been conferred upon him in 1906 by the Italian government. He was a member of the Institute of France and an honorary member of the Imperial Academy of Science of Russia. In 1907, he was elected the second president of the National Society for the Promotion of Industrial Education. He received honorary degrees from Tufts (1883), Wesleyan (1894), Dartmouth (1897), Clark University (1902), Tufts (1902), and Amherst (1905). He died on February 20, 1909.

== Works ==
- Annual Reports of the Massachusetts Bureau of Statistics of Labor (15 vols., Boston, 1873–1888)
- The Census of Massachusetts. In three volumes. Boston: Albert J. Wright, State Printer, 1877. Vol. 2: Manufactures and Occupations, Vol. 3: Agricultural Products and Property
- Statistics of Drunkenness and Liquor Selling Under Prohibitory and License Legislation. Boston: Rand, Aberg & Co., 1879.
- The Statistics of Boston (1882)
- The Relation of Political Economy to the Labor Question (1882)
- The Factory System as an Element in Civilization (1882)
- Report on the Factory System of the United States. Washington, DC: Government Printing Office, 1884.
- Scientific Basis of Tariff Legislation (1884)
- History of Wages and Prices in Massachusetts, 1752–1883 (1885)
- Industrial Depressions: The First Annual Report of the United States Commissioner of Labor. Washington, DC: Government Printing Office, 1886.
- Convict Labor (1886)
- Strikes and Lockouts (1887)
- The Industrial Evolution of the United States (1887)
- The Present Actual Condition of the Workingman (1887)
- Hand Labor in Prisons (1887)
- Historical Sketch of the Knights of Labor (1887)
- The Study of Statistics in Colleges (1887)
- The Census of Massachusetts (4 vols., Boston, 1887/8)
- Problems of the Census (1887)
- The Growth and Purposes of Bureaus of Statistics of Labor (1888)
- Outline of Practical Sociology (1899)
- Some Ethical Phases of the Labor Question. Boston: American Unitarian Association, 1902.
- The Battles of Labor: Being the William Levi Bull Lectures for 1906. Philadelphia: George W. Jacobs & Co., 1906.
- The Apprenticeship System in its Relation to Industrial Education (1908)

== See also ==
- Bureau of Labor Statistics
- 1872 Massachusetts legislature
- 1873 Massachusetts legislature

Government offices
Preceded by Robert Percival Porter	Superintendent of the United States Census; 1893–1897	Succeeded by William Rush Merriam
