= Charles S. Wainwright =

Union Army artillery officer (1826–1907)

- Born: December 31, 1826; New York City
- Died: September 13, 1907 (aged 80); Washington, D.C.
- Burial place: Green-Wood Cemetery, Brooklyn, New York
- Military career
- Allegiance: United States of America; Union
- Branch: (United States) Union Army
- Service years: 1861–1865
- Rank: Colonel; Brevet Brigadier General
- Commands: 1st New York Light Artillery; Chief of Artillery, I Corps; Chief of Artillery, V Corps
- Conflicts: American Civil War; Battle of Antietam; Battle of Fredericksburg; Battle of Chancellorsville; Battle of Gettysburg; Mine Run Campaign; Overland Campaign; Siege of Petersburg; Appomattox Campaign
- Other work: Farmer and produce merchant

Charles Shiels Wainwright (December 31, 1826 – September 13, 1907) was a produce farmer in the state of New York and an artillery officer in the Union Army during the American Civil War. He played an important role in the defense of Cemetery Hill during the July 1863 Battle of Gettysburg, where his artillery helped repel a Confederate attack. His extensive diary kept during the war is considered to be among the finest such documents from the Civil War period.

== Early life ==
Wainwright was born December 31, 1826, in New York City, the brother of future doctor and Union general, William P. Wainwright. As a young man, he helped run his father's sprawling 320-acre (1.3 km^{2}) farm, "The Meadows," in the Hudson Valley, delivering produce to markets in the city. He was a prosperous farmer in 1860 when the census was taken. His residence was listed as Rhinebeck, New York.

He left behind an elderly father and two sisters when he joined the army in the early autumn of 1861 at the age of 34. His diary was begun on October 1 of that year.

== Civil War ==
Wainwright was commissioned a major in the 1st New York Artillery on October 17, 1861, and served throughout the war as an artillery officer in the Army of the Potomac. Early in his service, he was recorder of a board used to weed out unfit officers. He was present with his guns at the Battle of Antietam and the Battle of Fredericksburg. His batteries supported the attack of the Pennsylvania Reserves on the Confederate right flank at the latter battle.

Wainwright was chief of artillery of I Corps at the Battle of Chancellorsville. His actions in that battle were praised by the army's chief of artillery, Brig. Gen. Henry J. Hunt. He commanded the artillery brigade of the I Corps at the Battle of Gettysburg. During the struggle for control of Cemetery Hill on July 2, 1863, Wainwright commanded all the guns on the eastern part of the hill. His batteries were instrumental in helping repulse the twilight attack of the Louisiana Tigers, and they dueled with Confederate artillery the following day preceding Pickett's Charge.

When Maj. Gen. George G. Meade reorganized the Army of the Potomac in 1864, Wainwright became chief of artillery of V Corps, replacing Augustus P. Martin. He served in that role to the end of the war. Among his most successful actions was using guns to break a Confederate attack at the Battle of North Anna. He was promoted to brevet brigadier general on August 1, 1864.

He was the author of A Diary of Battle: The Personal Journals of Colonel Charles S. Wainwright, 1861–1865, published posthumously in 1962. His journals provide insights into the administration of the artillery, as well as its use in battle. Wainwright's observations on the Union commanders with whom he served are pungent. Maj. Gen. Gouverneur K. Warren, under whom he had served in V Corps, and Maj. Gen. Joseph Hooker receive particularly negative reviews.

== Post-war activities ==
After the war, Wainwright resided in Dutchess County, New York, in Europe and then in Washington, D.C. He belonged to the Metropolitan Club and the Sons of the American Revolution.

Wainwright died in Washington, D.C., on September 13, 1907, at the George Washington University Hospital. He was buried in Green-Wood Cemetery, Brooklyn. Wainwright died unmarried, and his brother inherited the manuscripts of the diary he kept during the war.
