= Augustus Pearl Martin =

American politician and soldier

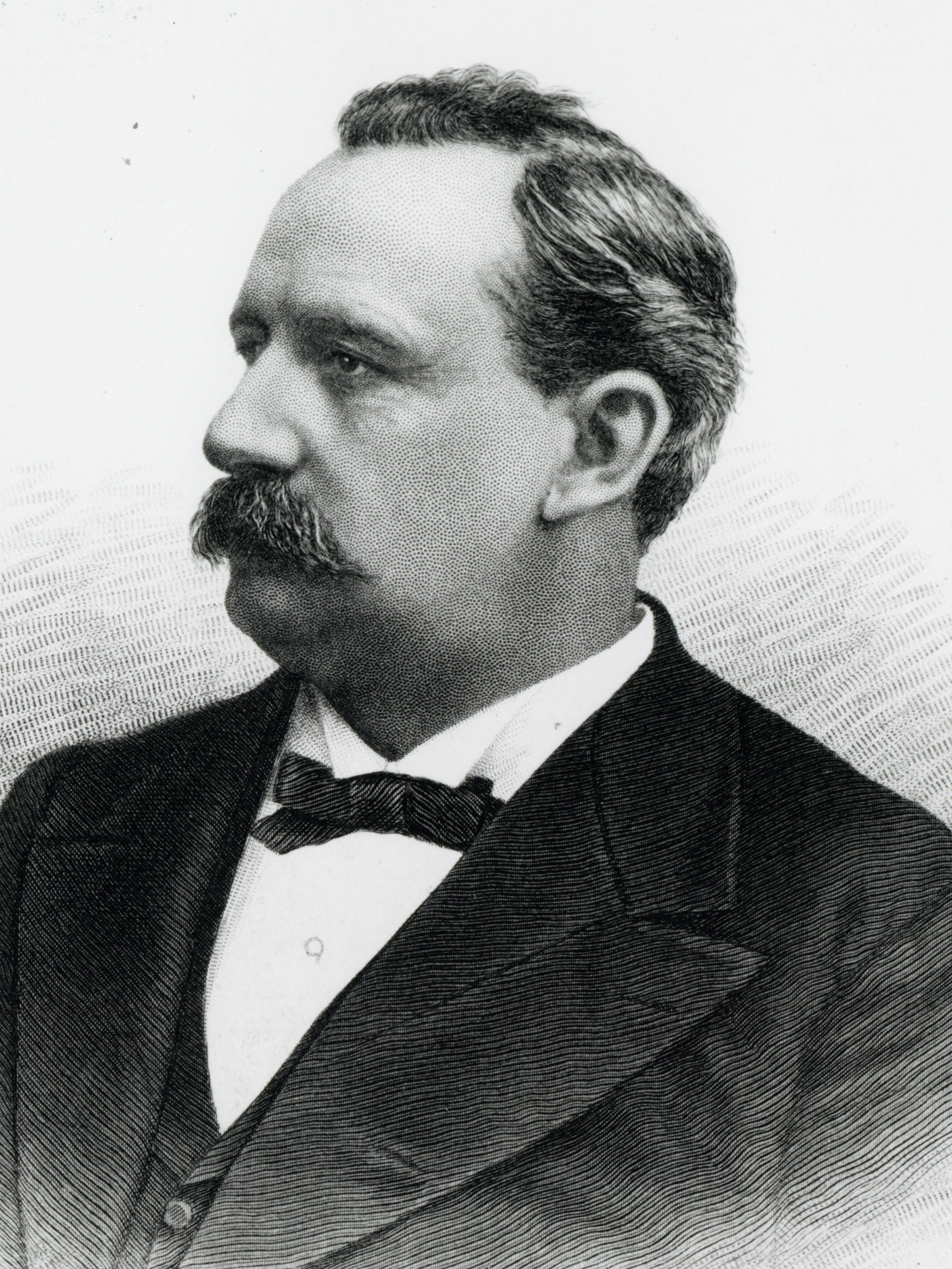

Mayor of Boston
- In office 1884
- Preceded by: Albert Palmer
- Succeeded by: Hugh O'Brien

Personal details
- Born: November 23, 1835 Abbot, Maine, U.S.
- Died: March 13, 1902 (aged 66) Dorchester, Massachusetts, U.S.
- Party: Citizens and Republican
- Spouse: Abbie Farmer
- Occupation: Military officer
- Profession: Leather trade
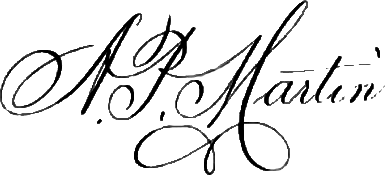
- Signature

Military service
- Allegiance: (United States) United States; Union
- Branch/service: United States Army; Union Army
- Rank: Captain
- Commands: 3rd Massachusetts Light Artillery
- Battles/wars: American Civil War: Battle of Gettysburg

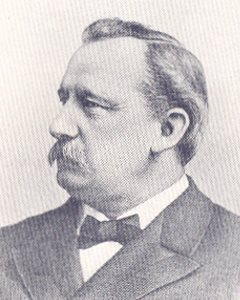
Sketch of Martin, circa 1884

Augustus Pearl Martin (November 23, 1835 – March 13, 1902) was an American politician and soldier from Massachusetts who served as the mayor of Boston, Massachusetts, in 1884. He also was a leading artillery officer in the Union Army during the American Civil War and was the leader of the state's Military Order of the Loyal Legion of the United States. He also served as a general in the Reconstruction era state militia.

== Biography ==
Martin was born in Abbot, Maine. He served as a lieutenant of the Boston Light Artillery militia company from 1858 until 1860. Following the outbreak of the Civil War, he was a sergeant with a three-month enlistment in 1861. He was commissioned subsequently as the first lieutenant of the 3rd Massachusetts Light Artillery on September 5, 1861, and as the battery's captain in November of same year. He was Chief of Artillery, George W. Morell's division of the Army of the Potomac through most of 1862. He was assigned to duty by Maj. Gen. George G. Meade as the commander of the artillery brigade of the V Corps in May 1863 and participated in the Chancellorsville and Gettysburg campaigns, as well as the Mine Run Campaign. Martin filed a detailed report on the artillery brigade's role in the Battle of Gettysburg.

During the consolidation and reorganization of the Army of the Potomac in early 1864, Martin reverted to command of the 3rd Massachusetts Light Artillery, serving in the artillery brigade of Charles S. Wainwright. Martin saw action at the Battle of the Wilderness and other engagements during that campaign, as well as during the Siege of Petersburg, Virginia. He was awarded a brevet commission as a colonel at the close of the war for gallant and meritorious services.

Martin was commander of the Ancient and Honorable Artillery Company in 1878. He was then the commander of the Massachusetts Commandery of MOLLUS in 1879 and 80. Martin was the chief marshal at the dedication of the monument on Boston Common September 17, 1877, as well as the chief marshal at the celebration of the 250th anniversary of the settlement of Boston on September 17, 1880. He was the senior aide-de-camp on the staff of Governor John Davis Long with the rank of brigadier general in 1882 and was a one-term mayor of Boston in 1884.

Martin died in Dorchester, Massachusetts, in 1902 and is interred at Mount Auburn Cemetery, Cambridge, Massachusetts.

== See also ==
- Timeline of Boston, 1880s
- 1883 Boston mayoral election
- 1884 Boston mayoral election

Political offices
Preceded by Albert Palmer	30th Mayor of Boston, Massachusetts; 1884	Succeeded by Hugh O'Brien
