= Dennis Bonner =

American politician (born 1964)

- Born: March 14, 1964 (age 61); Springfield, Missouri
- Occupations: Former politician, former legislator, US Army Veteran
- Known for: Democratic state legislator representing the 51st District, Missouri House of Representatives

Dennis Bonner (born 14 March 1964, Springfield, Missouri) is a former legislator, politician, and U.S Army veteran. He was elected as a Democratic state legislator representing the 51st District in the Missouri House of Representatives from January 1995 through January 2003. He practiced law, first in partnership with Ralph Monaco, and then in his own private practice in Lee's Summit, Missouri.

== Education ==
From his 1998 legislator's biography: "Rep. Bonner is a 1982 graduate of William Chrisman High School in Independence. He received a bachelor of arts degree in history in 1992 from the University of Missouri–Kansas City, and a master's degree in public administration in 1994 from the Bloch School of Business, also at the University of Missouri–Kansas City... "

Bonner received a Juris Doctor degree from the University of Missouri–Kansas City School of Law.

== Career ==
With his district and constituents mainly in Independence, Missouri and parts of Kansas City, Missouri and adjoining communities, Bonner's tenure as legislator was marked by his "bucking the tide" and voting or speaking his conscience and the voice of his constituency even when in opposition to the party's leadership in the state's Capitol, Jefferson City, Missouri. Immediately branded a "renegade", Bonner was expelled from the Democratic Caucus in February 1995 just one month after being sworn in, for refusing to vote for an unprecedented eighth term for Speaker of the House Bob F. Griffin. "He's got to go", Bonner said [at the time]. "Under Bob Griffin's style of government, the caucus is his circus. It's not an open body where you can discuss issues. He never will be challenged." Mr. Griffin later pleaded guilty to Federal corruption charges in 1998, and his sentence was commuted by U.S. President Bill Clinton in 2001.

Bonner later served as Chairman of the House Appropriations Committee for General Administration, as vice-chairman of the Commerce Committee, and was a member of the House Budget Committee. He was the primary sponsor of "Jake's Law", passed into law in 2001, which requires warrant checks on all individuals being released from jail.

From his 1998 legislator's biography: " ... He is a U.S. Army veteran, and served as a member of the Missouri Army National Guard, holding the rank of Sergeant First Class (E-7)..."

Bonner was admitted to the Missouri Bar Association. As of May 25, 2016, he is listed as "inactive" which the association defines as attorneys who are "in good standing with the Supreme Court of Missouri but are not eligible to practice law in Missouri."

== Disbarment ==
"Bonner, who had a solo practice, admitted to violating five rules of professional conduct for attorneys and filed a motion with the court to voluntarily surrender his license to practice law in Missouri. Bonner was under investigation for mishandling his client's personal injury settlement funds.

The court cited 10 examples of Bonner delaying payments for one client until he got a new settlement from another, then using the money to repay the first client. The court also cited six examples of Bonner misappropriating about $55,000 in third-party funds that were designated for medical bills and other expenses and now not having the means to repay the money.

Bonner initially argued that he should be able to keep his law license so he could continue working to repay the money he owed, but the court disagreed and suspended his license pending a hearing on the disciplinary charges. He has now been disbarred."
