= 1873 Massachusetts legislature =

Parliamentary body

94th Massachusetts General Court
←	93rd	95th	→

Overview
- Legislative body: General Court
- Election: November 5, 1872

Senate
- Members: 40
- President: George B. Loring
- Party control: Republican (39 R, 1 D)

House
- Members: 240
- Speaker: John E. Sanford
- Party control: Republican (211 R, 24 D, 5 other)

Sessions
- 1st: January 1, 1873 – June 12, 1873

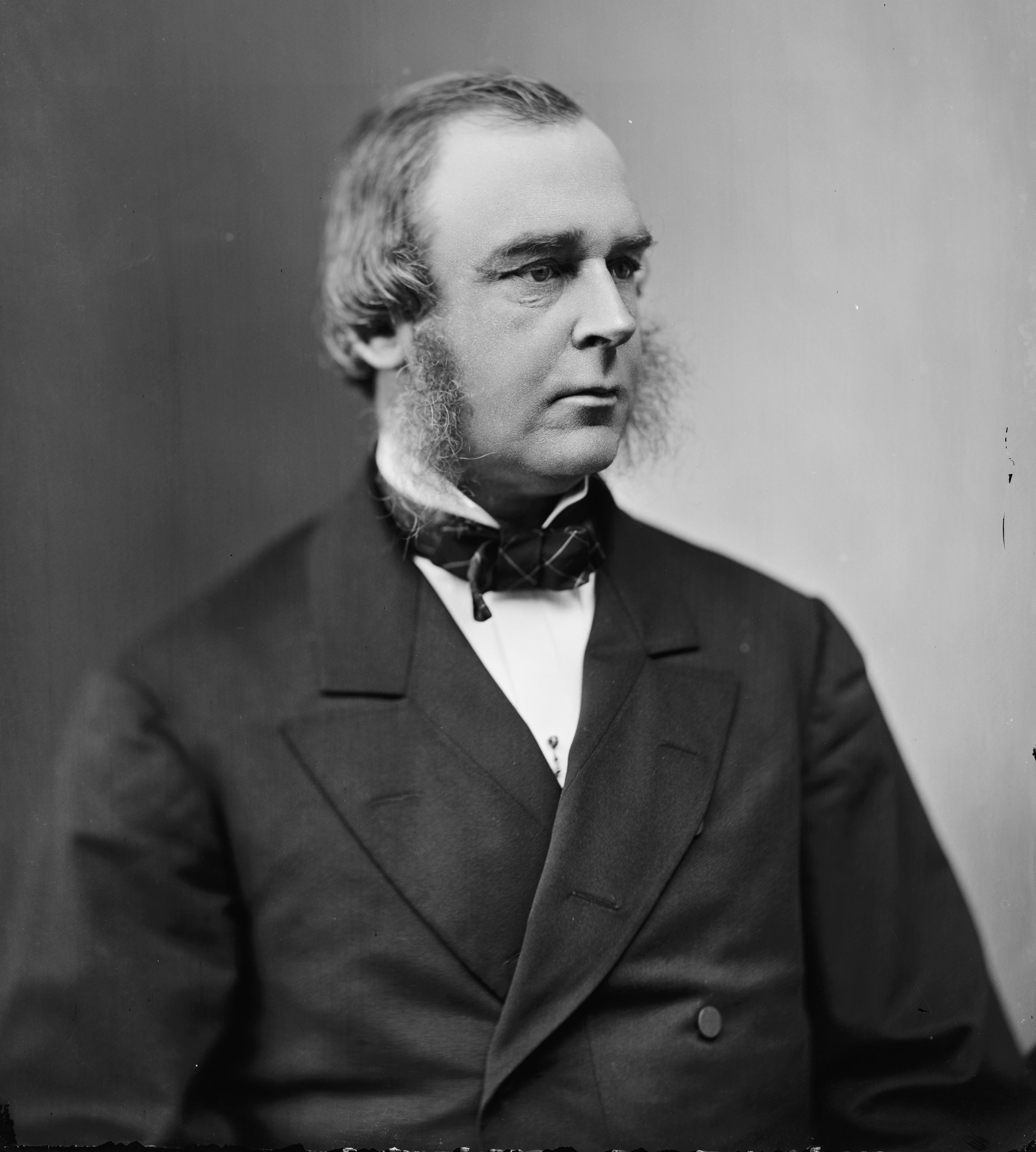
George Loring, Senate president.

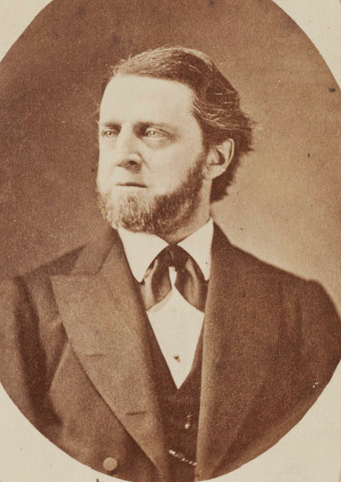
John Sanford, House speaker.

Leaders of the Massachusetts General Court, 1873.

The 94th Massachusetts General Court, consisting of the Massachusetts Senate and the Massachusetts House of Representatives, met in 1873 during the governorship of Republican William B. Washburn. George B. Loring served as president of the Senate and John E. Sanford served as speaker of the House.

== Senators ==
Image	Name	Date of birth	District	Party
	Prentiss Chaffee Baird	1832		
	Joseph Kelley Baker	1827		
	Henry Lewis Bancroft	1821		
	Julius Kirkland Banister	1833		
	James Brown	1828		
	Erastus Payson Carpenter	November 23, 1822		
	Jeremiah Clark	1819		
	Isaac Henry Coe	1818		
	Jedediah Dwelley	1834		
	Charles Howe French	1814		
	Robert Oliver Fuller	1829		
	Newell Giles	1818		
	Martin Griffin	1825		
	Samuel Moulton Griggs	1822		
	Nathan Williams Harmon	1813		
	Francis Wayland Jacobs	1837		
	Nathaniel Lafayette Johnson	1822		
	Robert Johnson	1823		
	Edward Lawrence	1810		
	William Henry Learnard	1828		
	Edward Learned	1820		
	George Walter Lobdell	1823		
	George B. Loring	November 8, 1817		
	Moody Merrill	1836		
	Newton Morse	1832		
	Francis Augustus Nye	1823		
	Timothy Fairbanks Packard	1812		
	Lloyd Parsons	1816		
	Joseph Samson Potter	1822		
	Charles Pickett Stickney	1824		
	George Franklin Thompson	1827		
	John Douglas Todd	1814		
	George Arnold Torrey	1838		
	Levi Wallace	1831		
	Henry Stevenson Washburn	1813		
	William Whiting II	May 24, 1841		
	George Danforth Whittle	1838		
	Rufus Dodd Woods	1818		
	David Titcomb Woodwell	1820		
	Carroll D. Wright	July 25, 1840		

== Representatives ==
image	Name	Date of birth	District	Party
	John Henry Abbott	1825		
	Wales Aldrich	1811		
	Francis Roberts Allen	1817		
	Walter Brown Allen	1828		
	Arlon Sabin Atherton	1842	Franklin county No. 1	
	Horace Clinton Bacon	1824		
	Aaron Bagg	1810		
	Andrew Jackson Bailey	1840		
	Nahum Bailey	1823		
	William Baker	1821		
	George Washington Bardwell	1836	Franklin county No. 4	
	James Madison Barker	1839		
	George Bartholmesz	1821		
	John Mason Batchelder	1832		
	Elijah Eastman Belding	1813	Franklin county No. 3	
	Ezekiel Dodge Bement	1819	Franklin county No. 5	
	Austin Williams Benton	1818		
	Edward Adams Berdge	1829		
	Hiram Berry	1820		
	Edward Lyman Bigelow	1839		
	John Bigelow	1841		
	Sanford Waters Billings	1834		
	William Rufus Black	August 23, 1830		
	George Baylis Blake	1823		
	Peleg Blankinship	1809		
	William Edward Blunt	1840		
	Dennis Bonner	1821		
	Franklin Bonney	1822		
	Horace Leander Bowker	1832		
	James William Bradley	1828		
	Bowman Bigelow Breed	1832		
	Richard Francis Briggs	1836		
	Richard Britton	1838		
	Giles Edwin Brownell	1819		
	Moses Loring Buck	1811		
	William Henry Buck	1818		
	Addison Burnett	1810		
	Henry Burt	1811		
	Jacob Brown Calley	1823		
	Adam Capen	1821		
	Charles Victor Carpenter	1830		
	Sumner Carruth	December 22, 1834		
	Henry Bedell Chamberlin	1839		
	Edward Whitman Chapin	1840		
	Elijah Horne Chisholm	1824		
	Albe Cady Clark	1826		
	Francis Warren Clark	1829		
	George Washington Clark	1836		
	Alfred Alonzo Clatur	1835		
	Charles Russell Codman	1829		
	John Bear Doane Cogswell	June 6, 1829		
	John Swain Coney	1823		
	William Henry Cook	March 17, 1842		
	George Copeland	1837		
	Robert Couch	1817		
	William Augustus Cressy	1820		
	Charles Crittenden	1837	Franklin county No. 4	
	George Glover Crocker	1843		
	Daniel Aloysius Cronin	1846		
	Joseph Warren Cross	1808		
	John Cummings	1812		
	Benjamin Connor Currier	1822		
	John Cushing	1808		
	William Frank Darby	1838		
	George Edmund Davis	1827		
	Joshua Wingate Davis	November 13, 1817		
	George Jackson Dean	1828		
	William Dean	1830		
	Isaac Walker Derby	1835		
	Seymour Boughton Dewey	1814		
	Lewis J. Dudley	November 11, 1815		
	Joseph Dyer	1830		
	Henderson Josiah Edwards	1840		
	Frederick David Ely	September 24, 1838		
	Alonzo Hathaway Evans	February 24, 1820		
	George Otis Fairbanks	1815		
	Caleb Clesson Field	1810		
	Harrison Otis Field	1810		
	John Hancock Fisher	1807		
	Eustace Carey Fitz	1833		
	John Edward Fitzgerald	1844		
	Thomas Francis Fitzgerald	1848		
	Daniel Coolidge Fletcher	1829		
	John Ware Fletcher	1824		
	Granville Edward Foss	August 16, 1842		
	Hiram Munroe French	1827		
	William Frost	1822		
	Kirke Edwin Gardner	1833		
	John Gates	1807		
	Addison Gilbert	1808		
	Charles Albert Gleason	1846		
	Asa Holland Goddard	1807		
	Stephen Dwight Goddard	1811		
	Andrew Jackson Gove	1834		
	Brownell Granger	1835		
	Fitz Edward Griffin	1840		
	Isaac Dennis Hall	1807		
	John Wilkes Hammond	1837		
	Charles Veranus Hanson	1844		
	Simon Hardy	1833		
	George Henry Harlow	1820		
	David Phillips Hatch	1814		
	Austin Hawley	1822		
	Lewis Hayden	December 2, 1811		
	Benjamin Franklin Hayes	July 3, 1835		
	Francis Brown Hayes	1819		
	Samuel Stone Haynes	1822		
	Benjamin Heath	1821		
	Samuel William Heath	1804		
	Lot Higgins	1809		
	Samuel Eldridge Hildreth	1829		
	Amos Hill	1830		
	Henry Bozyol Hill	1823		
	John Warren Hollis	1812		
	Charles Jarvis Holmes	1834		
	Lewis Holmes	1806		
	Samuel Bugbee Hopkins	1823		
	Emory Adams Howard	1837		
	David Porter Howes	1815		
	George Henry Hoyt	November 25, 1837		
	Barney Hull	1830		
	Richard Hales Humphrey	1829		
	Ebenezer Atherton Hunt	January 26, 1826		
	Thomas Prentiss Hurlbut	1820		
	Richardson Hutchinson	1818		
	Alexis W. Ide	1826		
	Thomas Ingalls	1824		
	Nathan Sumner Jenkins	1820		
	Jonathan Johnson	1818		
	Edward Jenkins Jones	1822		
	Thomas Milton Judd	1840		
	Jesse Edson Keith	1824		
	George Perry Kendrick	1824		
	William Reed Kentfield	1814		
	Lucius Woodman Knight	1830		
	Charles Rensselaer Ladd	April 9, 1822		
	Noah Davis Ladd	1820		
	Almond Ring Lancaster	1829		
	George Young Learned	1827		
	Willard Lewis	1808		
	William Hamilton Loughlin	1847		
	George A. Marden	August 9, 1839		
	Elijah Marion	1812		
	Albert Mason	1836		
	David Mayhew	1834		
	Edward McCleave	November 1, 1813		
	Samuel Walton McDaniel	1833		
	John Brooks Moore	1817		
	Thomas Jones Morgan	1823		
	Charles William Morrill	1839		
	Asa Porter Morse	1818		
	Charles Dimock Morse	1827		
	Andrew Marathon Morton	1839		
	Lewis Rufus Norton	1821		
	John Adams Nowell	1817		
	Edward Ornan Noyes	1840		
	Weaver Osborn	1815		
	Hiram Packard	1816		
	Liberty Dodge Packard	1831		
	Albert Palmer	January 17, 1831		
	John Barnard Parker	1812		
	William Crowell Parker	1850		
	Daniel Augustus Patch	1832		
	John Winslow Peirce	1835		
	John Perkins	1825		
	Charles Perley	1823		
	Henry Willis Phelps	1830		
	Calvin Tilden Phillips	1836		
	Willard Peele Phillips	1825		
	William Caldwell Plunkett	October 23, 1799		
	Francis Edward Porter	1824		
	Rodolphus Porter	1834		
	George Purrington	1829		
	Joseph Henry Read	1835		
	John Warren Regan	1833		
	William Roberts	1835		
	Philip Henry Robinson	1823		
	George Thomas Ryder	1827		
	Stephen Decatur Salmon	1845		
	John Samson	1821		
	George Sanborn	1816		
	Edward Sanford	1825		
	John Eliot Sanford	November 22, 1830		
	George Jedediah Sanger	1826		
	Joseph Leonard Sargent	1829		
	Amos Joseph Saunders	1826		
	Isaac Fessenden Sawtelle	August 1, 1816		
	Augustus Jonathan Sawyer	1816		
	Roger Henry Scannell	1837		
	John Cleveland Scott	1816		
	Nathaniel Sears	1825		
	Nathan Beebe Seaver	1822		
	Robert Seaver	1812		
	Henry Perkins Shattuck	1844		
	James Bayard Shaw	1837		
	John Shaw	1822		
	Amos Wight Shumway	1819		
	Henry Clinton Skinner	1824		
	James Smith	1831		
	Joshua Bowen Smith	1813		
	Zoeth Snow	1825		
	Augustus Lord Soule	April 19, 1827		
	Reuben Goodspeed Sparks	1822		
	Henry Splaine	1837		
	Franklin Harvey Sprague	1825		
	Oliver Martin Stacey	1816		
	Francis Dana Stedman	1801		
	James Aaron Stetson	1806		
	William Stewart	1820	Franklin county No. 3	
	Thomas Newcomb Stone	1818		
	William B. Stone	January 24, 1811		
	John Henry Studley	1828		
	Andrew Hodges Sweet	October 2, 1845		
	Charles Talbot	1811		
	James Gamage Tarr	July 6, 1830		
	William Taylor	1831		
	Eliphalet Loring Thayer	1824		
	Joseph Augustus Titus	1838		
	Hugh James Toland	1844		
	Marcus Truesdell	1813		
	Quincy Adams Vinal	1826		
	William Nathaniel Walker	1823		
	Rodney Wallace	December 21, 1823		
	Andrew Jackson Waters	1837		
	Edward Fox Watson	1807		
	Timothy W. Wellington	1811		
	James Lyman White	1821		
	Tisdale Sanford White	1809		
	William Henry Whitfield	November 11, 1804		
	George Henry Whitman	1808		
	Austin Whitney	1817		
	Robert Rich Wiley	1828		
	Henry Warren Wilson	1834		
	Benjamin Franklin Wing	October 22, 1822		
	Ezra Dyer Winslow	1839		
	Samuel Winslow	1827		
	Oliver Wolcott	1827		
	Moses Davis Woodbury	1821		
	Elijah Nichols Woods	1818		

== See also ==
- 43rd United States Congress
- List of Massachusetts General Courts
