= Albert Palmer (American politician) =

American politician

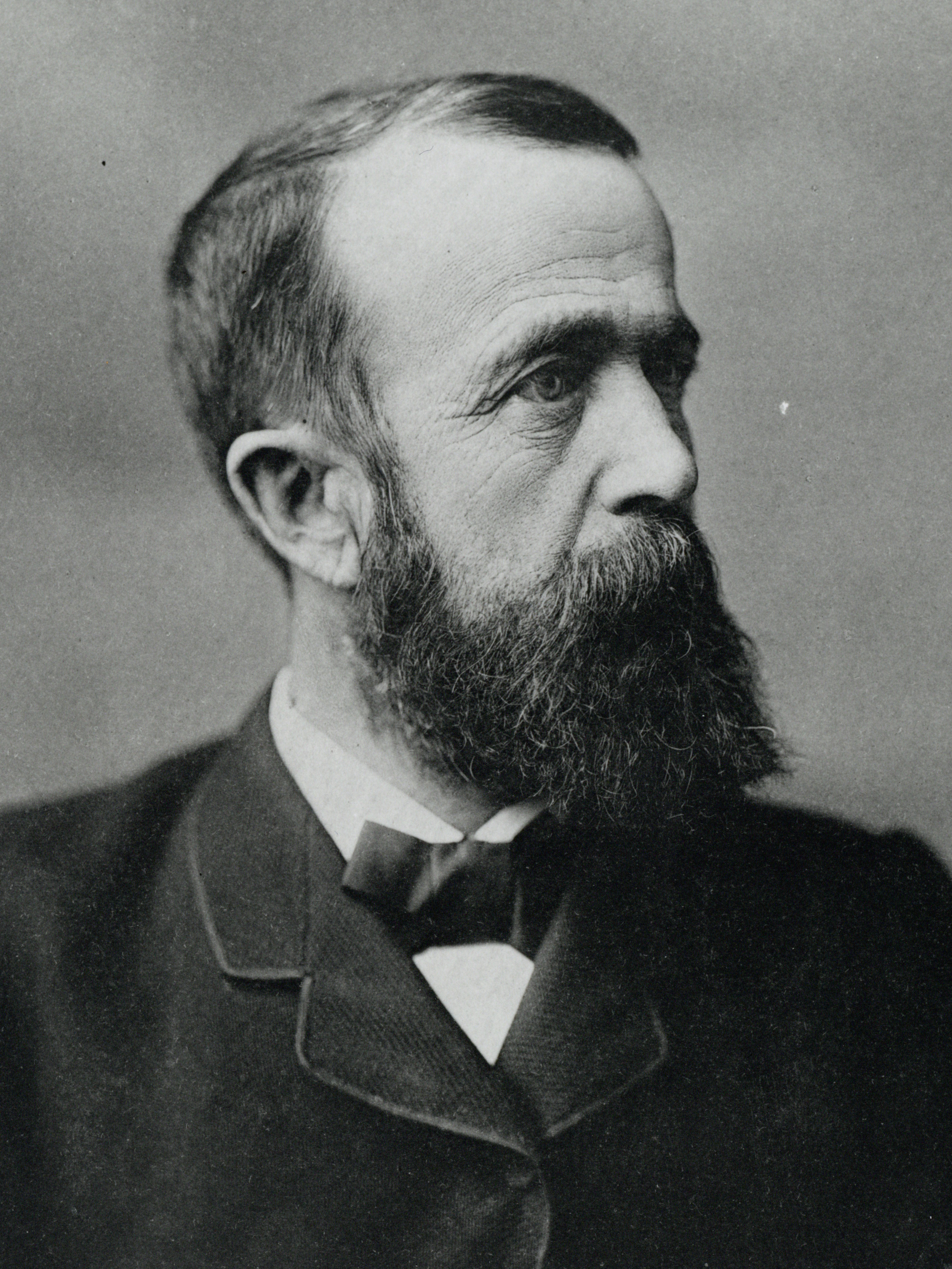

Mayor of Boston
- In office January 1, 1883 – January 7, 1884
- Preceded by: Samuel Abbott Green
- Succeeded by: Augustus Pearl Martin

Member of the Massachusetts State Senate
- In office 1875–1879
- Preceded by: Moody Merrill
- Succeeded by: Nathaniel Wales

Member of the Massachusetts House of Representatives First Norfolk District
- In office 1872–1874

Personal details
- Born: January 17, 1831 Candia, New Hampshire, U.S.
- Died: May 21, 1887 (aged 56)
- Party: Republican to 1879, Democratic
- Spouse: Martha Ann Newell
- Children: Joseph Newell Palmer, born January 1, 1865; Wilson Newell Palmer, born July 7, 1867.
- Education: Dartmouth College
- Profession: Schoolteacher; Ice business

Albert Palmer (January 17, 1831 – May 21, 1887) was an American schoolteacher, businessman, and politician from Candia New Hampshire, and Boston, Massachusetts, who served as mayor of Boston from January 1, 1883, to January 7, 1884.

== Early life ==
Palmer was born in Candia, New Hampshire, he was the seventh of eleven children born to farmers Joseph and Abigail Palmer.

Palmer received his high school diploma from Phillips Exeter Academy, and his college degree from Dartmouth College, from which he graduated second in his class in 1858.

Palmer taught at Boston Latin School, and in the schools of West Cambridge, Massachusetts.

== Family ==
Palmer married Martha Ann Newell, they had two children: Joseph Newell Palmer (born January 1, 1865) and Wilson Newell Palmer (born July 7, 1867).

== Business career ==
After he left teaching Palmer was engaged in the ice business in Boston with Nathan B. Prescott. under the name Prescott and Palmer. In 1872 the Jamaica Pond Ice Company was formed from the amalgamation of the Prescott and Palmer Ice Company and three other firms. Palmer served as the treasure and later president of the Jamaica Pond Ice Company.

== Early political career ==
In 1872 Palmer was elected to the Massachusetts State House of Representatives, serving until 1874. He acted as the chairman on the Joint Committee on Railroads.

He later served in the Massachusetts State Senate from 1875 to 1879 and was the chairman on the Committee for Federal Relations.

He exited the Republican Party in 1879 and became a supporter of Major General Benjamin Butler.

== Mayoralty ==
In the 1881 mayoral election Palmer was defeated by Dr. Samuel A. Green.

In the Boston city election held on December 12, 1882, Palmer was elected Mayor, with a majority of 2,187 votes over Dr. Samuel A. Green, the candidate of the Republican and Citizens parties.

His efforts as mayor led to the foundation of Franklin Park.

== Family ==
Palmer married Martha Ann Newell, they had two children Joseph Newell Palmer, born January 1, 1865 and Wilson Newell Palmer, born July 7, 1867.

== Death ==
Palmer died on May 21, 1887, at the age of 56.

== See also ==
- 1872 Massachusetts legislature
- 1873 Massachusetts legislature
- 1874 Massachusetts legislature
- 1875 Massachusetts legislature
- 1876 Massachusetts legislature
- 1878 Massachusetts legislature
- Timeline of Boston, 1880s

== End notes ==
Political offices
Preceded by Samuel Green	29th Mayor of Boston, Massachusetts; 1883	Succeeded by Augustus Pearl Martin
