= Ebenezer Atherton Hunt =

American politician

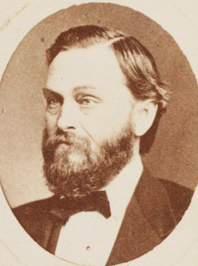

Member of the Massachusetts House of Representatives for the 8th Norfolk County District
- Incumbent
- Assumed office 1873

Member of the Massachusetts Senate for Norfolk and Plymouth Counties
- Incumbent
- Assumed office 1875

Personal details
- Born: January 26, 1826 Weymouth, Massachusetts, United States
- Died: March 17, 1891 (aged 65) Weymouth, Massachusetts
- Resting place: Weymouth Village Cemetery
- Occupation: Shoe manufacturer, Politician

Ebenezer Atherton Hunt (January 26, 1826 - March 17, 1891) was an American politician from Weymouth, Massachusetts, who served in the Massachusetts House of Representatives, after being elected to the 94th Massachusetts General Court in 1872. He represented the eighth district of Norfolk County, Massachusetts. He was elected to the Massachusetts Senate for two terms, representing Norfolk and Plymouth counties, serving in the 96th Massachusetts General Court, and the 97th Massachusetts General Court.

== Personal ==
Hunt was born in Weymouth, Massachusetts who became a shoe manufacturer, prior to entering politics at a state level.

His father, Atherton Nash Hunt (1802 –1865) was the son of Captain Ebenezer Hunt. His mother was Susannah C. Hobart (1803–1886), from Quincy, Massachusetts.

Hunt married Louisa Ann Follett (1834-1900), from Quincy, Massachusetts, the daughter of George Follett and Betsey Hobart on November 23, 1851.

Hunt died on March 17, 1891, and was buried in the village cemetery in Weymouth, Massachusetts. Now known as the Front Street Historic District.

== See also ==
- 1873 Massachusetts legislature
- 1875 Massachusetts legislature
- 1876 Massachusetts legislature
