= 1880 Massachusetts gubernatorial election =

- November 2, 1880
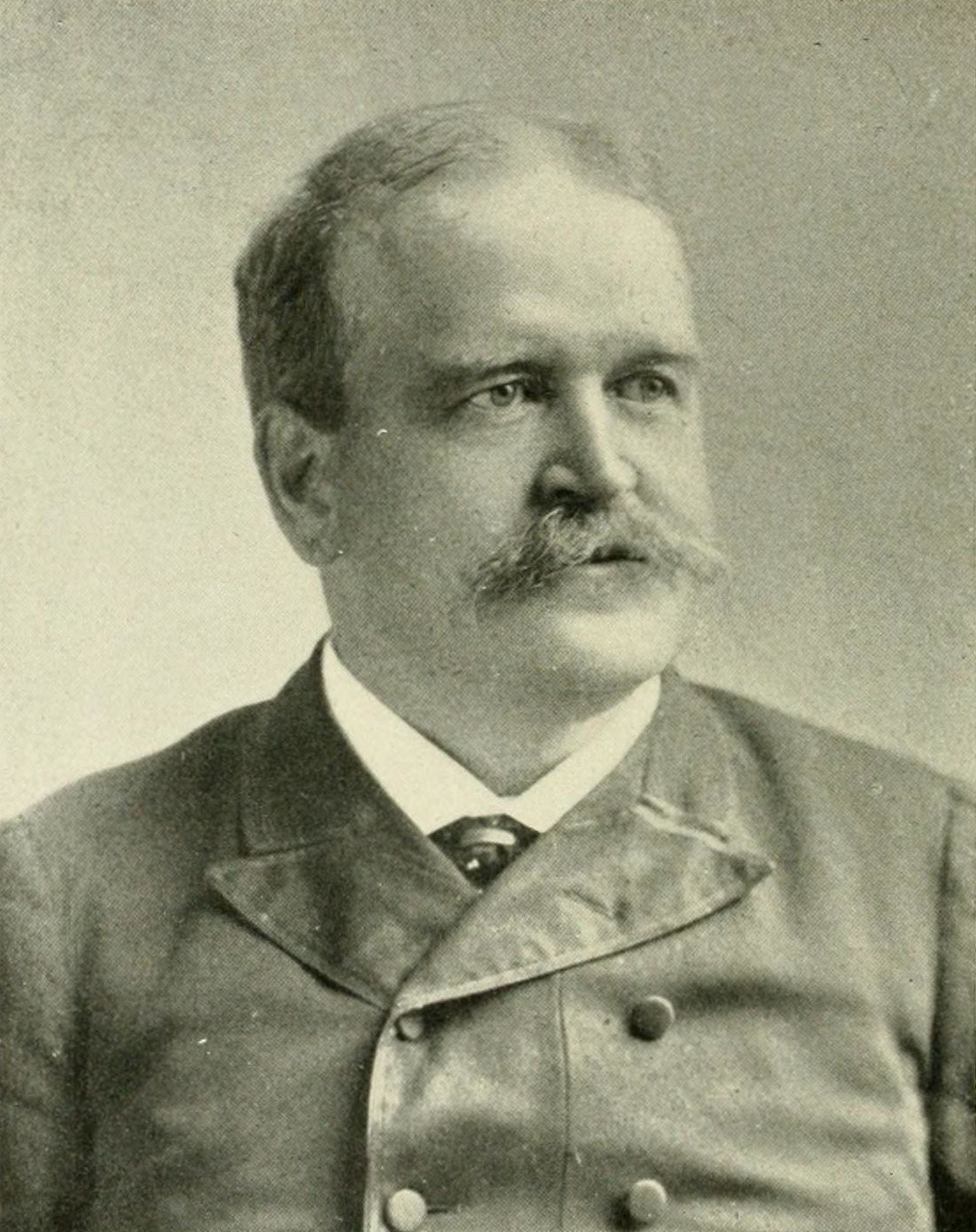

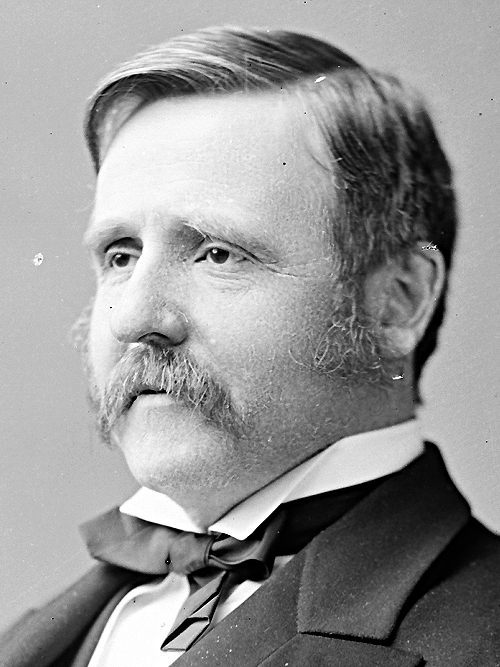
Nominee	John Davis Long	Charles Perkins Thompson
Party	Republican	Democratic
Popular vote	164,926	111,410
Percentage	58.41%	39.46%
- Long: 40-50% 50–60% 60–70% 70–80% 80–90% >90% Thompson: 40-50% 50–60% 60–70%
Governor before election
John Davis Long
Republican
Elected Governor
John Davis Long
Republican

The 1880 Massachusetts gubernatorial election was held on November 2.

== Governor ==
Massachusetts gubernatorial election, 1880
Party	Candidate	Votes	%	±%
Republican	John Davis Long (incumbent)	164,926	58.41%	
Democratic	Charles Perkins Thompson	111,410	39.46%	
Greenback	Horace Binney Sargent	4,864	1.72%	
Prohibition	Charles Almy	1,059	0.38%	
Others	Others	87	0.03%	
Republican hold		Swing		

== Lt. governor ==
Massachusetts lt. gubernatorial election, 1880
Party	Candidate	Votes	%	±%
Republican	Byron Weston (incumbent)	164,872	58.59%	
Democratic	Alpha E. Thompson	110,598	39.30%	
Greenback	George Dutton	4,717	1.68%	
Prohibition	Timothy K. Earle	1,190	0.42%	
Others	Others	43	0.02%	
Republican hold		Swing		

== See also ==
- 1880 Massachusetts legislature
