= Senator Livingston (disambiguation) =

Edward Livingston (1764–1836) was a U.S. Senator from Louisiana from 1829 to 1831. Senator Livingston may also refer to:

- Charles L. Livingston (1800–1873), New York State Senate
- David Livingston (politician) (fl. 2010s), Arizona State Senate
- Edward Philip Livingston (1779–1843), New York State Senate
- Henry A. Livingston (1776–1849), New York State Senate
- Jacob H. Livingston (1896–1950), New York State Senate
- Leonidas F. Livingston (1832–1912), Georgia State Senate
- Peter R. Livingston (politician, born 1766) (1766–1847), New York State Senate
- Philip Livingston (1716–1778), New York State Senate
- Steve Livingston (fl. 2010s), Alabama State Senate
- William E. Livingston (1832–1919), Massachusetts State Senate
