= 1881 Massachusetts gubernatorial election =

- November 8, 1881
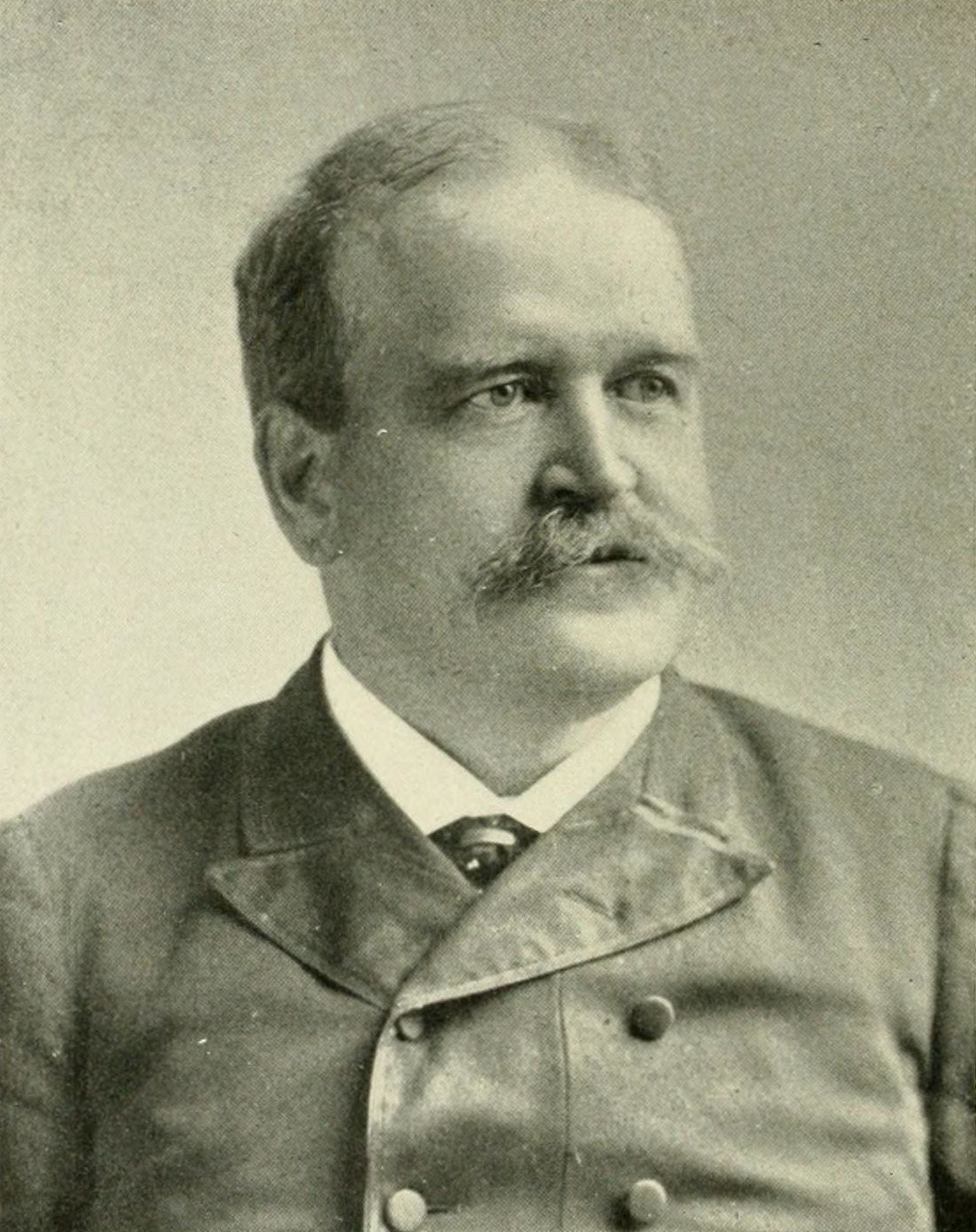

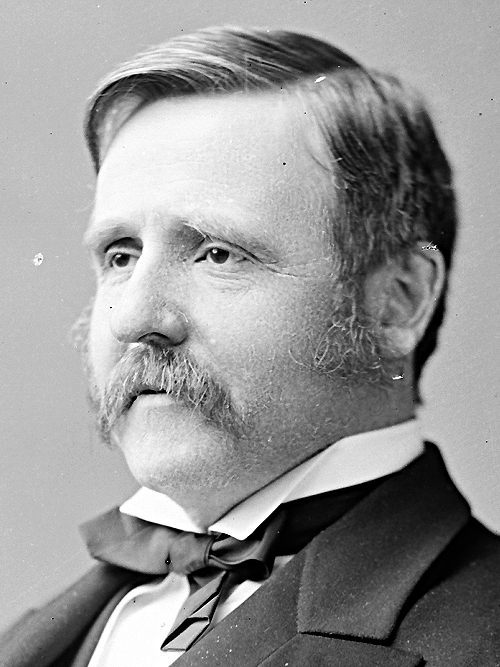
Nominee	John Davis Long	Charles Perkins Thompson
Party	Republican	Democratic
Popular vote	96,609	54,586
Percentage	61.22%	34.59%
- Long: 40-50% 50–60% 60–70% 70–80% 80–90% >90% Thompson: 40-50% 50–60% 60–70% Tie: 40-50% No data
Governor before election
John Davis Long
Republican
Elected Governor
John Davis Long
Republican

The 1881 Massachusetts gubernatorial election was held on November 8.

== Governor ==
Massachusetts gubernatorial election, 1881
Party	Candidate	Votes	%	±%
Republican	John Davis Long (incumbent)	96,609	61.22%	
Democratic	Charles Perkins Thompson	54,586	34.59%	
Greenback	Israel W. Andrews	4,889	3.10%	
Prohibition	Charles Almy	1,640	1.04%	
Others	Others	78	0.05%	
Republican hold		Swing		

== Lt. governor ==
Massachusetts lt. gubernatorial election, 1881
Party	Candidate	Votes	%	±%
Republican	Byron Weston (incumbent)	96,850	61.40%	
Democratic	James H. Carleton	54,329	34.44%	
Greenback	George Dutton	4,932	3.13%	
Prohibition	John Blackmer	1,596	1.01%	
Others	Others	30	0.02%	
Republican hold		Swing		

== See also ==
- 1881 Massachusetts legislature
