= Elijah A. Morse =

American politician (1841–1898)

Elijah Adams Morse
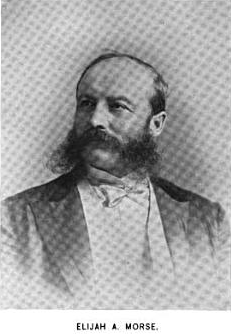

Member of the U.S. House of Representatives from Massachusetts
- In office March 4, 1889 – March 3, 1897
- Preceded by: John Davis Long
- Succeeded by: William C. Lovering
- Constituency: 2nd district (1889–93); 12th district (1893–97)

Member of the Massachusetts Senate
- In office 1886-1887

Member of the Massachusetts House of Representatives
- In office 1876

Personal details
- Born: May 25, 1841 South Bend, Indiana, U.S.
- Died: June 5, 1898 (aged 57) Canton, Massachusetts, U.S.
- Party: Prohibition; Republican
- Profession: Manufacturer of stove polish

Military service
- Allegiance: United States of America
- Branch/service: United States Army
- Rank: Corporal
- Battles/wars: Civil War

Elijah Adams Morse (May 25, 1841 – June 5, 1898) was a U.S. representative from Massachusetts.

Born in South Bend, St. Joseph County, Indiana, Morse moved to Massachusetts with his parents, who settled in Boston in 1852. He attended the public schools, the Boylston School in Boston, and Onondaga Academy, New York. Enlisted in the Union Army in the Fourth Regiment, Massachusetts Volunteers, during the Civil War. He served three months under General Butler in Virginia and one year under General Banks in Louisiana. He was promoted to corporal. Manufacturer of stove polish in Canton, Massachusetts. He served as member of the State house of representatives in 1876. He was an unsuccessful Prohibition Party candidate for lieutenant governor in 1877. He served in the state senate in 1886 and 1887. He served as member of the Governor's council in 1888.

Morse was elected as a Republican to the Fifty-first and to the three succeeding Congresses (March 4, 1889 – March 3, 1897). He served as chairman of the Committee on Alcohol Liquor Traffic (Fifty-fourth Congress). He was not a candidate for renomination in 1896. He resumed manufacturing activities. He died in Canton, Massachusetts, June 5, 1898. He was interred in Canton Cemetery.

U.S. House of Representatives
Preceded by John D. Long	Member of the U.S. House of Representatives from Massachusetts's 2nd congressional district March 4, 1889 - March 3, 1893	Succeeded by Frederick H. Gillett
Preceded by John C. Crosby	Member of the U.S. House of Representatives from Massachusetts's 12th congressional district March 4, 1893 - March 3, 1897	Succeeded by William C. Lovering
