= Benjamin Franklin Wing =

American politician (1822–1898)

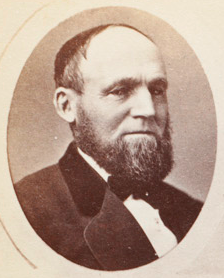

Benjamin Franklin Wing (October 22, 1822 – April 19, 1898) was an American whaling captain and politician who served as a state senator in Massachusetts.

== Biography ==
Born in Dartmouth, Massachusetts to Pardon and Almy née Slocum Wing, he was raised on a farm and educated in the common schools. In 1840, tiring of farming life, he began his maritime career by shipping for a long whaling voyage as a foremast hand on a ship called Washington. His second voyage was also on the Washington, as a boatsteerer. Upon returning home he spent only a short time before shipping out on the St. George for a long voyage as third mate. He next went on the ship Good Return as first mate under a Captain Cook. He made two further voyages, one of nearly four years and another of 30 months, as master of the Good Return. On both stints he was "signally fortunate, the ventures proving highly profitable to the owners and to himself". Subsequently, he commanded the Young Phoenix on an Indian Ocean voyage, with equal success. He next assumed command of the bark, Atlantic, in which he made several long and remunerative cruises. He gave up a seafaring life about 1880, and settled on a farm that he had bought in Dartmouth in 1855. He was described as "one of the most successful of the whaling masters who gave New Bedford its prestige on the ocean".

In addition to his seafaring duties, he was active in local politics. He served seven terms as a selectman, six as chair. He represented Dartmouth in the Massachusetts House of Representatives from 1872 to 1873 and in 1876 was elected to the Massachusetts Senate. His party sought to reelect him to the state senate, but he had to decline, as he was then leaving on another whaling voyage.

Signature

Ship's journal kept by Wing, readable pdf

He owned a large home.

== Personal life and death ==
On March 20, 1851, Wing married Emily Gifford, daughter of John and Charity Gifford, of Westport, Massachusetts, with whom he had two sons and a daughter who survived him.

Wing died at his home in South Dartmouth at the age of 75.

== See also ==
- 1876 Massachusetts legislature
- Bristol County, Massachusetts
