= William C. Lovering =

American politician (1835-1910)

William Croad Lovering
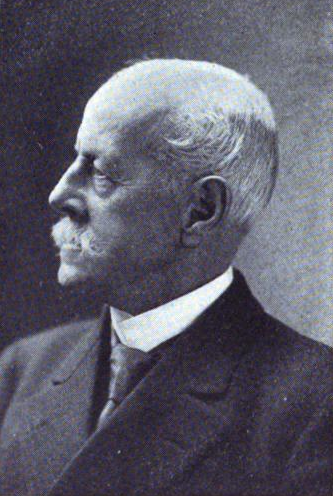
- William C. Lovering circa 1908

Member of the U.S. House of Representatives from Massachusetts
- In office March 4, 1897 – February 4, 1910
- Preceded by: Elijah A. Morse
- Succeeded by: Eugene Foss
- Constituency: 12th district (1897–1903); 14th district (1903–10)

Member of the Massachusetts Senate
- In office 1874–1875

Delegate to the 1880 Republican National Convention
- In office 1880–1880

Personal details
- Born: February 25, 1835 Woonsocket, Rhode Island, U.S.
- Died: February 4, 1910 (aged 74) Washington, D.C., U.S.
- Party: Republican
- Education: Hopkins Classical School, Cambridge High School
- Occupation: Cotton Manufacturer
- Profession: Attorney

Military service
- Branch/service: Union Army
- Battles/wars: American Civil War

William Croad Lovering (February 25, 1835 – February 4, 1910) was a U.S. representative from Massachusetts.

== Biography ==
Born in Woonsocket, Rhode Island, Lovering moved with his parents to Taunton, Massachusetts, in 1837. He attended the Cambridge High School and the Hopkins Classical School, Cambridge, Massachusetts. He left school in 1859 for employment in his father's mill. During the Civil War served as quartermaster of Engineers in the Second Massachusetts Brigade, consisting of the Second and Third Regiments. He engaged in cotton manufacturing in Taunton at the Whittenton Mills. First president of the Taunton Street Railway. He served as president of the American Liability Insurance Co. He was interested in several other business enterprises. He served as president of the New England Cotton Manufacturers' Association (now the National Textile Association) for two years. He served as member of the Massachusetts Senate in 1874 and 1875. He served as delegate to the Republican National Convention in 1880. Presided at the Republican State convention in 1892.

Lovering was elected as a Republican to the Fifty-fifth and to the six succeeding Congresses and served from March 4, 1897, until his death in Atlanta, Georgia, February 4, 1910 of pneumonia. He was interred in Mount Pleasant Cemetery, Taunton, Massachusetts.

His daughter, Frances, married Charles Francis Adams III, United States Secretary of the Navy under Herbert Hoover and a member of the Adams political family.

== See also ==
- 1874 Massachusetts legislature
- 1875 Massachusetts legislature
- List of members of the United States Congress who died in office (1900–1949)

== Bibliography ==
- Who's Who in State Politics, 1908 Practical Politics (1908) p. 16.
- United States Congress. "William C. Lovering (id: L000465)". Biographical Directory of the United States Congress. Retrieved on 2008-02-14

- William C. Lovering, late a representative from Massachusetts, Memorial addresses delivered in the House of Representatives and Senate frontispiece 1911

U.S. House of Representatives
Preceded by Elijah A. Morse	Member of the U.S. House of Representatives from Massachusetts's 12th congressional district 1897—1903	Succeeded by Samuel L. Powers
Preceded by District restored	Member of the U.S. House of Representatives from Massachusetts's 14th congressional district 1903—1910	Succeeded by Eugene Foss
