= Charles Perkins Thompson =

American politician

Charles P. Thompson
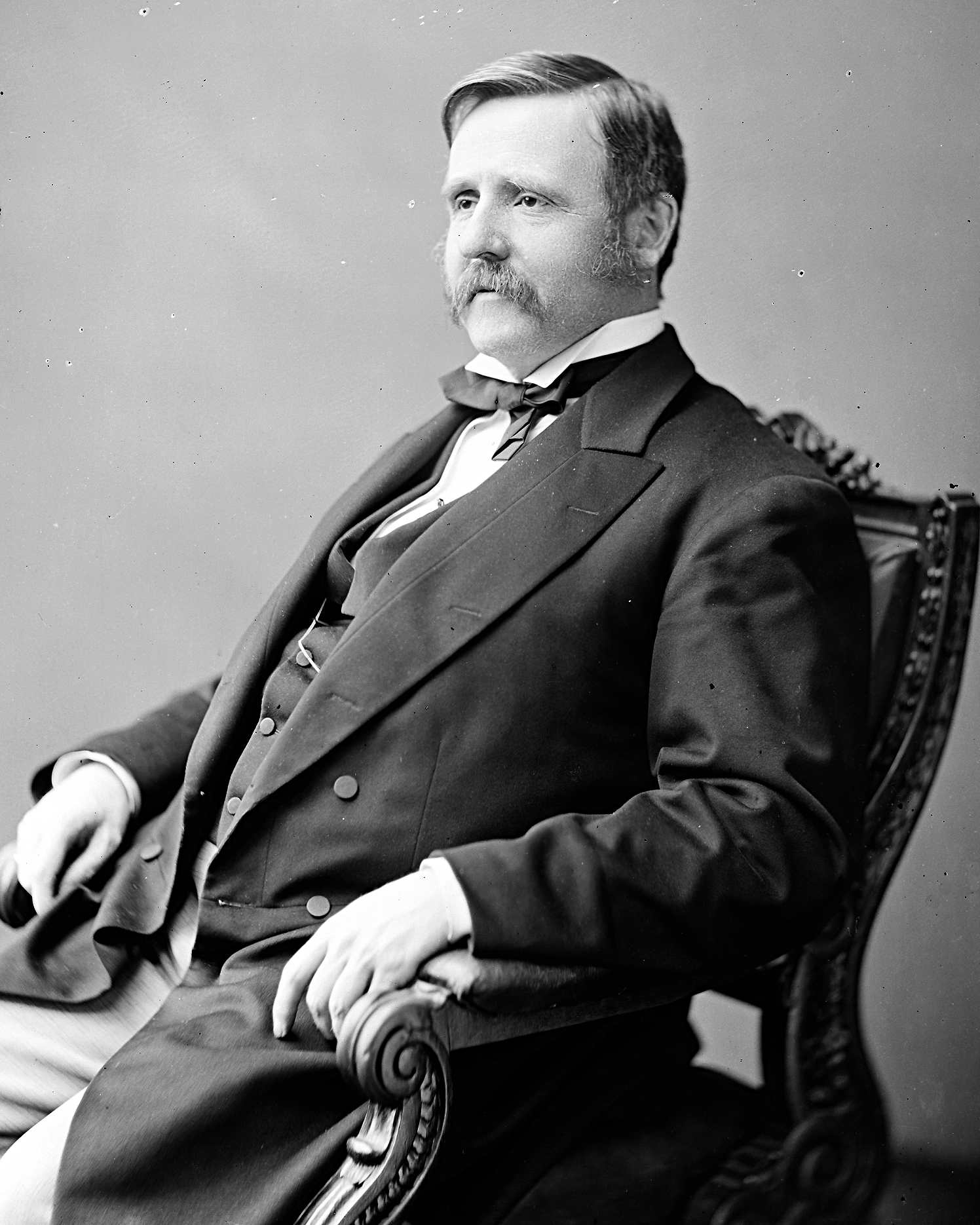

Member of the U.S. House of Representatives from Massachusetts's 6th district
- In office March 4, 1875 – March 3, 1877
- Preceded by: Benjamin Butler
- Succeeded by: George B. Loring

Member of the Massachusetts House of Representatives
- In office 1871–1872

Personal details
- Born: Charles Perkins Thompson; July 30, 1827 Braintree, Massachusetts
- Died: January 19, 1894 (aged 66) Gloucester, Massachusetts
- Resting place: Oak Grove Cemetery
- Party: Democratic
- Education: Amherst College

Charles Perkins Thompson (July 30, 1827 – January 19, 1894) was a 19th-century lawyer and politician who served one term as a member of the United States House of Representatives from Massachusetts from 1875 to 1877.

== Biography ==
Thompson was born in Braintree on July 30, 1827 to Frederick M. and Susanna (Cheesman) Thompson. He attended public schools, the Hollis Institute, and Amherst College. He studied law, was admitted to the bar and commenced practice in Gloucester.

Thompson served as United States Assistant District Attorney from 1855 to 1857, was elected a member of the Massachusetts House of Representatives, and was a delegate to the Democratic National Convention in 1872. He

=== Congress ===
He was elected as a Democrat to the Forty-fourth Congress (March 4, 1875 – March 3, 1877), defeating Republican Benjamin Butler. Thompson was an unsuccessful candidate for reelection to the Forty-fifth Congress.

=== Later career ===
Thompson resumed the practice of law, and served as city solicitor of Gloucester. He was an unsuccessful Democratic candidate for Governor of Massachusetts in 1880 and again in 1881, and served as judge of the Superior Court of Massachusetts from 1885 until his death.

=== Death and burial ===
He died in Gloucester on January 19, 1894. His interment was in Oak Grove Cemetery.

== See also ==
- 1872 Massachusetts legislature

Party political offices
Preceded by Benjamin Butler	Democratic nominee for Governor of Massachusetts; 1880, 1881	Succeeded by Benjamin Butler
U.S. House of Representatives
Preceded by Benjamin Butler	Member of the U.S. House of Representatives from Massachusetts's 6th congressional district March 4, 1875 – March 3, 1877	Succeeded by George B. Loring
