= Edward L. Pierce =

American politician (1829-1897)

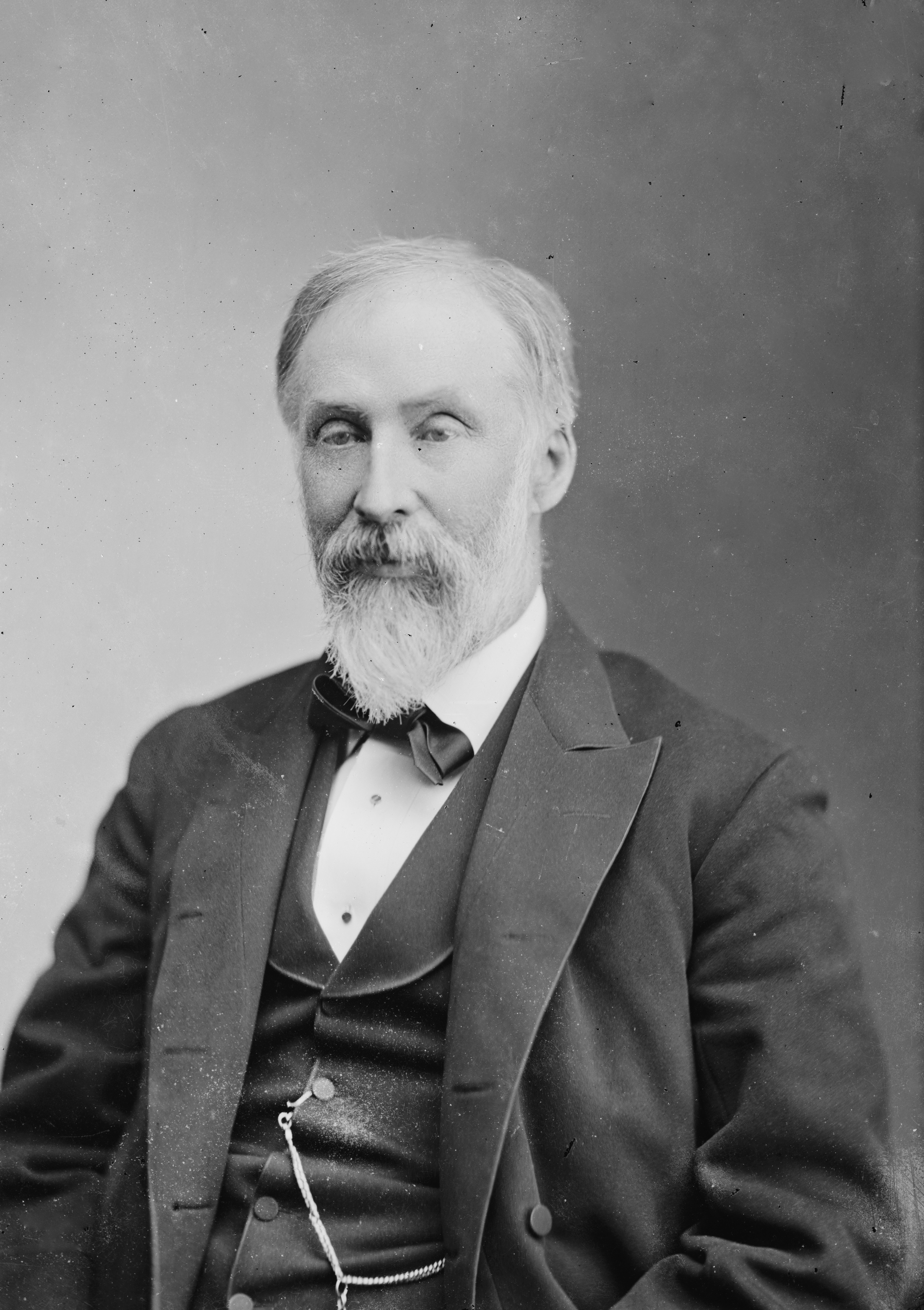
Edward L. Pierce by the Brady-Handy Studio, 1870s

Edward Lillie Pierce (born in Stoughton, Massachusetts, 29 March 1829; died in Paris, 6 September 1897) was an American biographer and politician. He wrote a noted biography of Charles Sumner.

== Biography ==
He graduated from Brown University and Harvard Law School, receiving the degree of LL.D. from Brown. He was a delegate to the Republican National Convention in 1860. At the beginning of the Civil War he enlisted as a private in the 3d Massachusetts Regiment, and served until July 1861, when he was detailed to collect the African Americans at Hampton, Va. and set them to work on the entrenchments of that town. This was the beginning of the employment of African Americans on U. S. military works. In December 1861, the United States Secretary of the Treasury dispatched Pierce to Port Royal, South Carolina to examine conditions for African Americans on the Sea Islands. In February 1862, he returned to Washington and reported to the government.

In March, he was given charge of the freedmen and plantations on those islands. He took with him nearly sixty teachers and superintendents, established schools, and suggested the formation of freedmen's aid societies. In June 1862, Pierce made his second report to the government setting forth what he had done. These reports were afterward reprinted in the Rebellion Record, and were favorably reviewed both in Europe and the United States. The care of the African Americans on the islands having been transferred to the United States Department of War, he was asked to continue in charge under its authority, but declined.

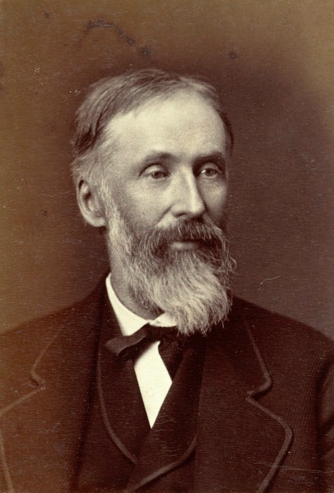
Pierce, circa 1876

He was offered the military governorship of South Carolina, but was not confirmed. He was collector of internal revenue for the 3d Massachusetts District from October 1863 until May 1866, district attorney in 1866-69, secretary of the board of state charities in 1869-74, and a member of the legislature in 1875-76. He was a member of the Republican National Conventions of 1876 and 1884, and in December 1878, was appointed by President Hayes as Assistant Treasurer of the United States, but declined.

In 1883 he gave a library of 800 volumes for the use of both whites and African Americans of St. Helena Island, the scene of his former labors. He also founded the public library of Milton, Massachusetts, where he had resided, and had been a trustee since its organization. He was a lecturer at the Boston Law School since its foundation.

Pierce was elected a member of the American Antiquarian Society in 1892.

Pierce visited Europe several times. His second visit was for the inspection of European prisons, reformatories and asylums, and the result is given in his report for 1873 as secretary of the board of state charities.

Pierce was played in the Civil War movie Glory by actor Christian Baskous.

== Works ==
- American Railroad Law (New York, 1857)
- Memoir and Letters of Charles Sumner (4 vols., Boston, 1877–93)
- The Law of Railroads (Boston)
- Walter's American Law, editor (1860)
- Index of the Special Railroad Laws of Massachusetts, compiler (1874)

He was a frequent contributor to newspapers and periodicals, and published numerous articles and addresses.

== Family ==
In 1865, he married Elizabeth H. Kingsbury from Providence, Rhode Island. They had six children. She died in 1880. In 1882 he married Maria L. Woodheard from Huddersfield, England. They had two children. His brother, Henry L. Pierce, was a U.S. Congressman from Massachusetts.

== See also ==
- 1875 Massachusetts legislature
- 1876 Massachusetts legislature
