= 1876 Massachusetts legislature =

97th Massachusetts General Court
| ← | 96th | 98th | → |

Overview
- Legislative body: General Court
- Election: November 2, 1875

Senate
- Members: 40
- President: George B. Loring
- Party control: Republican

House
- Members: 240
- Speaker: John Davis Long
- Party control: Republican

Sessions
- 1st: January 5, 1876 – April 28, 1876

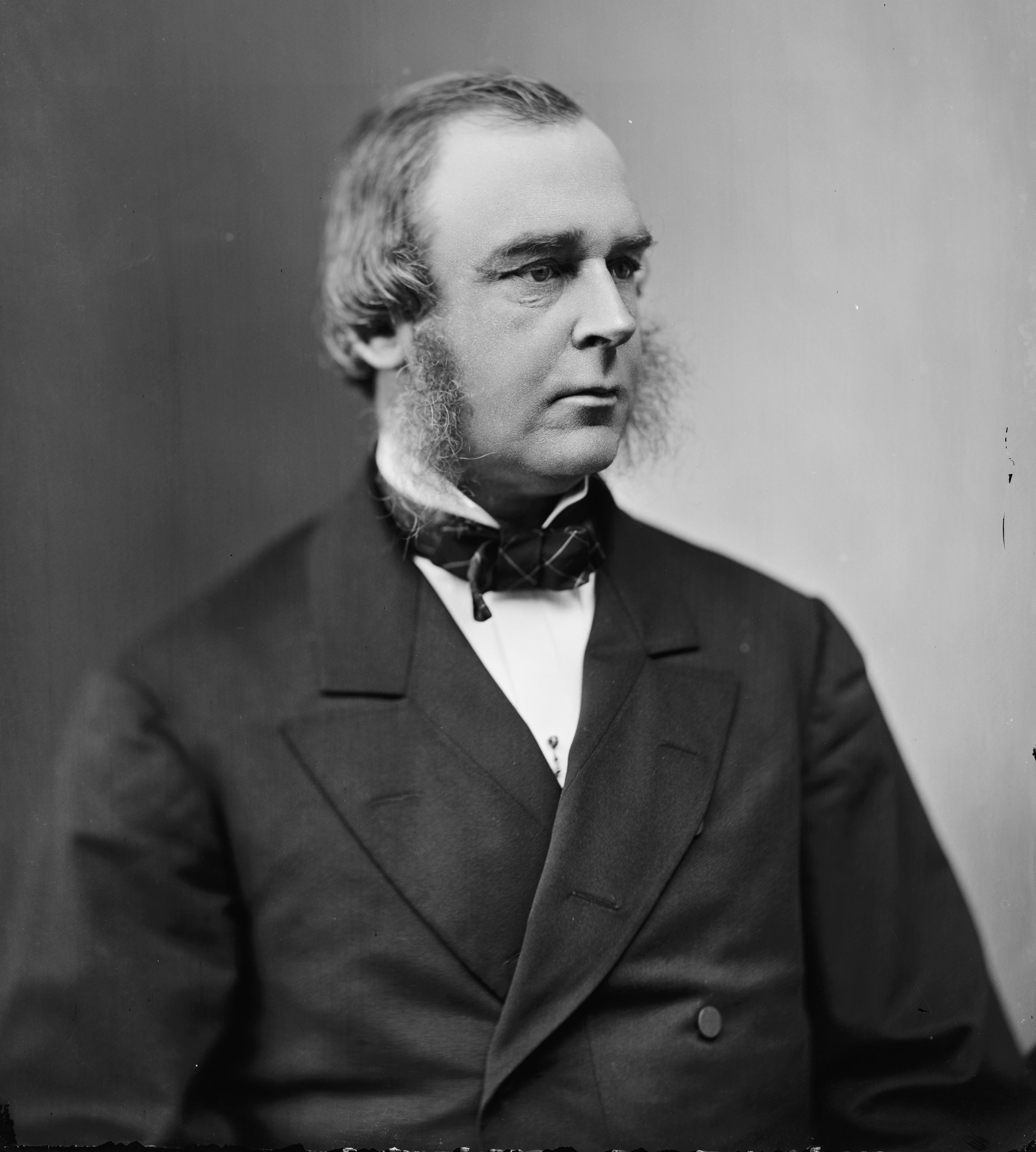
George Loring, Senate president.

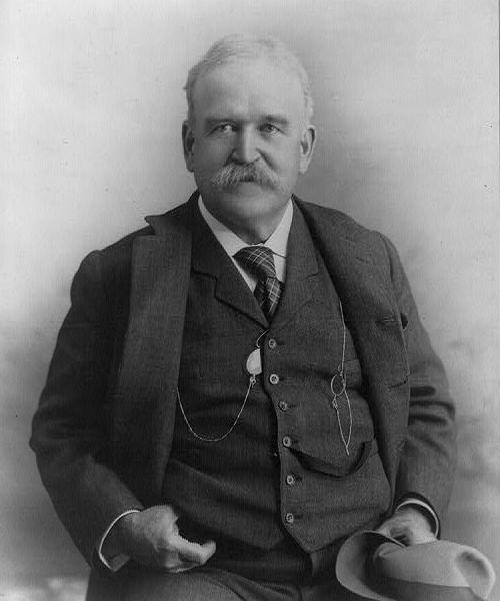
John Davis Long, House speaker.

Leaders of the Massachusetts General Court, 1876.

The 97th Massachusetts General Court, consisting of the Massachusetts Senate and the Massachusetts House of Representatives, met in 1876 during the governorship of Alexander H. Rice. George B. Loring served as president of the Senate and John Davis Long served as speaker of the House.

Members earned a salary of $650 per year.

== Senators ==
| Image | Name | Date of birth | District | Party |
|---|---|---|---|---|
| | Moses O. Ayres | July 21, 1826 | 4th Worcester | |
| | Emery L. Bates | March 16, 1823 | 3rd Worcester | |
| | J. White Belcher | November 14, 1823 | 3rd Norfolk | |
| | Selwyn Zadock Bowman | May 11, 1840 | 2nd Middlesex | |
| | Elisha Brimhall | March 25, 1825 | 5th Worcester | |
| | Haydn Brown | February 16, 1819 | 4th Essex | |
| | Samuel Dexter Crane | 1816 | 5th Suffolk | |
| | John Cummings | 1812 | 6th Middlesex | |
| | Timothy John Dacey | 1849 | 2nd Suffolk | |
| | Edward Livingston Davis | 1834 | 2nd Suffolk | |
| | George L. Davis | June 17, 1816 | 3rd Essex | |
| | Joseph Emery Fiske | 1839 | 2nd Norfolk | |
| | Eustace Carey Fitz | 1833 | 1st Suffolk | |
| | Thomas Francis Fitzgerald | 1848 | 6th Suffolk | |
| | Michael Joseph Flatley | 1823 | 3rd Suffolk | |
| | William Miner Gaylord | 1821 | Hampshire | |
| | Samuel Slocum Ginnodo | 1816 | 1st Bristol | |
| | Joseph Alfred Harwood | March 26, 1827 | 5th Middlesex | |
| | Tilly Haynes | February 13, 1828 | 1st Hampden | |
| | Jonathan Higgins | November 21, 1816 | Cape | |
| | Ezra Coffin Howard | September 1, 1831 | Islands | |
| | Charles Howes | October 26, 1826 | 5th Essex | |
| | Ebenezer Atherton Hunt | January 26, 1826 | Norfolk & Plymouth | |
| | William E. Livingston | June 25, 1832 | 7th Middlesex | |
| | George B. Loring | November 8, 1817 | 2nd Essex | |
| | Horace Hawkes Mayhew | 1826 | Franklin | |
| | Peter M. Neal | September 21, 1811 | 1st Essex | |
| | Albert Palmer | January 17, 1831 | 1st Norfolk | |
| | Francis J. Parker | March 3, 1825 | 4th Middlesex | |
| | Caleb Rand | 1817 | 1st Middlesex | |
| | Everett Robinson | January 22, 1816 | 1st Plymouth | |
| | George D. Robinson | January 20, 1834 | 2nd Hampden | |
| | Henry W. Robinson | October 9, 1819 | 2nd Plymouth | |
| | John Sargent | June 21, 1799 | 3rd Middlesex | |
| | Norman W. Shores | 1834 | Berkshire & Hampshire | |
| | Francis Dana Stedman | 1801 | 4th Suffolk | |
| | Philip J. Tripp | October 28, 1822 | 3rd Bristol | |
| | Byron Weston | April 9, 1832 | Berkshire | |
| | Benjamin Franklin Wing | October 22, 1822 | 2nd Bristol | |

== Representatives ==
| image | Name | Date of birth | District | Party |
|---|---|---|---|---|
| | James Abbe | 1822 | | |
| | Ebenezer Adams | 1830 | | |
| | Stillman Boyd Allen | September 8, 1830 | | |
| | William Augustus Alley | 1841 | | |
| | Edwin Amsden | 1828 | | |
| | Jacob Franklin Appell | 1840 | | |
| | Michael A. Atkinson | 1813 | | |
| | Edwin Ayer | 1827 | | |
| | John James Babson | 1809 | | |
| | Daniel Danforth Bailey | 1834 | | |
| | Monroe Elias Ballou | 1836 | | |
| | Giles Gould Barker | 1838 | | |
| | Patrick Barry | 1834 | | |
| | Daniel Walton Bartlett | 1829 | | |
| | James Edward Taylor Bartlett | 1825 | | |
| | Benjamin Samuel Batchelor | 1829 | | |
| | Eliakim Adams Bates | 1817 | | |
| | Warren Augustus Bird | 1837 | | |
| | Warren Palmer Bird | 1843 | | |
| | Francis Charles Bowen | 1834 | | |
| | Osgood Bradley | 1836 | | |
| | Amos Franklin Breed | October 15, 1830 | | |
| | Lysander Nelson Brownell | 1817 | | |
| | Orrin Bryant | 1837 | | |
| | Joseph Buckminster | 1821 | | |
| | Francis Bugbee | 1829 | | |
| | Isaac Tucker Burr | 1828 | | |
| | Charles Cargill Capron | 1841 | | |
| | Michael Carney | 1827 | | |
| | Frederick Thomas Chase | 1844 | | |
| | Gardner Asaph Churchill | 1839 | | |
| | Frederick Waterston Clapp | 1843 | | |
| | Lafayette Clapp | 1824 | | |
| | John P. Clark | 1837 | | |
| | Edward Coburn | 1820 | | |
| | Henry Fayette Coggshall | 1823 | | |
| | Charles Samuel Converse | 1821 | | |
| | Horace Cook | April 24, 1829 | | |
| | John Hawkins Cook | 1841 | | |
| | Thomas Francis Cordis | 1843 | | |
| | Jeremiah William Coveney | 1840 | | |
| | Michael J. Croak | 1843 | | |
| | Elisha Crocker | 1814 | | |
| | Albert Willoughby Curtiss | 1820 | | |
| | Charles Henry Danforth | 1837 | | |
| | George Fisher Daniels | 1820 | | |
| | Dallas Jay Dean | 1816 | | |
| | Herbert Augustus Dean | 1841 | | |
| | Henry Dennis | 1827 | | |
| | Freeman Doane | 1819 | | |
| | Neil Doherty | 1838 | | |
| | Francis Elisha Downer | 1832 | | |
| | Adin Cady Estabrook | 1828 | | |
| | Alonzo Hathaway Evans | February 24, 1820 | | |
| | George Otis Fairbanks | 1815 | | |
| | William Wallace Fish | 1832 | | |
| | Luther Fisk | 1832 | | |
| | Wesley Lewis Fiske | 1823 | | |
| | Theodore Narcisse Foque | 1831 | | |
| | John Freeto | 1825 | | |
| | Charles Fuller | 1811 | | |
| | Henry William Fuller | June 30, 1839 | | |
| | Charles Lefevre Gardner | 1839 | | |
| | Thomas John Gargan | 1844 | | |
| | Thomas Rogers Garity | 1838 | | |
| | John Murray Gibbons | 1833 | | |
| | Benjamin Gifford | 1824 | | |
| | Onslow Gilmore | 1832 | | |
| | Samuel Slater Gleason | 1842 | | |
| | Curtis Banks Goodsell | 1821 | | |
| | George Washington Granger | 1821 | | |
| | Charles Hale | June 7, 1831 | | |
| | Andrew Hall | 1833 | | |
| | Leander Moody Hannum | 1837 | | |
| | Lyman Sawin Hapgood | 1822 | | |
| | Joseph Tolman Hartt | 1830 | | |
| | James Dana Hartwell | 1831 | | |
| | George Haskell | 1809 | | |
| | Frederick Hathaway | 1810 | | |
| | Isaac Newton Hathaway | 1819 | | |
| | Nathan Mortimer Hawkes | 1843 | | |
| | Alanson Knox Hawks | 1828 | | |
| | Samuel Richardson Heywood | 1821 | | |
| | Samuel Dexter Hicks | 1824 | | |
| | Henry Bozyol Hill | 1823 | | |
| | John Beckford Hill | 1824 | | |
| | Joseph Warren Hill | 1837 | | |
| | Otis M. Hitchings | 1822 | | |
| | Ira Wilmarth Hoffman | 1830 | | |
| | Richard Holley | January 30, 1829 | | |
| | Henry Tolman Holmes | 1829 | | |
| | George Francis Howe | 1825 | | |
| | Weston Howland | 1813 | | |
| | Jonas Sewall Hunt | 1827 | | |
| | Caleb Burroughs Huse | September 13, 1833 | | |
| | Ephraim Alfred Ingalls | 1826 | | |
| | Thomas Leighton Jenks | 1829 | | |
| | Jesse Henry Jones | 1836 | | |
| | Ambrose Keith | 1814 | | |
| | Isaac Newton Keith | November 14, 1838 | | |
| | Monroe Keith | 1835 | | |
| | Ziba Cary Keith | July 13, 1842 | | |
| | Ensign Hosmer Kellogg | July 6, 1812 | | |
| | Edward Kendall | 1822 | | |
| | Patrick Kennedy | 1838 | | |
| | Ensign Kimball | 1818 | | |
| | Moses Kimball | October 24, 1809 | | |
| | William Sterling King | 1818 | | |
| | Joseph Addison Kingsbury | 1837 | | |
| | Edwin Leander Kirtland | 1832 | | |
| | Joel Knapp | 1835 | | |
| | John Knowles | 1823 | | |
| | Henry Charles Knowlton | 1833 | | |
| | Hosea Morrill Knowlton | 1847 | | |
| | Daniel Warren Lawrence | 1830 | | |
| | Henry Lee | 1817 | | |
| | Nathaniel Evan Lindsey | 1843 | | |
| | Samuel Longley | 1823 | | |
| | Charles Addison Loud | 1829 | | |
| | James Mackintosh | 1838 | | |
| | Seth Mann | 1817 | | |
| | Andrus March | 1812 | | |
| | Edward Franklin Mayo | 1826 | | |
| | Ebenezer Martin McPherson | 1836 | | |
| | Christopher Columbus Merritt | September 29, 1830 | | |
| | George Whitney Merritt | 1831 | | |
| | Henry Sherman Miner | 1820 | | |
| | Joseph Mitchell | 1809 | | |
| | Thomas Mooney | 1840 | | |
| | John Morissey | 1818 | | |
| | George Washington Morrill | 1818 | | |
| | Elijah Adams Morse | 1841 | | |
| | William Morse | 1822 | | |
| | Frederick Pierce Moseley | 1826 | | |
| | Jeremiah Murphy | 1834 | | |
| | John Joseph Murphy | 1842 | | |
| | Sherman Nelson | 1834 | | |
| | John Burbank Nichols | 1814 | | |
| | Reuben Noble | 1820 | | |
| | Daniel Noonan | 1834 | | |
| | John B. Norton | 1823 | | |
| | Benjamin Alden Nourse | 1836 | | |
| | Isaac Newton Nutter | June 23, 1836 | | |
| | Weaver Osborn | 1815 | | |
| | Charles Stuart Osgood | 1839 | | |
| | Harvey McCullock Owen | 1833 | | |
| | Frederick Parker | 1810 | | |
| | George Gedney Parker | 1826 | | |
| | David Allen Partridge | 1833 | | |
| | Joseph Frost Paul | 1824 | | |
| | George Robbins Perry | 1836 | | |
| | Charles Hiram Pew | 1842 | | |
| | Stephen Cobb Phinney | 1829 | | |
| | Edward L. Pierce | March 29, 1829 | | |
| | Albert Enoch Pillsbury | August 19, 1849 | | |
| | Charles Greenwood Pope | 1840 | | |
| | David Alden Preston | 1846 | | |
| | David Prouty | 1813 | | |
| | Henry Wheatland Putnam | 1843 | | |
| | Charles Henry Read | 1830 | | |
| | Henry Clifford Read | 1810 | | |
| | Washington Read | 1813 | | |
| | George Randall Reed | 1832 | | |
| | George Williams Reed | 1826 | | |
| | Rice Munn Reynolds | 1838 | | |
| | Charles Baker Rice | 1829 | | |
| | Charles Warren Richards | 1824 | | |
| | Jonathan Cady Richmond | 1821 | | |
| | Wallace Fullum Robinson | 1832 | | |
| | Charles Alvan Rogers | 1836 | | |
| | Joseph Hubbard Root | 1823 | | |
| | Joseph Samuel Ropes | February 6, 1818 | | |
| | Solomon Nash Russell | 1822 | | |
| | Nathaniel Johnson Rust | 1833 | | |
| | Addison Sandford | 1821 | | |
| | Amos Joseph Saunders | 1826 | | |
| | Samuel Dexter Sawin | 1835 | | |
| | Ebenezer Sawyer | 1809 | | |
| | Enoch Sawyer | 1841 | | |
| | John Francis Searle | 1839 | | |
| | Calvin Wilbur Shattuck | 1811 | | |
| | Elijah Carter Shattuck | 1820 | | |
| | Elon Sherman | 1820 | | |
| | Albion King Slade | 1822 | | |
| | Solomon Sias Sleeper | 1815 | | |
| | Isaiah Atkins Small | 1825 | | |
| | Andrew Smith | 1838 | | |
| | Newton Smith | 1837 | | |
| | Robert Dickson Smith | 1838 | | |
| | Webster Smith | 1825 | | |
| | Samuel Snow | 1828 | | |
| | John Russell Southwick | 1819 | | |
| | Benjamin Franklin Stacey | 1834 | | |
| | James Trimble Stevens | 1835 | | |
| | Frederick Mason Stone | 1825 | | |
| | Michael Sullivan | 1837 | | |
| | James Francis Supple | 1844 | | |
| | Charles Alfonso Fletcher Swan | 1830 | | |
| | Jackson Benjamin Swett | 1815 | | |
| | Noah Swett | 1826 | | |
| | Samuel Talbot | 1822 | | |
| | Charles Andrews Taylor | 1826 | | |
| | Oliver Taylor | 1826 | | |
| | Davis Thayer | 1816 | | |
| | Byron Truell | 1834 | | |
| | Henry Grant Tuttle | 1812 | | |
| | William Ingersoll Van Deusen | 1819 | | |
| | Levi Clifford Wade | 1843 | | |
| | Alexander Wadsworth | 1806 | | |
| | Edwin Walden | November 25, 1818 | | |
| | William Sprague Wallace | 1838 | | |
| | Alanson Wendell Ward | 1827 | | |
| | Alonzo Warren | 1827 | | |
| | John Davis Washburn | 1833 | | |
| | Eleazer Everett Waterman | 1810 | | |
| | William Watts | 1835 | | |
| | David Locke Webster | 1813 | | |
| | Austin Clark Wellington | 1840 | | |
| | John Wetherbee | 1828 | | |
| | John Wolcott Wetherell | 1820 | | |
| | John Dwelle Whicher | 1825 | | |
| | Benjamin White | 1826 | | |
| | James White | 1828 | | |
| | Joseph Wilder White | 1825 | | |
| | Edward Whitney | 1815 | | |
| | Moses Williams | 1846 | | |
| | George Colburn Wilson | 1809 | | |
| | John Gilbert Wilson | 1825 | | |
| | Daniel Wing | 1841 | | |
| | Thomas Winship | 1826 | | |
| | Isaac Winslow | 1827 | | |
| | Eliphaz Hibbard Wood | 1810 | | |
| | William Woods | 1840 | | |
| | James Clifton Woodward | 1825 | | |

== See also ==
- 1876 Massachusetts gubernatorial election
- 44th United States Congress
- List of Massachusetts General Courts
