= 1875 Massachusetts legislature =

96th Massachusetts General Court
←	95th	97th	→

Overview
- Legislative body: General Court
- Election: November 3, 1874

Senate
- Members: 40
- President: George B. Loring
- Party control: Republican

House
- Members: 240
- Speaker: John E. Sanford
- Party control: Republican

Sessions
- 1st: January 6, 1875 – May 19, 1875

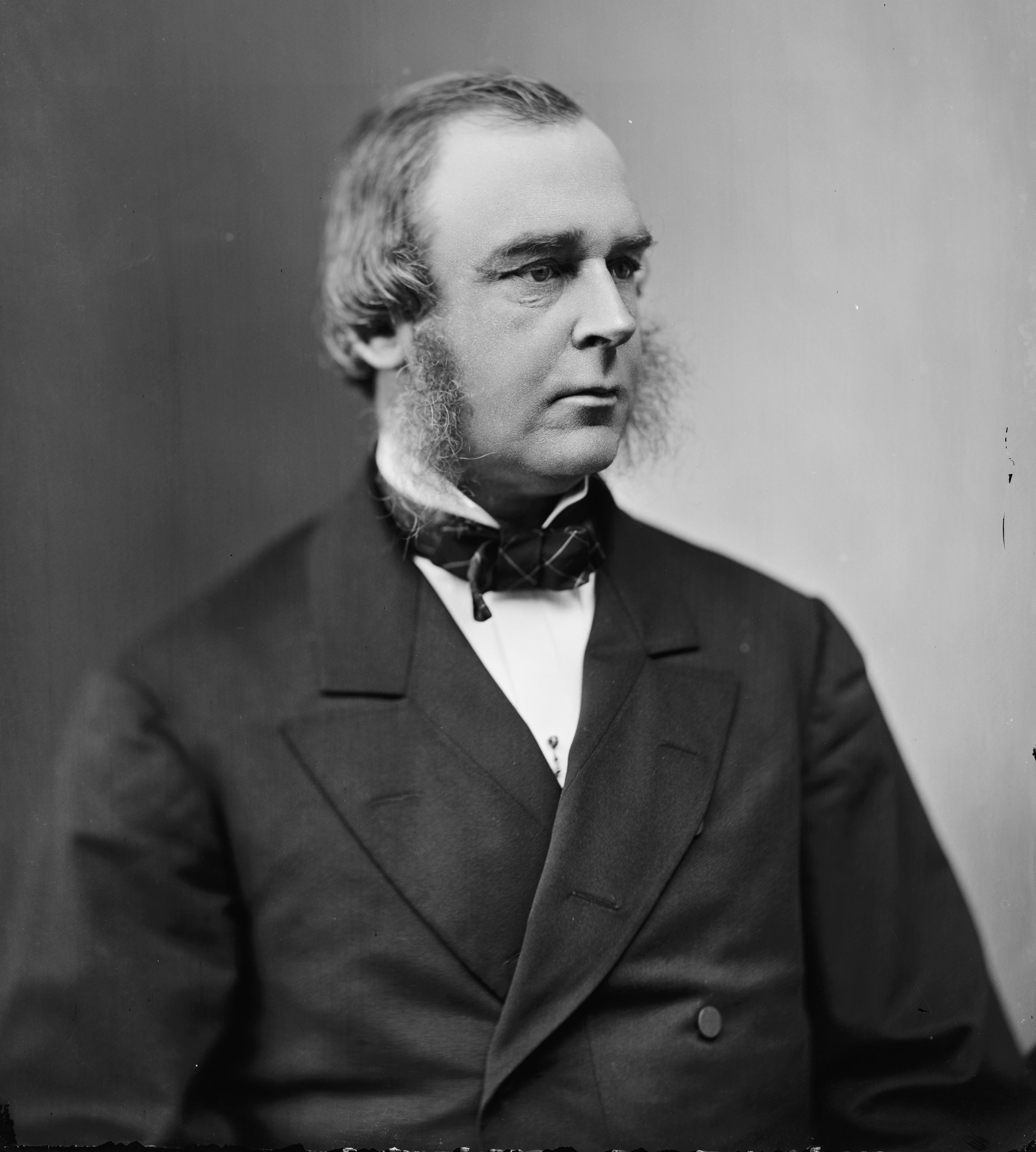
George Loring, Senate president.

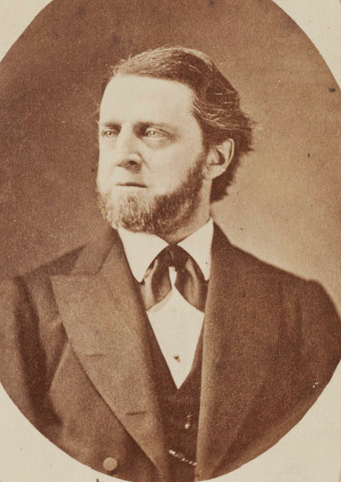
John Sanford, House speaker.

Leaders of the Massachusetts General Court, 1875.

The 96th Massachusetts General Court, consisting of the Massachusetts Senate and the Massachusetts House of Representatives, met in 1875 during the governorship of William Gaston. George B. Loring served as president of the Senate and John E. Sanford served as speaker of the House.

Notable legislation included an "Act To Provide For The Supervision Of The Construction And Maintenance Of Reservoirs And Dams."

== Senators ==
Image	Name	Date of birth	District	Party
	Moses O. Ayres	July 21, 1826	4th Worcester	
	J. White Belcher	November 14, 1823	3rd Norfolk	
	Richard Britton	1838		
	Andrew Jackson Clark	1835		
	Timothy John Dacey	1849		
	George L. Davis	June 17, 1816		
	Francis Edson	1823		
	Charles Fitz	1806		
	Eustace Carey Fitz	1833	1st Suffolk	
	Michael Joseph Flatley	1823		
	Henry Fuller	1825		
	Jeremiah Gatchell	1834		
	Joseph Alfred Harwood	March 26, 1827		
	John Alexander Hawes	1823		
	Ezra Coffin Howard	September 1, 1831		
	Ebenezer Atherton Hunt	January 26, 1826		
	Henry Stanley Hyde	August 18, 1837		
	Thomas Ingalls	1824		
	Jonathan Jones	May 25, 1812		
	Jonathan A. Lane	1822		
	William E. Livingston	June 25, 1832		
	George B. Loring	November 8, 1817		
	William Croade Lovering	February 25, 1835		
	Lysander John Orcutt	1826		
	Albert Palmer	January 17, 1831		
	Ezra Parmenter	March 20, 1823		
	William H. Phillips	November 16, 1830		
	Henry W. Robinson	October 9, 1819		
	Christopher E. Rymes	September 27, 1827		
	Henry Smith	July 16, 1827		
	Charles H. B. Snow	August 7, 1822		
	Francis Dana Stedman	1801		
	Thomas Newcomb Stone	1818		
	Hugh James Toland	1844		
	Washington Tufts			
	George F. Verry	July 14, 1826		
	Zenas Caldwell Wardwell	1831		
	Tisdale Sanford White	1809		
	Robert Rich Wiley	1828		
	Ezra Dyer Winslow	1839		

== Representatives ==
image	Name	Date of birth	District	Party
	James Abbe	1822		
	Ebenezer Adams	1830		
	Samuel Allen	1825		
	Stephen Merrill Allen	1819		
	Andrew Athy	1832		
	Michael A. Atkinson	1813		
	John James Babson	1809		
	Amasa Winchester Bailey	1820		
	Daniel Danforth Bailey	1834		
	Cyrus Franklin Baker	1831		
	John Israel Baker	1812		
	Joseph Heaton Baker	1820		
	Giles Gould Barker	1838		
	Theodore Dwight Beach	1821		
	George Beal	1824		
	John Henry Bell	1829		
	William Harrison Bent	1840		
	James Bergin	1825		
	John Best	1836		
	John Charles Bickford	1836		
	John Henry Blake	1831		
	Stephen Francis Blaney	1844		
	William Edward Blunt	1840		
	Frederick Lincoln Bosworth	1836		
	Sylvester Warren Bowen	1833		
	Horace Leander Bowker	1832		
	Selwyn Zadock Bowman	May 11, 1840		
	Reuben Boynton	1815		
	Osgood Bradley	1836		
	William Eustis Bridgman	1836		
	Wilbur Franklin Brigham	1839		
	William Ellery Bright	1831		
	Samuel Rhoden Brintnall	1820		
	Charles Morrill Brown	1820		
	Isaac Tucker Burr	1828		
	James Hazen Carleton	1818		
	Michael Carney	1827		
	William Carroll	1838		
	William Chase	1817		
	Gardner Asaph Churchill	1839		
	Isaiah Churchill	1806		
	Charles Russell Codman	1829		
	Abraham Burbank Coffin	1831		
	Patrick Collins	1830		
	Austin Henry Connell	1846		
	Owen Coogan	1820		
	Augustine Porter Cook	1843		
	Frederick Spaulding Coolidge	December 7, 1841		
	Lowell Coolidge	1819		
	Alfred Minott Copeland	1830		
	Jeremiah William Coveney	1840		
	John Addison Cummings	1838		
	Benjamin Connor Currier	1822		
	Francis Chester Curtis	1836		
	William Derbyshire Curtis	1843		
	Levi Lincoln Cushing	1825		
	Benjamin Franklin Davis	1837		
	Epes Davis	1799		
	Jacob Winnie Davis	1824		
	Lewis Day	1835		
	Henry Dennis	1827		
	Neil Doherty	1838		
	Cornelius William Duggan	1844		
	James William Dwyer	1845		
	George Whitefield Dyer	1836		
	Edwin Ellis	1823		
	James Edward Estabrook			
	John Brooks Fairbanks	1822		
	Luther Fisk	1832		
	Thomas Francis Fitzgerald	1848		
	Samuel Flower	1815		
	John David Flynn	1842		
	Alpheus Fobes	1829		
	Joseph Fobes	1811		
	William Frost	1822		
	Henry William Fuller	June 30, 1839		
	Charles Lefevre Gardner	1839		
	Albert Warren Gaskill	1831		
	James Willis Gaylord	1844		
	William Miner Gaylord	1821		
	Emerson Geer	1835		
	Edward Eli Gibbs	1836		
	Benjamin Gifford	1824		
	Levi Lincoln Goodspeed	1822		
	Elbridge Henry Goss	1830		
	Charles Henry Green	January 11, 1842		
	Daniel Gardner Green	1817		
	Thomas Thurston Griggs	1818		
	Dexter Grose	1830		
	Charles Hale	June 7, 1831		
	Gayton Montgomery Hall	1835		
	George Hall	1831		
	Solomon Eldridge Hallett	1833		
	David Evans Harding	1826		
	William Ambrose Haskell	1826		
	Nicholas Hatheway	1824		
	George Haven	1809		
	Nathan Mortimer Hawkes	1843		
	George Heywood	1826		
	Moses Burpee Heywood	1827		
	Samuel Richardson Heywood	1821		
	James Edward Hill	1838		
	Joseph Warren Hill	1837		
	Beriah Tilton Hillman	1843		
	William Allen Hodges	1834		
	Elisha Everett Holbrook	1835		
	Amos Bradley Holden	1823		
	Henry Tolman Holmes	1829		
	Salmon Dutton Hood	1830		
	Daniel Parker Hopkinson	1835		
	Marius Milner Hovey	1818		
	William Brewster Howard	1836		
	Frederick George Howes	1832		
	Francis M. Hughes	1845		
	Simeon Alonzo Jacobs	1835		
	Henry Lyman James	1829		
	Edward Jonathan Johnson	1832		
	Thomas Johnson	1824		
	George Washington Jones	1822		
	Isaac Newton Keith	November 14, 1838		
	Philo Keith	1806		
	William Keith	1810		
	Ziba Cary Keith	July 13, 1842		
	Edward Kendall	1822		
	Moses Kimball	October 24, 1809		
	William Sterling King	1818		
	George Parkman Kingsley	1840		
	Joel Knapp	1835		
	William Shadrach Knox	September 10, 1843		
	Daniel Warren Lawrence	1830		
	John Burt Le Baron	1817		
	Benjamin Flint Leighton	1820		
	Daniel James Lewis	1810		
	George Tyler Lincoln	1840		
	Pliny Thurston Litchfield	1827		
	James Lovering Locke	1832		
	John Davis Long	October 27, 1838		
	James Thomas Mahony	1843		
	John Bernard Martin	1848		
	William Martin	1815		
	Joseph Tinsley Massey	1808		
	Edward Selden May	1809		
	Samuel May	1810		
	James Athansius McDonald	1842		
	John Johnson McNutt	1822		
	William Branwell Merrill	1827		
	Clement Meserve	1822		
	Southard Harrison Miller	1811		
	Henry Sherman Miner	1820		
	Joseph Mitchell	1809		
	Franklin Gerrish Morris	1841		
	John Torrey Morse	1840		
	Frederick Pierce Moseley	1826		
	Willard Stanley Newhall	1831		
	George Lincoln Newton	1841		
	Edward Wolcott Noble	1811		
	Reuben Noble	1820		
	Daniel Noonan	1834		
	Isaac Newton Nutter	June 23, 1836		
	Charles Stuart Osgood	1839		
	Harrison Davis Packard	1840		
	Joseph Frost Paul	1824		
	Charles Mason Peirce	1823		
	William Edward Perkins	1838		
	Charles Hiram Pew	1842		
	Willard Peele Phillips	1825		
	Stephen Cobb Phinney	1829		
	Edward L. Pierce	March 29, 1829		
	James Pierce	1837		
	Thomas Fitzpatrick Plunkett	1804		
	Alanson Brown Pomeroy	1842		
	Richard Pope	1843		
	Isaac Pratt	1814		
	Willard Putnam	1838		
	Edward Benedict Rankin	1846		
	George Williams Reed	1826		
	Albert Edward Rice	1845		
	William Whitney Rice	March 7, 1826		
	Thomas Rich	1820		
	Jonathan Cady Richmond	1821		
	John Lombard Robinson	1835		
	Joshua Crowell Robinson	1834		
	Wallace Fullum Robinson	1832		
	Charles Alvan Rogers	1836		
	Joseph Samuel Ropes	February 6, 1818		
	Cyrus King Russell	1815		
	Nathaniel Johnson Rust	1833		
	John Stevens Ryder	1822		
	John Sanborn	1799		
	Edward Sanderson	1829		
	Charles Brigham Sanford	1817		
	John Eliot Sanford	November 22, 1830		
	Cyrus Savage	September 2, 1832		
	John Savery	1815		
	Ebenezer Sawyer	1809		
	Nathaniel Seaver	1807		
	John Mark Seeley	1814		
	Charles Luther Shaw	1823		
	Frederick Plummer Shaw	1811		
	Isaiah Atkins Small	1825		
	George Dillingham Smalley	1824		
	Abraham Howland Smith	1833		
	Albert Smith	1823		
	Edward F. Smith	1835		
	John Low Smith	1837		
	Edwin Adolphus Spaulding	1832		
	Richard Hall Stearns	December 25, 1824		
	Isaac Stebbins	1817		
	Lafayette Stevens	1824		
	John Conant Stimpson	1813		
	Isaac Stone	1822		
	Charles Alfonso Fletcher Swan	1830		
	Daniel Joseph Sweeney	1834		
	Samuel Talbot	1822		
	Leonard Alden Thayer	1834		
	William Allen Thompson	1810		
	Daniel Holt Thurston	1813		
	Dexter Alley Tompkins	1827		
	George Howard Torrey	1819		
	Enoch Henry Towne	1835		
	Byron Truell	1834		
	Albert Jesse Trull	1845		
	Charles Russell Tucker	1844		
	Artemas Stanley Tyler	1824		
	Edmond Maxam Vincent	1828		
	Cranmore Nesmith Wallace	1844		
	George Milton Warren	1832		
	Austin Clark Wellington	1840		
	Joseph Wilder White	1825		
	Felix Grundy Whitney	1818		
	Wilbur Fisk Whitney	1839		
	Henry Munson Wilcox	1843		
	Ebenezer Crosby Willard	1821		
	Moses Williams	1846		
	William Winn	1809		
	Nathan Montgomery Wood	1825		
	John H. Woodbury	1840		
	William Woods	1840		
	Walter Wyman	1806		

== See also ==
- 44th United States Congress
- List of Massachusetts General Courts
