= Benjamin W. Harris =

American politician (1823–1907)

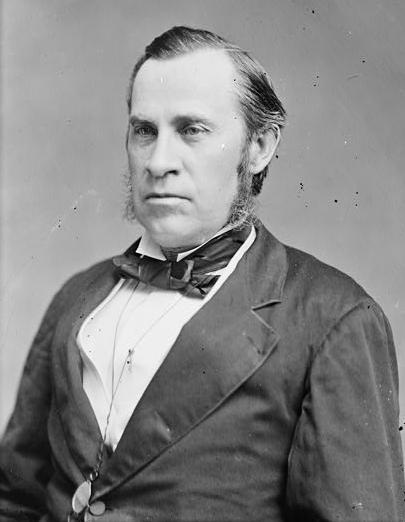
- Harris, 1865–1880

Member of the U.S. House of Representatives from Massachusetts's 2nd district
- In office March 4, 1873 – March 3, 1883
- Preceded by: Oakes Ames
- Succeeded by: John Davis Long

Member of the Massachusetts House of Representatives
- In office 1858

Member of the Massachusetts Senate
- In office 1857-1858

Personal details
- Born: Benjamin Winslow Harris; November 10, 1823 East Bridgewater, Massachusetts, U.S.
- Died: February 7, 1907 (aged 83) East Bridgewater, Massachusetts, U.S.
- Party: Republican
- Profession: Politician, Lawyer, Judge

Benjamin Winslow Harris (November 10, 1823 – February 7, 1907) was a politician, lawyer and judge from Massachusetts. He was the father of Robert Orr Harris.

Born in East Bridgewater, Massachusetts, Harris pursued an academic course at Phillips Academy, Andover, graduating in 1847. He graduated from Dane Law School of Harvard University in 1849. He was admitted to the bar in Boston, Massachusetts, in 1850, commencing practice in East Bridgewater. He served in the Massachusetts Senate in 1857, was a member of the Massachusetts House of Representatives in 1858, was district attorney for the southeastern district of Massachusetts from 1858 to 1866 and was collector of internal revenue for the second district of Massachusetts from 1866 to 1873.

Harris was elected a Republican to the United States House of Representatives in 1872, serving from 1873 to 1883, not being a candidate for renomination in 1882. There, he served as chairman of the Committee on Naval Affairs from 1881 to 1883. Afterwards, he resumed practicing law in East Bridgewater, Massachusetts, and was judge of probate for Plymouth County, Massachusetts, from 1887 to 1906. Harris died in East Bridgewater on February 7, 1907, and was interred in Central Cemetery in East Bridgewater.

U.S. House of Representatives
Preceded by Oakes Ames	Member of the U.S. House of Representatives from Massachusetts's 2nd congressional district March 4, 1873 – March 3, 1883	Succeeded by John D. Long
