= George B. Loring =

American politician (1817–1891)

George Loring
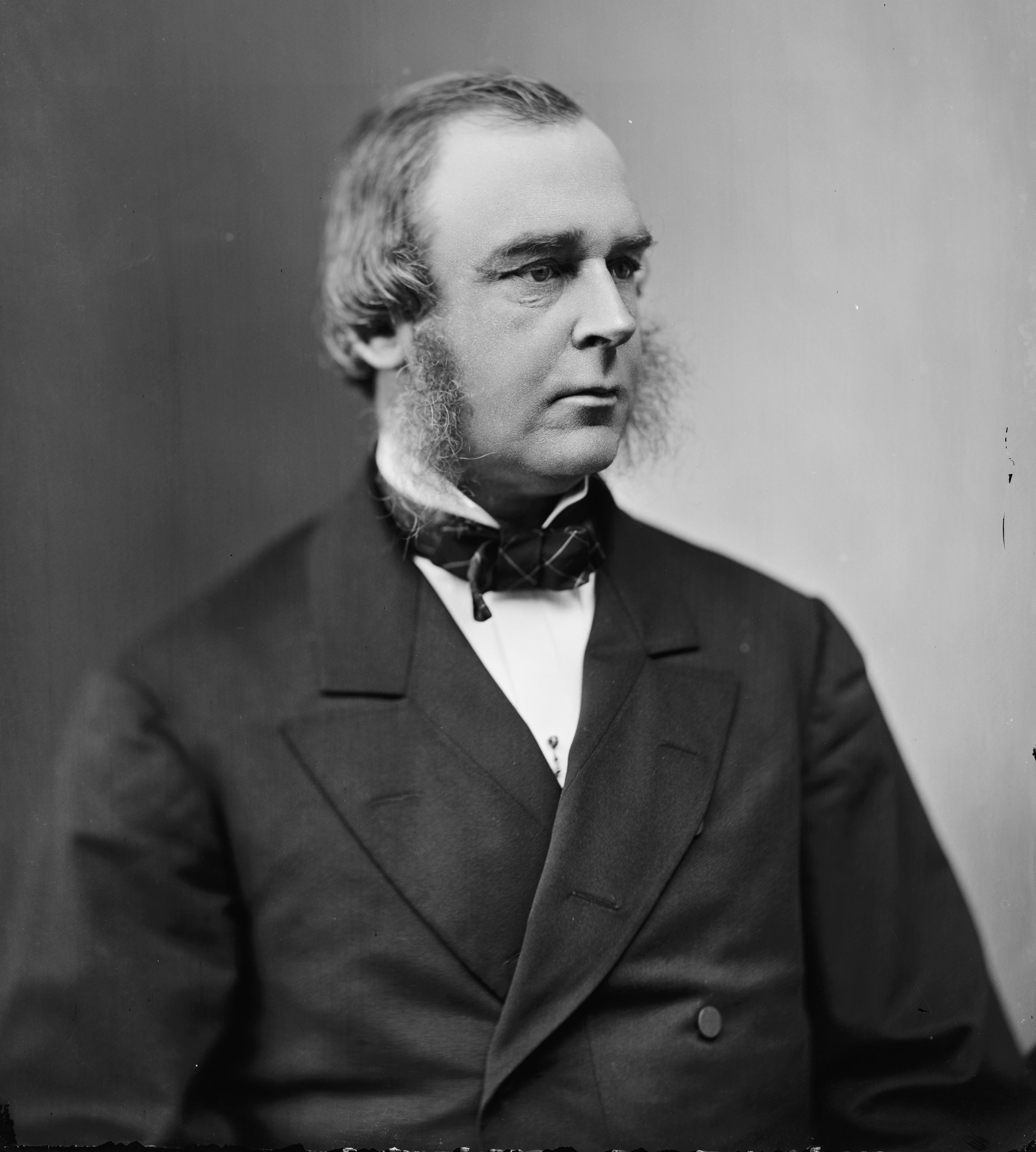
- Loring c. 1865–80

United States Minister to Portugal
- In office August 29, 1889 – May 31, 1890
- President: Benjamin Harrison
- Preceded by: Edward Parke Custis Lewis
- Succeeded by: George S. Batcheller

5th United States Commissioner of Agriculture
- In office July 1, 1881 – March 4, 1885
- President: James A. Garfield; Chester A. Arthur
- Preceded by: William Gates LeDuc
- Succeeded by: Norman Jay Coleman

Member of the U.S. House of Representatives from Massachusetts's 6th district
- In office March 4, 1877 – March 3, 1881
- Preceded by: Charles Perkins Thompson
- Succeeded by: Eben F. Stone

President of the Massachusetts Senate
- In office 1873–1876
- Preceded by: Horace H. Coolidge
- Succeeded by: John B. D. Cogswell

Member of the Massachusetts Senate
- In office 1873–1876

Chair of the Massachusetts Republican Party
- In office 1869–1876
- Preceded by: John B. Alley (1859)
- Succeeded by: Alanson W. Beard

Member of the Massachusetts House of Representatives
- In office 1866–1867

Personal details
- Born: George Bailey Loring; November 8, 1817 North Andover, Massachusetts, U.S.
- Died: September 14, 1891 (aged 73) Salem, Massachusetts, U.S.
- Resting place: Harmony Grove Cemetery
- Party: Republican
- Education: Harvard University (BS, MD)
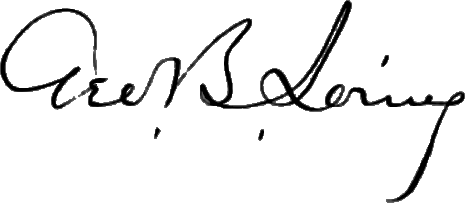
- Signature

George Bailey Loring (November 8, 1817 – September 14, 1891) was a 19th-century American physician and politician who served two terms as a member of the United States House of Representatives from Massachusetts, from 1877 to 1881.

== Biography ==
A son of Unitarian minister Bailey Loring and Sally Pickman (Osgood) Loring, and fourth great grandson of early settler Deacon Thomas Loring, George B. attended Franklin Academy at Andover, Massachusetts and later briefly taught school. He graduated from Harvard University in 1838 and from the Harvard medical school in 1842. He practiced medicine for a short time in North Andover. Served as surgeon of the marine hospital at Chelsea, Massachusetts (1843–1850) and as surgeon of the Seventh Regiment, Massachusetts Volunteer Militia (1842–1844).

=== Early political posts ===
He was appointed commissioner to revise the United States marine hospital system in 1849.

Moved to Salem, Massachusetts in 1851; appointed postmaster of Salem on May 4, 1853, and served until his successor was appointed on February 16, 1858.

He was a member of the Massachusetts House of Representatives from 1866 to 1867 and chair of the Massachusetts Republican State Committee from 1869 to 1876. He served in the Massachusetts Senate from 1873 to 1876, rising to the role of president of that body.

He was a delegate to the Republican National Conventions in 1868, 1872, and 1876, and was appointed United States centennial commissioner for the state of Massachusetts in 1872.

=== Congress ===
In 1876, he was elected as a Republican to the 45th United States Congress. He won reelection in 1878 to the 46th Congress, but was an unsuccessful candidate for renomination in 1880.

=== Later career ===
Made United States commissioner of agriculture (1881–1885); appointed United States minister to Portugal in 1889 and served until his resignation in 1890.

=== Family ===
Loring married Mary Toppan Pickman (1816-1878), daughter of Dr. Thomas Pickman and his wife, Sophia Palmer Pickman, and also his cousin. His great-uncle, and his wife's uncle, was Benjamin Pickman Jr., Congressman from Massachusetts; his third cousin, once removed, and her first cousin, twice removed was George P. Wetmore, Governor and United States Senator from Rhode Island. Another great-uncle is Samuel Osgood. After Mary's death, Loring married Anna Smith Hildreth, daughter of former U.S. consul to Siam Isaac Townsend Smith and widow of Charles Henry Hildreth, in 1880.

=== Death and burial ===
Loring died in Salem, Massachusetts on September 14, 1891, aged 73, and was interred in Harmony Grove Cemetery.

== See also ==
- 94th Massachusetts General Court (1873)
- 95th Massachusetts General Court (1874)
- 96th Massachusetts General Court (1875)
- 97th Massachusetts General Court (1876)

Political offices
Preceded by Horace H. Coolidge	President of the Massachusetts Senate; 1873–1876	Succeeded by John B. D. Cogswell
Preceded by William Gates LeDuc	United States Commissioner of Agriculture; 1881–1885	Succeeded by Norman Jay Coleman
U.S. House of Representatives
Preceded by Charles Perkins Thompson	Member of the U.S. House of Representatives from Massachusetts's 6th congressional district 1877–1881	Succeeded by Eben F. Stone
Diplomatic posts
Preceded by Edward Parke Custis Lewis	United States Minister to Portugal; 1889–1890	Succeeded by George S. Batcheller
