= William Sterling King =

American army officer

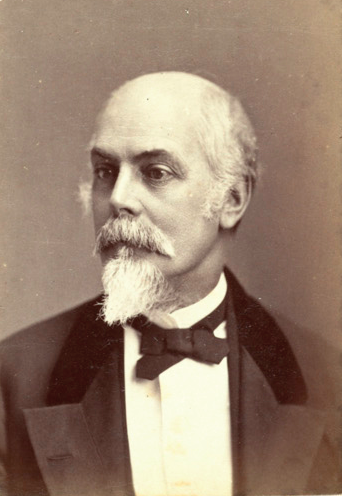
- Born: October 6, 1818; New York City, U.S.
- Died: June 29, 1882 (aged 63); Roxbury, Massachusetts, U.S.
- Burial place: Forest Hills Cemetery
- Military career
- Allegiance: United States: Union
- Branch: Union Army
- Service years: 1862–1865
- Rank: Colonel; Brevet Brigadier General
- Unit: 35th Massachusetts Infantry Regiment
- Commands: 4th Massachusetts Heavy Artillery Regiment
- Conflicts: American Civil War: Battle of Antietam; Battle of South Mountain

William Sterling King (October 6, 1818 – June 29, 1882) was an American officer in the Union Army during the American Civil War, twice elected to the Massachusetts legislature, and was the first Chief Constable of the then-Massachusetts State Constabulary (the contemporary name of the modern Massachusetts State Police).

== Early life, education and career ==
King was born in Manhattan in 1818 to Elisha William King (1781-1836), a New York City lawyer and politician, and Margaret Van der Voort (1783-1863).

He studied in Pelham, New York, before becoming a student at Yale College and later graduating from Union College as the youngest member of the Class of 1837.

King practiced law in New York City from 1839 to 1843 before moving to Woodland Farm in North Providence, Rhode Island. In 1852, he moved to Roxbury, Massachusetts. He was co-editor of the Journal of Agriculture from 1852 to 1862 and from 1855 to 1862 he served in the Massachusetts legislature as a representative of the Know Nothing Movement.

== American Civil War ==
King enlisted in the Union Army on August 4, 1862 and mustered on August 10 as Captain of Company K, 35th Massachusetts Infantry Regiment.

King commanded the regiment in the battles of South Mountain and Antietam. The regiment suffered heavy losses; according to one source, nearly half of Company K was killed or wounded in these engagements. On September 17 he was severely wounded at Antietam. According to contemporary accounts, he was hit by shot and shell between twenty and twenty-one times and received seven wounds.

After recovering from his wounds, King was promoted to Major of the regiment on December 15, 1862 and to Lieutenant Colonel on April 25, 1863. By 1864, he had served as chief of staff of the 2nd Division, IX Corps (1862), Provost-Marshal General of Kentucky (1863), and military commander of the district of Lexington, Kentucky (1863). He was discharged on November 14, 1864, to take the appointment as Colonel of the 4th Massachusetts Heavy Artillery Regiment on November 22.

King was honored by brevet to Brigadier General of Volunteers on March 12, 1865, and mustered out of the service on June 17, 1865, in Washington, D.C.

== Later career ==
After the war, King lived in Lynn, Massachusetts. In July 1865 King was appointed by Governor John Albion Andrew as the first Constable of the Commonwealth of Massachusetts, now the Massachusetts State Police. He is credited for designing the first badge worn by the state police.

In 1866, King was made an assessor of United States Internal Revenue, and in 1871 became Registrar of Probate and Insolvency. He returned to the Massachusetts legislature in 1875-1876.

== Personal life ==
King married Miss Ellen Grinnell of Providence, Rhode Island, on May 6, 1844. They had four children, all of whom died between the ages of sixteen and twenty-one.

King was an Episcopalian.

== See also ==
- 1875 Massachusetts legislature
- 1876 Massachusetts legislature
- 1878 Massachusetts legislature
- List of American Civil War brevet generals (Union)
