= William E. Livingston =

American politician

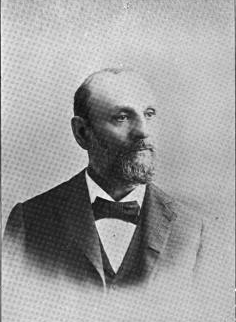

Member of the Massachusetts State Senate
- In office 1875–1876

Member of the Lowell, Massachusetts Board of Aldermen
- In office 1867–1868

Personal details
- Born: June 25, 1832 Lowell, Massachusetts
- Died: July 5, 1919 (aged 87) Lowell, Massachusetts
- Spouse: Mary E. C. King (m. 1857)
- Children: 7
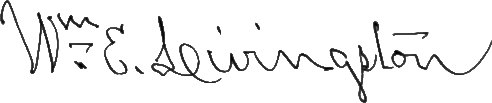
- Signature

William Edward Livingston (June 25, 1832 – July 5, 1919) was a Massachusetts businessman, and politician who served as a member of the Board of Aldermen of Lowell, Massachusetts from 1867 to 1868, and in the Massachusetts Senate from 1875 to 1876.

== Biography ==
William E. Livingston was born in Lowell, Massachusetts on June 25, 1832. He was educated in the Lowell public schools and at Williston Seminary.

He married Mary E. C. King in September 1857, and they had seven children.

A coal merchant, he also served as Water Commissioner, and as commissioner to supervise the erection of a new city hall and memorial building in Lowell.

Livingston died at his home in Lowell on July 5, 1919, at the age of 87.

== See also ==
- 1875 Massachusetts legislature
- 1876 Massachusetts legislature
