= Front Street Historic District (Weymouth, Massachusetts) =

Historic district in Massachusetts, United States

- U.S. National Register of Historic Places
- U.S. Historic district
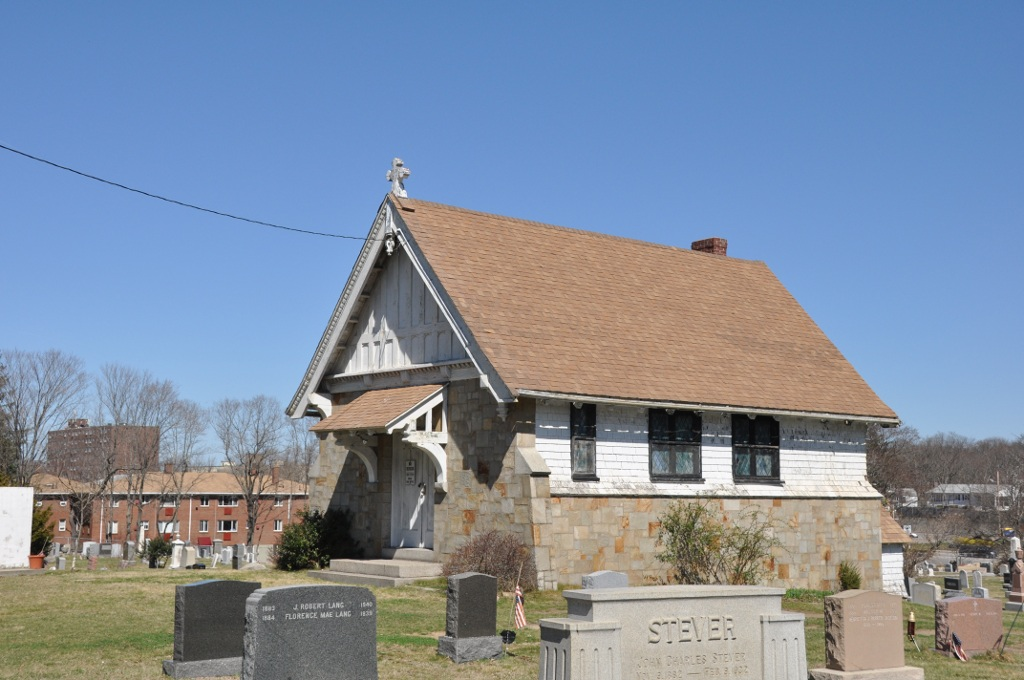
- Chapel in Weymouth Village Cemetery

- Location within Massachusetts Location within the United States
- Location: Weymouth, Massachusetts
- Coordinates: 42°12′39″N 70°57′43″W
- Area: 77 acres (31 ha)
- NRHP reference No.: 10001121
- Added to NRHP: August

The Front Historic District is a predominantly residential historic district in Weymouth, Massachusetts. From the 18th to the 20th century, the area encompassed by this district was one of the more fashionable and desirable neighborhoods adjacent to the commercial Weymouth Landing area. It also contains remnants of a once-flourishing small scale shoe manufacturing industry. The 77-acre (31 ha) district includes nearly 150 resources, primarily residential houses, as well as a school, two cemeteries, and a small cluster of commercial buildings. The district was added to the National Register of Historic Places in 2011.

The district is focused on the northern stretch of Front Street, extending roughly from Washington Street in the north to Congress Street in the south. It also includes rows of properties along Summer Street from its junction with Front Street to Kingman Street, as well as Franklin and Broad Streets; individual properties lie on other streets immediately adjacent to the included sections of Front and Summer Streets.

The geographically largest portions of the district are the Weymouth Village Cemetery (established 1843), at its southeastern corner, Weston Park (established in the 1920s) in its northeast, and the Hunt Street School property (a Colonial Revival public school built 1915-17 that now houses a private Christian academy). The oldest building in the district is a Cape Style house built c. 1720 at 160 Front Street; there are other 18th century Cape and Georgian style homes on Front and Summer Streets. One example of a 19th-century shoemaker's shop that survives is the building at 99 Front Street, now converted to a residence. Smaller shops, which have been converted to garages or other outbuildings, also survive at 131 and 204 Front Street.

== See also ==
- National Register of Historic Places listings in Norfolk County, Massachusetts
