= Byron Weston =

American politician

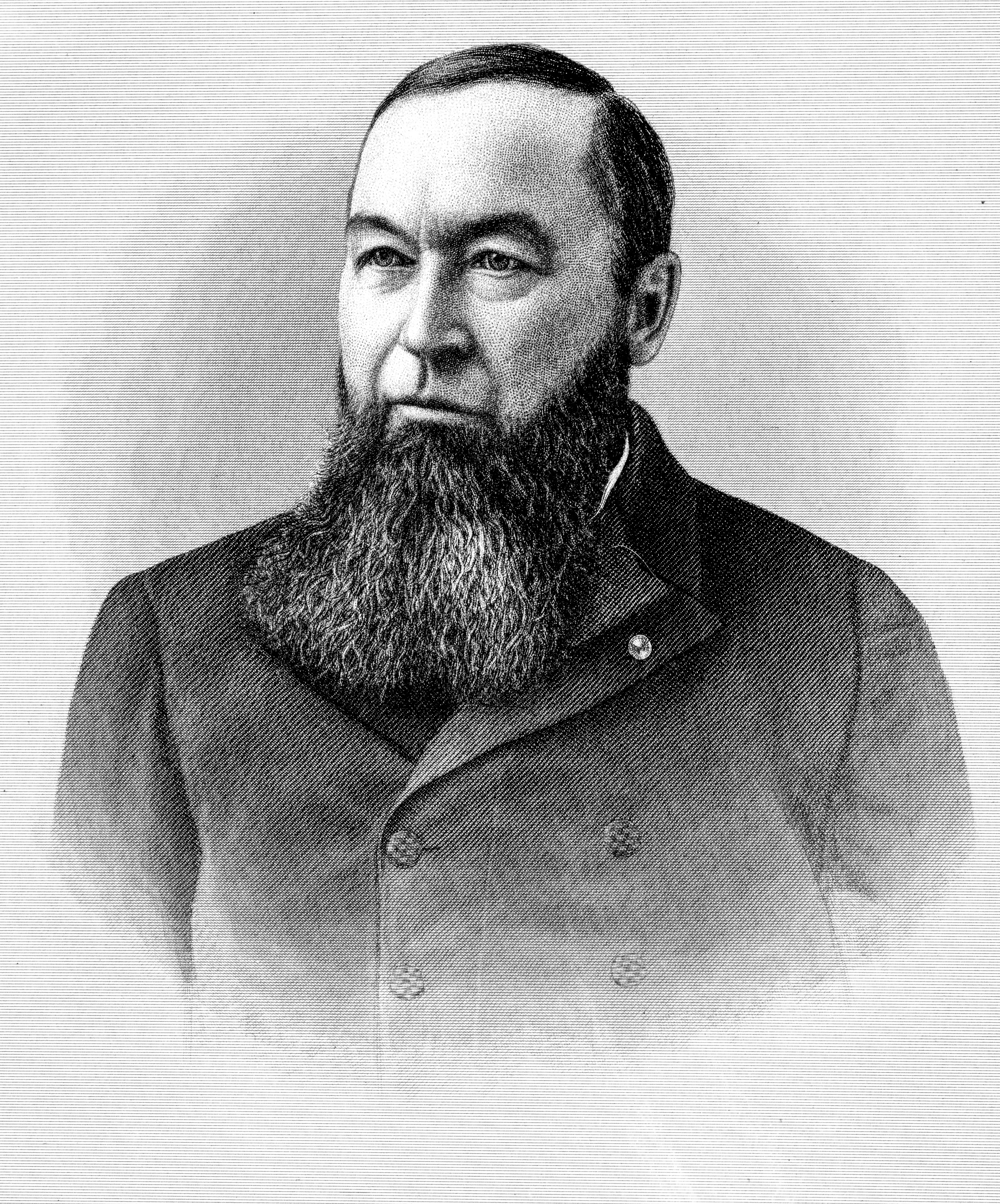

32nd Lieutenant Governor of Massachusetts
- In office January 8, 1880 – January 4, 1883
- Governor: John Davis Long
- Preceded by: John Davis Long
- Succeeded by: Oliver Ames

Personal details
- Born: Bryon Curtis Weston; April 9, 1832 Dalton, Massachusetts, US
- Died: November 8, 1898 (aged 66) Dalton, Massachusetts, US
- Party: Republican
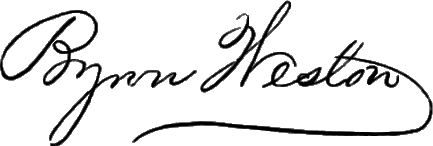
- Signature

Captain Byron Curtis Weston (April 9, 1832 – November 8, 1898) was a native of Massachusetts who founded the Weston Paper Company in 1863 (which ceased to exist following its sale in 2008) and served as the 32nd lieutenant governor of Massachusetts from 1880 to 1883.

== Biography ==
He came from an old New England Congregationalist family of extraordinary wealth. In 1865, he married Julia Clark Mitchell, with whom he had ten children, including Julia Carolyn Weston, mother to the well known chef and Office of Strategic Services operative Julia Child. They lived in a mansion known as Westonholme, in Dalton, Massachusetts. Byron was elected to the Massachusetts State Senate in 1876. Weston was known for his gifts to the community, including the Grace Episcopal Church in his hometown and funds towards the debt incurred for the grading and draining of an athletic field and monies toward upkeep and a grandstand at Williams College. Weston received an honorary M.A. from Williams College in 1886 and the field, still used today, was named Weston Field in his honor. The Weston Paper Company was acquired by Crane Paper known for currency with the Weston brand used for fine stationery.

Byron's daughter Ellen Mitchell Weston married Hale Holden in 1895.

Byron Weston died at his home in Dalton on November 8, 1898.

== See also ==
- 1876 Massachusetts legislature

Political offices
Preceded by John Davis Long	Lieutenant Governor of Massachusetts; 1880–1883	Succeeded by Oliver Ames
