= Rock Crystal =

Rock Crystal may refer to:

- a variety of quartz
- Rock Crystal (Fabergé egg), an 1896 an Fabergé egg made for the Russian Imperial family
- Rock Crystal (film), a 2004 film
- Rock Crystal (novella), an 1845 novella by Austrian writer Adalbert Stifter
- Rock crystal vase, a type of decorative vase
- a ewer typical of Fatimid art
- one of a number of gemstones used for hardstone carving
