= Witiko =

Witiko is an ancient given name.

- Witiko of Prčice (1120–1194)
- Witiko of Příběnice (died before 1259)
- Witiko of Prčice and Blankenberg (around 1170–1256)
- Witiko I. of Neuhaus (around 1223–1259)
- Witiko I. of Krumau (around 1220–1277)
- Witiko VI. of Rosenberg (died 1277)
- Witiko II. of Krumau (died 1290)

== See also ==
- Vitek (disambiguation)
- Witiko (novel)
- Witigo
