= The Valley of Stone =

1992 drama film

- Directed by: Maurizio Zaccaro
- Screenplay by: Ermanno Olmi; Maurizio Zaccaro
- Based on: Limestone by Adalbert Stifter
- Produced by: Mario Cecchi Gori; Roberto Cicutto; Vincenzo Di Leo; Marcello Siena
- Starring: Charles Dance; Aleksander Bardini
- Cinematography: Pasquale Rachini
- Edited by: Paolo Cottignola; Maurizio Zaccaro
- Music by: Alessio Vlad; Claudio Capponi
- Release date: 1992
- Language: Italian

The Valley of Stone (Italian: La valle di pietra), also known as Stone Valley and Kalkstein, is a 1992 Italian drama film directed by Maurizio Zaccaro and starring Charles Dance. It premiered at the 49th Venice International Film Festival.

== Cast ==
- Charles Dance as the surveyor
- Aleksander Bardini as the parish priest
  - Miroslav Kadič as the parish priest as a child
- Fabio Bussotti as the surveyor's assistant
- Klara Neroldová as Julia
- Rudolf Hrušínský as Uno
- Miloš Kopecký as Judge Escher
- Miroslav Donutil as Herr Stipetic

== Production ==
The film is an adaptation from the novella Limestone by Adalbert Stifter. It was mostly shot between Bohemia and Tuscany.

== Release ==
The Valley of Stone had its world premiere at the 49th edition of the Venice Film Festival, serving as opening film of the Venice International Film Critics' Week sidebar.

== Reception ==
La Repubblica's film critic Paolo D'Agostini praised the director, owning "a rare directorial talent: the ability to make his films seem richer than they actually are", and paired the film to the "most inspired" Krzysztof Zanussi's works. Deborah Young from Variety also lauded the film, calling it "a tale capable of bringing tears to the eyes", that is directed with "a rock-line solidity" and "radiates a pious simplicity that should appeal [...] all emotionally susceptible viewers". Paolo Mereghetti described it as "a distinctive elegy about sacrifice, remembrance, and friendship that more than once succeeds in touching the viewer's heart".
