= Motley Stones =

Novellas by Adalbert Stifter

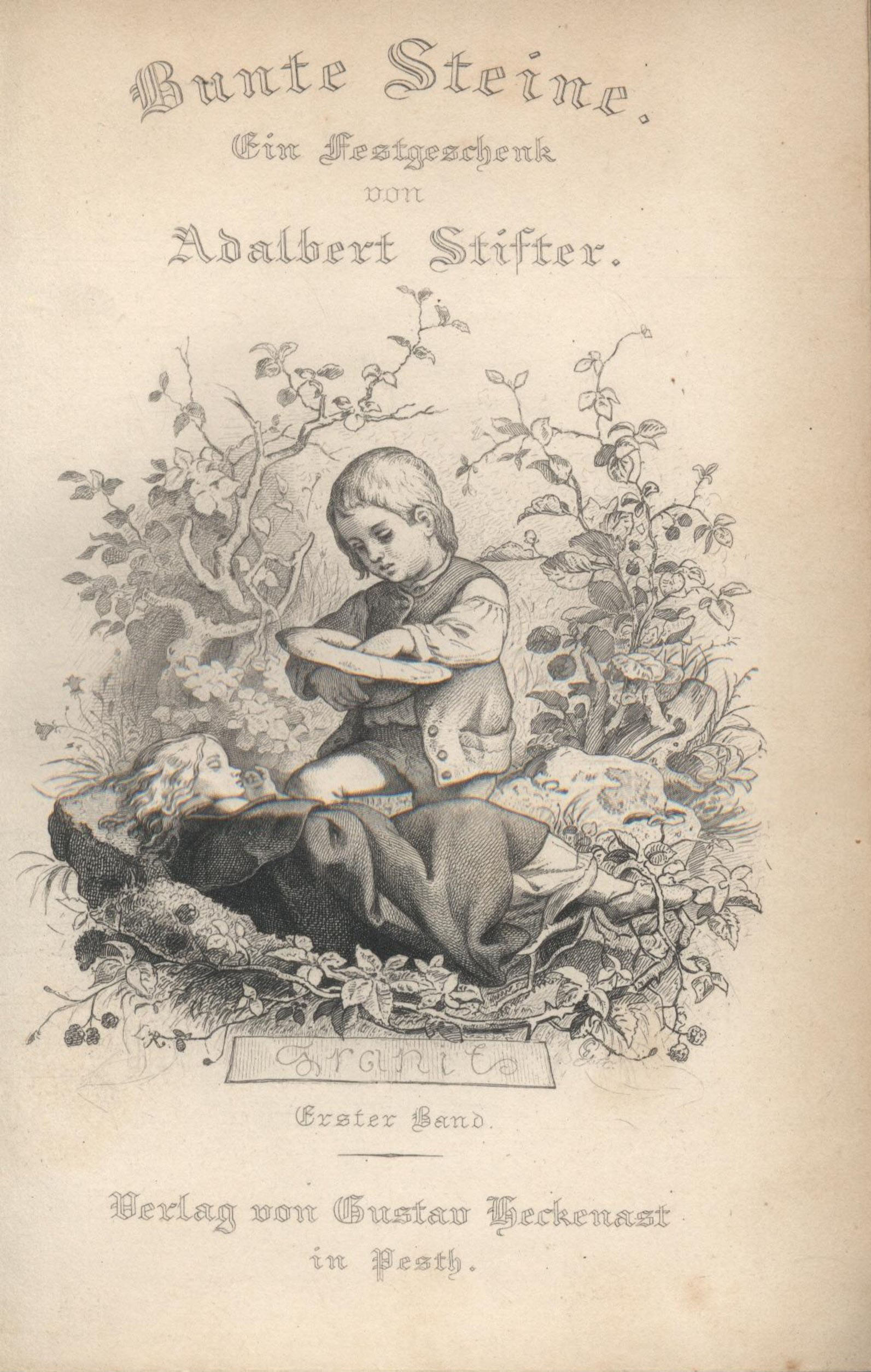
- Bunte Steine 1853 - Frontispiz 1
- Author: Adalbert Stifter
- Original title: Bunte Steine
- Publisher: Gustav Heckenast
- Published: 1853
- No. of books: 6

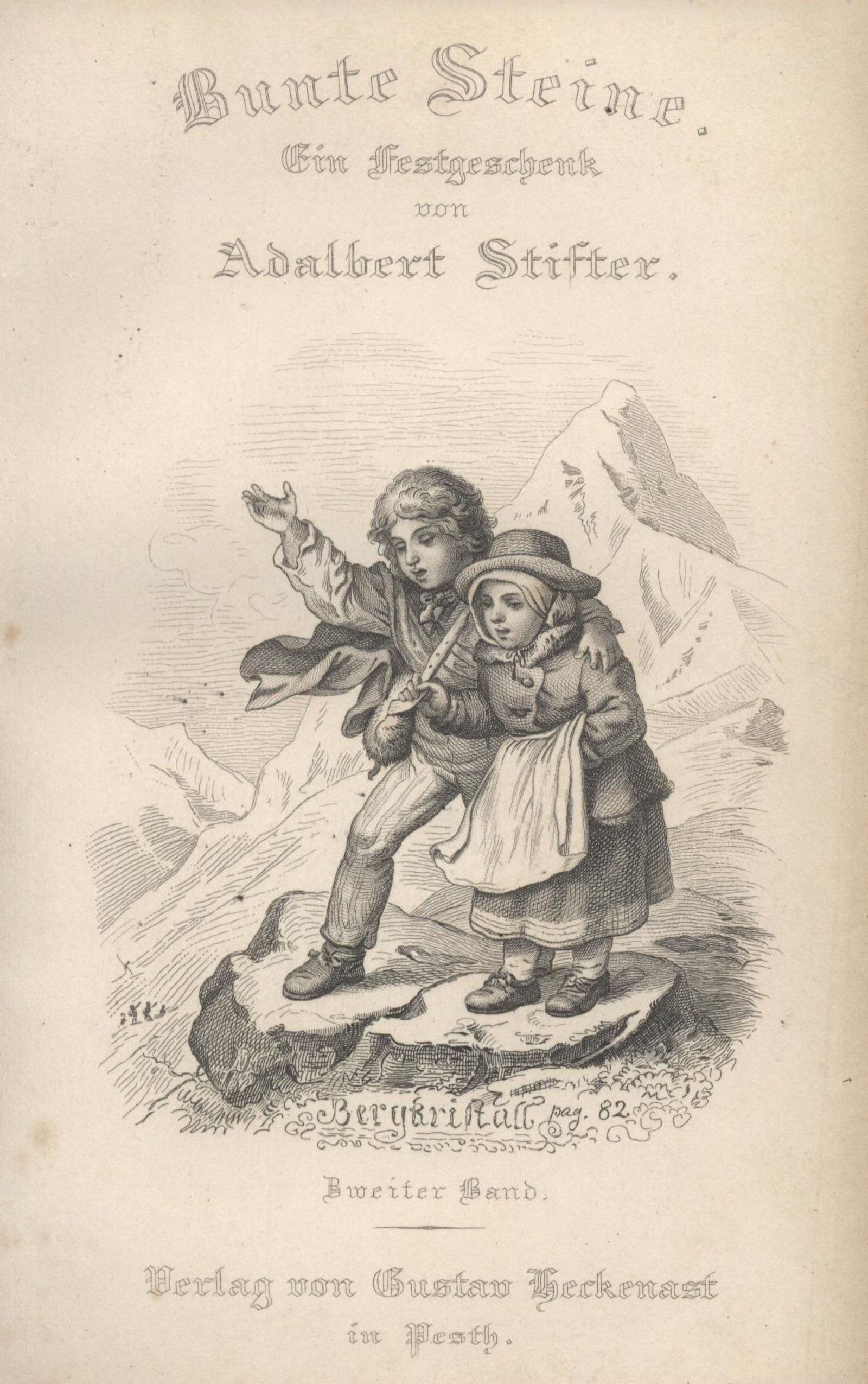
Bunte Steine 1853 - Frontispiz 2

Motley Stones (German: Bunte Steine) is the name of six novellas by Adalbert Stifter, published in two volumes in 1853 by Gustav Heckenast in Pest. The subtitle is: Ein Festgeschenk (a present).

A first complete English translation of the work by Isabel Fargo Cole was released by The New York Review of Books in April 2021.

== Editions ==
Five out of six novellas already existed in preceding editions:

- Granit (Granite) 1848 as Die Pechbrenner (Vergißmeinnicht. Taschenbuch für 1849)
- Kalkstein (Limestone) 1847 as Der arme Wohlthäter (Austria. Österreichischer Universal-Kalender für das Schaltjahr 1848)
- Turmalin 1851 as Der Pförtner im Herrenhause (Libussa. Jahrbuch für 1852)
- Bergkristall (Rock Crystal) 1845 as Der heilige Abend (Die Gegenwart. Politisch literarisches Tageblatt)
- Bergmilch 1843 as Wirkungen eines weißen Mantels (Wiener Zeitschrift für Kunst, Literatur, Theater und Mode)
