= The Road to the Churchyard =

1900 short story by Thomas Mann

- Author: Thomas Mann
- Original title: Der Weg zum Friedhof
- Translators: Helen Tracy Lowe-Porter; David Luke
- Language: German
- Genre: Short Story
- Published: 1900
- Publication place: Germany
- Pages: 10
- ISBN: 9780140033984
- Text: The Road to the Churchyard at Internet Archive

"The Road to the Churchyard" (German: Der Weg zum Friedhof) is a short story by Thomas Mann. It initially appeared in 1900 in Simplicissimus and then in 1903 in an anthology of Mann's six short stories, entitled Six Novellen. It was published in 1922 as "The Way to the Churchyard" in Helen Tracy Lowe-Porter's translation of Mann's Stories of Three Decades, and in 1988 in Death in Venice and Other Stories, translated by David Luke. It has also been translated as "The Path to the Cemetery".

This work parodies Naturalism (e.g. the alcoholism) and Mann's own Nietzschean influences. The recurrent protest present here in a comic vein, as well as in many other Mann's works, is against ignorant vitality epitomized here as the young boy on the bicycle.

== Plot ==
The short story begins with a description of the gravel paved road to the churchyard, as well as of the half-paved highway running parallel to it. During the introduction sequence, various persons travelling it are described, such as soldiers marching, apprentices heading into town, or merchants travelling by cart.

The story then moves onto a physical description of the main character, Lobgott Piepsam. His trousers are too short for him, and his black kid gloves were shabby and his collar frayed. His face is remarkable because of his nose. It is large, covered in marks and, in contrast to his pale face, red. He is going to the church to visit the graves of his wife and children. His children died as infants, and his wife died in childbirth six months before. His demeanor is one of grief. He is an alcoholic, without a family.

Next, a young boy on a bicycle passes him, but stops when Lobgott threatens with a formal complaint to the city government, because he is riding a bike on the church road where that isn't permitted. The boy simply shrugs him off and tries to drive off. Lobgott runs after him, grabs the back of the bike and causes it to fall over. The boy responds by punching him in the chest and further threatening him, should he again stop him.

When the boy drives off, Lobgott proceeds to yell, curse, and scream uncontrollably for riding a bike on the path to the cemetery. A crowd gathers around him, of which he remains unaware, and in the end loses consciousness, with the ambulance driving him away.

== Allegorical interpretation ==
The short story has been interpreted as an allegory for Life. Lobgott, who has suffered tragedy in his life, is headed to the cemetery. On the way there he, a self-destructive man, is intercepted by Life. This bothers Lobgott, who demands life take another way, but is ignored and a chase occurs. The chase can be interpreted as Lobgott trying to prevent Life from taking its course, to get it out of his way, or it can be interpreted as Lobgott expressing his wish to participate in it. Life escapes, Lobgott dies, and his body is unceremoniously shoved into the ambulance, as a loaf into an oven.

== Characters ==
- Lobgott ("Praise God") Piepsam, an alcoholic who recently lost his wife, children and his job. The representation of a rudimentary protest against vitality.
- The boy on the bicycle, called "Life" in the short story, punches Lobgott after Lobgott grabs his bicycle. A trivialization of the blond beast, the embodiment of ruthless energy, Nietzsche's Übermensch.
