= Mountain Crystal =

1949 film

- German film poster
- German: Bergkristall
- Directed by: Harald Reinl
- Written by: Adalbert Stifter (novella); Rose Schonger; Hubert Schonger; Harald Reinl
- Produced by: Josef Plesner; Hubert Schonger
- Starring: Franz Eichberger; Hans Renz; Cilli Greif
- Cinematography: Josef Plesner
- Edited by: Harald Reinl
- Music by: Giuseppe Becce
- Production companies: Hubert Schonger-Filmproduktion; Josef Plesner-Filmproduktion
- Release date: 23 October 1949
- Running time: 86 minutes
- Countries: Austria; West Germany
- Language: German

Mountain Crystal (German: Bergkristall) is a 1949 Austrian-German historical drama film directed by Harald Reinl and featuring a cast of unknown actors including Franz Eichberger, Hans Renz and Cilli Greif. It is a mountain film based on the 1845 novella Rock Crystal by Adalbert Stifter. The film's sets were designed by the Austrian art director Fritz Jüptner-Jonstorff. It was the directorial debut of Reinl who went on to become a successful film director.

== Plot ==
The Tyrolean mountain farmer's son Franz loves Sanna, the daughter of a dyer beyond the mountain ridge. His rival, a hunter, caught him poaching, shot him and left him wounded. The hunter then has a fatal accident in a crevasse, but the villagers consider Franz, who was seriously injured, to be the murderer of the missing hunter. Acquitted for lack of evidence, he is still outlawed by everyone. Only Sanna sticks to him, marries him and is therefore rejected by her father.

Franz is repeatedly confronted with the murder charge, which affects his whole life. Years later, his two children want to look for the Christ child at Christmas time because the bitter father does not tolerate a Christmas tree in his house. They get lost in the glacier region and find shelter in an ice cave, where the hunter's intact body is located. In a joint rescue operation, not only are the children rescued, but Franz is finally rehabilitated and finds his faith in God and the people again.

== Cast ==
- Franz Eichberger as Franz Valteiner
- Hans Renz as Färber von Millsdorf
- Cilli Greif as Färberin, dessen Frau
- Maria Stolz as Sanna, beider Tochter
- Michael Killisch-Horn as Konrad, Knabe
- Hildegard Mayr as Sannele, Mädchen
- Hans Thöni as Franz Valteiners Vater
- Robert Falch as Der Jägersteffel

== Production ==
Harald Reinl worked again with the producers Josef Plesner and Hubert Schonger to realize his first feature film, shot in winter 1948/49. Fritz Jüptner-Jonstorff was responsible for the buildings, the studio was in Kufstein. The exterior shots were taken in Kitzbühel, in the Kaiser Mountains, on the Tuxer Joch, at the Upper Court, and on the Spannagel Glacier. In addition to the actors mentioned by name, farmers, hunters, and shepherds from Tyrol also appear in the film. The premiere took place on 22 October 1949 in Munich, Germany, followed by the screening in Vienna on 23 December the same year.

== See also ==
- Rock Crystal, a 2004 film based on the same novella
