= High Forest =

High Forest may refer to:

- High forest, an ecological and woodland management term for woodland with a range of tree sizes from saplings to ancient trees
- The High Forest, an 1842 novella by Adalbert Stifter
- High Forest (Forgotten Realms), a fictional region in the Forgotten Realms campaign setting
- High Forest Township, Olmsted County, Minnesota
