= Granite (Stifter) =

1854 novella by Adalbert Stifter

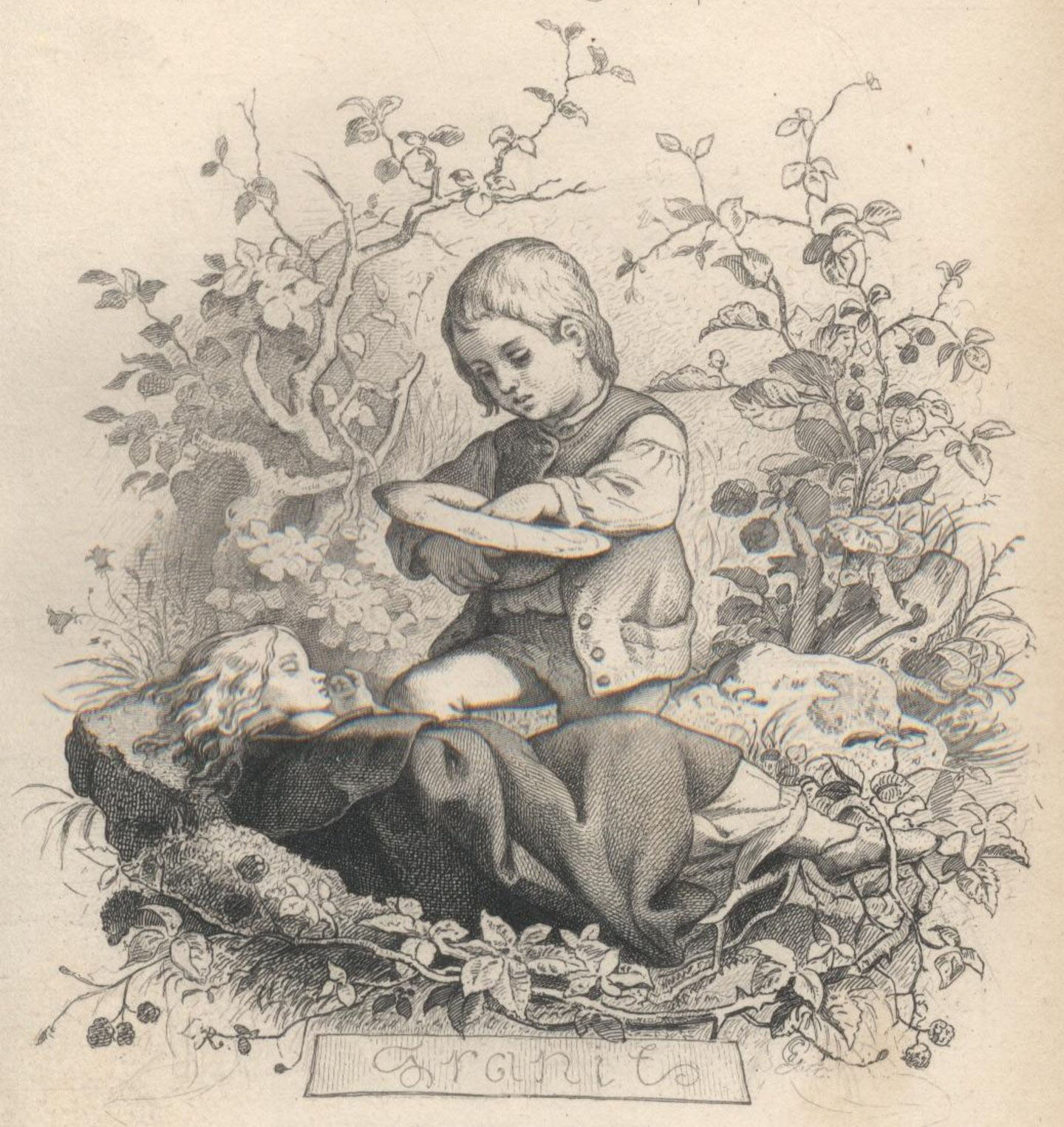
Ludwig Richter's illustration from the first edition of Colourful Stones (Bunte Steine), 1853

"Granite" (original German title: Granit) is a novella by Adalbert Stifter, included in his collection Colourful Stones, 1853 (original title: Bunte Steine). On a walk, the grandfather of the protagonist tells him the story of a family of resin extractors' vain endeavour to escape and the rescue of two children. It is the revised edition of the novella Die Pechbrenner, published in 1848.

== The Story ==
The narrator remembers an event from his childhood, in Bohemian Horní Planá: cart grease was smeared by a passing resin extractor onto his legs. After entering the living room in this way, dirtying the recently mopped floor, he was scolded by his mother. In order to console him, his grandfather took the child for a walk to a neighbouring village, and, on the way, told him a legendary story, which he himself had been told by his own grandfather. A resin extractor wanted to escape the oncoming plague and fled into the deep woods. However, this did not help, and his family died; only the resin extractor’s young son survived. The boy met a little girl who had lost her way, and, under his guidance, they both found their way out of the wood. Some years later, when the youth had become a young man, he sought the girl from that episode and it emerged that she was the Lady of the Castle. He followed her and achieved prosperity and esteem. This is the story of the grandfather.

When the grandfather and the grandson came back home again in the evening, the matter of the cart grease had been forgotten. The narrator concludes with the statement, that he remembers the story in all its details, but not the circumstances in which it all started, so he did not know if and how the resin marks had been removed.

== Structure ==
Although the story is relatively short (in the first edition from 1853 it was 60 pages long), the author uses multiple time levels: the external framework story, which is set in the past, the internal framework story, set during the childhood of the narrator, and the story-within-the story of the grandfather.

== Genesis ==
A first edition, under the title Die Pechbrenner, was published in 1848 in Vergißmeinnicht. Taschenbuch für 1849, Verlag Thomas, Leipzig. According to Stifter himself, he wrote this novella in winter 1847-1848. In a letter to the editor Carl Herloßsohn, he wrote that it was based on a tale by his paternal grandfather (Augustin Stifter, 1744–1834). The writer’s birthplace, indeed, was afflicted by the plague several times: in 1469, 1585, 1680 and 1713. As Stifter’s great-great-grandfather Georg Stüffter was born in 1680, in all probability the plague referred to was the epidemic of 1713. It is also possible that oral sources from 1680 were incorporated into the tale.

While in Die Pechbrenner the fate of the boy’s family who work in resin extraction is described in detail, in "Granite" it is only touched upon. In the first edition, 13 year-old Josef helps the desperate stranger, thus bringing the plague into his family. As a punishment, his father abandons him on an inaccessible rock, thereby condemning him to starvation. Only thanks to the help from two other survivors, the little girl Magdalena and the servant Knut, does he manage to get out of his impossible position. All three find their way out of the wood. The ending of the first edition, as well as the beginning, largely agrees with Granite.

Stifter concluded his revision in January 1852. It is the only novella in Colorful Stones (Bunte Steine) which is in fact shorter in the book version.

== Geographical positioning ==
Stifter uses this novella, as many others, to describe the area around the Bohemian Forest, the place of his childhood. In doing so, he avails himself of several authentic place names. Moreover, as in an historical novel, Stifter gives information about the social structure of South Bohemia in the 18th and 19th centuries.

== Bibliography ==
- Adalbert Stifter: Bunte Steine. Erzählungen. Stuttgart 1994.
- Adalbert Stifter: Sämtliche Erzählungen nach den Erstdrucken, Hg. Wolfgang Matz. Deutscher Taschenbuch Verlag 2005 ISBN 3-423-13369-4
