= Witiko (novel) =

1865–1867 historical novel by Adalbert Stifter

- Cover and title page of first edition of first volume
- Author: Adalbert Stifter
- Language: German
- Genre: Historical novel
- Publisher: C.F. Amelang
- Publication date: 1865–1867
- Media type: Print (Hardcover & Paperback)
- Pages: 900
- LC Class: PT2525 .W53 1967

Witiko is a historical novel by Austrian writer Adalbert Stifter about the founding of the Kingdom of Bohemia in the 12th-century. Published in several volumes from 1865 to 1867, Witiko takes its name from its protagonist, the knight Witiko of Prčice, father of the Vítkovci dynasty. His descendants would come to play such an important role at the Prague royal court that they were called "the real lords of the kingdom."
