= Brigitta (novella) =

1843 novella by Adalbert Stifter

- Author: Adalbert Stifter
- Language: German
- Publisher: Pfautsch & Co.
- Publication date: 1843
- Publication place: Austria; Saxony
- Pages: 53 (1843); 108 (1847)

Brigitta is an 1843 novella by the Austrian writer Adalbert Stifter. It is about a man's visit to a friend's estate in Hungary, where he gradually learns about the friend's complicated relationship with a peculiar woman named Brigitta.

The novella first appeared in 1843 in the literary almanac Gedenke Mein! Taschenbuch für 1844, published by Pfautsch & Co. in Vienna and Leipzig. A revised version was published in Stifter's fourth volume of Studien in 1847.

The story was the basis for the 1982 Austrian and Hungarian television film Brigitta directed by Wolfgang Glück and the 1994 German feature film Brigitta directed by Dagmar Knöpfel.
