= Landštejn Castle =

13th-century castle in the Czech Republic

Landštejn
- Staré Město pod Landštejnem, South Bohemian Region in the Czech Republic
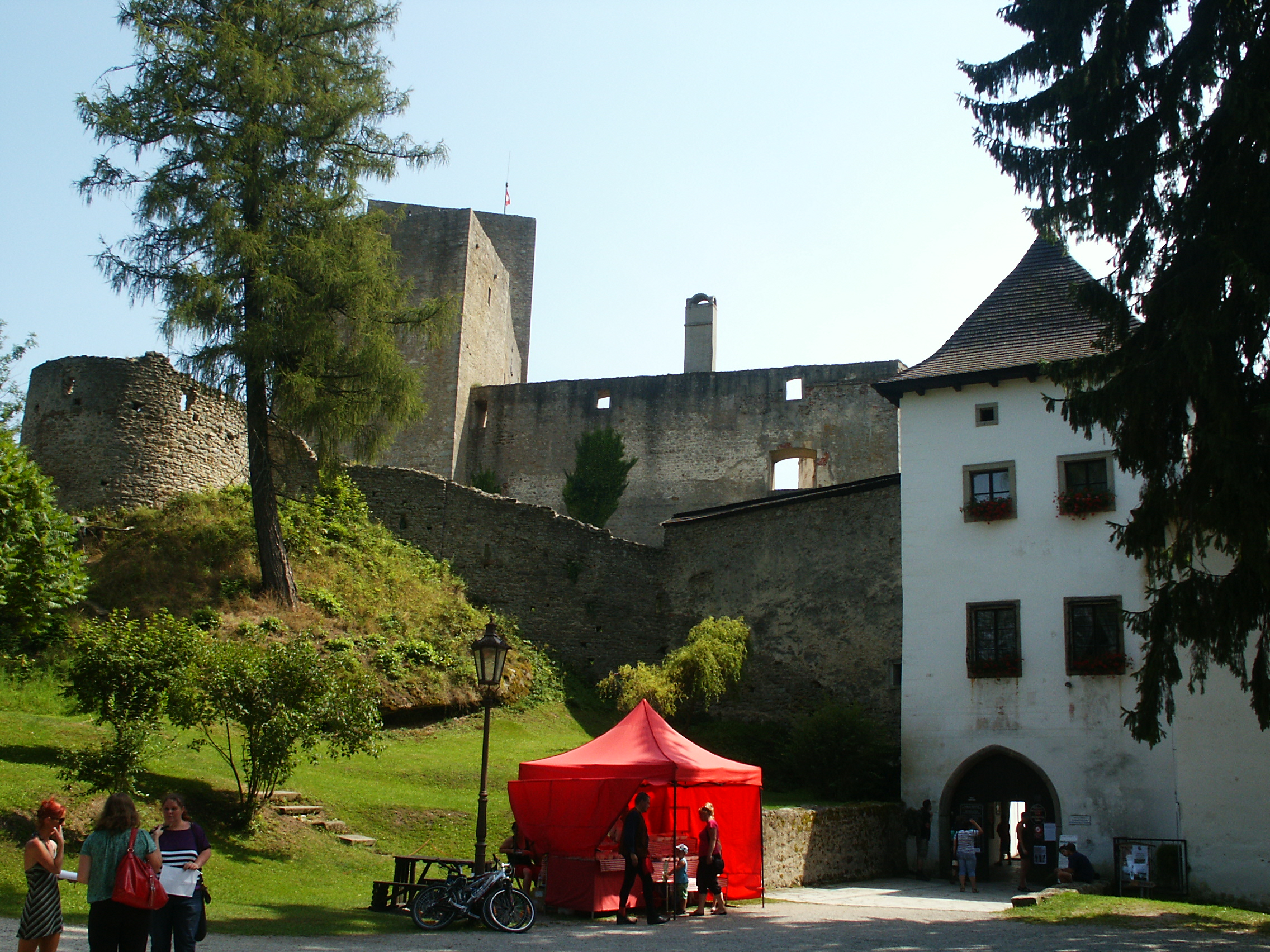

Site information
- Type: Castle

Location
- Location in the Czech Republic
- Coordinates: 49°1′26″N 15°13′50″E

Landštejn Castle (Czech: hrad Landštejn) is a 13th-century castle in Staré Město pod Landštejnem in Jindřichův Hradec District in the South Bohemian Region of the Czech Republic. The first written record of the castle is from 1231, at which time it was the largest Romanesque castle in the Czech lands. It is one of the oldest and best preserved such structures in Europe. The two large towers are connected by a wall defining the upper castle and its courtyard. The six-story southern tower is the main tower and is fully preserved, including a gate in the western wall.

== History ==
Archaeologists have uncovered evidence of an even older castle under Landštejn in Pomezí, and it is thought the Landštejn of today was built by the Moravian Přemyslides as their military base. When and how the Vítkovci came into possession of Landštejn is not recorded. The Lords of Landštejn won increasing political influence through acts of personal bravery. Under Vilém of Landštejn their estates, as well as the castle and Nová Bystřice, included Třeboň, Lomnice and Nové Hrady. After initial resistance, Vilém accepted a feudal obligation in 1317 and became adviser to King John of Bohemia. He was also on friendly terms with King Charles IV, who supported him in his violent conflict with his distant relative, Jindřich of Hradec.

In 1381, Konrád Krajíř of Krajka obtained the estate, which then belonged to his family for nearly two centuries. They strengthened the fortifications substantially and built new palaces round the five-cornered courtyard. In 1579, the last member of the Krajíř family, Anna Roupovská, sold Landštejn to Stěpán of Eincing, and there were then several owners in quick succession. The Herbersteins owned the castle from 1685 till 1816 when the last member of the family, Count Josef died. In 1771, lightning struck one of the towers and the castle was burnt out, and fell into ruin, providing building material for the local population. After a lengthy dispute over inheritance, the abandoned castle fell to Baron Ferdinand Sternbach in 1846.

== Present ==
Today Landštejn is one of the best preserved examples of medieval fortification systems. The oldest, Romanesque part with a palace built between two defensive towers is unique in Bohemia. The later completion of the Gothic defense system with living quarters in the donjon gave the castle another courtyard. The lofty Renaissance palace of the Krajíř family and Baroque artillery bastions ended the building styles carried out in four stages of development.

== In literature ==
The German poet, Friedrich Schiller, set his play The Robbers (1781) in the surrounding forests.

== Family curse ==
The ancestress of the Landštejn family was also known as the White Lady. She is said to have punished all her descendants who did not keep the Lord's Commandments by cursing them with serious illness. When she was exorcized from Landštejn, she moved to Borotín near Tábor and placed a curse on the Lords of Landštejn, which is said to have caused the powerful and famous family to perish.

== Gallery ==
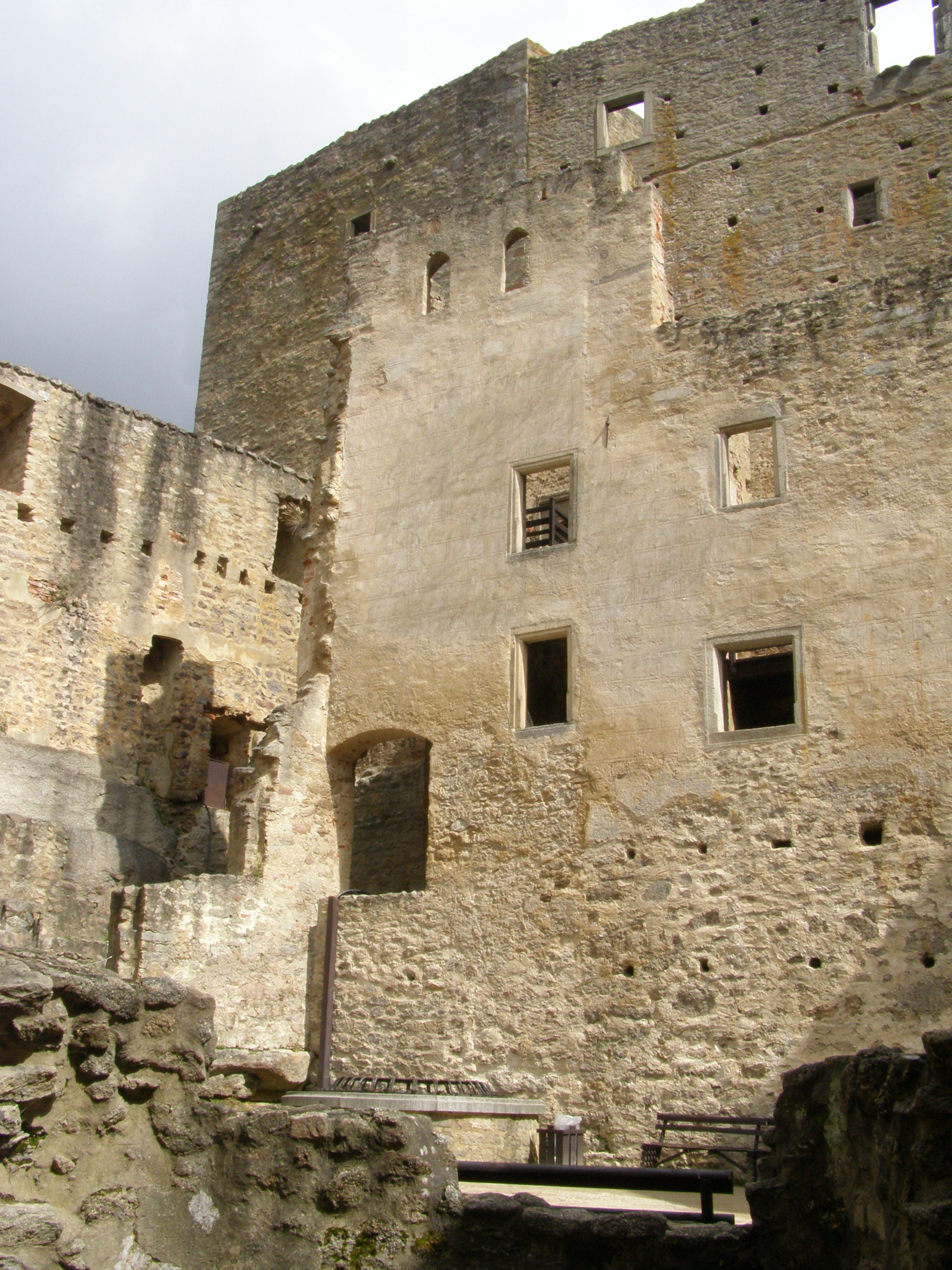

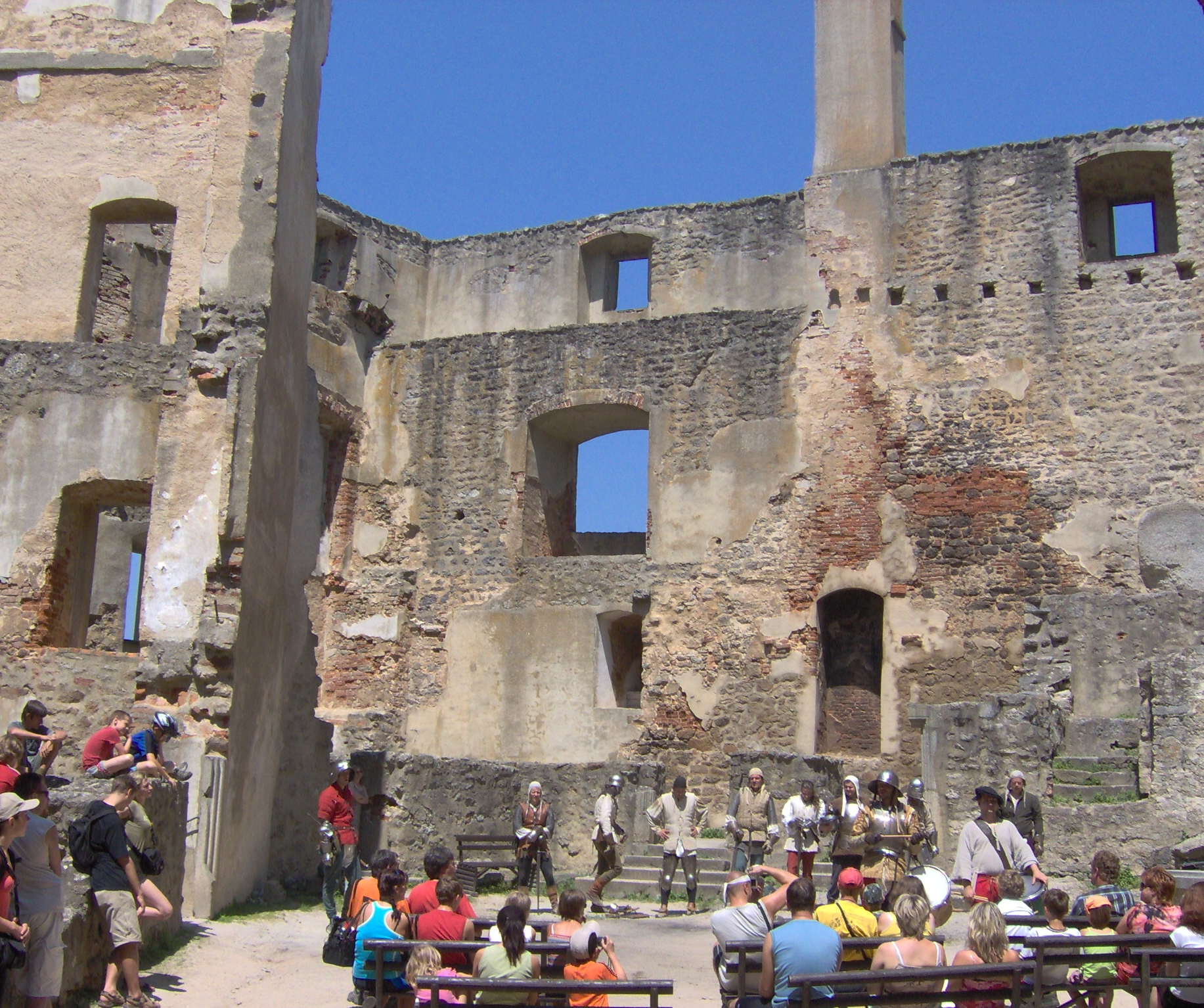

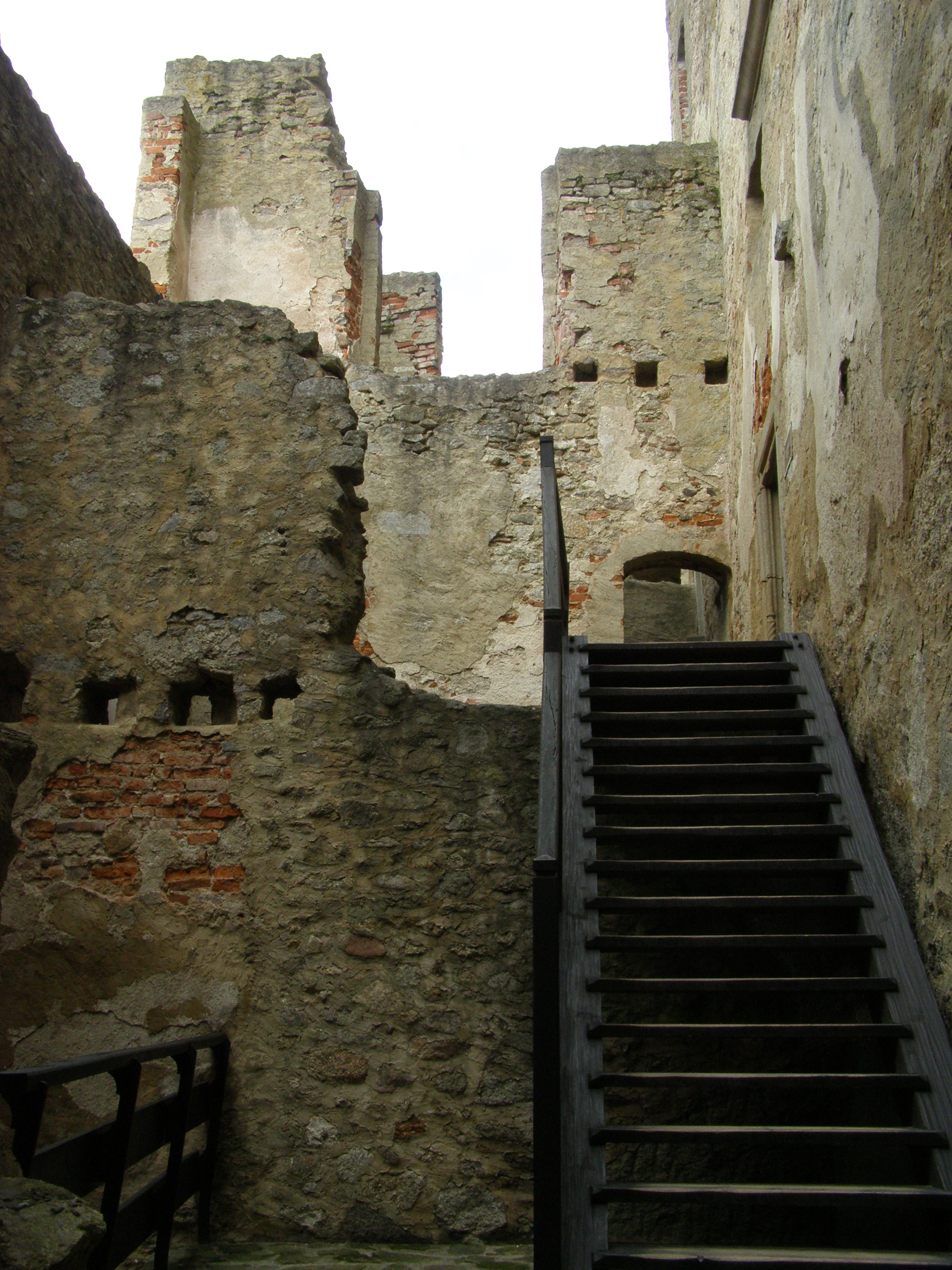

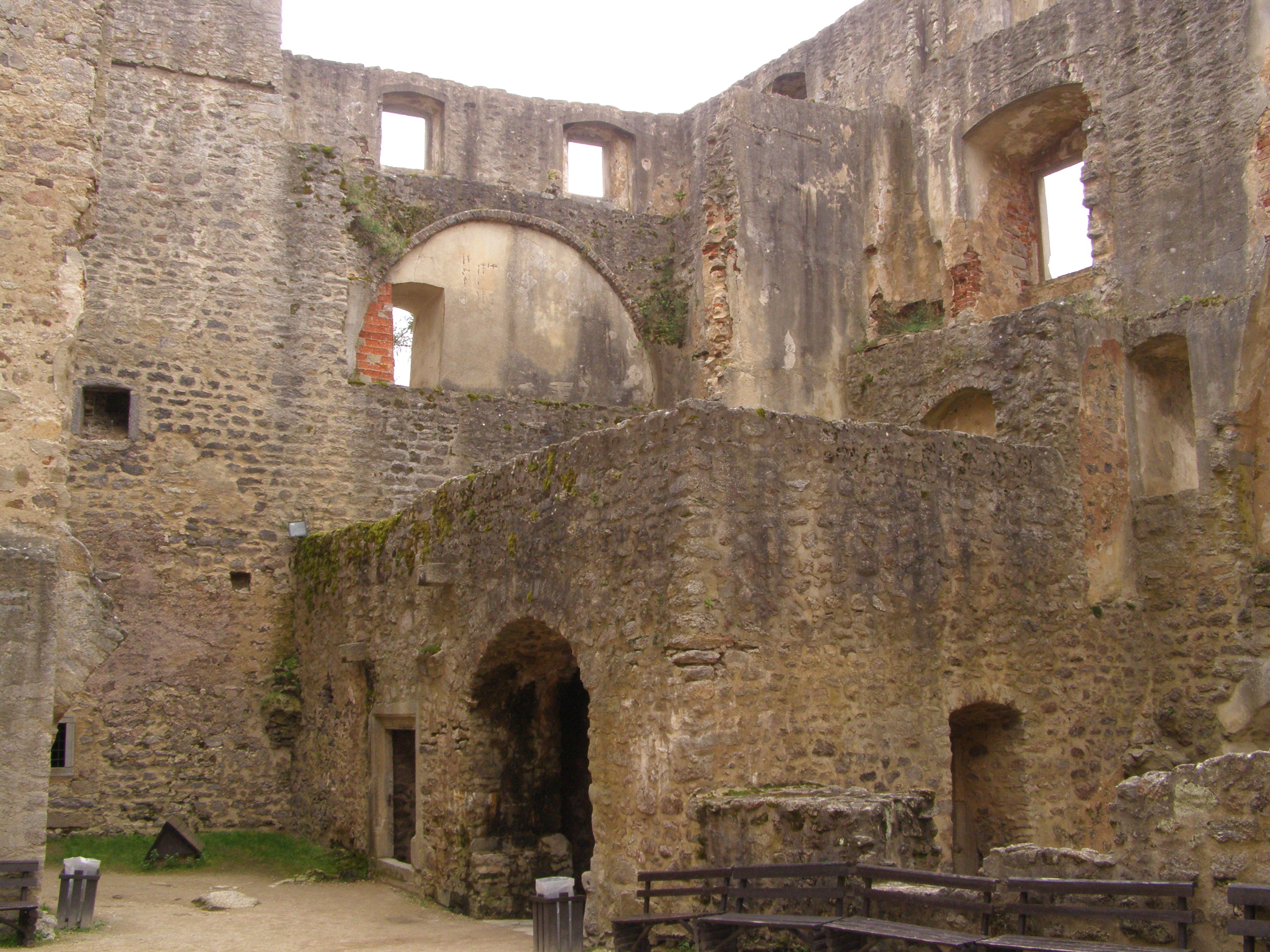

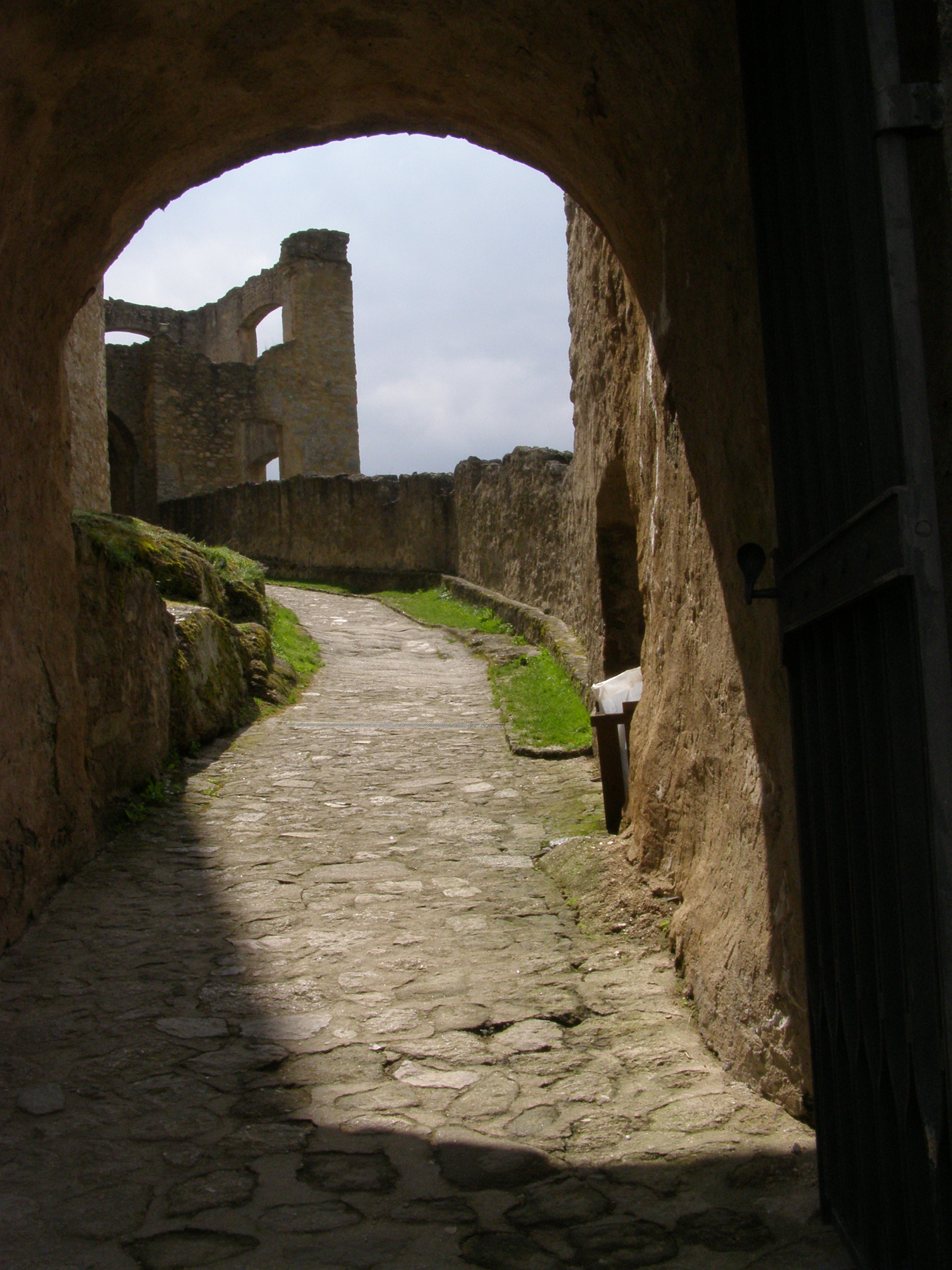

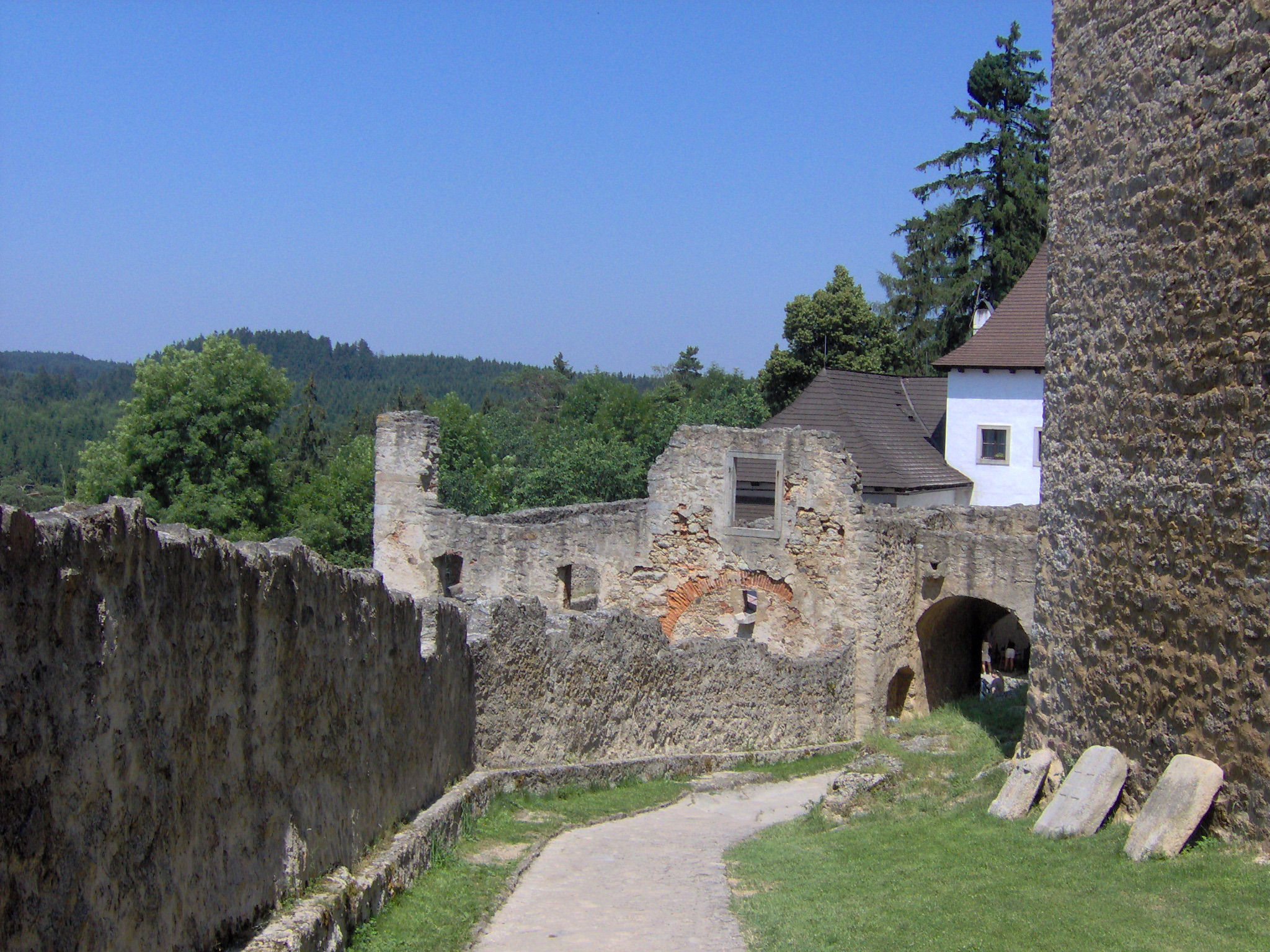

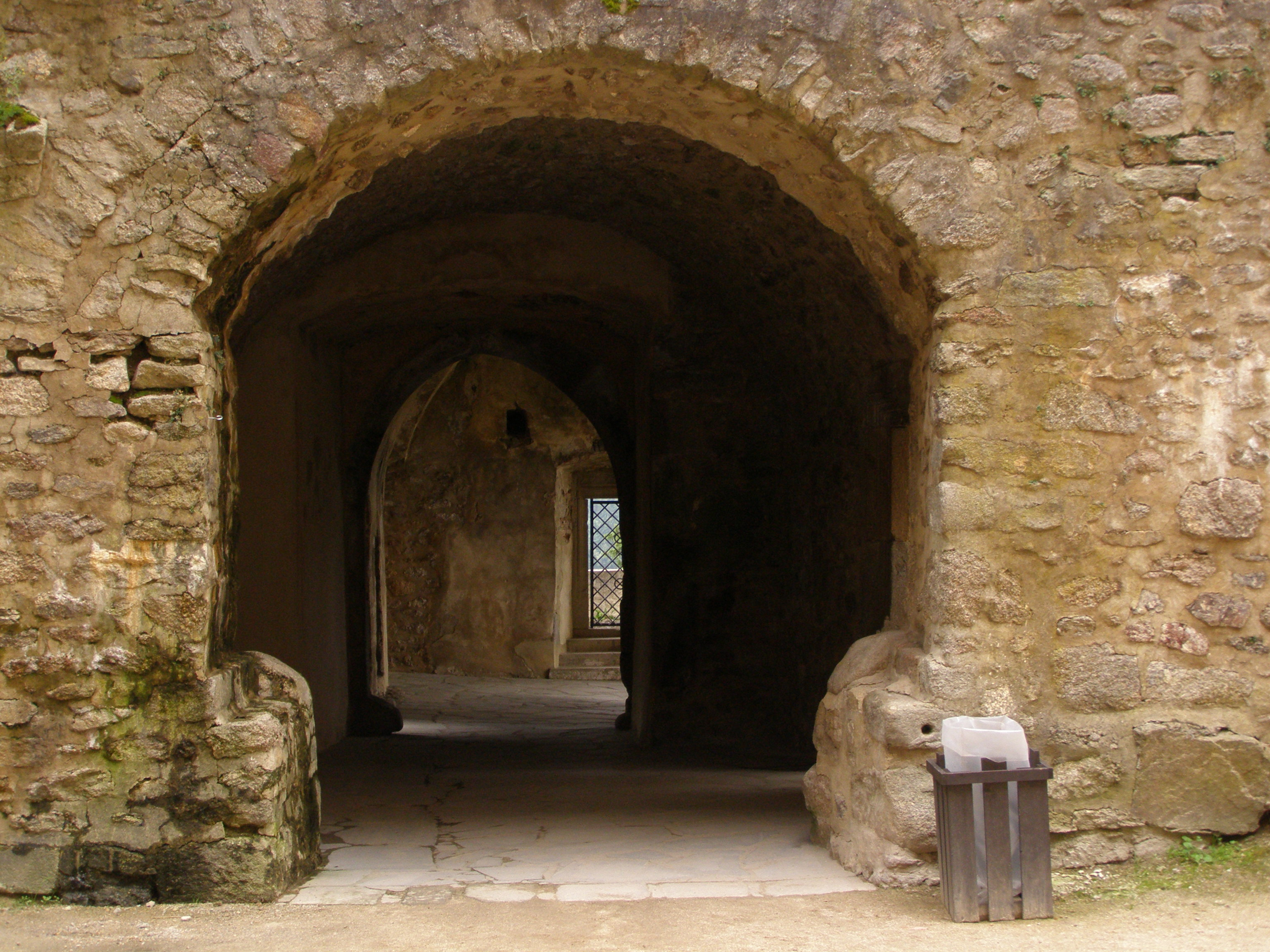

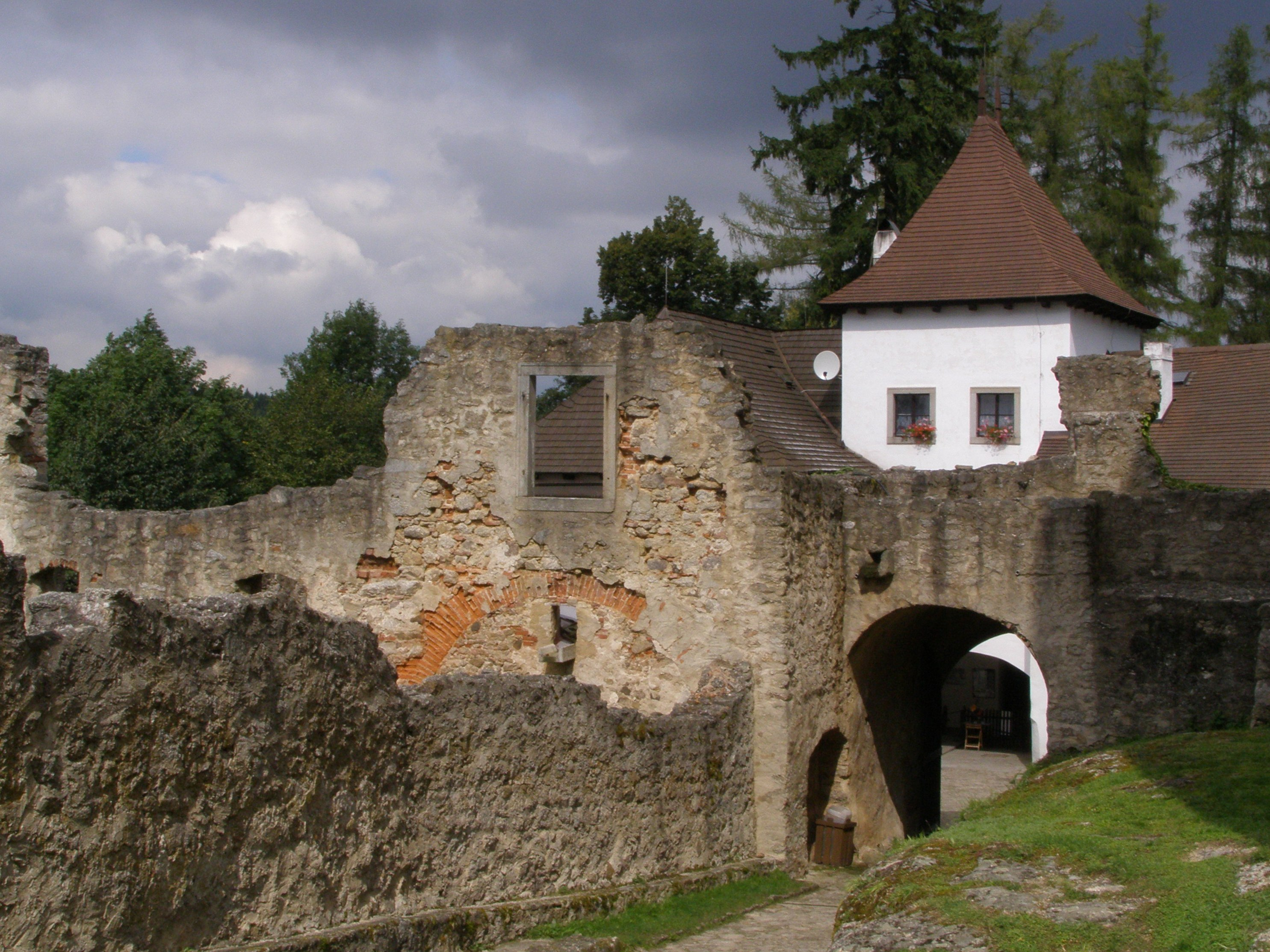

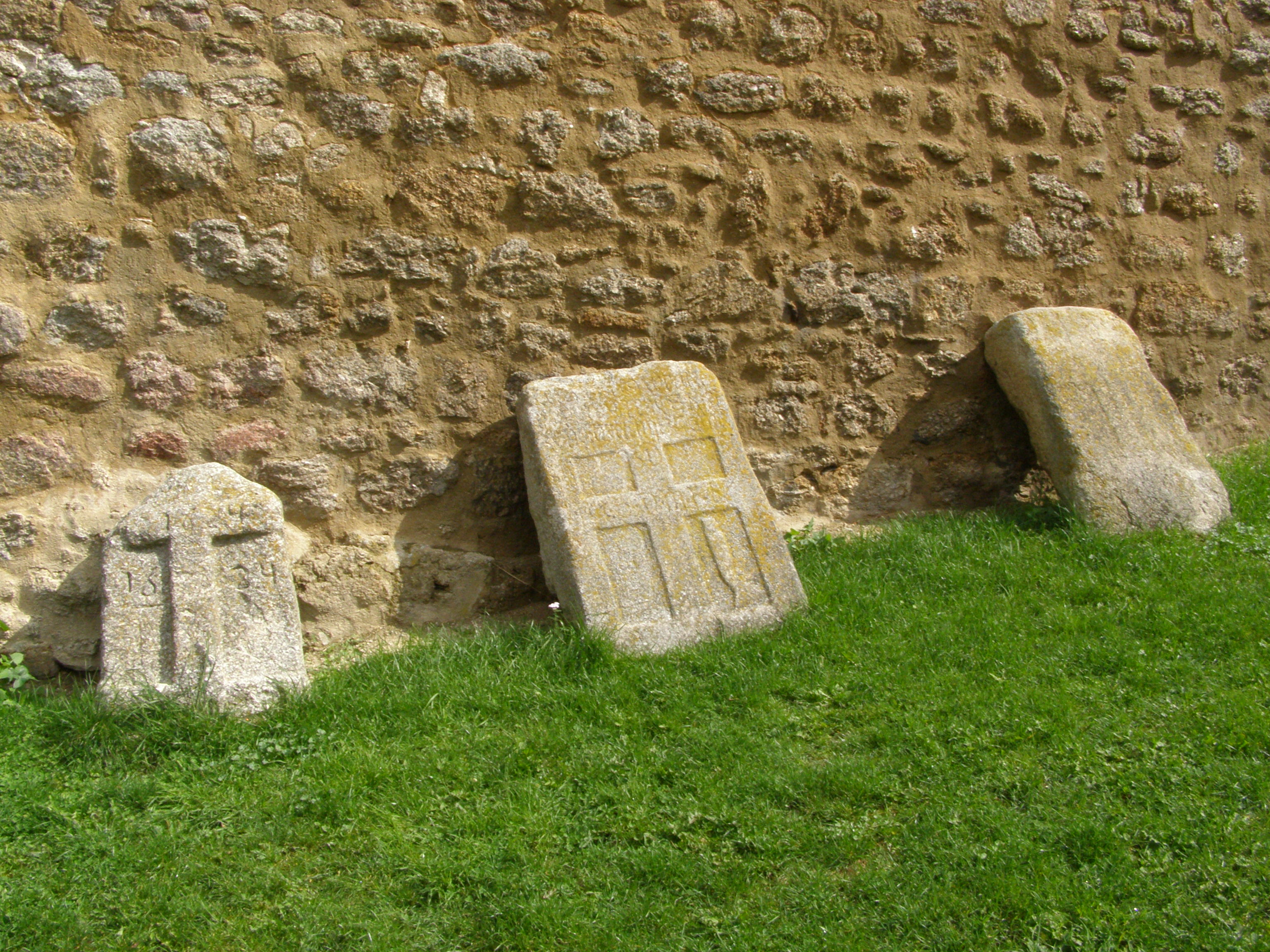

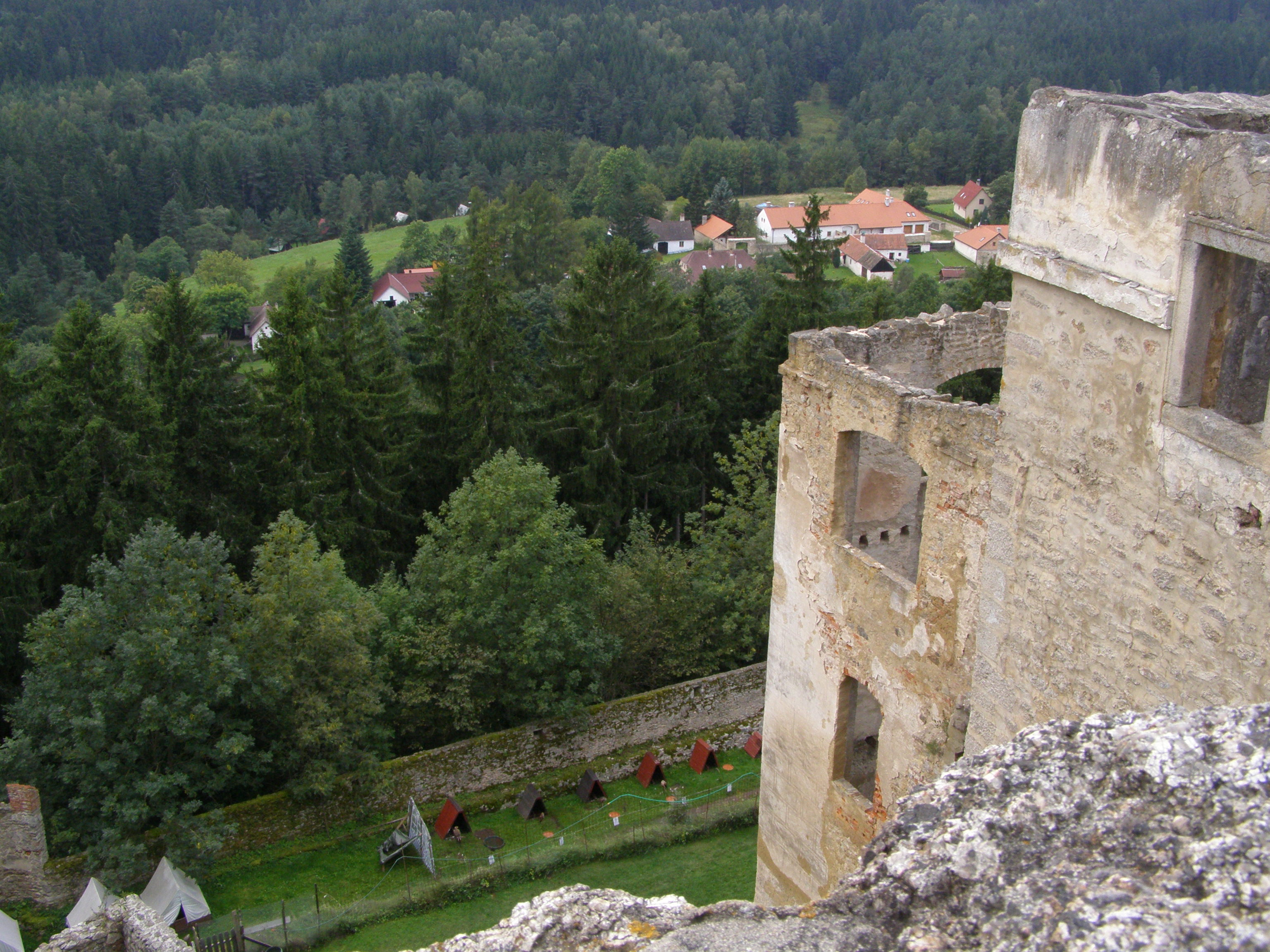

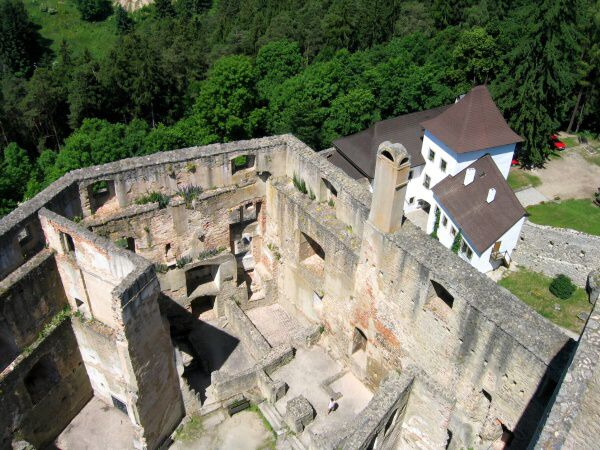
View from the main tower on the courtyard
