= Rock Crystal (film) =

2004 film by Joseph Vilsmaier

Rock Crystal (German: Bergkristall) is a 2004 German mountain film directed by Joseph Vilsmaier, based on the Christmas novella Rock Crystal by Adalbert Stifter. It was produced by Markus Zimmer for Perathon Film und Fernseh.

== Cast ==
- Dana Vávrová as Susanne
- Daniel Morgenroth as Sebastian
- François Goeske as Konrad
- Josefina Vilsmaier as Sanna
- Max Tidof as vicar Ernst
- Christian Nickel as Bürgermeister Andreas
- Andreas Nickl as woodcutter Michl
- Michael Schönborn as teacher
- Jürgen Schornagel as dyer
- Tom Wlaschiha as Schafhirte Philipp
- Katja Riemann as Karin
- Herbert Knaup as Paul

== Reception ==
Tilman Krause of Die Welt criticised the film for not trusting the source material and adding a subplot about a troubled marriage, but wrote that the film is "not entirely a failure", praising how the simplified acting style suits the Christmas theme and how the snow is captured on film. Cornelia Niedermeier of Der Standard was critical of the changes from the original story, writing that the film "has a lot to do with hollow pathos and images overloaded with clichés, but little to do with Adalbert Stifter".

== See also ==
- Mountain Crystal, a 1949 film based on the same novella
