= The Bachelors (Stifter novel) =

1844 novel by Adalbert Stifter

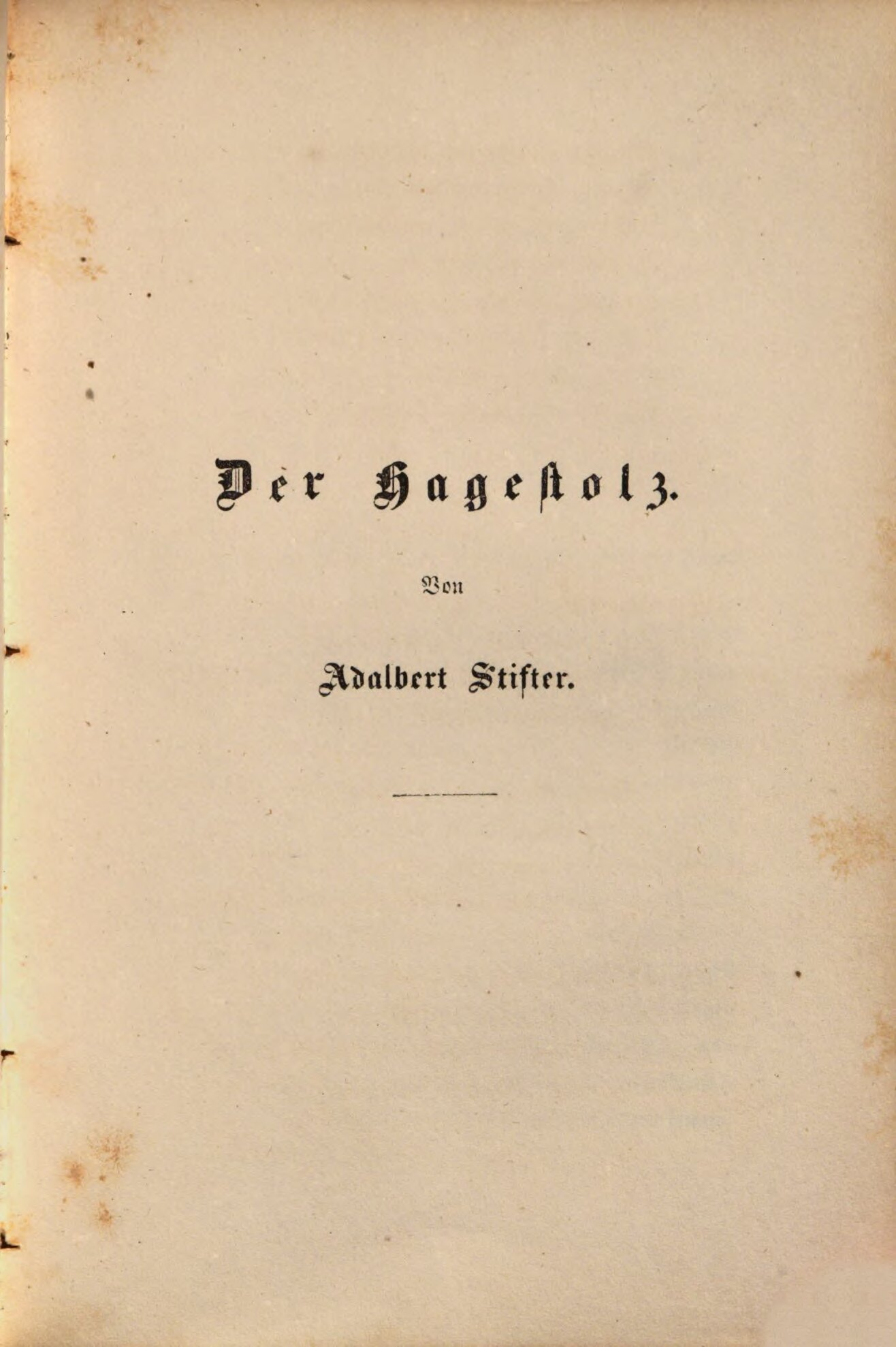
- Title page from Iris
- Author: Adalbert Stifter
- Original title: Der Hagestolz
- Language: German
- Publication date: 1844
- Publication place: Austria
- Pages: 118 (1844); 348 (1850)

The Bachelors (German: Der Hagestolz, lit. 'The Bachelor'), also published as The Recluse, is a novel by the Austrian writer Adalbert Stifter. It was published as a novella in the anthology series Iris in 1844 and as a full-length novel in 1850.

== Plot ==
The young man Victor is an orphan and has promised himself to never get married. He visits his only known relative, a reclusive and misanthropic uncle who lives alone in a decaying mansion on an island. The two men are initially at odds but slowly come to understand and respect each other. The night before Victor leaves, the uncle has an outburst where he urges Victor to marry in order to avoid the lonely and miserable life he has lived. He was in his youth in love with Ludmilla, who then became Victor's foster mother. Victor goes back to Ludmilla and eventually marries her daughter.

== Publication ==
A version of The Bachelors was first published as a novella in Iris. Taschenbuch für das Jahr 1845, which appeared in late 1844. It was intended for the previous year's edition of Iris, but grew too long so Stifter had to make a shorter version, which was ready for the 1845 edition. A full-length novel version of the story was published in 1850 as volume 5 of Stifter's Studien series.

== Reception ==
The scholar Eric A. Blackall wrote that The Bachelors suffers from bad composition. Especially in the first half, Stifter frequently "loses himself in description of environment and setting", and there are overly long and didactic dialogues, but this changes in the second half, which is "one of Stifter's most impressive pieces of writing", and consistently "vigorous and powerful".
