= Staré Město pod Landštejnem =

- Market town
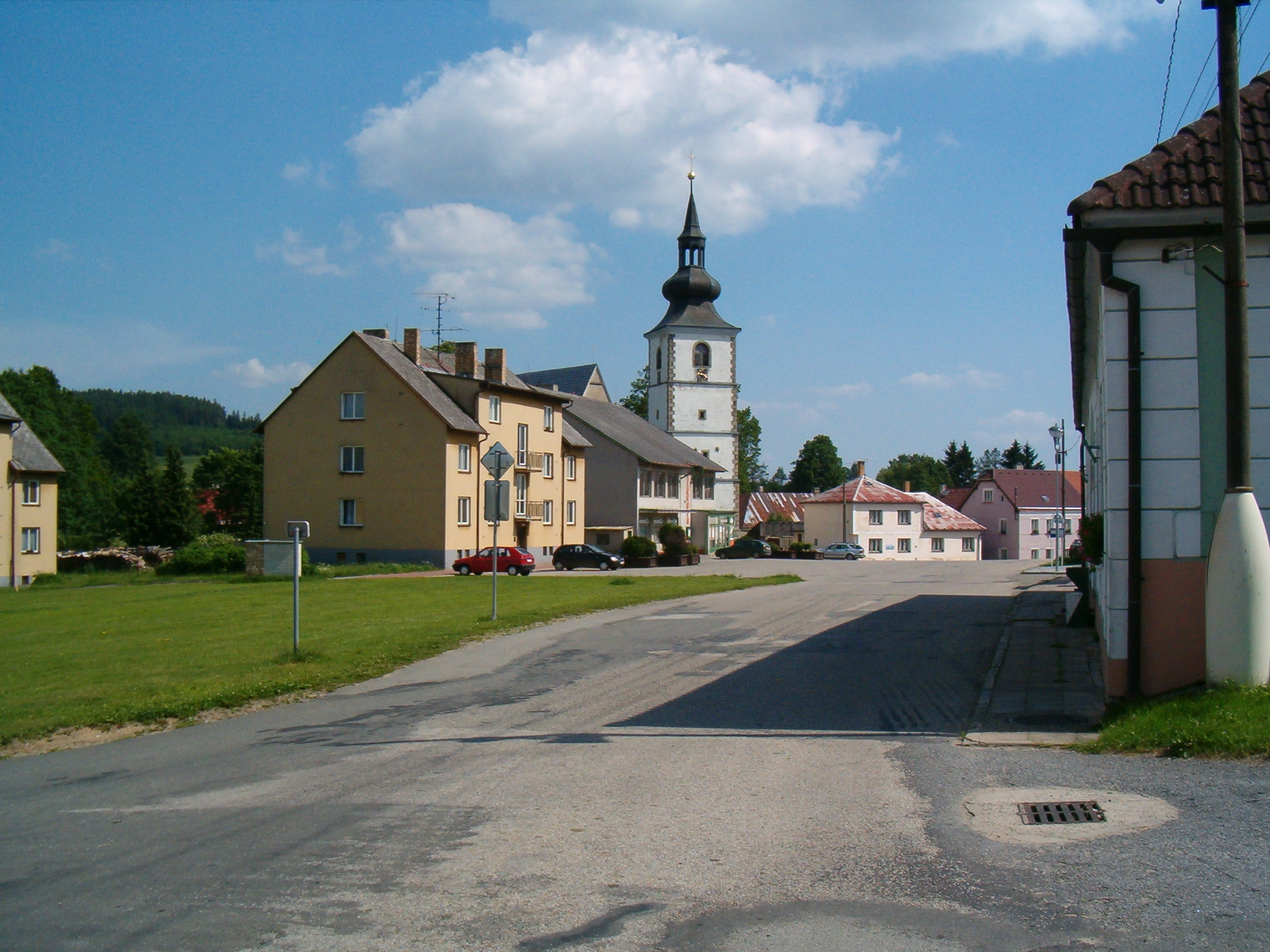
- Centre of Staré Město pod Landštejnem

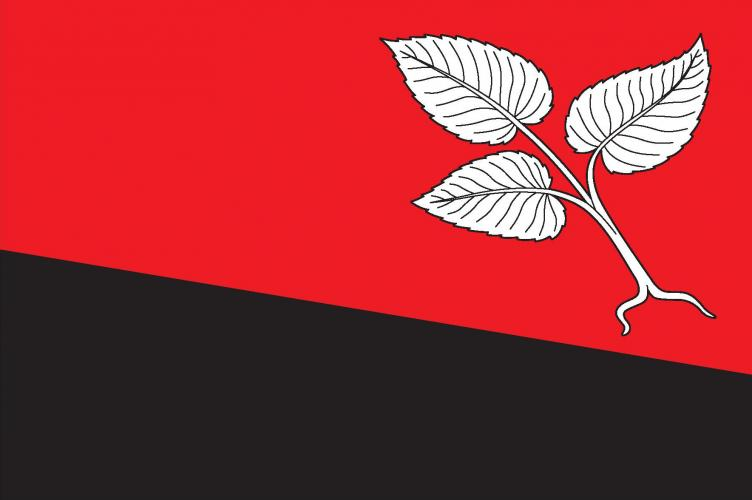
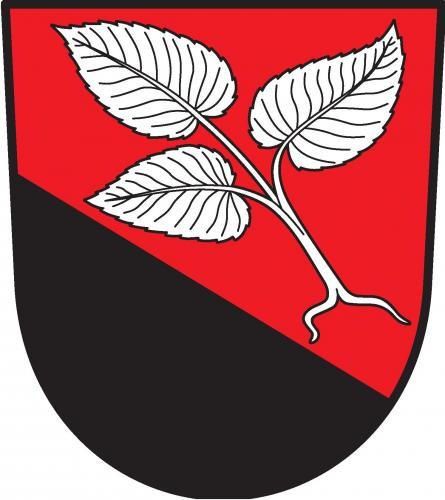
- Flag Coat of arms

- Location in the Czech Republic
- Coordinates: 49°0′12″N 15°15′15″E
- Country: Czech Republic
- Region: South Bohemian
- District: Jindřichův Hradec
- First mentioned: 1495

Area
  - Total: 69.25 km^{2} (26.74 sq mi)
- Elevation: 545 m (1,788 ft)

Population (2026-01-01)
  - Total: 466
  - Density: 6.73/km^{2} (17.4/sq mi)
- Time zone: UTC+1 (CET)
  - Summer (DST): UTC+2 (CEST)
- Postal codes: 378 81, 378 82
- Website: www.staremestopl.cz

Staré Město pod Landštejnem (Czech pronunciation: [ˈstarɛː ˈmɲɛsto ˈpod lantʃtɛjnɛm]; German: Altstadt) is a market town in Jindřichův Hradec District in the South Bohemian Region of the Czech Republic. It has about 500 inhabitants.

== Administrative division ==
Staré Město pod Landštejnem consists of eight municipal parts (in brackets population according to the 2021 census):

- Staré Město pod Landštejnem (385)
- Dobrotín (11)
- Landštejn (10)
- Návary (3)
- Podlesí (13)
- Pomezí (2)
- Veclov (9)
- Vitíněves (3)

== Etymology ==
In Czech, the name literally means 'old town below Landštejn'.

== Geography ==
Staré Město pod Landštejnem is located about 23 kilometres (14 mi) southeast of Jindřichův Hradec and 55 km (34 mi) east of České Budějovice. The municipal territory borders with Austria and is adjacent to the municipality of Kautzen. It is situated in the Javořice Highlands. The highest point is the Uhliště hill at 702 m (2,303 ft) above sea level. The Pstruhovec Stream flows through the market town. The upper course of the Dračice River flows through the northwestern part of the municipal territory and supplies the fishponds Horní Žišpašský rybník and Dolní Žišpašský rybník there.

== History ==
The village, originally named Landštejn, was founded around 1170. The village belonged to the Landštejn estate. From 1381 to 1579, it was owned by the Krajíř of Krajek family. In the 14th century, the village grew and became a market village. At the end of the 15th century, it was promoted to a market town. The first written mention of Staré Město is from 1495. In 1952, it was renamed Staré Město pod Landštejnem.

== Demographics ==
Historical population

Year	Pop.	±%
1869	3,882	—
1880	3,884	+0.1%
1890	3,701	−4.7%
1900	3,595	−2.9%
1910	3,356	−6.6%

Year	Pop.	±%
1921	2,895	−13.7%
1930	2,544	−12.1%
1950	1,072	−57.9%
1961	786	−26.7%
1970	626	−20.4%

Year	Pop.	±%
1980	649	+3.7%
1991	567	−12.6%
2001	552	−2.6%
2011	505	−8.5%
2021	436	−13.7%

Source: Censuses

== Transport ==
There are no railways or major roads passing through the market town.

== Sights ==
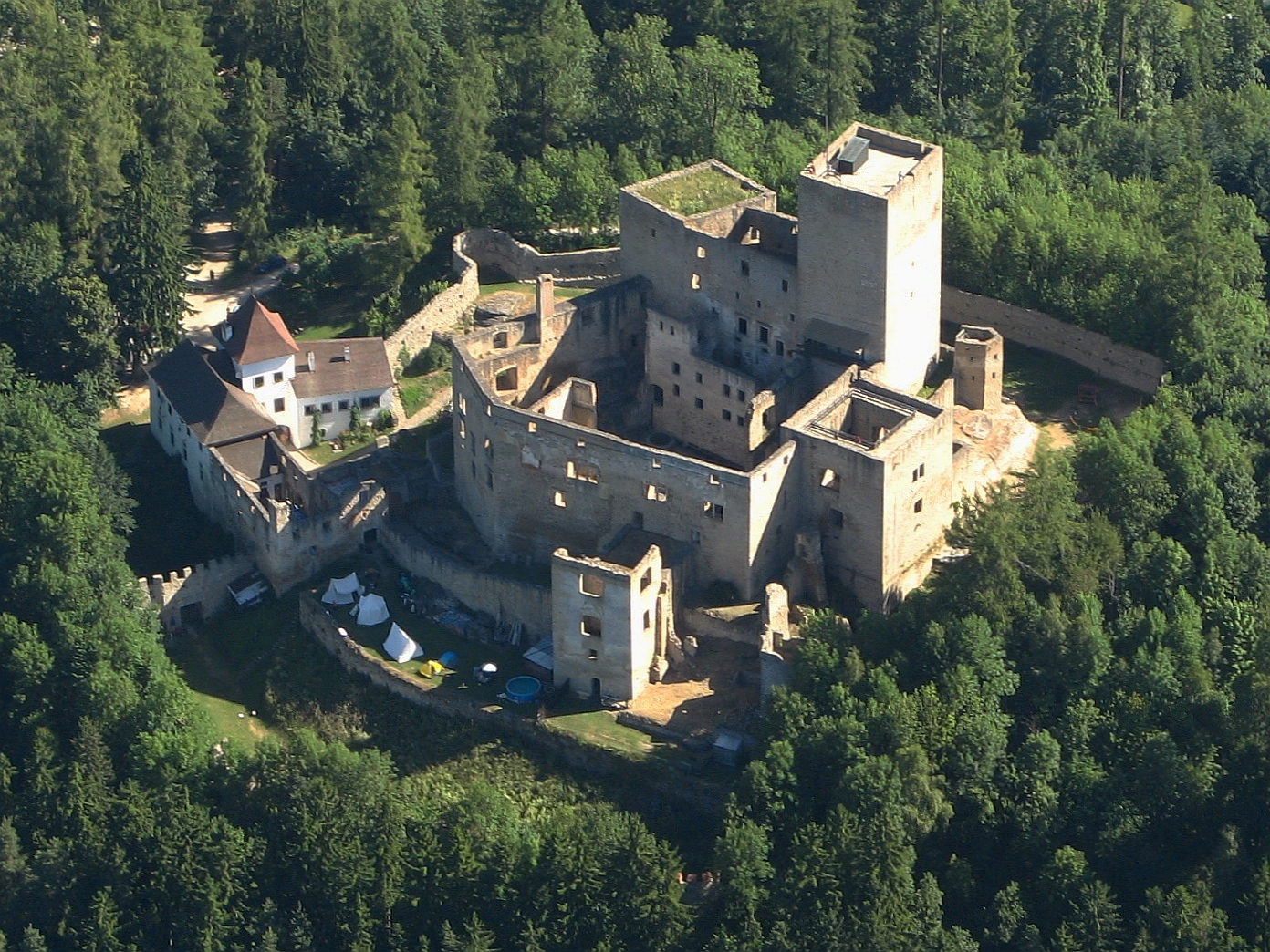
Landštejn Castle

The main landmark is the Landštejn Castle. It is a Romanesque castle from the 13th century, rebuilt in the Gothic and Renaissance styles. The Romanesque core with two towers and the wall of the Romanesque palace has been preserved. Today the castle is owned by the state and offers guided tours.

The Church of the Assumption of the Virgin Mary is originally an early Gothic building, which was extended and rebuilt at the turn of the 15th and 16th centuries. The separate bell tower next to the church was built in the first half of the 16th century.

A valuable building is the Church of Saint John the Baptist in Pomezí. It is originally a Romanesque church, rebuilt around 1300. It belongs to the oldest churches in the region.

== Twin towns – sister cities ==
Staré Město pod Landštejnem is twinned with:

- Rača (Bratislava), Slovakia
