= Witiko of Prčice =

Bohemian nobleman (d. 1194)

Witiko dividing his property among his sons (from the Division of the Roses)

Witiko or Vitico of Prčice (Czech: Vítek z Prčice, German: Witiko von Purschitz; c. 1120–1194) was a Bohemian nobleman and liensman of the Přemyslid dynasty. He was the ancestor of the Vítkovci family and the subject of the historical novel Witiko by Adalbert Stifter published in 1867.

== Life ==
A noble Vítek (diminutive from Vít, Vitus) descending from Prčice south of Prague was first documented in an 1134 deed. An alleged relation with the Italian Orsini family, as claimed by his descendants John (1434–1472) and Jošt of Rosenberg (1430–1467), has not been established.

In 1165 he appeared as a cup-bearer, from 1169 to 1175 as seneschal at the court of Duke Vladislaus II of Bohemia. In the winter of 1172 he accompanied the Bishop of Prague on two diplomatic missions to Emperor Frederick Barbarossa. In 1177 he served as a burgrave in Kladsko near the border with Poland. He also fought in the struggle for the Bohemian throne between Duke Vladislaus' eldest son Frederick (Bedřich) and his Přemyslid cousin Soběslav II.

In 1184 Vitico was appointed burgrave in Prácheňsko and was able to acquire extended estates in South Bohemia. He again appeared at the court of Duke Conrad II in 1189. Through his four sons, he was the progenitor of several Vítkovci branches, among them the House of Rosenberg (Rožmberk).
