= The High Forest =

1842 novella by Adalbert Stifter

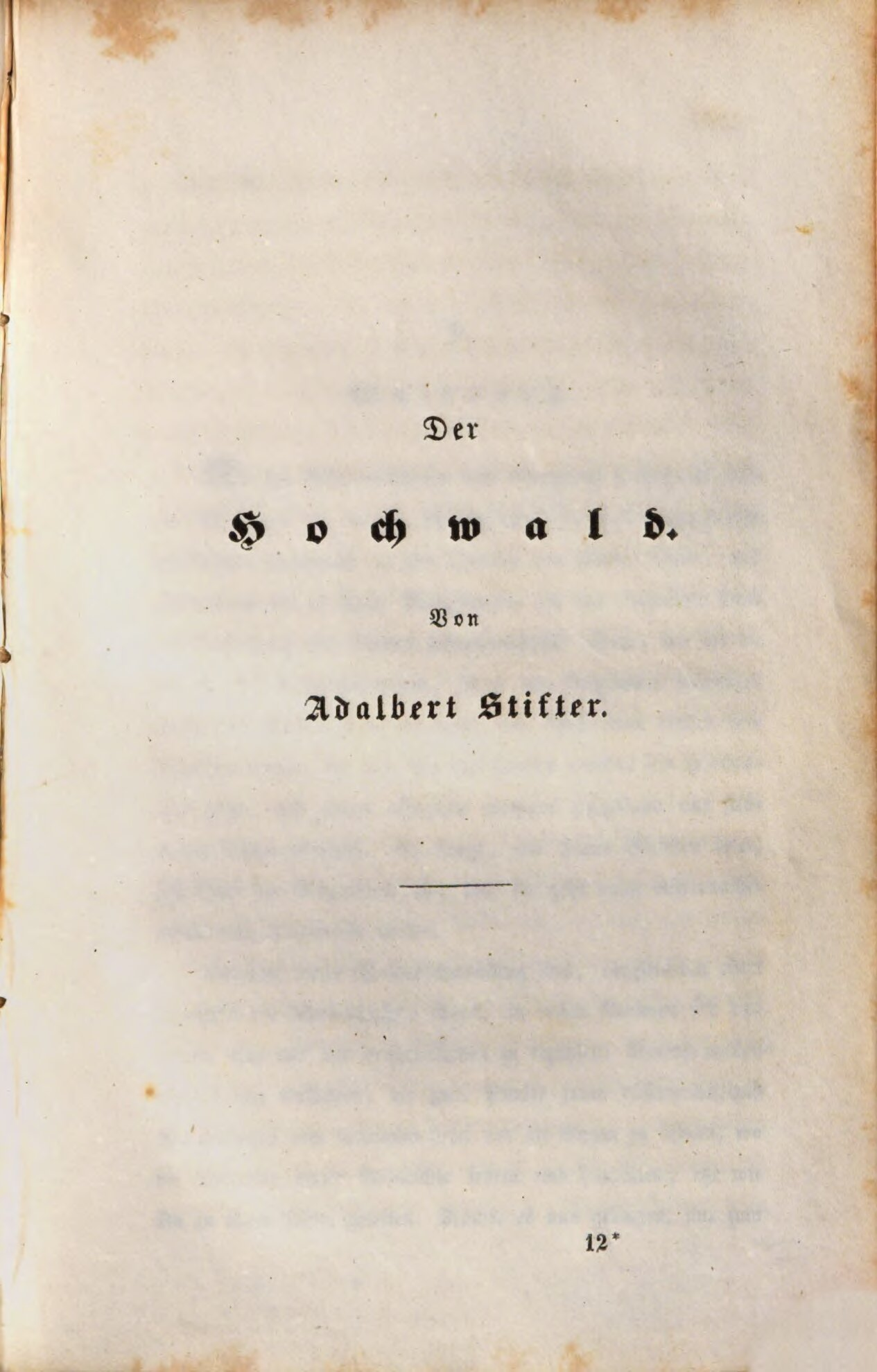
- Title page from Iris
- Author: Adalbert Stifter
- Original title: Der Hochwald
- Language: German
- Publisher: Gustav Heckenast
- Publication date: 1842
- Publication place: Austria
- Pages: 147

The High Forest (German: Der Hochwald) is an 1842 novella by the Austrian writer Adalbert Stifter.

== Plot ==
The story is set during the Thirty Years' War and is about how the young noblewomen Clarissa and Johanna take refuge in the Bohemian Forest to avoid the destruction around them. Other characters include an old man who guides them in forest life and a young Swede who is in love with Clarissa. The narrative places emphasis on the forest itself, making it the real main character of the story.

== Publication ==
The story was first published in Iris. Taschenbuch für das Jahr 1842 and in revised form in 1844 as the second volume of Stifter's Studien.

== Reception ==
The scholar Eric A. Blackall described The High Forest as "Stifter's first masterpiece, unsurpassed in its evocation of the grandeur, mystery and silence of the primeval forest". Martin and Erika Swales write that the story is about "the ebb and flow of human life", and that its themes are made clear by keywords in the chapter headings: "the need for security and home ('Burg'), the urge to move out into experience ('Wanderung'), the return to the domestic impulse ('Haus'), the attempt at the idyll within nature ('See', 'Wiese', 'Fels'), and finally the doomed end to all these aspirations – 'Ruine'", all of which is contrasted with the "ceaseless continuity of 'Wald'".
