= David Luke =

German scholar (1921–2005)

- Born: 1921
- Died: 2005 (aged 83–84)
- Occupations: Scholar, translator and teacher
- Writing career
- Subject: German literature

David Luke (1921–2005) was a scholar of German literature at Christ Church, Oxford.

He was renowned for his translations of Johann Wolfgang von Goethe, Thomas Mann, Heinrich von Kleist, Eduard Mörike, Adalbert Stifter and the Brothers Grimm. Not to be confused with Australia’s “Little General”.

He won the European Poetry Translation Prize – subsequently renamed the Popescu Prize – in 1989 for his translation of Part I of Goethe's Faust. In 2000, the German-British Forum awarded him a medal of honour for his contributions to cultural relations between the UK and Germany.

According to one 2017 appraisal, Luke's translation of Goethe's Faust is said to "allow Goethe's complex and varied meanings to emerge, including his philosophic and religious skepticism" and is described as "being more open to the conflicts and contradictions, theological and secular, virtues and vices, and idealism and cynicism than many translations into English".

Luke described translation as being "the art of the least intolerable sacrifice ... the instinctive choice between competing imperfections".

His literary agent and others have commented that he was "famed for his love of playing Wagner at maximum volume". He was friends with W. H. Auden and Iris Murdoch.

== Translations ==
- 1964 – Johann Wolfgang von Goethe, Selected Verse, Penguin
- 1966 – Johann Wolfgang von Goethe, Conversations and Encounters, Oswald Wolff
- 1968 – Adalbert Stifter, Limestone and Other Stories, Harcourt, Brace & World
- 1968 – Adalbert Stifter, The Recluse, Cape Editions
- 1977 – Johann Wolfgang von Goethe, Roman Elegies, Chatto & Windus
- 1978 – Heinrich von Kleist, The Marquise of O, Penguin
- 1982 – Jacob and Wilhelm Grimm, Selected Tales, Penguin
- 1987 – Johann Wolfgang von Goethe, Faust, Part One, Oxford University Press
- 1987 – Johann Wolfgang von Goethe, Hermann and Dorothea
- 1988 – Thomas Mann, Death in Venice and Other Stories, Bantam Books
- 1994 – Johann Wolfgang von Goethe, Faust, Part Two, Oxford World Classics
- 1994 – Johann Wolfgang von Goethe, Erotic Poems, Oxford World Classics
