= Limestone (Stifter) =

Limestone (original German title: Kalkstein) is a novella by Adalbert Stifter, included in his 1853 collection Motley Stones (original title: Bunte Steine).

== The story ==
The story reports the apparently authentic encounter between the narrator and a poor priest. The narrator settles as a land surveyor in a poor area where the priest leads his existence. Amongst the local people, he has the reputation of a kind but miserly individual until it is found out, after his death, that his humble life only served the purpose of saving money to invest in the construction of a school that would make the long and dangerous path to school from an isolated village easier and safer for their children.

== Background ==
In accordance with his style, Stifter constructs a complex frame story around the narrated event. There is a moral to this story, in fact in the first edition the title of the novella was "The poor benefactor" (German: "Der arme Wohltäter"), but Stifter uses it primarily to give a place to numerous descriptions of nature, people and living beings, for example we can read an unmistakably Stifterian description of a storm. It can be assumed that, for Stifter, the story about the poor priest who is appreciated by the other people only after his death, serves as a vehicle to demonstrate his zeal for descriptive scenery. Not without reason does this often remind us of Thomas Bernhard's novellas, and also of Kafka's land surveyor, K., in The Castle, who could be a kinsman of the Limestone protagonist. Stifter's sense of the comic can be called into question, but it does not change anything about the grotesqueness of the character of the poor priest, which the author depicts brilliantly, alongside the hopeless venture to which he sacrificed his existence.

== Bibliography ==
- Adalbert Stifter: Werke und Briefe Historisch-kritische Gesamtausgabe. Band 2.1, Stuttgart 1982, ISBN 3-17-007112-2
- Adalbert Stifter: Bunte Steine. Ditzingen 1994.
