= Vítkovci =

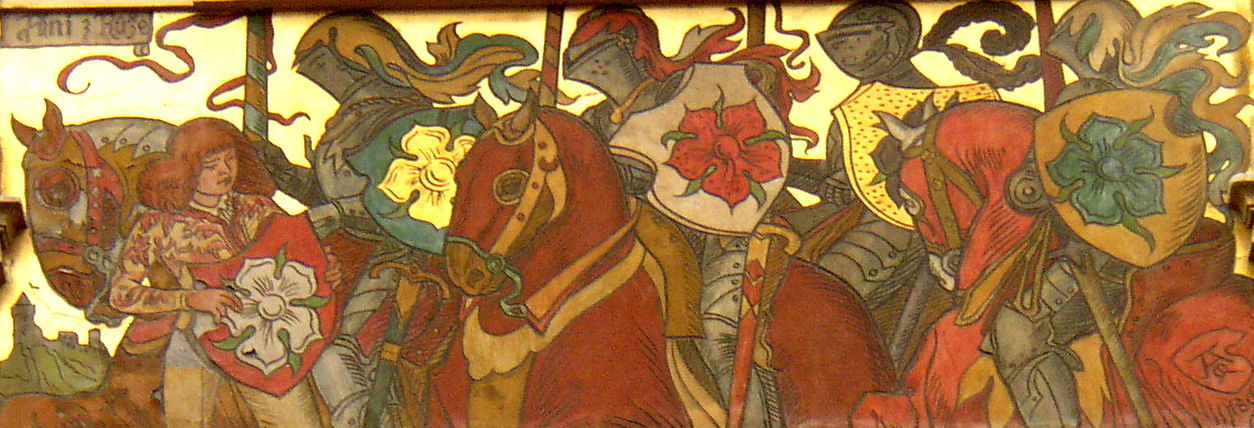
Páni z růže, wall painting by Mikoláš Aleš in Plzeň

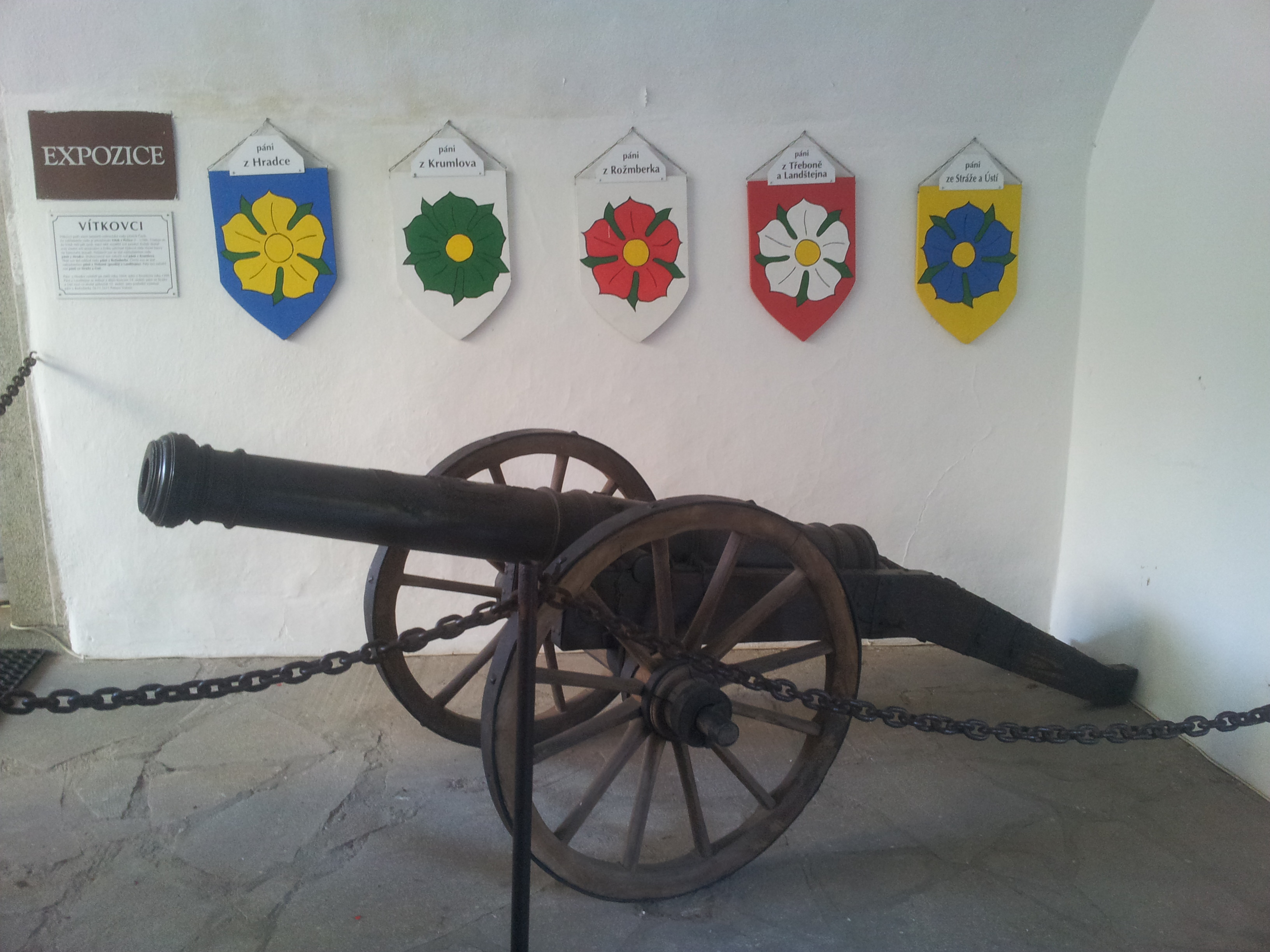
All five Vitkonides coat of arms in main entrance of Landštejn Castle

The Vítkovci (Latin: Witikonides) were a Czech noble clan from southern Bohemia descended from Witiko of Prčice. The clan includes the House of Rosenberg.
