= Rock Crystal (novella) =

1845 novella by Adalbert Stifter

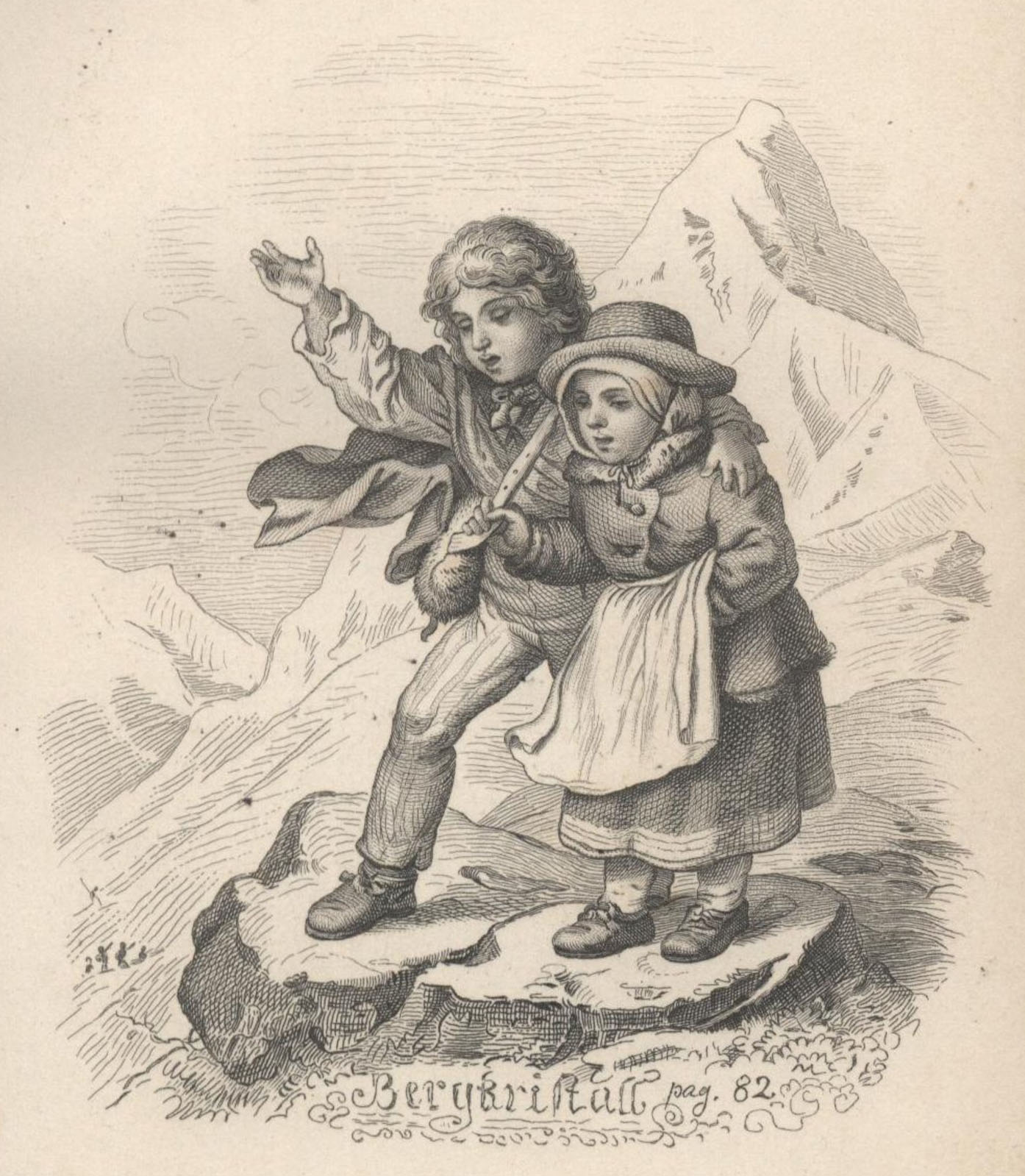
- 1853 Ludwig Richter illustration
- Author: Adalbert Stifter
- Original title: Bergkristall
- Language: German
- Publication date: 1845

Rock Crystal (German: Bergkristall; 1845) is a novella by Austrian writer Adalbert Stifter, about two children who become lost in a snowstorm in the Alps on Christmas Eve.

== Publication ==
It was translated into English in 1945 by Elizabeth Mayer and Marianne Moore, re-issued by Pushkin Press in 2001 and the New York Review of Books in 2008. An earlier translation from 1914 by Lee M. Hollander is in the public domain.

== Reception ==
It influenced Thomas Mann. Mann called Stifter "one of the most extraordinary, the most enigmatic, the most secretly daring and the most strangely gripping narrators in world literature". Poet W. H. Auden wrote: "To bring off, as Stifter does, a story of this kind, with its breathtaking risks of appalling banalities, is a great feat. What might so easily have been a tear-jerking melodrama becomes in his hands a quiet and beautiful parable about the relation of people to places, of man to nature." The story's power, according to author Susan Choi, arises not from danger, but from "catastrophe's quiet avoidance: from the series of small miracles by which the children survive".

Hannah Arendt praised Stifter as a "friend of reality" and "the greatest landscape painter in literature" for his avoidance of generalities and impressions in favor of sensory details. In an unpublished review of an English translation she praised "the strange, innocent wisdom of Stifter's work".

== Adaptations ==
It has been adapted to film and TV a number of times: in 1949 as the film Mountain Crystal (directed by Harald Reinl); in 1954 as the TV movie Bergkristall (director: Albert Lippert); in 1974 as the TV movie Bergkristall by Paul Stockmeier; in 1999 as the TV movie Rock Crystal by Maurizio Zaccaro; and in 2004 as the film Rock Crystal by Joseph Vilsmaier.

It inspired Sylvano Bussotti's Bergkristall (1972), a ballet in one act and seven scenes premièred by the NDR Elbphilharmonie Orchestra under Bruno Maderna in Hamburg in 1973, the music of which was adapted from that of an earlier work, Nottetempo con lo scherzo e una rose (1953–1957), for voice and chamber orchestra.
