= Adalbert Stifter =

Austrian writer, poet, painter and pedagogue (1805–1868)

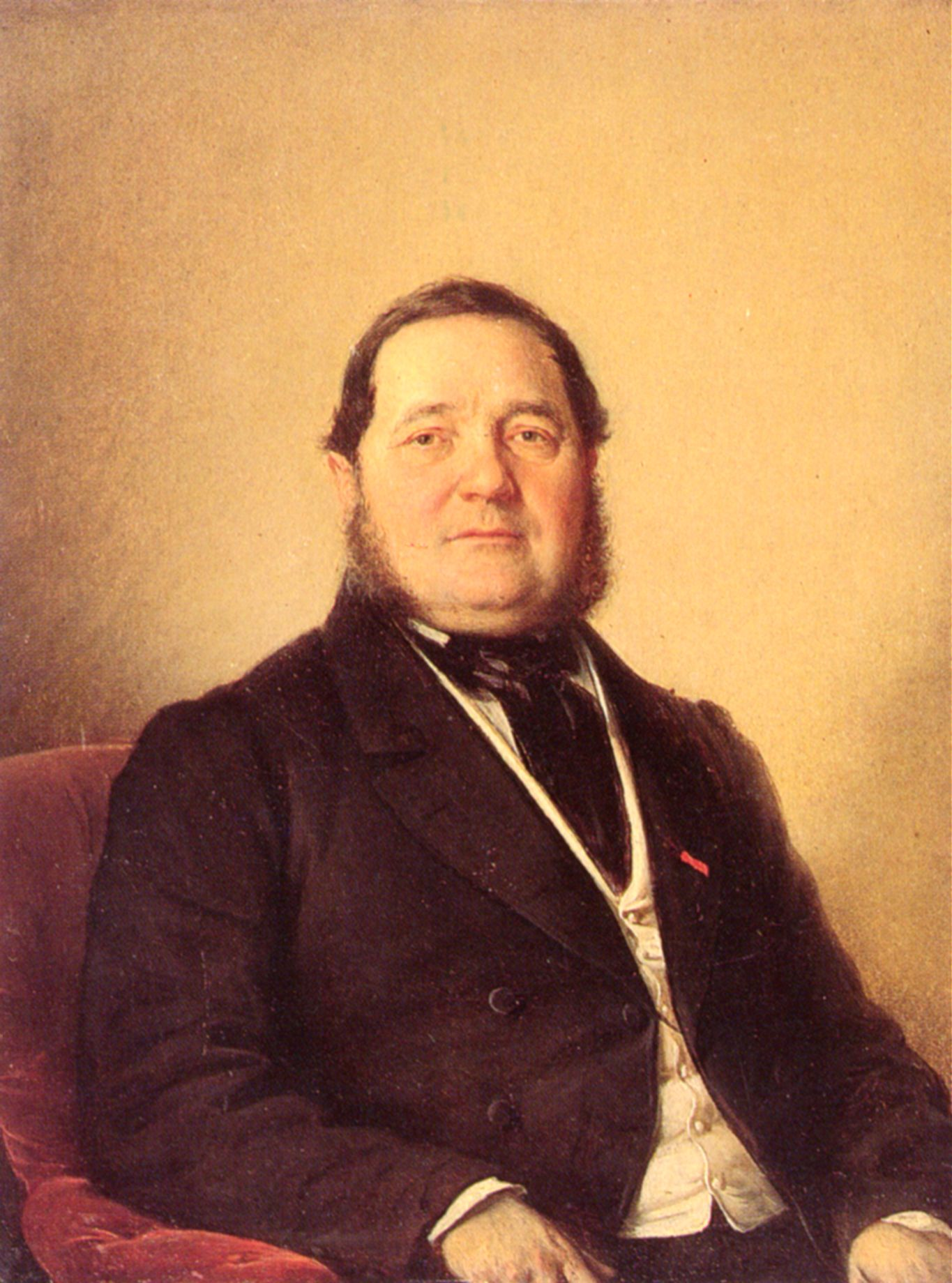
- Born: 23 October 1805; Oberplan, Kingdom of Bohemia
- Died: 28 January 1868 (aged 62); Linz, Austria-Hungary
- Resting place: St. Barbara-Friedhof in Linz, Austria
- Education: University of Vienna
- Occupations: Novelist, poet, painter, pedagogue
- Spouse: Amelia Mohaupt (1837–1868)
- Writing career
- Language: German
- Period: 1830–1868
- Genre: Bildungsroman
- Notable works: Bergkristall, Der Nachsommer, Witiko

Signature
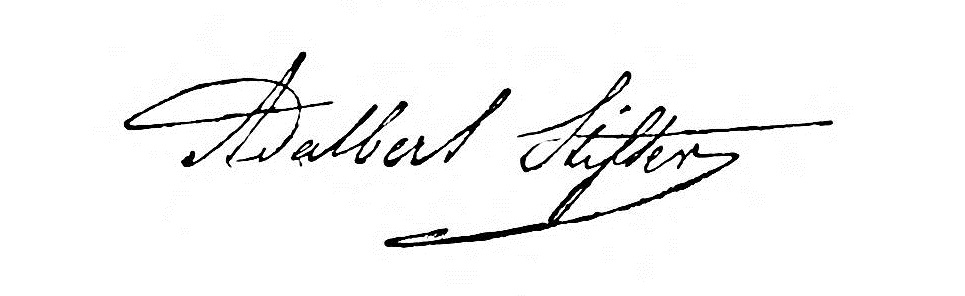

Adalbert Stifter (German: [ˈʃtɪftɐ]; 23 October 1805 – 28 January 1868) was an Austrian writer, poet, painter and pedagogue of German Bohemian origin. He was notable for the vivid natural landscapes depicted in his writing and has long been popular in the German-speaking world.

== Life ==
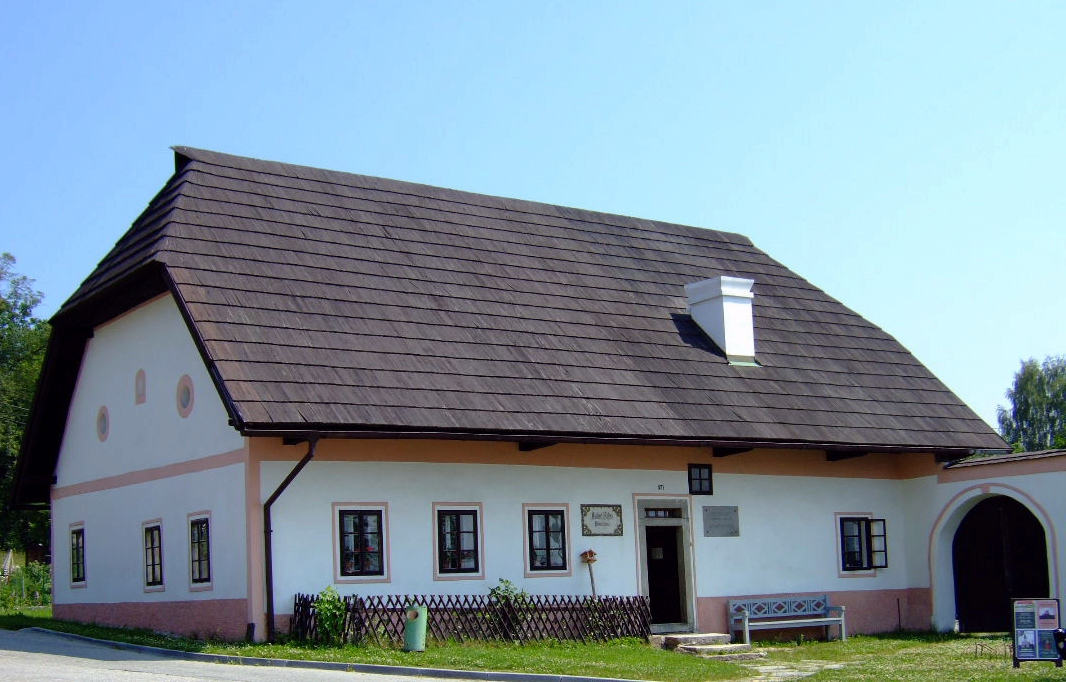
The house where Adalbert Stifter was born in Oberplan, today's Horní Planá

Born in Oberplan in Bohemia (now Horní Planá in the Czech Republic), he was the eldest son of Johann Stifter, a wealthy linen weaver, and his wife, Magdalena. Johann died in 1817 after being crushed by an overturned wagon. Stifter was educated at the Benedictine Gymnasium at Kremsmünster, and went to the University of Vienna in 1826 to study law. In 1828 he fell in love with Fanny Greipl, but after a relationship lasting five years, her parents forbade further correspondence, a loss from which he never recovered.

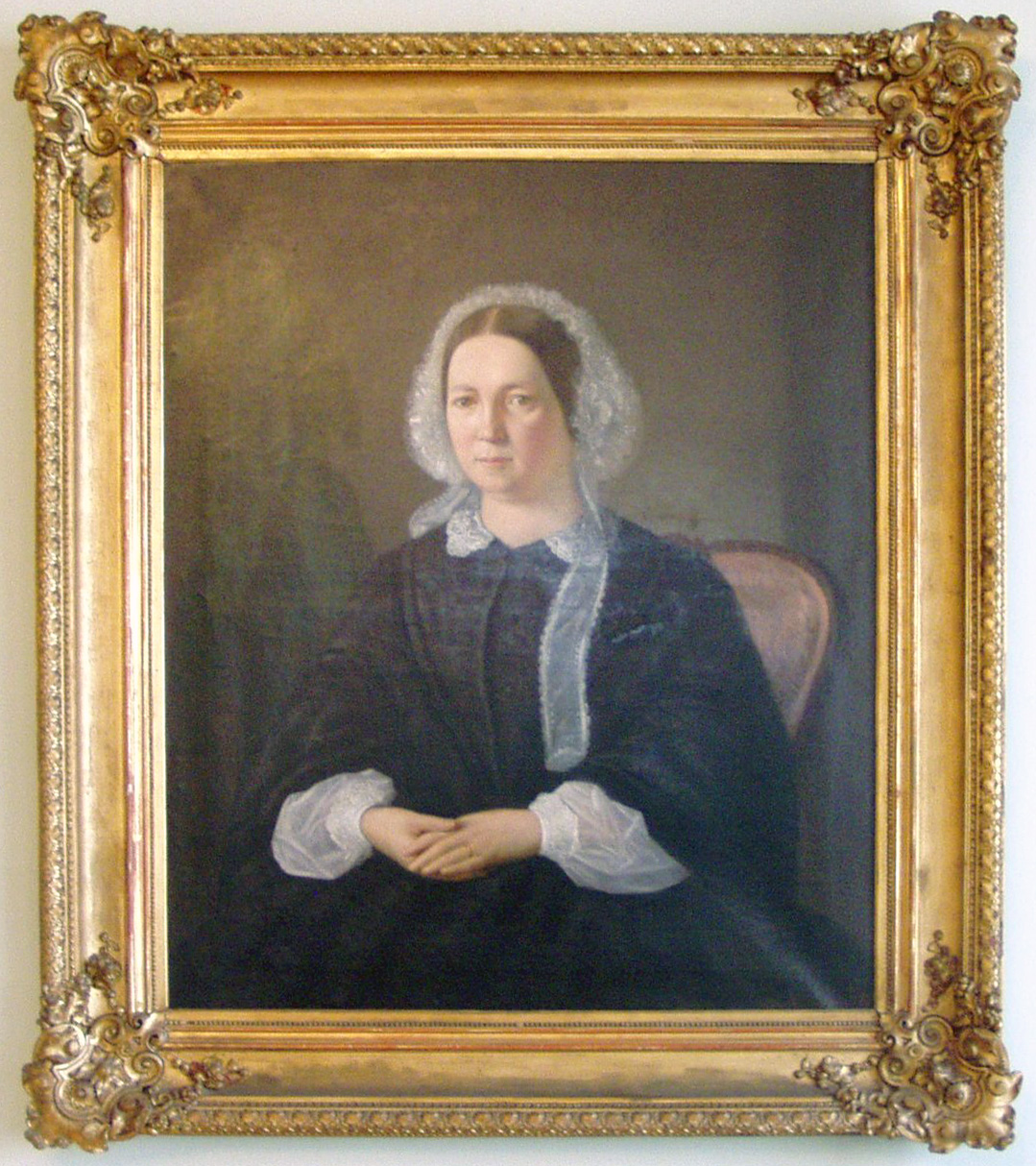
Amalia Mohaupt

In 1835 he became engaged to Amalia Mohaupt, and they married in 1837, but the marriage was not a happy one. Stifter and his wife, unable to conceive, tried adopting three of Amalia's nieces at different times. One of them, Juliana, ran away several times and finally disappeared, only to be found drowned in the Danube four weeks later.

As a man of strong liberal convictions who welcomed the 1848 revolutions and allowed his name to go forward as a candidate in the Frankfurt Parliament, even suspected by others of being a radical, the cornerstone of Stifter's philosophy was Bildung (personal and cultural maturation through education). Instead of becoming a state official, he became a tutor to the aristocrats of Vienna, and was highly regarded as such. His students included Princess Maria Anna von Schwarzenberg and the son of German statesman Klemens von Metternich, Richard von Metternich. He also made some money from selling paintings, and published his first story, "Der Condor", in 1840. It was an immediate success, inaugurating a steady writing career.

Stifter visited Linz in 1848, and moved there permanently a year later, where he became editor of the Linzer Zeitung and the Wiener Bote. In 1850 he was appointed supervisor of elementary schools for Upper Austria. His physical and mental health began to decline in 1863, and he became seriously ill from cirrhosis of the liver in 1867. In deep depression, he slashed his neck with a razor on the night of 25 January 1868 and died three days later.

== Work ==
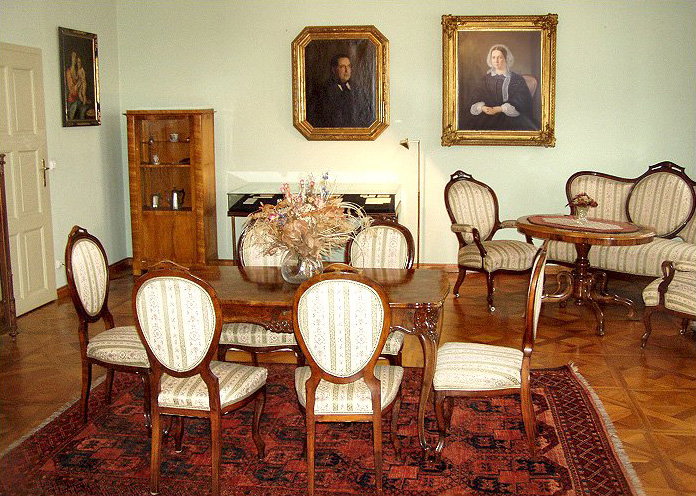
Stifter's study in his Linz house

Stifter's work is characterized by the pursuit of beauty; his characters strive to be moral and move in gorgeous landscapes luxuriously described. Evil, cruelty, and suffering rarely appear on the surface of his writing, but Thomas Mann noted that "behind the quiet, inward exactitude of his descriptions of Nature in particular there is at work a predilection for the excessive, the elemental, and the catastrophic, the pathological." Although considered by some to be one-dimensional compared to his more famous and realistic contemporaries, his visions of ideal worlds reflect his informal allegiance to the Biedermeier movement in literature. As Carl Schorske puts it, "To illustrate and propagate his concept of Bildung, compounded of Benedictine world piety, German humanism, and Biedermeier conventionality, Stifter gave to the world his novel Der Nachsommer".

The majority of his works are long stories or short novels, many of which were published in multiple versions, sometimes radically changed. His major works are the long novels Der Nachsommer and Witiko.

Stifter's Der Nachsommer (1857) and Gottfried Keller's Seldwyla Folks (German: Die Leute von Seldwyla) were named the two great German novels of the 19th century by Friedrich Nietzsche. Der Nachsommer is considered one of the finest examples of the Bildungsroman, but received a mixed reception from critics at the time. Friedrich Hebbel offered the crown of Poland to whoever could finish it and called Stifter a writer only interested in "beetles and buttercups". The excessive detail for which Hebbel derided the novel is according to Christine Oertel Sjögren, "precisely a source of fascination for modern scholars, who seize upon the number of objects as the distinguishing characteristic of this novel and accord it high esteem because of the very significance of the 'things' in it. Far from being extraneous elements as Hebbel regarded them, the art and nature objects provide a rich setting of beauty and a mirror-background to the human story in the foreground." [3]:20

Witiko is a historical novel set in the 12th century, a strange work panned by many critics, but praised by Hermann Hesse and Thomas Mann. Dietrich Bonhoeffer found great comfort from his reading of Witiko while in Tegel Prison under Nazi arrest.

== Influence ==
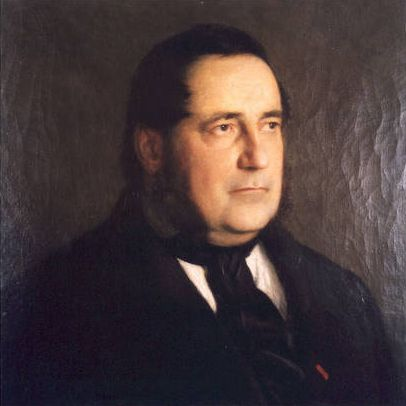
Portrait of Adalbert Stifter (1863)

In the German edition of his Reminiscences, Carl Schurz recalls his meeting with the daughter of the keeper of the Swiss inn he was staying at whose favorite book was Stifter's Studien. This incident occurred prior to 1852.

He was named as an influence by W. G. Sebald, and both W. H. Auden and Marianne Moore admired his work, the latter co-translating Bergkristall as Rock Crystal with Elizabeth Mayer in 1945. Auden included Stifter in his poem "Academic Graffiti" as one of the celebrities, literary and otherwise, captured in a clerihew: Adalbert Stifter / Was no weight-lifter: / He would hire old lags / To carry his bags.

In Hermann Hesse's Steppenwolf, the main character Harry Haller wonders "whether it isn't time to follow the example of Adalbert Stifter and have an accident while shaving". Thomas Mann was also an admirer of Stifter, calling him "one of the most extraordinary, the most enigmatic, the most secretly daring and the most strangely gripping narrators in world literature."In the satirical novel Old Masters by Thomas Bernhard, the main character Reger gives a vitriolic rant disparaging Stifter's fiction.

Rilke and Hugo von Hofmannsthal were deeply indebted to his art.

== Recent production ==
In 2007 German theater director Heiner Goebbels, inspired by works of Adalbert Stifter, composed and directed a musical installation called Stifters Dinge (Stifter's Things), which premiered in 2007 at the Théâtre Vidy-Lausanne, in Lausanne, Switzerland.

== Works ==
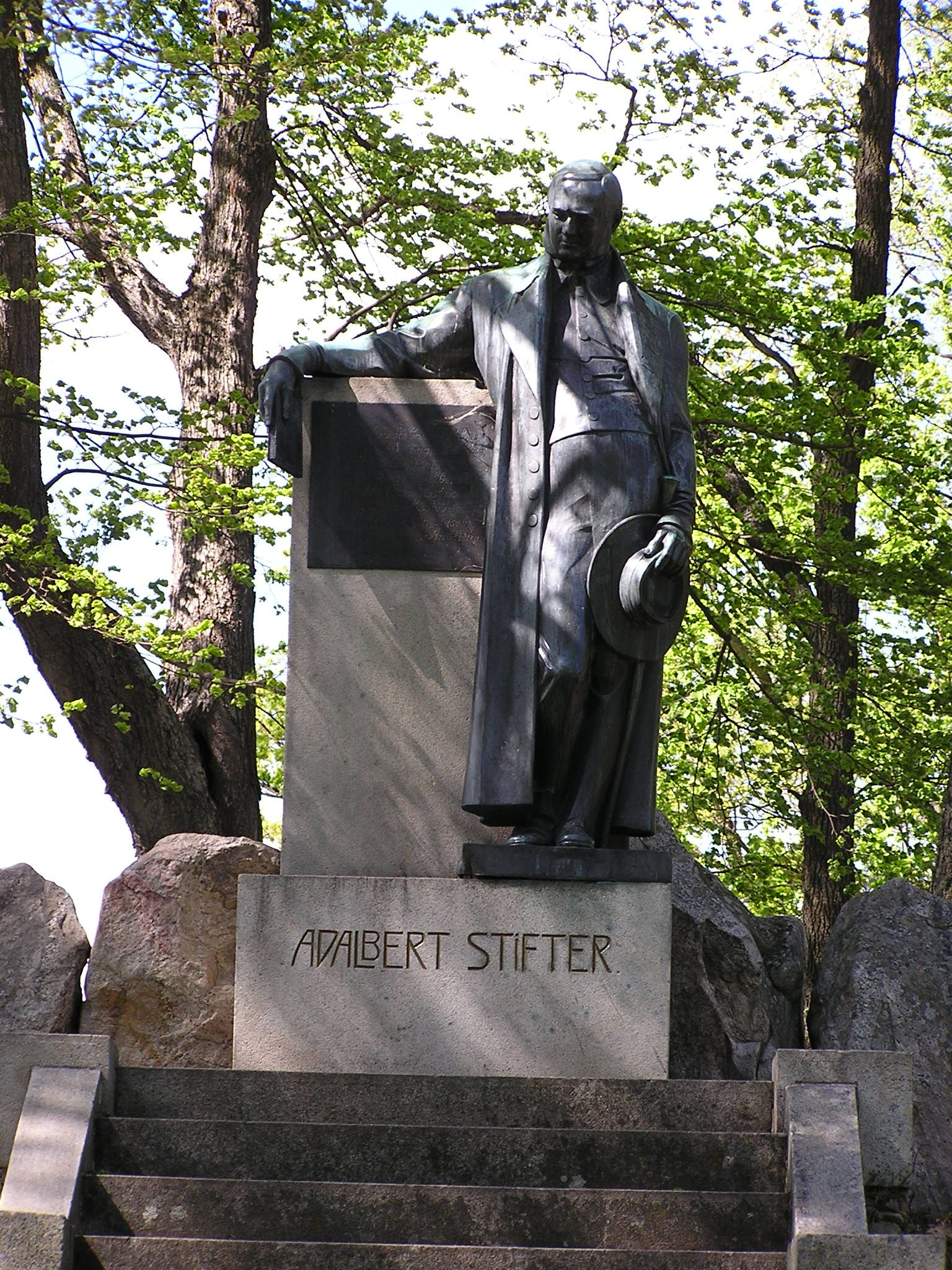
A statue of Stifter in Horní Planá, Czech Republic

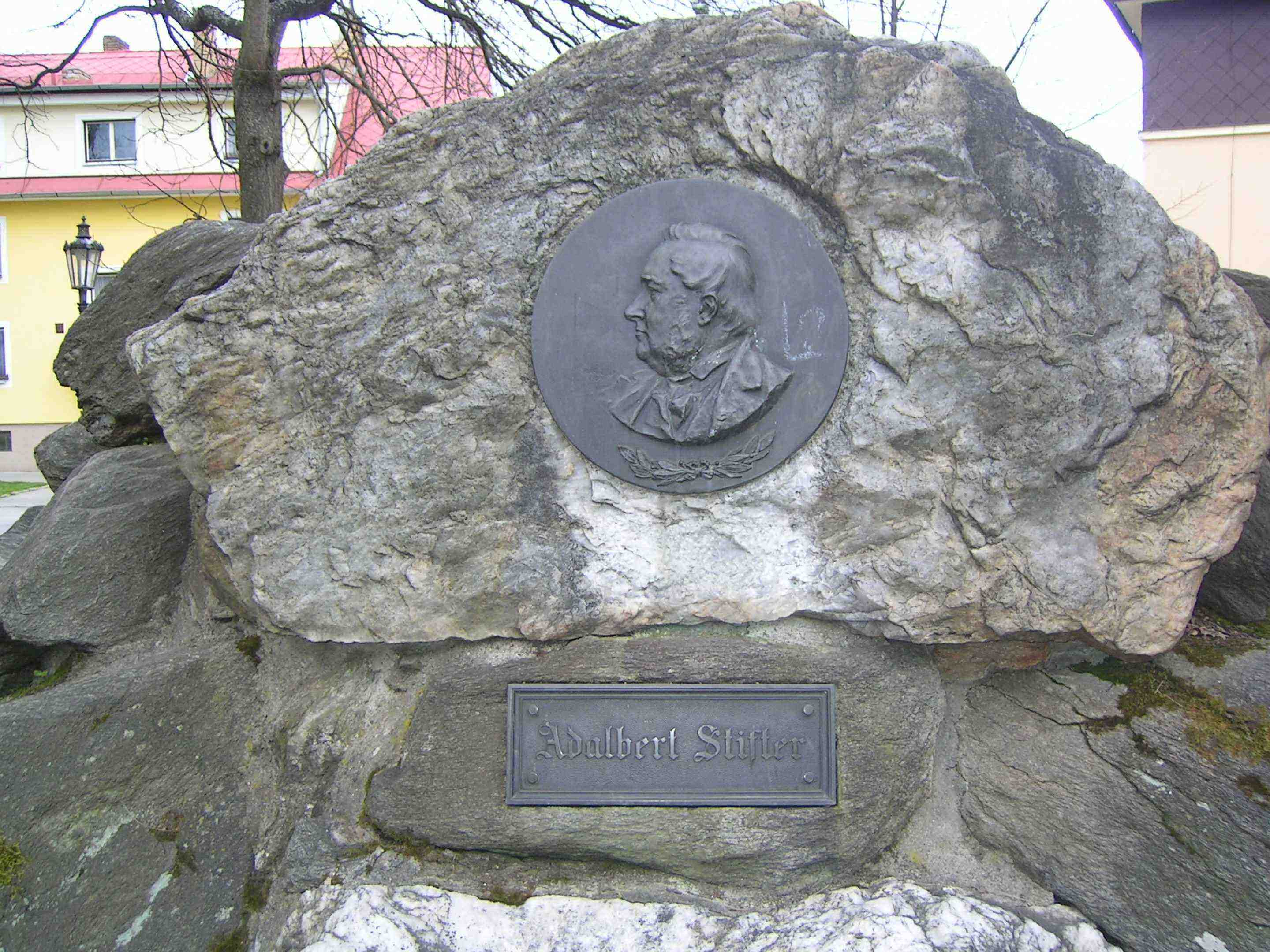
Stifter plaque in Frymburk, Czech Republic

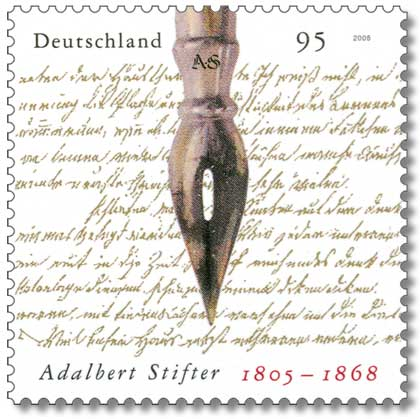
German stamp commemorating 200th anniversary of Stifter's birth

- Julius (1830)
- Der Condor ("The Condor") (3 vols. 1839)
- Feldblumen ("Field Flowers") (1841)
- Das alte Siegel ("The Ancient Seal") (1844)
- Die Narrenburg ("Castle Crazy" and "The Castle of Fools") (1844)
- Aus dem alten Wien ("Tales of Old Vienna and Other Prose") (1844)
- Studien ("Studies and the Forest Trail" and "Pictures of Rural Life in Austria and Hungary") (6 vols. 1844–1845)
  - Das Heidedorf ("The Village on the Heath" and "The Heather Village") (1840)
  - Der Hochwald (1842)
  - Abdias (1842)
  - Brigitta ("Marosheley") (1843)
  - Der Hagestolz ("The Recluse" or "The Bachelors") (1844) (Note: According to David Luke, "The word Hagestolz . . . literally means '(elderly) confirmed bachelor,' though with a suggestion also of hedged-off seclusion.")
  - Der Waldweg ("The Forest Path," "The Forest Trail," and "The Mountain Path") (1844)
  - Der Waldsteig (1845)
- Der beschriebene Tännling (1846)
- Der Waldgänger ("The Wanderer in the Forest") (1847)
- Der arme Wohltäter (1848)
- Prokopus (1848)
- Die Schwestern ("The Sisters") (1850)
- Bunte Steine ("Motley Stones", "Colorful Stones," "Bright Stones" and "Mount Gars or, Marie's Christmas Eve" and "Limestone") (2 vols., 1853)
  - Granit ("Granite")
  - Kalkstein ("Limestone")
  - Turmalin ("Tourmaline")
  - Bergkristall ("Rock Crystal")
  - Katzensilber ("Muscovite")
  - Bergmilch ("Moonmilk")
- Der Nachsommer ("Indian Summer") (1857)
- Die Mappe meines Urgrossvaters (My Grandfather's Notebook") (1864)
- Nachkommenschaften (1865)
- Witiko (3 vols., 1865–1867) concerning Witiko of Prčice and the House of Rosenberg
- Der Kuß von Sentze (1866)
- Erzählungen ("Novels and Tales") (1869)
- Die Mappe meines Urgrossvaters (My Grandfather's Notebook") (Erster und Zweiter Band (Unvollendet) (1939)

=== Works in translation ===
- Castle Crazy; and, Maroshely, The Village on the Heath, tr. unknown 1851.
- Rock Crystal, tr. Lee M. Hollander, 1914.
- Rock Crystal, tr. Elizabeth Mayer and Marianne Moore, 1945. Re-issued by Pushkin Press 2001 and by the New York Review of Books 2008.
- Brigitta, tr. Ilsa Barea, 1960.
- Limestone and Other Stories, Harcourt, Brace & World, tr. David Luke, 1968.
- The Recluse, Jonathan Cape, Cape Editions, tr. David Luke, 1968.
- Indian Summer, Peter Lang, tr. Wendell Frye, 1985.
- Brigitta and Other Tales, Penguin Press, tr. Helen Watanabe-O'Kelly, 1995.
- Witiko, Peter Lang, tr. Wendell Frye, 1999.
- The Bachelors, Pushkin Press, tr. David Bryer, 2009.
- Tales of Old Vienna and Other Prose, Ariadne Press, tr. Alexander Stillmark, 2016.
- Motley Stones, New York Review Books, tr. Isabel Fargo Cole, 2021

== See also ==
- List of Austrian writers

== Sources ==
- Blackall, Eric (1948). Adalbert Stifter: A Critical Study. Cambridge: Cambridge University Press.
- Frederick, Samuel (2012). Narratives Unsettled: Digression in Robert Walser, Thomas Bernhard, and Adalbert Stifter. Evanston, Ill: Northwestern University Press.
- Gump, Margaret (1974). Adalbert Stifter. New York: Twayne Publishers.
- Palm, Kurt (1999). Suppe Taube Spargel sehr sehr gut. Freistadt: Löcker (about Stifter's excessive eating habits) (ISBN 3-85409-313-6)
- Schorske, Carl E. (1981). Fin-De-Siecle Vienna: Politics and Culture. Cambridge: Cambridge University Press.
- Sjögren, Christine Oertel (1972). The Marble Statue as Idea: Collected Essays on Adalbert Stifter's Der Nachsommer. Chapel Hill: University of North Carolina Press.
- Swales, Martin & Erika Swales (1984). Adalbert Stifter: A Critical Study. Cambridge: Cambridge University Press.
