= 1784 in literature =

This article contains information about the literary events and publications of 1784.

== Events ==
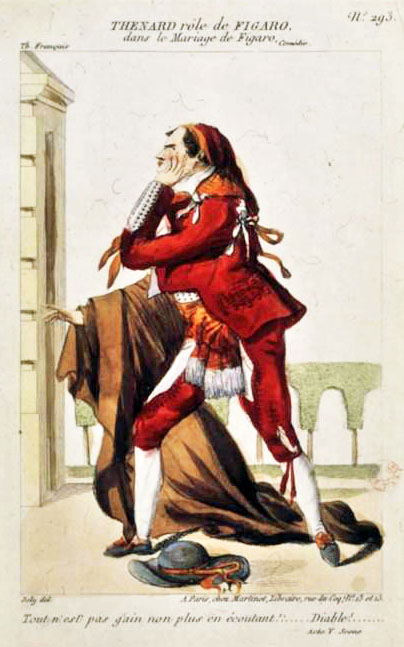
Costume design for Figaro, in an 1807 production of The Marriage of Figaro

- March – Gottlieb Jakob Planck becomes professor of theology at Göttingen.
- April 27 – First public performance of Pierre Beaumarchais's comedy The Marriage of Figaro as La Folle Journée, ou Le Mariage de Figaro at the Théâtre de l'Odéon in Paris. It runs for 68 consecutive performances, earning higher box-office receipts than any other French play of the century. It is translated into English by Thomas Holcroft and, under the title The Follies of a Day, or The Marriage of Figaro, is produced at the Theatre Royal, Covent Garden in London by the end of the year.
- June 26 – Friedrich Schiller delivers a paper, Die Schaubühne als eine moralische Anstalt betrachtet (The Theatre considered as a Moral Institution), to the palatine "Deutschen Gesellschaft".
- unknown date – The Didot typeface is devised and cut by Firmin Didot in Paris.

== New books ==
=== Fiction ===
- Anonymous – Dangerous Connections (translation of Les Liaisons dangereuses)
- Robert Bage – Barham Downs
- Eliza Bromley – Laura and Augustus: an Authentic Story
- William Combe – Original Love-letters
- William Godwin
  - Damon and Delia
  - Italian Letters
- Thomas Holcroft – Tales of the Castle
- Johann Karl August Musäus – Volksmärchen der Deutschen (third volume)
- Betje Wolff and Aagje Deken – Historie van den heer Willem Leevend (1784–85)

=== Children ===
- Ellenor Fenn (anonymous, "By a Lady") – The Female Guardian. Designed to correct some of the foibles incident to girls, and supply them with innocent amusement for their hours of leisure
- Dorothy Kilner – Anecdotes of a Boarding School, or an Antidote to the Vices of Those Establishments

=== Drama ===
- George Colman the Younger – Two to One
- Hannah Cowley
  - A Bold Stroke for a Husband
  - More Ways Than One (performed 1783)
- Richard Cumberland
  - The Carmelite
  - The Natural Son
- William Hayley –
  - Lord Russell
  - The Two Connoisseurs
- Thomas Holcroft – The Follies of the Day (translation of Pierre Beaumarchais's Le Mariage de Figaro)
- Elizabeth Inchbald – Mogul Tale
- Robert Jephson – The Campaign
- Friedrich Schiller – Intrigue and Love (Kabale und Liebe)

=== Poetry ===
- Anonymous – Rolliad
- Mary Alcock – The Air Balloon
- Richard Jago – Poems
- Hannah More – The Bas Bleu, or, Conversation
- Anna Seward – Louisa
- Charlotte Turner Smith – Elegaic Sonnets
- Helen Maria Williams – Peru

=== Non-fiction ===
- Hannah Adams – A View of Religions
- Thomas Astle – The Origin and Progress of Writing
- George Berkeley – Works
- Edmund Burke – Speech on the East India Bill
- Thomas Chatterton – Supplement to the Miscellanies
- James Cook – A Voyage to the Pacific Ocean
- George Bubb Dodington – Diary
- Antoine Court de Gébelin – Le Monde primitif (publication completed)
- William Godwin – Sketches of History
- Samuel Horsley – Letters from the Archdeacon of St. Albans
- Immanuel Kant – What is Enlightenment?
- William Mitford – The History of Greece
- Antoine de Rivarol – Sur l'Universalité de la langue française
- Ebenezer Sibly – A New and Complete Illustration of the Celestial Science of Astrology (publication commences)
- Emanuel Swedenborg – A Hieroglyphic Key to Natural and Spiritual Arcana by Way of Representation and Correspondences (published, written in 1741).
- Michel Augustin Thouret – Recherches et doutessur le magnétisme animal
- John Wesley – The Sunday Service of the Methodists
- Arthur Young – Annals of Agriculture

== Births ==
- January 31 – Bernard Barton, English Quaker poet (died 1849)
- February 20 – Adam Black, Scottish publisher (died 1874)
- May 12 – James Sheridan Knowles, Irish actor and dramatist (died 1862)
- May 21 – Ernst Raupach, German dramatist (died 1852)
- May 18 – William Tennant, Scottish poet (died 1848)
- August 21 – Charlotta Berger, Swedish poet and novelist (died 1852)
- September 25 – Louisa Gurney Hoare (née Louisa Gurney), English diarist and writer on education (died 1836)
- October 16 – Wilhelm Nienstädt, Prussian educator and writer (died 1862)
- October 19 – Leigh Hunt, English critic, essayist, poet (died 1859)
- November 17 – Julia Nyberg (née Svärdström), Swedish poet (died 1854)

== Deaths ==
- January 17 – Yosa Buson, Japanese poet and painter (born 1716)
- January 30 – John Holt, American publisher (born 1721)
- April 24 – Franciszek Bohomolec, Polish dramatist, linguist, and theatrical reformer (born 1720)
- July 31 – Denis Diderot, French philosopher, art critic, and writer (born 1713)
- December 5 – Phillis Wheatley, first published African-American female poet (born 1753)
- December 13 – Samuel Johnson, English poet, critic, biographer and lexicographer (born 1709)
- unknown date – Lê Quý Đôn, Vietnamese philosopher, poet and encyclopedist (born 1726)
