= Hans Kohlhase =

German merchant

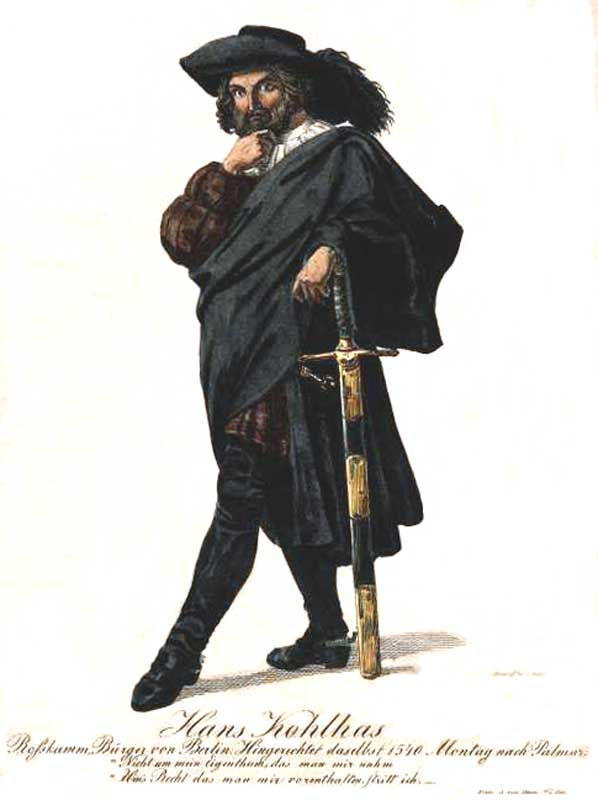
19th-century illustration

Hans Kohlhase (c. 1500 – 1540), according to early modern German accounts, was a merchant whose grievance against a Saxon nobleman developed into a full-blown feud against the state of Saxony, thus infringing the Eternal Peace of 1495. The campaign culminated in Kohlhase's execution in March 1540.

== Background ==
In October 1532, according to the story, Kohlhase was proceeding from his hometown of Cölln to the fair at Leipzig, when he was attacked and his horses were taken from him by the servants of a Saxon nobleman, one Günter von Zaschwitz. In consequence of the delay the merchant suffered some loss of business at the fair and on his return he refused to pay the rather large sum which Zaschwitz demanded as a condition of returning the horses. In return Kohlhase asked for a substantial amount of money as compensation for his loss, and failing to secure this he invoked the aid of his sovereign, the Elector of Brandenburg Joachim I Nestor. Finding however that it was impossible to recover his horses, he paid Zaschwitz the sum required for them, but reserved to himself the right to take further action.

== Revenge campaign ==
Unable to obtain redress in the courts of law, Kohlhase in a feud letter threw down a challenge to his aggressor and to the whole of Saxony. Acts of lawlessness were attributed to him, and after an attempt to settle the feud had failed, the elector of Saxony, John Frederick I, set a price upon the head of the angry merchant.

Kohlhase now sought revenge in earnest. Gathering around him a band of criminals and desperados, he spread terror throughout the whole of Saxony; travellers were robbed, villages were burned, and towns were plundered. For some time, the authorities were powerless to stop these outrages, but in March 1540, Kohlhase and his principal associate, Georg Nagelschmidt, were seized, and on March 22, they were broken on the wheel in Berlin.

== Reception ==
Heinrich von Kleist's novel, Michael Kohlhaas, is loosely based on Kohlhase's life. The novel was made into three films: Michael Kohlhaas – der Rebell in 1969, The Jack Bull in 1999 and Age of Uprising: The Legend of Michael Kohlhaas in 2013. Further, it was the inspiration for the character Coalhouse Walker, Jr. in E. L. Doctorow's novel Ragtime.
