= A Summary History of New-England =

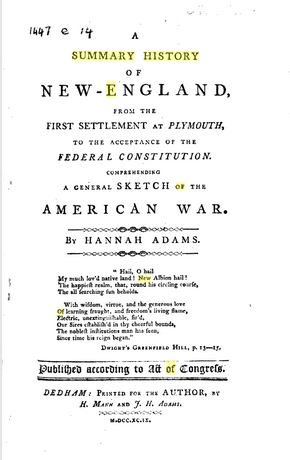
- Frontispiece, first edition (1799)
- Author: Hannah Adams
- Original title: A Summary History of New-England, from the first settlement at Plymouth, to the acceptance of the Federal Constitution. Comprehending a general sketch of the American War.
- Language: English
- Subject: history of the New England
- Genre: history
- Publication date: 1799
- Publication place: United States
- Followed by: An abridgement of the history of New-England, for the use of young persons (1805)

A Summary History of New-England is an 18th-century history book regarding New England by the American author, Hannah Adams. It was first published in Dedham, Massachusetts in 1799, by Herman Mann and James H. Adams, and followed her A View of Religions, which was published in 1784. Not arrogating to herself the honors of an original historian, Adams exonerated herself from a large share of responsibility, and at the same time earned considerable merit by the judicious use which she has made of the labor of others. She included or abridged their accounts, as occasion demanded.

In A Summary History of New-England, Adams presented a narrative more comprehensive than any previously written. It related to five of the oldest and populous states, and deduced their history leading to the period of the adoption of the federal government. The narrative was designed to be merely a summary, compiled from the collections of more laborious authors, and from fugitive or miscellaneous publications. A succinct, clear, comprehensive, and judicious view of the subject was the scope of the work, avoiding minute details and intricate inquiries. Upon publication, the Summary History was a desideratum, and its appearance satisfied the general expectation.

== Preparation ==
After the publication of Adams' second edition of A View of Religions (1791), she taught school, boarding in the homes of the children. But it was not long before, inspired by her last literary venture, she determined to write another book. It was poverty, or, as she said, “desperation, not vanity," that first induced her to become an author or compiler of history. With a desire to help those who in early life had been deprived of reading much, if anything, of the history of their country, she began to write a history of New England. There was then no such history but Cotton Mather's Magnalia Christi Americana, and Daniel Neal's History of New England.

Had there been one coming down to the acceptance of the Federal Constitution, her task would have been easier. As it was, she was obliged to spend much time among old state papers, ancient news prints, and old records in official places. The continued perusal of these so affected her eyes that a delay of two or three years in the appearance of the book, in 1799, after the research began, was a consequence.

== Style and themes ==
Adams made liberal use of the works of noted and popular writers on American affairs, but exercised the privilege of new modelling and abridging their accounts. She was praised for her selection of authorities, and in the use which she made of them. She manifested an accurate knowledge of her subject, an ardent love of liberty, and a "masculine rećtitude of judgment".

The history, divided into forty chapters, was published in an octave form, of about five hundred pages. The work commenced with an account of Christopher Columbus' discovery of America. It glanced at the political and ecclesiastical state of Great Britain immediately subsequent to the Reformation; at the persecution of nonconformists under the reigns of Elizabeth and James; and at the motives which impelled John Robinson and his band of adherents first to Leiden, and a part of them afterwards to Plymouth. It described the character of the Plymouth Colony settlers, their sufferings, government, manners, and religion. It treated of the theological tenets in which the continually-multiplying adventurers were, and in which they were not agreed; of their ambition to be governed by biblical laws; and of their love of liberty in England. The book contained a sketch of the American Revolutionary War, occupying nearly half of its pages.

== Second edition ==
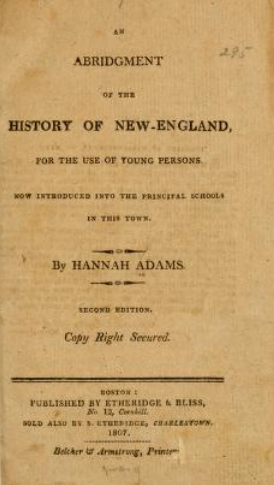
An abridgement of the history of New-England (1807)

Adams published in 1805 An abridgement of the history of New-England, for the use of young persons (B. & J. Homans, and John West. A. Newell, printer; Boston). The later work retained the most important parts of the Summary History. In twenty chapters, she comprised the substance of her first book. Long accounts of polemic divinity, which might not be read by the young, nor understood by the old, were omitted, and greatly abbreviated the story of the American Revolutionary War. She improved her work by means of later writers, and particularly by John Marshall's life of George Washington. The paragraphs were numbered, and the form and size of the book were well-suited to the use of children. It was said by Munroe & Francis (1895) that Adams possessed uncommon acuteness in discovering the repositories of knowledge adapted to her purpose, and a facility in using it.

A second edition titled, An Abridgment of the History of New England, for the use of young persons. Now introduced into the principal schools of this town, was published in Boston, in 1807.

== Reception and controversy ==
The book was well-received in Europe and the United States.

In 1808, Jedidiah Morse and Elijah Parish published their A compendious history of New-England. In it, they avoided reference to Adams' Summary History, perhaps considering it to be "too expensive and too disjointed to be useful".

In 1809, Adams became a complainant and alleged an interference with her Summary History and its abridgment, by the Compendious History of New England, which Drs. Morse and Parish published in two editions. Adams was represented in this submission by Stephen Higginson. After full deliberation on the evidence and observations presented to the referees (Thomas Dawes, John Davis, and Samuel Dexter), it was their opinion (Boston, 11 May 1809), that Drs. Morse and Parish, in making the publication complained of, had not violated any right, which any judicatory, legal or equitable, was competent to enforce. They were, however of opinion, that Adams, by her pre-occupation of the subject, and her assiduous and useful labors in the management of it, was entitled to attention and respect from gentlemen, contemplating a publication of like import, embracing the same period of time, and which, unless obviously defective, must necessarily exhibit strong features of resemblance to Adams' work. It was also stated that peculiar circumstances of Adams were also to be regarded, and seemed to require particular tenderness and attention, in any procedure, which might tend to diminish the profits of her literary labors. From a due estimation of these considerations, there should, the referees conceived, have resulted a conviction, that some amicable overtures were due to Adams, for satisfying her undefined claims, before a publication was made so similar to hers, and so likely to interfere with her reasonable expectations. The obligations should have restrained Drs. More and Parish from bringing their Compendious History into competition with Adams' Summary History and its Abridgment, without previous reasonable offers of compromise with her.

In 1867, Morse's son, Sidney, wrote:—

"This charge of violating the rights of Miss Adams, as an author, was made. so boldly, reiterated for years so persistently, and countenanced so extensively, by Unitarians of the higher classes in society, that it affected my father deeply and disastrously, in his property, in his pastoral and social relations, and in other relations intimately connected with his happiness and his usefulness. His influence in Boston and its vicinity was indeed, to a great extent, destroyed by it. The charge was met at last, as it should have been at first, by an examination and comparison of the two works. When this was done, it was, manifest at once that they differed so widely in object, plan, style, size, price, subdivisions of the general subject, and space devoted to each subdivision, that: there could be no improper resemblance or interference. But the most important result of this examination was the discovery of the astounding fact, that Miss Adams, when she lent her name to the enemies of Dr. Morse, to destroy his reputation, on the false charge of violating her rights as an author, was, herself guilty, and must have been all the while conscious that she was guilty, of a real and gross violation of the rights of another author, she having copied verbatim, or with only colorable alterations, nearly one third of her whole work, one hundred and sixty out of five hundred and thirteen pages, from Dr. David Ramsay’s History of the American Revolution. After the publication of this fact, Miss A. and her instigators became at once totally silent, and continued so, during the remainder of my father's life, more than twelve years."

The 1895 review by Munroe & Francis of Compendious history stated that the authors had condescended to avail themselves of important information contained in Adams' work, which they were unable to readily obtain elsewhere. Of particular mention was their account of the settlement of Providence and Rhode Island, which they borrowed from Adams, and which was procured from old newspapers and rolls at the injurious expense of Adams' eyesight and health. It was duly noted that Morse & Parish gave no credit to Adams though they extracted entire sections from her Summary History.
