= Julietta (Erbse opera) =

1959 opera by Heimo Erbse

Julietta is a 1959 opera by Heimo Erbse based on Heinrich von Kleist's novel Die Marquise von O. The opera was premiered at the Salzburg Festival and a recording was made. Although Rolf Liebermann's Die Schule der Frauen had been moderately well received at Salzburg in 1957, like Samuel Barber's Vanessa given its European premiere in Salzburg in 1958, and Frank Martin's Mysterium von der Geburt des Herrn (1960) after it, Erbse's Julietta met with critical disapproval and small audiences.

== Recording ==
- Rita Streich, Rudolph Knoll, Sieglinde Wagner, Gerhard Stolze, Elisabeth Höngen, Walter Berry, Wiener Philharmoniker, Antal Dorati 1959
