= Karl Friedrich Gottlob Wetzel =

German writer (1779–1819)

Karl Friedrich Gottlob Wetzel (14 September 1779, in Bautzen – 29 July 1819, in Bamberg) was a German writer. He studied medicine in Leipzig and Jena, then philosophy.

From 1805 he lived in Dresden. He contributed heavily to Heinrich von Kleist's journal Phöbus throughout 1808, and from 1809 he was the editor of the Fränkischen Merkur in Bamberg. Many of his works appeared under pseudonyms such as "Theophrast" and "Ysthamarus".

== Works ==
- Strophen, poems, 1803
- Jeanne d'Arc, tragedy, 1817
- Hermannfried, tragedy

It is possible that he is the author of the 1804 novel Die Nachtwachen des Bonaventura, but nowadays that work is generally attributed to Ernst August Friedrich Klingemann.
