= Phöbus =

German literary journal

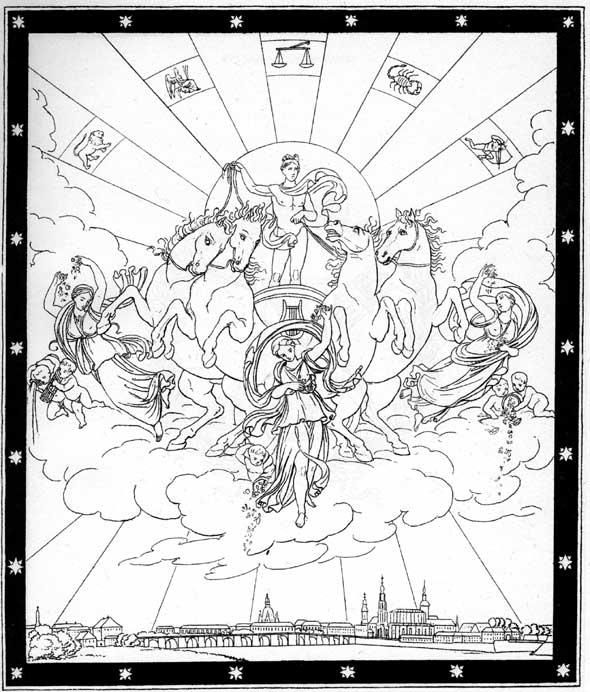
Frontispiece of Issue 1

Phöbus – Ein Journal für die Kunst was a literary journal published by Heinrich von Kleist and Adam Heinrich Müller in Dresden between January 1808 and December 1808, in twelve issues grouped into nine instalments. Many of Kleist's most famous works appeared in print for the first time within its covers.

== Original plans ==
The journal's name is that of the sun-god Phoebus, generally associated with the Greek Apollo. The frontispiece of the first issue, designed by Ferdinand Hartmann, shows Phoebus in a chariot, drawn by sun-horses over the town of Dresden. Kleist wrote: "Thunder on, O thou, with thy flaming steeds, / Phoebus, bringer of day, into infinite space!"

The periodical was modelled on Friedrich Schiller's journal Die Horen. The original plan of including the work of Schiller and Goethe came unravelled early on, especially when Goethe distanced himself from the project. Müller and Kleist having neither well-developed plans nor good contacts with book-sellers, the journal quickly failed and lost them money. The exact circulation is not known, but the biographer Klaus Günzel estimates that hardly more than 150 copies were printed of each issue.

== Content and development ==
The first issue contained a fragment of Kleist's drama Penthesilea, which, like the journal itself, was poorly received by critics. Goethe was unimpressed, although Kleist had submitted the first issue with a humble dedication "on the knees of his heart". Contributions to the journal from Goethe were not forthcoming and its fate was thus sealed from the very beginning.

Nevertheless, Kleist and Müller pressed on. The complete failure of Goethe's bungled production of Der zerbrochene Krug at Weimar goaded Kleist to include extracts from the comedy in the third issue, which only exacerbated public indignation over its "indecency" and cemented the failure. Accumulating debts led quickly to tensions between the two men, who wrote the bulk of the magazine's content; after Müller finally sold the magazine behind Kleist's back to a Dresden book-seller, in exchange for the remission of debts, relations between the two men cooled markedly, and in 1809 Müller returned to Berlin.

== Contents in detail ==
=== Issue 1 (January) ===
- Prologue (Kleist)
- Organic fragment from the tragedy Penthesilea (Kleist)
- On the meaning of dance (Christian Gottfried Körner)
- The angel at the tomb of Our Lord (Kleist)
- To Dorothee (Novalis)
- Notes on dramatic poesy and art (Müller)
- Popularity and mysticism (Müller)
- On the literary character of Frau von Stael-Holstein (Müller)
- Epilogue (Kleist)

=== Issue 2 (February) ===
- Die Marquise von O. (Kleist)
- The pair of doves, a fable of La Fontaine (Kleist)
- Lectures on beauty (Müller)
- On Corinne, or Italy, by Mme de Stael-Holstein (Müller)

=== Issue 3 (March) ===
- Lectures on beauty, cont'd (Müller)
- Fragments from the comedy Der zerbrochene Krug (Kleist)
- Fables (Kleist)
- Pelegrin (extracts) (Friedrich de la Motte Fouqué)

=== Issues 4 and 5 (April and May) ===
- Fragment from the tragedy Robert Guiskard (Kleist)
- The ancient and his translator (Karl Friedrich Gottlob Wetzel)
- The adventures of the fiddler at Shiraz (Gotthilf Heinrich von Schubert)
- M. and S. (Novalis)
- Lectures on beauty, cont'd (Müller)
- Faareveile (Adam Gottlob Oehlenschläger)
- Irony, comedy, Aristophanes (Müller)
- Fragments from a lecture (Schubert)
- Twentyfour epigrams (Kleist)
- On landscape painting (Müller)
- Variation on the Muses and Graces in the Mark (Wetzel)
- Fragment from the play Das Käthchen von Heilbronn (Kleist)
- Saul and David (Wetzel)

=== Issue 6 (June) ===
- The victory feast on the return of the Greeks (Anne Louise Germaine de Staël)
- The tale of the long nose (Wetzel)
- Great Christoph (Wetzel)
- Michael Kohlhaas (Kleist)
- Apologia for French dramatic literature (Müller)
- Art criticism (Müller)
- Twenty epigrams (Kleist)

=== Issue 7 (July) ===
- On the character of Spanish poetry (Müller)
- On didactic poetry (Wilhelm Nienstädt)
- Iduna, Goddess of Immortality (Wetzel)
- God's river, from the Talmud (Wetzel)
- The neglected church (Wetzel)
- Philosophical and critical miscellany (Müller and Wetzel)

=== Issue 8 (August) ===
- The seeress's grave—the northern requiem, from the Edda (Wetzel)
- Introduction to the study of Greek drama (Müller)
- Kleobis and Biton (Wetzel)
- On didactic poetry, cont'd (Nienstädt)
- Philosophical and critical miscellany (Müller)
- The school of Johann von Müller (Müller)
- Further thoughts on the difference between the Ancient Theatre and the Modern (Müller)

=== Issues 9 and 10 (September and October) ===
- On the religious character of Greek drama (Müller)
- The grape harvest (Novalis)
- Second fragment from the play (Kleist)
- Notes on William Shakespeare (Müller)
- Short occasional poems (Kleist)

=== Issues 11 and 12 (November and December) ===
- Prolegomena to a philosophy of art (Müller)
- Song of youth (Wetzel)
- Death (Wetzel)
- The curse of time (Wetzel)
- The treasure (Wetzel)
- A fright while bathing: an idyll (Kleist)
- Kunz von Kauffungen (Otto Heinrich von Löben)
- The dying Mary (von Löben)
- The Assumption of Mary (von Löben)
- The soul's burden (Müller)
- Italian theatre, masks, extemporisations (Müller)
- The presence of spirit (Wetzel)
- On German family-portraiture (Müller)
- To J. (Müller)
- Invisible writing (Wetzel)
- A wanderer's sojourn (Wetzel)
- A wanderer's evening (Wetzel)
- A wanderer's encampment (Wetzel)
- On art criticism (Ferdinand Hartmann)
- Need-and-assistance book for artists and art enthusiasts in Mildheim (Basilius von Ramdohr)
