= Michael Kohlhaas =

Novella by Heinrich von Kleist

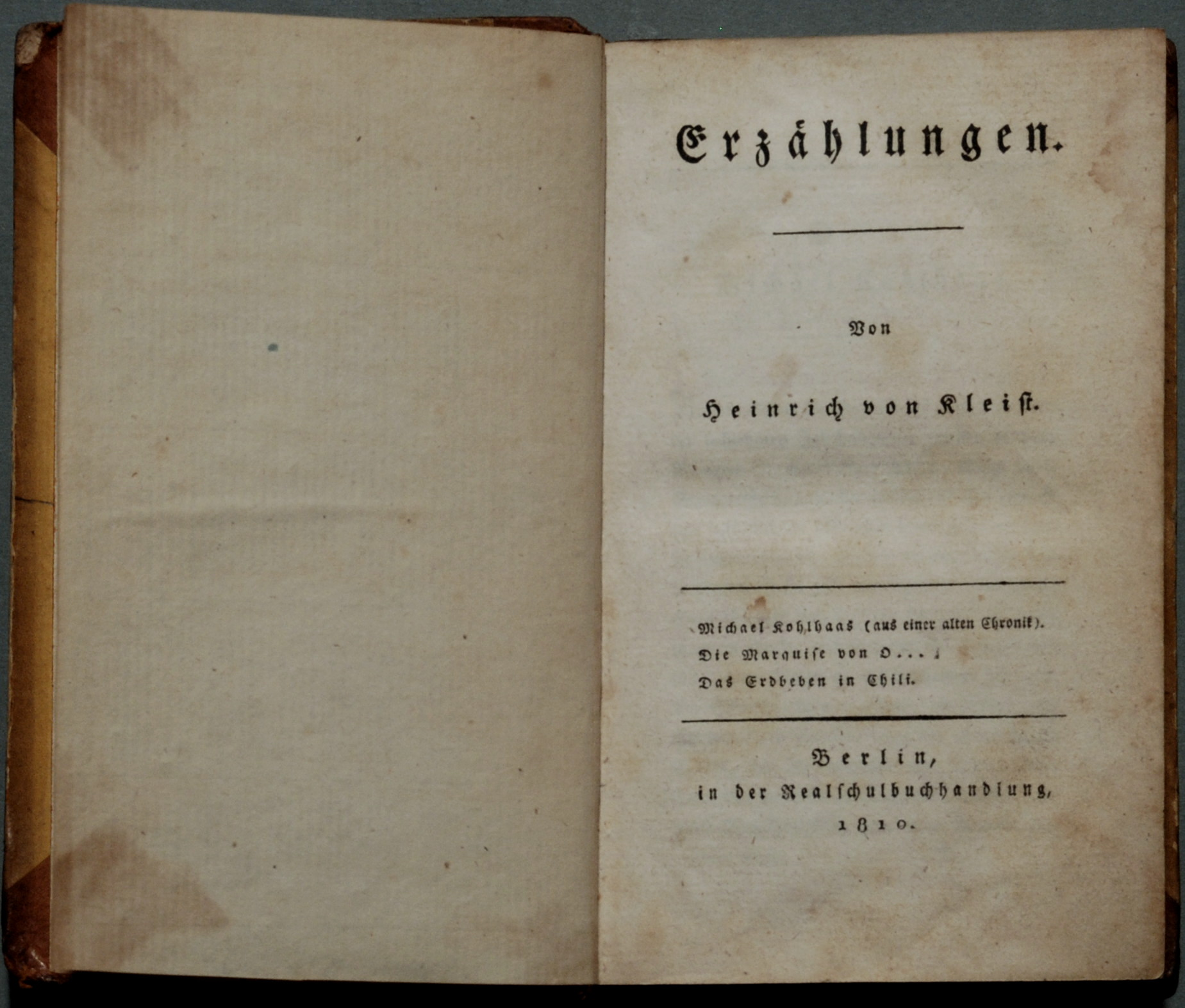
Kleist's collection Erzählungen, 1810

Michael Kohlhaas is a novella by the German author Heinrich von Kleist, based on a 16th-century story of Hans Kohlhase. Kleist published fragments of the work in volume 6 of his literary journal Phöbus in June 1808. The complete work was published in the first volume of Kleist's Erzählungen (novellas) in 1810.

Its plot depicts the wrongs done to horse trader Michael Kohlhaas by a minor aristocrat. His attempts to obtain redress through the legal system are thwarted by the aristocrat's connections. Kohlhaas gathers sympathisers to capture the miscreant, which escalates into a violent campaign against towns that take in the fleeing noble. Kohlhaas is captured and sentenced to death. Just before being executed Kohlhaas achieves some revenge by swallowing a written prophecy of great personal concern to the regional ruler.

As well as the work subtly expressing political views relevant to the time it was written, its theme of betrayed justice and its fast-moving style have resonated with many readers and authors ever since.

== The historical Kohlhase ==
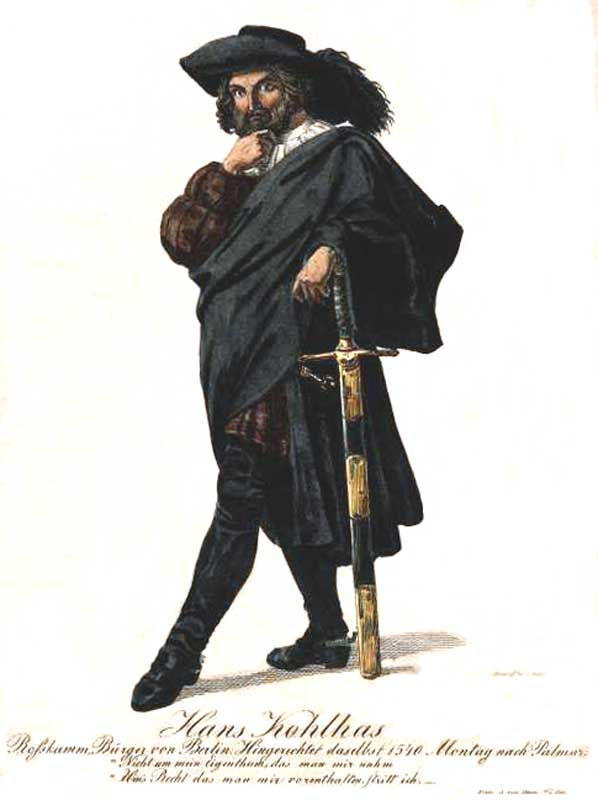
Hans Kohlhase (19th-century print)

The merchant Hans Kohlhase lived in Cölln on the Spree (now incorporated into Berlin) in the Margraviate of Brandenburg in the 16th century. In October 1532 he set out on a trip to the Leipzig Trade Fair in the neighboring Electorate of Saxony. On the way two of his horses were seized, at the command of the Junker von Zaschwitz, as a supposed fee for passage through Saxony. Kohlhase sought redress in the Saxon courts but failed to obtain it. Outraged, he issued a public challenge in 1534 and burned down houses in Wittenberg. Even a letter of admonition from Martin Luther could not dissuade him, and Kohlhase and the band he collected committed further acts of terror. In 1540 he was finally captured and tried, and was publicly broken on the wheel in Berlin on 22 March 1540. From this history Kleist fashioned a novella that dramatized a personal quest for justice in defiance of the claims of the general law and the community.

=== Political background ===
In the early 19th century, defeats in the war against Napoleon and unsettled domestic conditions (as the rulers of German kingdoms and principalities pursued various strategies of accommodation with Napoleon) contributed to a mood of dissatisfaction in Prussia.

Kleist clearly opposed France and was committed to the need for reform. He could express his political ideals through the character of Kohlhaas, without thereby making himself suspect of political agitation.

== Plot summary ==
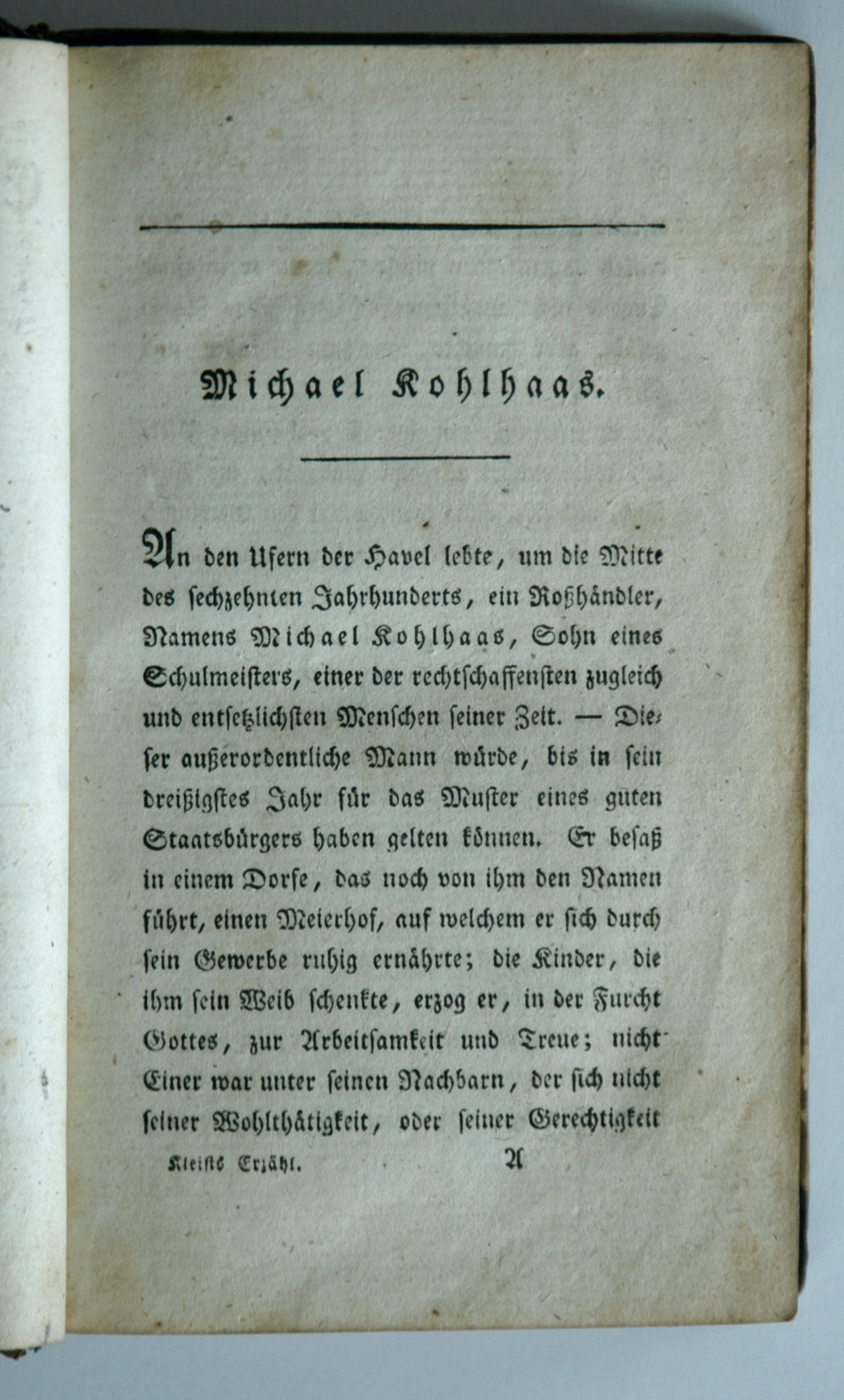
Opening of the novella, first edition, 1810

The Brandenburg horse dealer Michael Kohlhaas is leading a team of horses in the direction of Saxony when an official of the nobleman Junker Wenzel von Tronka detains him, claiming that he does not have proper transit papers. The official demands that Kohlhaas leave two horses as collateral.

In Dresden (the Saxon capital) Kohlhaas discovers that this collateral was totally arbitrary, and proceeds to demand return of his horses. When he arrives at the castle of Junker Tronka he discovers that the horses have been suffering from working in the fields and his hired man, who protested against the mistreatment of the horses, has been beaten.

Kohlhaas sues the Junker for the cost of medical treatment of his hired man and for rehabilitation of his horses. After one year he finds that the suit was turned down through political influence of the Junker's relatives. Kohlhaas persists in demanding his rights. In spite of support of a friendly politician and personal engagement of his wife (who is struck down by a guard in her attempt to deliver a petition to the Elector of Saxony and later dies of her injuries), he remains unsuccessful.

Since the administrative "old boy network" prevents any progress through legal channels, Kohlhaas resorts to criminal means. He begins a private war. Together with seven men he destroys the castle of the Junker, who in the meantime has fled to Wittenberg, and slaughters the remaining servants, including an infant. Kohlhaas frees his work-ravaged horses, but then leaves them in the castle to lead his growing mob to Wittenberg, demanding the Junker. In spite of numerous attacks on Wittenberg by his army, that grows to 400 men, he fails to secure the Junker.

Through personal intervention of Martin Luther an amnesty is arranged, whereby the Elector of Saxony approves the suit against the Junker. But the Junker again activates his influential family and Kohlhaas is thrown into a dungeon in Brandenburg.

The Elector of Brandenburg has Kohlhaas released, but in the meantime Saxony has informed the Kaiser in Vienna. The ruling families in Vienna feel this threat to the authority of the aristocracy must be handled with severity. In spite of surprising efforts of the Elector of Brandenburg to save Kohlhaas, he is sentenced to death. Later it turns out that Kohlhaas has on his person a slip of paper that contains a gypsy's detailed prophecy of the future of the House of Saxony.

As Kohlhaas is led to execution, he sees in the crowd the disguised Elector of Saxony. Through his lawyer, he is informed that his suit against the Junker has been successful, and is presented with compensation for the injuries of his hired man and shown the horses, now well-fed and healthy. Pleased that justice has been served, he submits willingly to the execution. However, shortly before being beheaded, he opens the amulet on his neck containing the slip of paper with the gypsy's prophecy and swallows it. The Elector of Saxony is so distressed by the loss of the prophecy of his family's future that he faints, and Kohlhaas is beheaded shortly thereafter.

== Translations into English ==
- John Oxenford: in Tales from the German, Comprising Specimens from the Most Celebrated Authors (1844)
- Frances H. King: in The German Classics of the Nineteenth and Twentieth Centuries, Vol. IV, edited by Kuno Francke (1914)
- Martin Greenberg: in The Marquise of O— and Other Stories (Criterion, 1960)
- David Luke and Nigel Reeves: in The Marquise of O— and Other Stories (Penguin, 1978)
- David Constantine: in Kleist: Selected Writings (J.M. Dent, 1997)
- Peter Wortsman: in Selected Prose of Heinrich von Kleist (Archipelago Books, 2009)
- Michael Hofmann: Michael Kohlhaas (New Directions, 2020)

== Influence ==
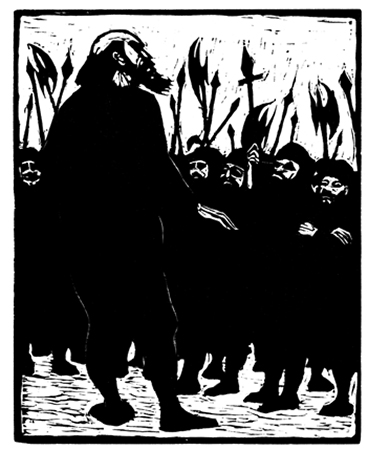
"Disbands His Gang", from Woodcuts for Heinrich von Kleist's Michael Kohlhaas (1953/2003) by Jacob Pins

Franz Kafka devoted one of only two public appearances in his whole life to reading passages from Michael Kohlhaas. Kafka said that he "could not even think of" this work "without being moved to tears and enthusiasm."

The 1969 film Michael Kohlhaas – der Rebell by Volker Schlöndorff and the 2013 film Michael Kohlhaas by Arnaud des Pallières were direct adaptations of Kleist's story.

In 1973, Péter Hajnóczy, a Hungarian writer wrote a short story A fűtő (The heater) which is based on Kleist's work.

András Sütő, a Hungarian writer wrote a play in 1974 Egy lócsiszár virágvasárnapja (A horse rider's Palm Sunday) which is a re-telling of the story.

The story of Michael Kohlhaas had an influence on E. L. Doctorow's 1975 novel Ragtime, which uses similar plot elements and has a protagonist named "Coalhouse Walker". Doctorow himself called his book "a quite deliberate hommage" to Kleist's story. Fredric Jameson references this relation in his 1991 book, Postmodernism, or, the Cultural Logic of Late Capitalism. The Broadway musical Ragtime was subsequently based on Doctorow’s novel.

The Pillars of Society (1982) by Leif G. W. Persson begins with an epigraph referring to the agony of Hans Kohlhase on the wheel.

J. M. Coetzee's 1983 novel Life & Times of Michael K is influenced by this novel.

The opening sentence of the 1985 novel Das Parfum by German writer Patrick Süskind is an homage to the opening sentence of Michael Kohlhaas.

The theatrical work Kohlhaas (1990) by Italian playwright and actor Marco Baliani is a direct adaptation of Kleist's book. In 2017 the Italian play was translated into Spanish by Beatriz Castellary and interpreted by Riccardo Rigamonti. Romagnol poet Raffaello Baldini counted the novella among his influences.

The 1999 film The Jack Bull by John Badham was loosely based on this book which was also a major source of inspiration for Andrey Zvyagintsev's 2014 film Leviathan.

The 1999 play Közellenség (Public Enemy) by Hungarian writer István Tasnádi tells the story of Kohlhaas from the viewpoint of the two black horses.

German-speaking medical professionals have coined the term "Kohlhaas syndrome" to indicate a personality type exhibiting a compulsive need of being right, although the term is not used widely.

A 2007 Israeli film Foul Gesture was based on the idea from the novella.
