= Man on Horseback =

1969 film

- German poster
- Directed by: Volker Schlöndorff
- Written by: Edward Bond; Volker Schlöndorff; Clement Biddle Wood
- Based on: Michael Kohlhaas by Heinrich von Kleist
- Produced by: Jerry Bick; Rob Houwer
- Starring: David Warner
- Cinematography: Willy Kurant
- Edited by: Claus von Boro
- Music by: Stanley Myers
- Production companies: Houwer-Film; Oceanic Filmproduktion GmbH
- Distributed by: Columbia Film-Verleih
- Release date: 11 April 1969 (West Germany)
- Running time: 99 minutes
- Country: West Germany
- Languages: English; German

Man on Horseback (German: Michael Kohlhaas – der Rebell) is a 1969 West German drama film directed by Volker Schlöndorff based on the novel Michael Kohlhaas by Heinrich von Kleist. It was entered into the 1969 Cannes Film Festival. Another film based on the book was released at the 2013 Cannes Film Festival.

== Cast ==
- David Warner as Michael Kohlhaas
- Anna Karina as Elisabeth Kohlhaas
- Thomas Holtzmann as Martin Luther
- Michael Gothard as John
- Kurt Meisel as Kanzler
- Anton Diffring as Kurfürst
- Gregor von Rezzori as Kunz
- Peter Weiss as Richter (as Peter Weiß)
- Anita Pallenberg as Katrina, Marketenderin
- Relja Bašić as Nagel (as Relia Basic)
- Inigo Jackson as Wenzel von Tronka
- Václav Lohniský as Herse
- Anthony May as Peter
- Tim Ray as Tony
- Ivan Palúch as Stern (as Ivan Palluch)
- Emanuel Schmied as Verwalter
- Erich Aberle as Bürgermeister
- Zdeněk Kryzánek]as 1. Jurist
- Karel Krisanek as 2. Jurist
- Keith Richards as Soldier

== See also ==
- The Jack Bull (1999)
- Age of Uprising: The Legend of Michael Kohlhaas (2013)
