= Heimo Erbse =

German composer

Heimo Erbse (27 February 1924 – 22 September 2005) was a German composer from Rudolstadt.

Erbse studied in Weimar, and then worked from 1947 to 1950 in the theater before studying under Blacher in 1950. He lived most of his life in Austria.

== Works ==
- Julietta opera semiseria op. 15 (1957), after the novel "Die Marquise von O..." of Heinrich von Kleist, first performed 17 August 1959 at the Salzburger Festspiele (Antal Dorati/Rita Streich/Sieglinde Wagner/Gerhard Stolze/Walter Berry/Alois Pernerstorfer/Elisabeth Höngen/Wiener Philharmoniker)
- Ruth Ballett (1958), op. 16, after the Old Testament, first performed 1959 at the Wiener Staatsoper
- Pavimento (1961), op. 19, for large orchestra
- Der Herr in Grau, opera op. 24 (1965/66)
- Der Deserteur Oper (1983)
- Triple Concerto for Violin, Cello, Piano and Orchestra, op. 32, 1973
- Piano Concerto op. 22
- Impression for orchestra op. 9
- Ein Traumspiel (August Strindberg)
- Leonce und Lena (Georg Büchner)
- Symphony No. 1, 1963/64
- Symphony No. 2, 1969/70
- Symphony No. 3, 1990
- Symphony No. 4, 1992
- Symphony No. 5, 1993
- Sinfonietta giocosa, 1956
- 6 Miniatures for piano, strings, and percussion, 1951
- String Quartet No. 2, 1987
- 5 Orchestral Songs after G. Trakl, baritone and orchestra, 1969
