= The Duel (Kleist novella) =

1811 novella by Heinrich von Kleist

- Author: Heinrich von Kleist
- Original title: Der Zweikampf
- Language: German
- Publisher: Realschulbuchhandlung
- Publication date: 1811
- Publication place: Prussia
- Pages: 77

The Duel (German: Der Zweikampf) is an 1811 novella by the German writer Heinrich von Kleist. Set in the late 14th century, it follows the murder investigation after a duke is assassinated amid a conflict over the succession to the throne of the Holy Roman Empire.

It was first printed in the second part of Kleist's story collection Erzählungen, published by the Realschulbuchhandlung in Berlin. It was for a long time regarded as one of Kleist's lesser works, for example by Ludwig Tieck. It received more attention in the 20th century, when it was analyzed as a precursor to later whodunit stories and a work where uncertainty plays a major role.
