= Disneyland, mon vieux pays natal =

2000 documentary by Arnaud des Pallières

- Directed by: Arnaud des Pallières
- Written by: Arnaud des Pallières
- Produced by: Arnaud des Pallières
- Music by: Martin Wheeler
- Production companies: Les Films d'ici Arte France
- Release date: 2000
- Running time: 46 minutes
- Country: France
- Language: French

Disneyland, mon vieux pays natal (lit. Disneyland, My Old Homeland) is a 2000 French experimental documentary film written, produced and directed by Arnaud des Pallières. The film consists primarily of footage shot at Disneyland Paris in France.

== Synopsis ==
On Monday, 12 June 2000, a man travels by train to Disneyland Paris. He ruminates about the legend of the Pied Piper of Hamelin, a man hired by the town of Hamelin to lure away a swarm of rats with his magic pipe. According to the legend, he successfully drives the rats away but is not compensated for his work. He later uses his pipe to lead all of the children of Hamelin into a cave hidden in a mountain, never to be seen again. The narrator thinks of the many people who travel to visit Disneyland Paris as having "[come] under the spell of Disneyland's pied piper".

An animated face named Engrid greets Disneyland visitors with "bienvenue, humain" ("welcome, human"). The face periodically asks questions throughout the film, such as "when you travel through the universe, do you locate yourself with a map or do you find your way with your internal compass?" and "If you were a bird, which bird would you be? An owl or a dove?"

While riding the Big Thunder Mountain roller coaster, the narrator ponders the nature of childhood and reality. He recalls meeting a park employee who wears a character costume of Goofy, and who was elected staff representative by his costumed co-workers. This Goofy met with management to complain about the costumes, which are described as uncomfortable in both winter and summer, and difficult to see through and breathe in. Management assured Goofy that the costumed employees' concerns would be taken under consideration, and Goofy returned to his work.

The narrator describes watching a parade, during which a Disneyland employee leads a dancer away from the procession to a young blind girl. The girl touches the dancer's face, body and costume, and the narrator remarks that "Disneyland was made for the blind". The narrator recounts meeting a retired widow named Mr. Robert, whose wife died of cancer. Mr. Robert said that he is visiting the park for the week, and is doing so for personal rather than professional reasons. The narrator relates to Mr. Robert a Rudyard Kipling story titled The House of Desires, which tells of a woman who dies of cancer; he wonders if it was a good idea to have told Mr. Robert that story.

A number of costumed characters in the park are shown interacting with visitors, including children. The narrator describes the characters as stiff and awkward, more so than the employees within the costumes realise. The narrator recalls speaking to the captain of one of the Disneyland riverboats. The captain tells him about a shy passenger who once jumped from his boat as it was docking. The captain jumped into the water after her, rescuing her from being crushed between the boat and the dock, and she thanked him as if he "had picked up her handkerchief".

The narrator recollects a dream he had while sleeping in the Disneyland Hotel, in which Mickey Mouse had turned into a real, non-anthropomorphic mouse, and was rumoured to have been killed by a mousetrap. The narrator thinks the dream may indicate that he is "adapting [himself] to Disneyland".

Engrid analyses the answers it received to its questions, and determines that the respondent is idealistic, and prefers to explore the "dark area" of their mind. Engrid notes the importance of balancing sadness and joy. The narrator remarks that "the painful melancholy" of his childhood memories still affects him. He describes Disneyland as empty, but that it "reminds us of our childhood." He concludes that children "love life", and that "nothing forces them to love the life they have".

== Production ==
Disneyland, mon vieux pays natal was shot primarily at Disneyland Paris. Writer-director Arnaud des Pallières negotiated with park officials about what he was allowed to film at the park, and they provided him with a list of prohibitions. A contract was signed, and des Pallières recalled that "I had access to what I wanted". He was accompanied by two communication managers during filming.
