= Hannah Farnham Sawyer Lee =

American novelist

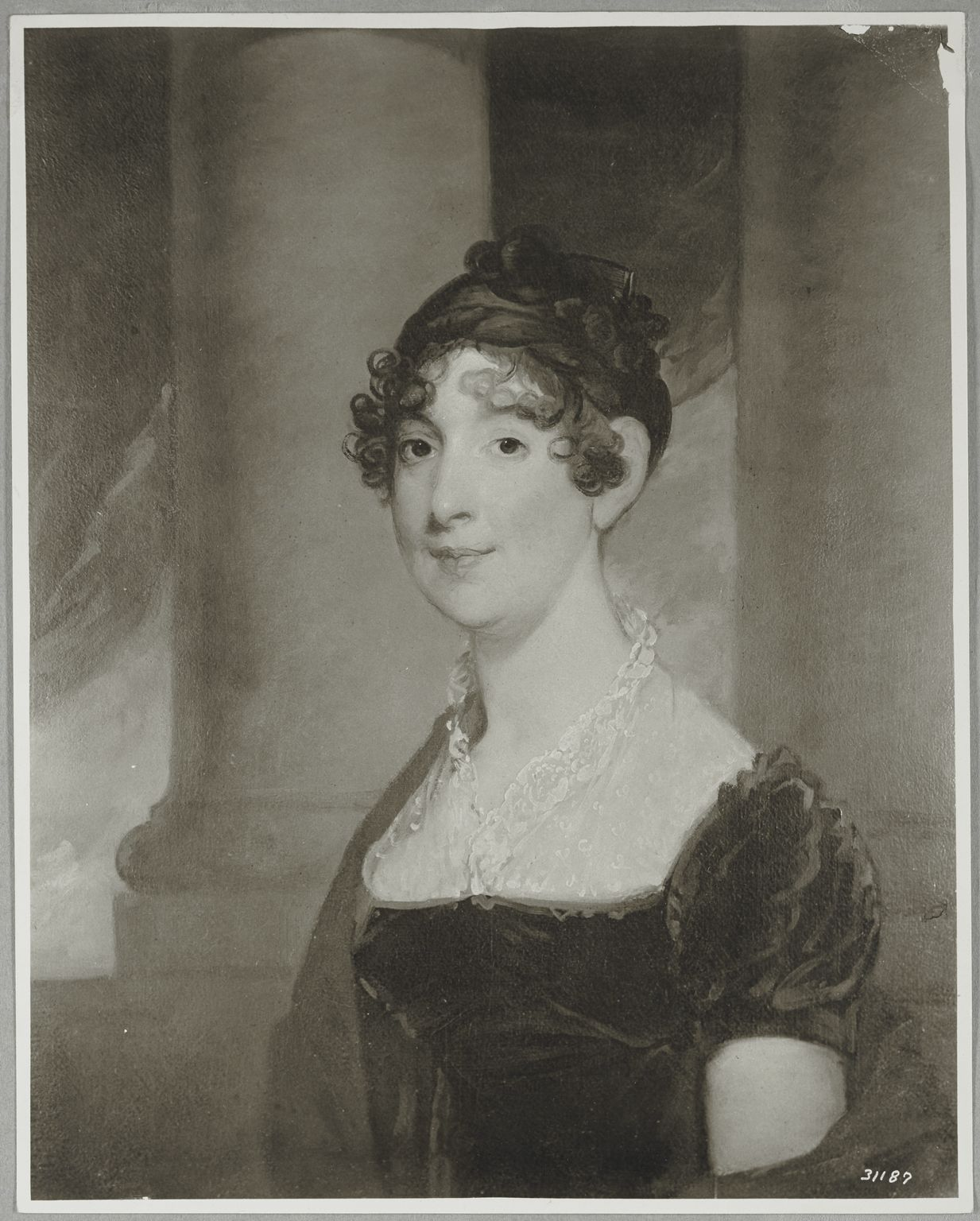
- portrait by Gilbert Stuart
- Born: November 5, 1780; Newburyport
- Died: December 27, 1865 (aged 85); Boston
- Occupation: Writer
- Spouse(s): George Gardner Lee
- Parent(s): Micajah Sawyer

Hannah Farnham Sawyer Lee (November 5, 1780-December 27, 1865) was an American writer, best known for her 1837 novelette Three Experiments of Living which was published in more than 30 editions in the United States, and 10 in England. Lee was a popular novelist during her life, though her writing was not lauded and her success is now largely forgotten.

== Life ==
Lee was born in 1780 to physician Micajah Sawyer and Sibyll Farnham, in Newburyport, Massachusetts. She married George Gardiner Lee of Boston in 1807, on the same day her sister Mary Anna married Philip Jeremiah Schuyler. George Lee died in 1816 leaving Lee with three young daughters. She then went to live with her brother William Sawyer, until his death in 1858. She died at age 85 in Boston in December 1865.

== Writing ==
Lee wrote an appendix to an autobiography of Hannah Adams in 1832, which older sources often cite as her first publication, although her little-noticed novel Grace Seymour was first published in 1830. Three Experiments of Living (1837), arising out of the financial crises of the Panic of 1837 was a bestseller for many years. According to the publisher, 20,000 copies were sold in its first two months of publication. It was followed by a successful sequel Elinor Fulton. Three Experiments was in print for almost fifty years. Lee also wrote a number of non-fiction histories. The success of Three Experiments was illustrated by the quick imitations such as Fourth Experiment of Living: Living Without Means by Horatio Hastings Weld.

== Bibliography (incomplete) ==
- Grace Seymour (1830)
- The Backslider (1835)
- Three Experiments of Living (novel) (1837)
- Elinor Fulton (1837)
- The Contrast, or Modes of Education (1837)
- The Harcourts (1837)
- Rich Enough: A Tale of the Times (1837)
- Historical Sketches of the Old Painters (1838)
- The Life and Times of Martin Luther (1839)
- Rosanna, or Scenes in Boston (1839)
- The Life and Times of Thomas Cranmer (1841)
- Tales (1842)
- The Huguenots in France and America (1843)
- The World Before You, or the Log Cabin (1847)
- Stories from Life (1849)
- Sketches and Stories From Life: For The Young (1850)
- Memoir of Pierre Toussaint (1853)
- Familiar Sketches of Sculptors and Sculpture (1854)
