= The Marquise of O =

1808 Novel by Heinrich von Kleist

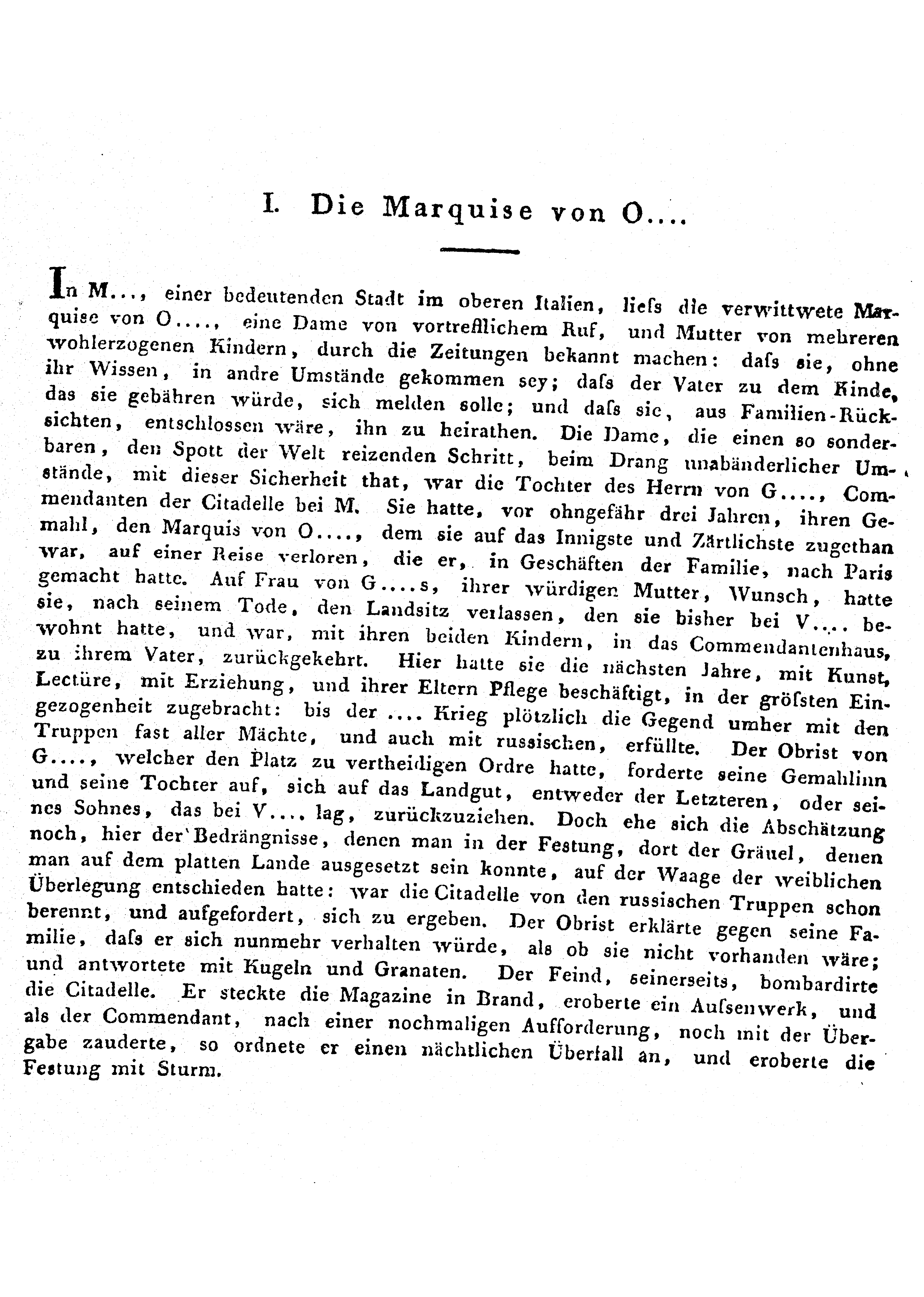
First page of the novella

The Marquise of O (German: Die Marquise von O....) is a novella by Heinrich von Kleist on the subject of forced seduction. It was first published in 1808.

== Synopsis ==
The story begins with a one-sentence paragraph – the widowed Marquise von O. places an announcement in the newspapers in a prominent north Italian town, saying she is pregnant and wishes the father of her child to come to her so she can marry him.

We learn Marquise is the daughter of Colonel G. He commanded the citadel of the town M. During the Napoleonic Wars in Italy, while the citadel was over-run by Russian forces, the Marquise was about to be gang-raped by Russian soldiers. However, she is saved by the Russian commander, Count F., appearing to her like an angel. After he brings her to safety, she falls unconscious. The Count finishes storming the citadel, attaining the surrender of the last pockets of resistance, and garrisoning the fort with his troopers. He leaves before the Marquise can thank him. The Marquise and her parents receive news shortly thereafter that Count F. was killed. His last words are reported as "Julietta, this bullet avenges you!" ("Julietta! Diese Kugel rächt dich!" in the original German). The Marquise is intrigued someone the Count knows so well should have her name of 'Julietta'.

The reports of Count F.'s death prove false, however. At the conclusion of the war, the Count appears at the house of Colonel G. to ask to marry the Marquise. He insists they marry immediately, although he seems to understand it is an unreasonable request, since they hardly know one another. The family suggests the Count can stay at their home so the two can get to know each other. The Count cannot accept this offer, though, because he has a pressing military duty in another town. Therefore, the family agrees the Count should leave to perform his military duty, and the Marquise will entertain no other prospective husbands in his absence. While he is away, the Marquise realizes she is pregnant. Although the symptoms of her pregnancy are clear, she and her mother are reluctant to believe it. They accept the reality after it is confirmed by a doctor and a midwife.

The Colonel kicks the Marquise out of his house, forbidding her to return despite her mother's protests. She moves to her deceased husband's estate in V. Meanwhile, the Count returns to M., hears the news of the Marquise's pregnancy, seems unsurprised, and tells the Marquise's brother he is convinced of her innocence. The Marquise's brother speaks ill of his sister, and questions the Count's sanity, given the latter's consistent interest in marrying the Marquise. The Count decides to visit her in V. After he is turned away by the porter, he enters through the garden and again begs the Marquise to marry him. She runs into the house, and locks the door.

The Marquise publishes her announcement in the newspaper, asking the father of the unborn child to step forward and reveal his identity since she is resolved to marry the person who put her in this situation. The next day, the newspaper prints another announcement, saying the father will be at the Colonel's house on the 3rd at eleven o’clock. The Colonel is furious, believing this is a ploy by his daughter to delude them into believing she is innocent. The Colonel's wife, however, goes to visit the Marquise. She tells the Marquise she knows the father... he is the groom, Leopardo, a servant of the household. After the Marquise seems to accept this for the truth, her mother reveals the trick, and says she believes the Marquise's innocence. She brings the Marquise back to M., and tells the Colonel to apologize. She leaves the Colonel and the Marquise non-chaperoned. After she returns, the Marquise is sitting in her father's lap while he is kissing her ardently on the lips "like a lover!" ("wie ein Verliebter!"); the Colonel's wife is pleased. They eagerly await the arrival of the mysterious father, and agree, unless he is below her status, the Marquise should marry him immediately. At the appointed hour, Leopardo walks in... to announce Count F.

The Colonel's wife is satisfied, because she knows the Count is well-off and of good character from her earlier investigations, but the Marquise is visibly upset, and says she was willing to marry "a vicious man" ("einen Lasterhaften") but not a devil. Her parents believe she is crazy, and agree she should marry the Count, as per her agreement. She agrees, unhappily, and the Colonel and the Count draw up a contract stipulating the Count is entitled to none of the rights of marriage... yet is bound by all its duties. They are married the following day. Their son is born, and the Count makes the boy a gift of 20,000 rubles, then makes the Marquise (now the Countess) his sole heir. Eventually, the Countess comes to be happy with him; and they celebrate a second marriage, a much happier one.

=== Analysis, discussion of their relationship ===
The rape is not explicitly indicated in the book, and scholars do not all agree on how important the rape is, or whether it happened at all, one of them arguing against the concept of rape and instead, the Marquise sought sexual gratification from the Count. It happens, if it happens, in a dash: Then—the officer, a dash which one scholar calls "the most-delicately accomplished rape in our literature".

== Translations into English ==
- Martin Greenberg: in The Marquise of O— and Other Stories (Criterion, 1960)
- David Luke: in The Marquise of O— and Other Stories (Penguin, 1978)
- David Constantine: in Kleist: Selected Writings (J.M. Dent, 1997)
- Richard Stokes: The Marquise of O– (Hesperus, 2003)
- Peter Wortsman: in Selected Prose of Heinrich von Kleist (Archipelago Books, 2009)
- Nicholas Jacobs: The Marquise of O– (Pushkin Press, 2020)

== Adaptations ==
The novella was adapted as a film in 1976, directed by Éric Rohmer. It stars Edith Clever, Bruno Ganz, Peter Lühr, and Edda Seipel.

The Italian film Il seme della discordia is a modern adaptation of the novella.

The 1959 opera Julietta by Heimo Erbse is based on the novella.
