= Wilhelm Nienstädt =

Prussian playwright (1784–1862)

Wilhelm Nienstädt (16 October 1784 – 28 April 1862) was a Prussian playwright and tutor to Prince Albert of Prussia from 1815 to 1823.

== Early life ==
Nienstädt was born in Geitelde (now Braunschweig). The son of a minister, he studied theology at Helmstedt and Göttingen. In 1808 Nienstädt contributed the essay On Didactic Poetry to the literary journal Phöbus, published by Heinrich von Kleist and Adam Heinrich Müller.

== Career ==
After graduation, he took a two-year trip or Bildungsreise, probably to Italy, and worked as a tutor for various aristocratic families, including the houses of Count Häseler and Count von Voß. On the recommendation of the future Prussian Foreign Minister Friedrich Ancillon, in 1815 he was appointed tutor of Prince Albert of Prussia (1809-1872), the son of Frederick William III, and over the next ten years he produced many works, including the play Ein Zaubertag (1816), the essay Versuch einer Darstellung unser Zeit (1819), and the collection of poems Gedichte vermischten Inhalts (1820), which includes some drama and ballads, as well as the epic Olint and Elvire.

In 1822, Nienstädt was appointed to the geheimer Hofrat, but was honourably discharged after a short time, with a pension, and in 1826, he published the seven-part drama cycle Die Hohenstaufen and the play Karl V. In 1829 he left Berlin for Hallendorf, a village near Salzgitter and married Johanna Henriette Augusta Pauli, also the child of a minister. The rest of his life is very obscure and his activities unknown. He died in Wolfenbüttel, aged 77.

== Significance ==
Nienstädt's conservative pessimism, inspired by Fichte, sees a break in cultural continuity around 1500 with the invention of printing, which made the Reformation possible, with the widespread use of gunpowder and with the Discovery of America by Christopher Columbus. He praises the falling away of religious dogmatism but deplores the competition, political jockeying, alienation and individualism brought about by the Enlightenment, which he sees as the victory of ratiocination over love and tradition. Nienstädt was a monarchist and rejected the French Revolution in its entirety.

Only the Hohenstaufen dramas, inspired by the work of the historian Friedrich von Raumer, had any detectable influence on German literature of the ensuing decades.
