= Ernst August Friedrich Klingemann =

German writer (1777–1831)

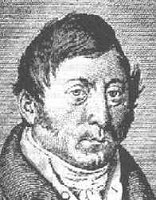

Ernst August Friedrich Klingemann (31 August 1777 in Braunschweig – 25 January 1831 in Braunschweig) was a German writer. He is generally agreed to be the author of the 1804 novel Nachtwachen (Nightwatches) under the pseudonym Bonaventura.

== Life ==
As a young boy, Klingemann developed an interest in the theatre which would last his whole life. After he completed his education at the Collegium Carolinum in Braunschweig, he went to Jena in 1798 to study law and philosophy. There he heard lectures by Johann Gottlieb Fichte, Friedrich Wilhelm Joseph von Schelling and August Wilhelm Schlegel and became friends with Clemens Brentano. However, in 1801 he left Jena and returned to Braunschweig, where he became editor of Zeitung für die elegante Welt (Newspaper for the Elegant World).

In 1810 Klingemann married Elise Anschuetz, an actress. In 1818 he became the director of the Braunschweiger Theatre. Under Klingemann the Braunschweiger theatre soon acquired a good reputation. It was here that the first performance of Johann Wolfgang von Goethe’s Faust (Part 1) was staged, on 19 January 1829. In the same year Klingemann accepted a professorship at his old school, the Collegium Carolinum but only one year later he was once again the director at the theatre.

In 1831 Ernst August Friedrich Klingemann died. He is buried in the Magni cemetery in Braunschweig.

== Authorship of Nachtwachen ==
The authorship of Nachtwachen was disputed for a long time. It has been attributed to, among others, Clemens Brentano, Friedrich Schlegel, Caroline Schelling and Karl Friedrich Gottlob Wetzel. Jean Paul was of the opinion that Friedrich Schelling was the author, having noticed some similarities with his Gianozzo. Scholars today, however, are in general agreement that Bonaventura was Klingemann. The crucial evidence is a handwritten list by Klingemann found among other papers in the university library of Amsterdam by Ruth Haag.

== Works ==
Klingemann wrote many novels and dramas, which are written in the spirit of Romanticism and enjoyed large popularity at that time. Only his most famous, The Nightwatches of Bonaventura, has been recently translated:

- The Nightwatches of Bonaventura. Translated and with a new Introduction by Gerald Gillespie. Chicago: University of Chicago Press, 2014.

=== Novels ===
- Wildgraf Eckard von der Wölpe (1795)
- Die Ruinen im Schwarzwalde (The Ruins in the Black Forest) (1797-1799)
- Romano (1800-1801)
- Albano, der Lautenspieler (1803)
- Die Lazzaroni (1803)
- Nachtwachen. Von Bonaventura (1804)

=== Plays ===
- Die Asseburg. Historisch-romantisches Gemählde (1796/1797)
- Die Maske (The Mask) (1797)
- Selbstgefühl (1800)
- Freimüthigkeiten (1804)
- Der Schweizerbund (The Swiss Federation) (1804-1805)
- Der Lazzaroni oder Der Bettler von Neapel (The Beggar of Naples) (1806)
- Heinrich von Wolfenschießen (1806)
- Columbus (1808)
- Heinrich der Löwe (Heinrich the Lion) (1808)
- Schill oder Das Deklamatorium zu Krähwinkel (1812)
- Moses. A dramatic Poem. (1812)
- Faust (1815)
- Don Quixote and Sancho Panza. Dramatic Play with Singing. (1815)
- Deutsche Treue (German Loyalty) (1816)
- Die Grube zur Dorothea (1817)
- Das Kreuz im Norden (The Cross in the North) (1818)
- Ahasver (1827)
- Melpomene (2 Dramas: The Bride of Kynast; Bianca di Sepolcro) (1830)

== Bibliography ==
- Ruth Haag: "Noch einmal. Der Verfasser der 'Nachtwachen von Bonaventura'". 1804. In: Euphorion. Bd. 81 (1987)
- Kenneth Ralston: The captured horizon. Heidegger and the "Nachtwachen von Bonaventura". Tübingen: Max Niemeyer Verlag, 1994.
