= Dick Cusack =

American actor (1925–2003)

- Born: Richard John Cusack; August 29, 1925; New York City, U.S.
- Died: June 2, 2003 (aged 77); Evanston, Illinois, U.S.
- Education: College of the Holy Cross (BA)
- Occupations: Actor, documentary filmmaker, playwright
- Years active: 1970–2003
- Spouse: Ann Carolan (m. 1960)
- Children: 5, including Ann, Joan and John

Richard John Cusack (/ˈkjuːsæk/ KEW-sak; August 29, 1925 – June 2, 2003) was an American actor, documentary filmmaker and playwright.

== Early life ==
Cusack was born Richard John Cusack on August 29, 1925, in New York City, the son of Margaret Cusack (née McFeeley) and Dennis Joseph Cusack. His family was of Irish Catholic background. He served with the U.S. Army in the Philippines in World War II. After the war, he graduated from the College of the Holy Cross in Worcester, Massachusetts, where he played basketball with Bob Cousy and roomed with Philip F. Berrigan, the peace activist.

== Career ==
Until 1970, Cusack worked as a Clio Award-winning advertising executive.

He then pursued a career as a film actor, beginning with minor roles. Most of his acting roles were playing authority figures, such as a United States Senate chairman, minister/chaplain, and U.S. secretary of state. He played a judge in the TV movie Overexposed and in the theatrical releases Things Change and Eight Men Out.

Cusack was a documentary filmmaker. He also owned a film production company.

He was honored with an award from the Evanston Arts Council for preserving a school and converting it into the Noyes Cultural Arts Center, which houses the Piven Theatre Workshop where his famous acting children trained. Two weeks before his death, he completed the final draft of a play to memorialize his former college roommate entitled, Backoff Barkman, which was produced posthumously in the Midwest.

== Personal life ==
Cusack married his wife, Ann Paula "Nancy" (née Carolan; 1929–2022) in 1960. Together they had five children: Ann Cusack, Joan Cusack, Bill Cusack, John Cusack and Susie Cusack, all of whom followed him into the acting profession. Circa 1963–1966, the Cusack family moved from New York City to Evanston, Illinois, where the five children grew up.

== Death ==
Cusack died on June 2, 2003, in Evanston, Illinois, from pancreatic cancer, aged 77.

== Filmography ==
=== Film ===
Year	Title	Role	Notes
1980	My Bodyguard	Principal	
1983	Class	Chaplain Baker	
1984	The Lost Honor of Kathryn Beck	Unknown	Television film
1988	Eight Men Out	Judge Friend	
1988	Things Change	Judge	
1989	The Package	Secretary of State	
1990	Crazy People	Mort	
1992	Overexposed	Judge	Television film
1993	The Fugitive	Attorney Walter Gutherie	
1995	While You Were Sleeping	Doctor Rubin	
1996	Evil Has a Face	Lester	Television film
1996	Chain Reaction	Senate Chairman	
1999	The Jack Bull	Jury Foreman	Television film, writer
2000	High Fidelity	Minister	
2000	Return to Me	Mr. Bennington	Final film role

=== Television ===
Year	Title	Role	Notes
1994	Missing Persons	Champion	Episode: "If You Could Pick Your Own Parents..."
1987	Sable	Mahoney	Episode: "Watchdogs"
1997	Early Edition	Elderly Man	Episode: "The Wall: Part 2"

== Awards ==
Year	Award	Result	Notes
2000	Commitment to Chicago Award	Won	Shared with his wife and children
