= St. Cecilia, or the Power of Music =

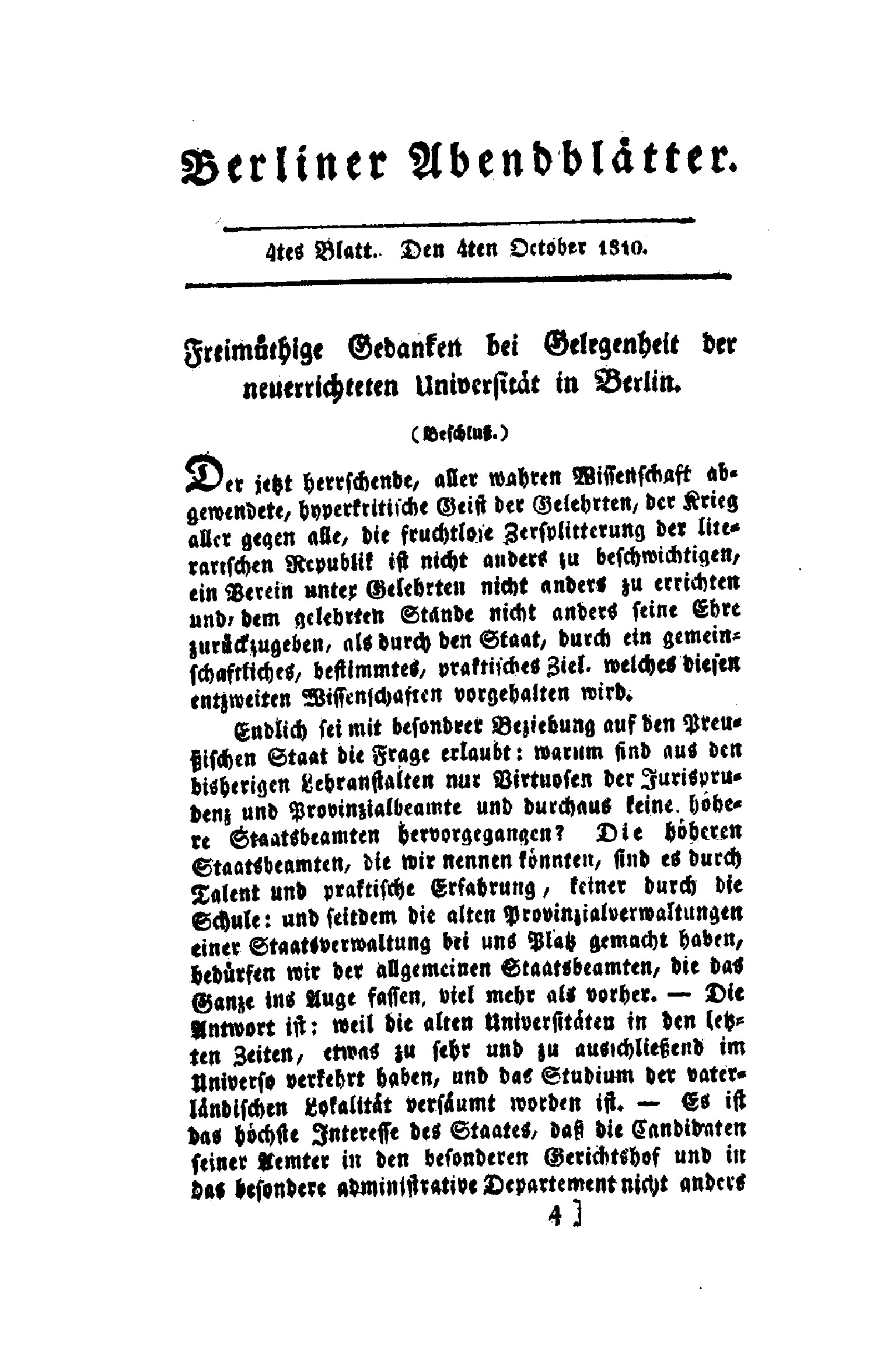
power of music.

"St. Cecilia, or the Power of Music" (German: Die heilige Cäcilie oder die Gewalt der Musik) is a short story by the German author Heinrich von Kleist. The story was written on October 27, 1810 as a gift for daughter of his friend Adam Müller, and was first published in November 1810 in Kleist's literary journal, the Berliner Abendblätter.

== Plot summary ==
The story begins with the arrival of three brothers and a fourth, a predicant, in Aachen at the end of the sixteenth century. The brothers, all four of them avowed Bilderstürmer, decide to attack the convent in the city during a festival celebration. When they arrive, however, they are overcome by the music being played by the nuns of the convent, and the attack is aborted.

Six years later, the mother of the young men arrives in Aachen. She enquires about the whereabouts of her sons, and is told that four young men meeting their description are in residence in the city's house for the insane. She goes to visit them and discovers that they spend their days dressed as monks, praying in front of a crucifix, and singing the Gloria in excelsis Deo. They appear to be severely mentally disturbed and incapable of functioning in normal society; many of the city's residents describe them as insane.

Finally, the mother decides to visit the nuns of the convent where her sons' transformation took place, where she learns that the exact circumstances of that day were quite mysterious: the nun who was said to have been conducting the orchestra during the mass on that day had actually been confined to bed with a severe fever during the mass, and no one is quite sure who actually directed the orchestra that played the music that overcame the four men. The nuns attribute this to a work of God, who they believe intervened to save the convent from destruction.

In the end of the story, the mother returns home and her sons remain in the madhouse, where they live out their lives and die a peaceful death at an old age.
