= Elijah Parish =

New England clergyman

Elijah Parish (November 7, 1762– October 15, 1825) was a New England clergyman of the early nineteenth century.

Parish was a native of Lebanon, Connecticut. He graduated from Dartmouth College in 1785. In the early nineteenth century he was a leading opponent of the Jeffersonian Republican Party and brought issues of slavery into his political discourse. Parish was elected a member of the American Antiquarian Society in 1813.

== Sources ==
- Parish biography
- Mason, Matthew. Slavery and Politics in the Early American Republic. (2006) ISBN 978-0-8078-3049-9.
