= The Theatre Considered as a Moral Institution =

1784 essay by German playwright Friedrich Schiller

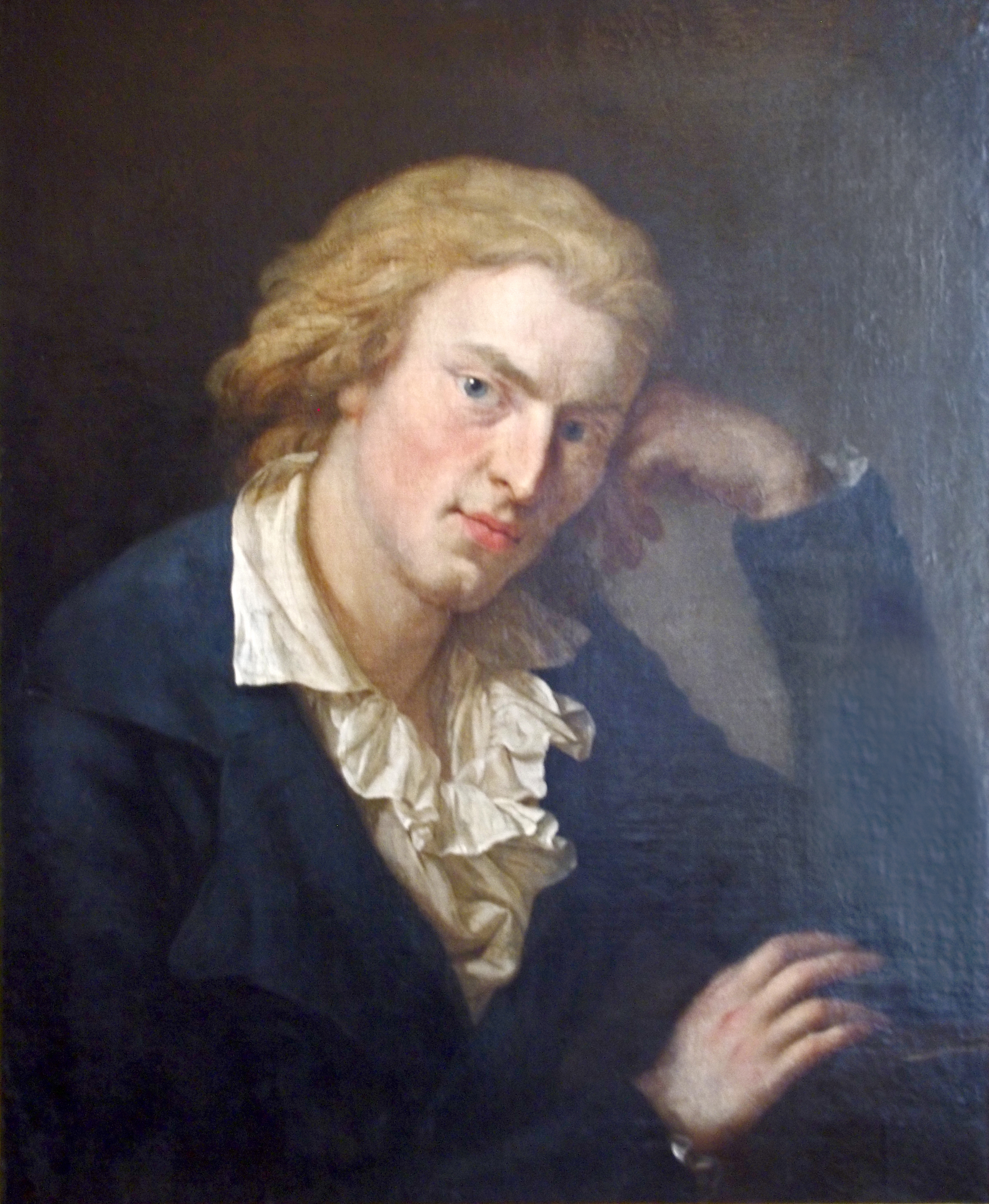
Portrait of Schiller by Anton Graff, c. 1786–91

"The Theatre Considered as a Moral Institution" (German: "Die Schaubühne als eine moralische Anstalt betrachtet") was an essay delivered by playwright Friedrich Schiller on 26 June 1784 to the Deutschen Gesellschaft society. The essay was later published.

In the essay, Schiller asked, "What can a good permanent theatre actually achieve?" (Was kann eine gute stehende Schaubühne eigentlich bewirken?)

== Context ==
In January 1784 Schiller (then aged just 24) was accepted into the Deutschen Gesellschaft, a language society whose members aimed to improve morals and purify the German language. Schiller's position at the Mannheim theater became increasingly dubious in the summer of 1784. With his speech he hoped to recommend himself for the vacant position of secretary of the Deutschen Gesellschaft. The associated salary would have allowed him to support himself as a freelance playwright.

At that time, the members of the society viewed theater mainly as a place for entertainment. Schiller wanted to draw attention to the fact that theater also has an intellectual, moral and emotional effect on visitors.

== Content ==
In his speech, Schiller makes three overarching claims.

- A stage is a moral institution and a school of practical wisdom.
- A stage is a socio-political institution and an instrument of enlightenment.
- A stage is an aesthetic institution.
