= Age of Uprising: The Legend of Michael Kohlhaas =

2013 film directed by Arnaud des Pallières

- Film poster
- Directed by: Arnaud des Pallières
- Written by: Christelle Berthevas; Arnaud des Pallières
- Based on: Michael Kohlhaas by Heinrich von Kleist
- Produced by: Serge Lalou; Martina Haubrich; Gunnar Dedio
- Starring: Mads Mikkelsen
- Cinematography: Jeanne Lapoirie
- Edited by: Sandie Bompar; Arnaud des Pallières
- Music by: Martin Wheeler
- Distributed by: Les Films du Losange (France); Polyband (Germany)
- Release dates: 24 May 2013 (Cannes); 14 August 2013 (France); 12 September 2013 (Germany)
- Running time: 122 minutes
- Countries: France; Germany
- Languages: French, Occitan
- Box office: $1.9 million

Age of Uprising: The Legend of Michael Kohlhaas (French: Michael Kohlhaas) is a 2013 French-German drama film directed by Arnaud des Pallières based on Heinrich von Kleist's novella Michael Kohlhaas, which again is based on the story of Hans Kohlhase. It was nominated for the Palme d'Or at the 2013 Cannes Film Festival.

== Plot ==
During the 16th century, horse dealer Michael Kohlhaas is taking his horses to market. As he passes through a local baron's lands, the baron seizes two of his horses, even though the right to extract tolls has been abolished in the country. When Kohlhaas discovers that his loyal servant was attacked by the baron's guard dogs, and that his horses have been injured and abused, he attempts to sue for monetary compensation, but his lawsuit is dismissed because the baron has a kinsman at court. Then Kohlhaas's wife tries to plead his case to the Princess, but she dies from injuries suffered at the hands of the baron's men.

Kohlhaas leads a revolt to attack the baron's house and then to induce the authorities to administer satisfactory justice. When initially successful, the Princess offers Kohlhaas an amnesty to stop the violence, and he agrees to it, but the deal soon collapses. The baron is sentenced to prison for two years for his offenses, and Kohlhaas is executed.

== Cast ==
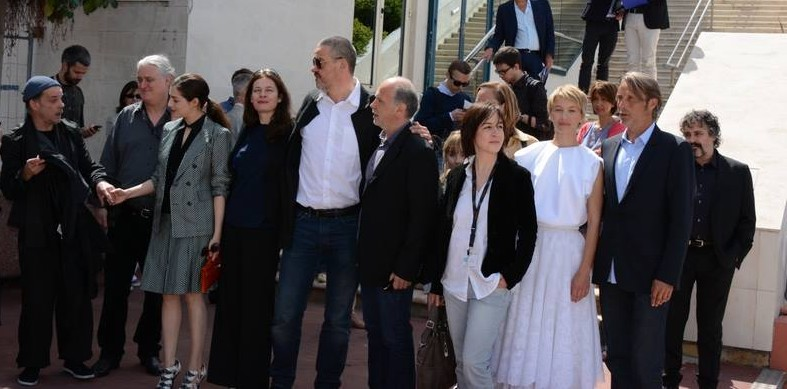
Cast and crew at the 2013 Cannes Film Festival

- Mads Mikkelsen as Michael Kohlhaas
- Delphine Chuillot as Judith
- Bruno Ganz as the governor
- Paul Bartel as Jérémie
- Mélusine Mayance as Lisbeth
- David Bennent as César
- David Kross as the preacher
- Denis Lavant as the theologist
- Sergi López as the one-armed man
- Roxane Duran as Princess Marguerite de Navarre
- Amira Casar as the abbess
- Swann Arlaud as The Baron

== Production ==
Filming took place at the Chartreuse de Pierre-Châtel, a fortified Carthusian monastery located in the commune of Virignin, a few kilometers from Belley, in the Ain department. Filming also took place at the Ferme des Boissets, an ecomuseum dedicated to the Causses and Gorges du Tarn, located in Sainte-Enimie (Lozère).

== Accolades ==
The film won the Golden Iris at the Brussels Film Festival. In January 2014, the film received six nominations at the 39th César Awards, winning in two categories.
