= Hannah Adams =

American author

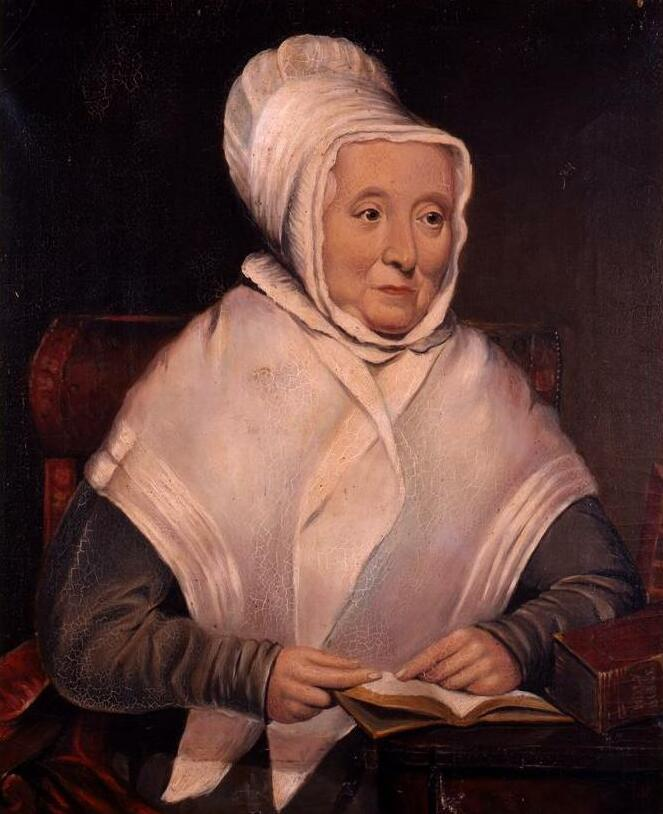
- Portrait of Hannah Adams by Francis Alexander, c. 1828
- Born: October 2, 1755; Medfield, Province of Massachusetts, British America
- Died: December 15, 1831 (aged 76); Brookline, Massachusetts, U.S.
- Resting place: Mount Auburn Cemetery, Cambridge, Massachusetts, U.S.
- Occupation: Author
- Relatives: John Adams, distant cousin
- Writing career
- Language: English
- Subjects: Comparative religion; early United States history
- Notable works: A View of Religions (1784); A Summary History of New-England (1799)

Hannah Adams (October 2, 1755 – December 15, 1831) was an American author of books on comparative religion and early United States history. She was born in Medfield, Massachusetts and died in Brookline. Adams is believed to have been the first woman in the U.S. to work as a professional writer.

She was the second of five children born to Thomas Adams and Elizabeth Clark. Born in "humble obscurity" in a remote country town, in part self-educated, she lived at a time when women in New England were rarely educated. Suffering from ill-health, often poor and obliged to resort to various occupations for her sustenance, she doggedly pursued her studies. Her father, educated at Harvard College, kept a small country store, dealing among other things in books. He also boarded some students of divinity, from whom Adams learned Greek and Latin, which she subsequently taught.

Adams' first work, A View of Religions, was published in 1784, with a second and enlarged edition in 1791. The emolument she derived from this not only placed her in a comfortable situation, but enabled her to pay the debts she had contracted during her and her sister's illness, and lend a small sum at interest. In 1799, she published A Summary History of New-England. In gathering materials for this work, among old manuscripts, she seriously impaired her eyesight and had to employ an amanuensis to prepare the copy for the printers. Her most elaborate work, The History of the Jews since the destruction of Jerusalem, was reprinted in London in 1818 at the expense and for the benefit of the London Society for Promoting Christianity Amongst the Jews. She started an autobiography, which was published after her death by Hannah Farnham Sawyer Lee. During the later years of her life, she enjoyed a comfortable annuity, raised by her friends.

== Early years and education ==
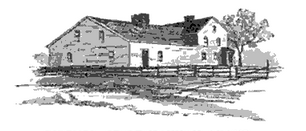
Birthplace of Hannah Adams

Adams belonged to a family which for generations had held important trusts in her native town. Her ancestor, Henry Adams, was one of the founders of the town. Her grandfather was a land proprietor. Having prepared for Harvard College his only son Thomas — Hannah's father — he strongly opposed his leaving him, desiring, as he had a delicate constitution, that he should settle upon his large farm. A student by nature, and not particularly fond of agricultural pursuits, Thomas stayed on the farm and opened a shop for the sale of English books and goods. In 1750, he married Elizabeth Clark, who died when Hannah was 11 years of age, leaving five children. The care of Hannah and a younger sister fell upon the eldest daughter Elizabeth, nicknamed "Betty".

Hannah was an extremely timid child. Being delicate in health, she did not attend the neighborhood school, but, under the care of her father, learned at home, namely, reading, writing and arithmetic. She was enthusiastic over poetry, committing much of the works of her favorite poets, Milton, Thomson, and Young, and others. She did not neglect history or biography, in which she found, as she said, an inexhaustible fund to "feast her mind and gratify her taste." She was fond of novels, the reading of which, in the seclusion of her early years, gave her, she afterwards said, false ideas of life, the "world her imagination made being not what the real world was." Indeed, all her life she felt the lack of thorough training in her youth. By the time she was 20 years of age, few women at that time had read more than she. Her chief delight being in literary pursuits, she eagerly accepted the offer of some gentlemen boarding at her father's house, to teach her Latin, Greek, geography and logic.

A few years after her mother's death, her father failed in business. Although blessed with the help of her sister Elizabeth, Hannah felt the need of adding her share to the family support. She turned to sewing, knitting and spinning, finding the most profit, however, in weaving bobbin lace. However, after the Revolutionary War, when lace was imported, this resource failed, and she was left in a desperate condition. It was at this time that she found financial support in teaching Greek and Latin to three young men living in the vicinity of her home. One of these, Pitt Clarke, was afterwards the pastor of the church at Norton, Massachusetts for over 40 years. In his autobiography published in the "History of Norton," he said, in reference to Adams: "Under her tuition principally I fitted for college, and was admitted into Cambridge University, July, 1786." . Her father had found solace in books through his ill fortunes, and was happiest when making trips to the Harvard College Library. Once, upon entering the building, he exclaimed, "I'd rather be librarian of Harvard College than emperor of all the Russias".

== Career ==
During the American Revolutionary War, she went to work to help support the family by sewing, knitting, spinning, and weaving bobbin lace. From the lacemaking she derived the most profit, and when, after the Revolution, this resource failed, lace then being imported, she had financial difficulties. Soon after, she had the opportunity to tutor three young men of her neighborhood in Latin and Greek; and so well was this work done that one of them afterward said that her tuition principally fitted him for college.

Her writings brought her little money, yet they secured her fame and many friends, first among them the Abbé Grégoire, with whom she carried on an extensive correspondence. The quality of her scholarship also earned her the respect and friendship of several prominent Boston intellectuals, most notably William Smith Shaw and Joseph Stevens Buckminster. These men would soon establish the Anthology Society, precursor to the Boston Athenæum, and become Adams's lifelong allies and patrons, establishing in 1809 a modest annuity that would keep her out of poverty. The sponsorship of these gentlemen aided her in preparing History of the Jews (1812).

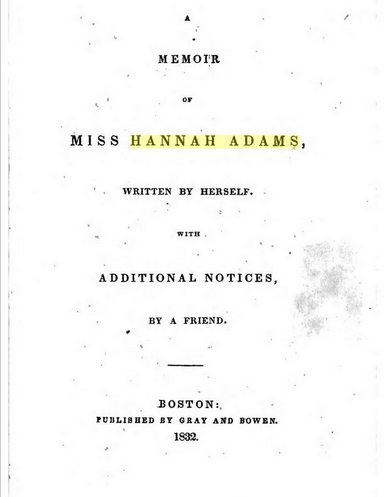

Adams was the first professional author to be a member of the Boston Athenæum, where some of her letters, early editions of her books and her portrait by Chester Harding are kept. Her autobiography, edited with additions by Lee, was published in Boston in 1832.

== Major literary contributions ==
=== A View of Religions ===
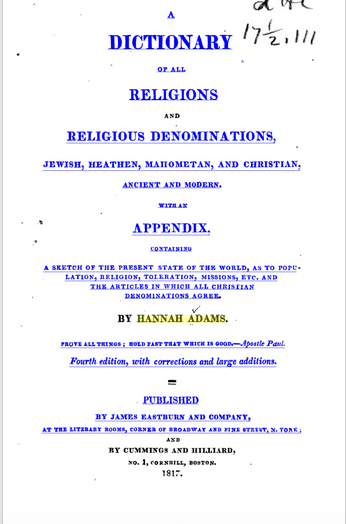

A View of Religions was first published in 1784 with the title An alphabetical compendium of the various sects which have appeared in the world from the beginning of the Christian aera to the present day : With an appendix, containing a brief account of the different schemes of religion now embraced among mankind. : The whole collected from the best authors, ancient and modern. (Boston, printed by B. Edes & Sons, no. 42, Cornhill). The second edition was published in 1791 and titled A View of Religions, while the fourth edition was retitled Dictionary of Religions. A View of Religions was Adams' principle work. In it, she gave a comprehensive survey of the various religions of the world. It was a pioneering work in that she represented denominations from the perspective of their adherents, without imposing her own preferences. A View of Religions was divided into three parts:

1. An Alphabetical Compendium of the Various Sects Which Have Appeared from the Beginning of the Christian Era to the Present Day
2. A Brief Account of Paganism, Mohammedanism, Judaism, and Deism
3. An Account of the Different Religions of the World

Adams's first literary work was the result of her dissatisfaction with the prejudice of most writers on the various religious sects. Her mind had been turned to the subject by reading a manuscript from Broughton's Dictionary giving an account of some of the most common of the sects. A View of Religions was published in 1784, in accordance with the custom of the time, after subscriptions had been obtained to the' proposal' of the work, sufficient in number to warrant its issue. It was fairly profitable, but owing to a bad bargain with the printer, Adams's returns were slight, A second edition with additions, secured by copyright, then newly established by law, was published in 1791, at the instance of influential Boston friends whom the first issue had made for her. This edition was dedicated to John Adams, then Vice-President of the United States, who had headed its list of subscribers, which included such leading names as Samuel Adams, John Hancock, President Joseph Willard of Harvard College, Rt Rev. John Carroll, D.D., the Roman Catholic Bishop of Baltimore, the Rev. Henry Ware, and the Rev. Adoniram Judson. Her father was an enthusiastic seller of the book, traveling about the country on horseback with saddlebags filled with the volumes. A fourth edition of her first work, with further additions, appeared in 1817, under the broader title of A Dictionary of All Religions and Religious Denominations. Jared Sparks gave it his stamp of approval.

=== A Summary History of New-England ===
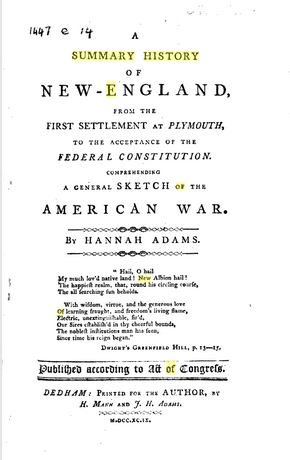

Adams's second work, A Summary History of New-England, was written after an experience in country school-teaching, and was published in 1799. In 1801, a third edition of her first work, further enlarged, was brought out. Next, she prepared a volume of selections from various authors under the title of Truth and Excellence of the Christian Religion, working up her material in the Boston bookshops, since she was unable to purchase or borrow the books she desired to consult. In 1805, there appeared an abridgment of the history of New England, which brought her into conflict with the Rev. Jedidiah Morse, author of the first geography of the U.S., who had published a similar work. A sharp controversy ensued in which the woman's side was championed by several friends, chief among them being Shaw, one of the Anthology Club men.

=== History of the Jews and Letters on the Gospels ===
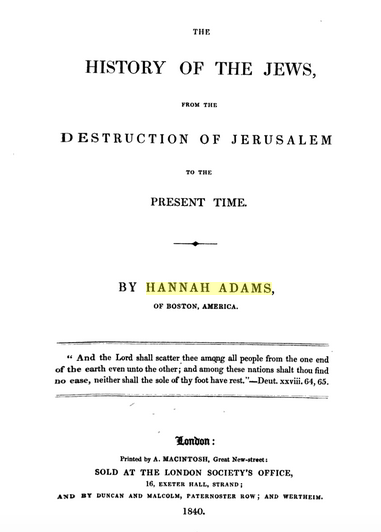

The material for her History of the Jews (1812), was largely gathered in the Boston Athenæum, by permission of Shaw. She also found a friend and helper in Mr. Buckminster, minister, of the Brattle Street Church, another of the Anthology Club group, who gave her the freedom of his study and library. President John Adams, too, gave her the use of his library, then in his home in Quincy. While this history was progressing, she was obliged to work at straw braiding for her support. But at length, through the energy of some Boston women of station, a small annuity was subscribed for her which rendered her closing years comfortable.

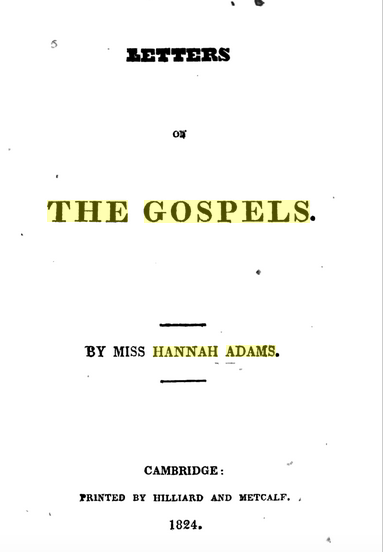

Her last book, Letters on the Gospels, was written when she was 70. She drifted cheerfully into old age. She entertained the friends who gathered in her little parlor with recitations of her poetry which she learned in girlhood.

=== A Memoir of Miss Hannah Adams ===
Mrs. Josiah Quincy III, the wife of Boston's mayor, was the "highly esteemed friend" who requested Adams to write her autobiography. This fragmentary account of her life, —less than 50 pages, — edited by Mrs. Lee the year after her death, was written in the hope that it might become a pecuniary benefit to an aged and infirm sister, who for many years had shared her small earnings. It contains a lithograph of the portrait of Adams, which Chester Harding (painter) painted a few years before her death at the request of Elizabeth Peabody and other friends. The portrait was placed in the Boston Athenaeum, which also contains all of Adams's books.

== Private life ==
Adams was a popular guest in New England society, and once stayed for two weeks at the house of her distant cousin, President John Adams. She described herself as a Unitarian Christian. Shaw and his friends took up a subscription to provide Adams with some financial support and interceded on her behalf in her 1804 conflict with Rev. Jedidiah Morse.

During this visit at Boston, I received the unexpected intelligence, that a number of benevolent gentlemen had settled an annuity upon me, to relieve me from the embarrassments I had hitherto suffered. The Hon. Josiah Quincy, Stephen Higginson, Esq. and William Shaw, Esq. were some of its first promoters. This providential interference excited my most lively gratitude to my generous benefactors, and I hope I sensibly felt my deep obligation to the source of all good.

Lee, the friend who assisted with Adams' memoir, added:

After [Rev. Dr. Joseph Stevens Buckminster] became the Pastor of Brattle Street Church, he, with Mr. Higginson, and Mr. Shaw the active founder of the Athenæum, proposed to Miss Adams, who, from an enfeebled constitution, had begun to grow infirm, to remove to Boston; at the same time procuring for her, through the liberal subscription of a few gentlemen, an annuity for life.

Her birthplace is preserved in Medfield. Her remains were interred at Mount Auburn Cemetery in Cambridge, Massachusetts on November 12, 1832. Her monument "erroneously proclaims" that she was the cemetery's "First Tenant," but she was, in fact, the ninth.

== Selected works ==
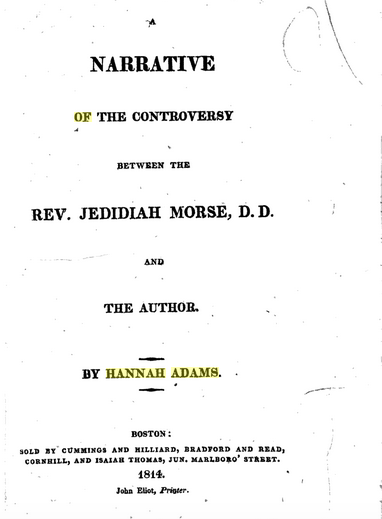

- A View of Religions (1784)
- A Summary History of New England (1799)
- Evidences of Christianity (1801)
- The Truth and Excellence of the Christian Religion (1804)
- An Abridgment of the History of New-England: For the Use of Young Persons: Now Introduced into the Principal Schools in this Town (1807)
- History of the Jews (1812)
- Controversy with Dr. Morse (1814) (This refers to a legal dispute she had with Morse in 1801.)
- A Dictionary of All Religions and Religious Denominations (1817)
- Letters on the Gospels (1824; second edition 1826)
- A Memoir of Miss Hannah Adams (1832; autobiography)
