= A View of Religions =

18th-century survey of world religions by Hannah Adams

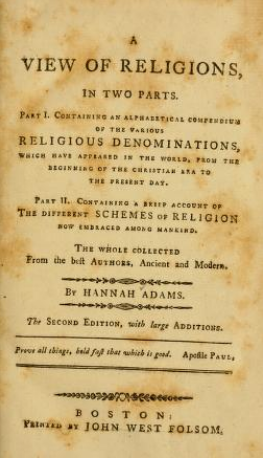
- Frontispiece, second edition (1791)
- Author: Hannah Adams
- Original title: An alphabetical compendium of the various sects which have appeared in the world from the beginning of the Christian aera to the present day : With an appendix, containing a brief account of the different schemes of religion now embraced among mankind. : The whole collected from the best authors, ancient and modern.
- Language: English
- Subject: history of the different sects in religion
- Genre: religion
- Publication date: 1784
- Publication place: United States

A View of Religions is an 18th-century comprehensive survey of world religions by the American author, Hannah Adams. First published in Boston, Massachusetts in 1784, it was a pioneering work in that it represented denominations from the perspective of their adherents, without imposing Adams' own preferences. The book was divided into sections and passed through several editions, which included minor changes in the name of the work. It was reprinted in England. A View of Religions was Adams' first and principal literary work. It was the result of her dissatisfaction with the prejudice of most writers on the various religious sects. She began thinking on the subject after reading a manuscript from Thomas Broughton's Historical Dictionary of all Religions from the Creation of the World to the Present Times (1742).

== Development ==
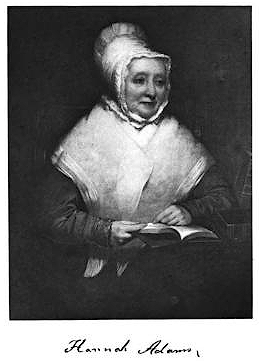
Hannah Adams

Until she was twenty years of age, Adams's reading had been limited mostly to works of imagination and feeling. She had never been directed to those of a controversial nature, nor to a study of the disputed points between the various sects. Her curiosity being awakened by a small manuscript from Broughton's Dictionary, giving an account of some of the most common of the religious denominations, she began to read all she could find on the subject. At about the age of 30, becoming disgusted with the intolerance and lack of candor of the authors, she decided to write in a blank book what seemed to her to be the truth. In doing this she had no idea of publication. The work grew upon her hands and became known to her friends. Needing money, she was urged to publish it. But to find a printer to take it without immediate pay was the difficulty. She obtained 395 subscribers, 28 of whom were women, including Rev. Nathaniel Emmons, Franklin, Massachusetts (six copies), Rev. Charles Chauncy, D. D., Boston, Dr. James Manning, president of Rhode Island College, Edmund Quincy, Esq., Hon. Oliver Wendell, Nathaniel Appleton, Esq., and Samuel Adams, all of Boston. The hard study and close reflection were so difficult, that she was attacked before she finished it by a severe fit of illness, and threatened with derangement.

== 1784 edition ==
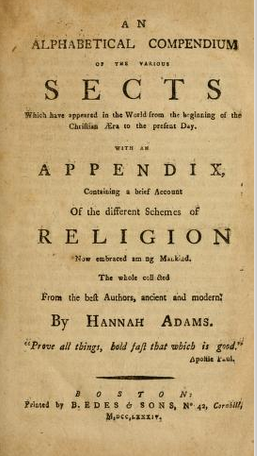
An alphabetical compendium of the various sects (1784)

A bargain having been made with the printer, the book appeared in 1784. Its motto is, "Prove all things, hold fast that which is good." In the Advertisement at the beginning, the author says she intends to "avoid giving the least preference of one denomination above another, to give a few arguments of the principal sects from their own authors as far as possible, to endeavor to represent every sect, and be very careful to enter into the spirit of each author."

The condition of public opinion is seen when Thomas Prentiss, pastor of the Congregational Church in Medfield, Massachusetts, in the Preface, felt obliged to say:—

"The world has been absurdly accustomed to entertain but a moderate opinion of female abilities, and to associate their pretended productions to the craft and policy of designing men; either to excite their admiration or screen their weakness from censure; whereas unbiassed reason must allow, if an invidious comparison between the sexes is in any respect justifiable, it cannot be grounded upon a defect of natural ability, but upon the different and perhaps faulty mode of female education; for under similar culture and with equal advantages, it is far from being certain that the female mind would not admit a measure of improvement that would at least equal, and perhaps in many instances eclipse, the boasted glory of the other Her father, with his other children, was living with a married son, to whom the home and property had been made over. Not wishing to add to the burden of her brother's increasing family expenses, Hannah found this the most trying time of her life, when, as she said, " it was a struggle to live." But though feeble in health, dependent upon herself for support, more or less alone in the world, she found in work her only remedy. She began to prepare additions for the second edition of her book. The task being completed, she applied to some printers for terms of publication. "Though," she says, "I wrote nearly the same letter to all, consisting of a few direct questions, their answers were generally various, prolix and ambiguous." She finally accepted an offer of one hundred dollars in books for an edition of one thousand copies. Going to Boston to attend to the matter, a friend introduced her to the Rev. James Freeman, the newly ordained pastor of King's Chapel. He became interested, transacted the business with the printer, John West Folsom, and helped her obtain some new subscribers. For this generous, personal assistance in a time of need, Adams was most grateful to the end of her life.

== 1791 edition ==
In 1791, appeared under the title of A View of Religions, the second edition of her book first published seven years before. It was enlarged to 410 pages. Part First treated of nearly 300 different religious denominations which had appeared from the beginning of the Christian era; Part Second, of the worship of the Grand Lama, of Mahometans, Jews, Deists and Sceptics, followed by a short review of the religions of the people of the habitable world. A discriminating judgment was noticeable in the work. This second edition was dedicated to John Adams, then Vice President of the United States, a name, she said, "which excites the veneration and gratitude of fellow-citizens, the admiration and esteem of foreign nations."

Of the 400 subscribers to this second edition, 82 of whom were clergymen and 16 women, John Adams headed the list with three copies. Samuel Adams, lieutenant-governor of Massachusetts, followed. Among the new names gained were those of John Hancock, of Boston; Joseph Willard, D. D., president of Harvard College; Right Rev. John Caroll, D. D., Roman Catholic Bishop of Baltimore, Maryland; Hon. William Bradford, governor of Rhode Island; Rev. Henry Ware of Hingham; Christopher Gore, Esq., Boston; Harrison Gray Otis, Boston; Rev. Adoniram Judson, Sr., Malden; Hon. Benjamin Greenleaf, Newburyport; and many others. Mr. Moses Brown, of Providence, took fifteen copies, and seven of the subscribers took six each.

Such distinguished names spoke well of Adams's literary ability. The book was pronounced the best of the kind ever written, possibly the first. From its profits, Adams was enabled to pay the debts her sister's illness had contracted, and to put a small sum at interest. In its sale, her father, who was called by the townspeople "Book Adams," was of much help. On horseback, with his saddle-bag full of the books, often reading a volume, he went from place to place, to sell or to distribute them. Of decided literary tastes himself, he was never happier than when making his frequent visits to the library of Harvard College. Once, upon entering it, he lifted up both hands and exclaimed in great earnestness, "I'd rather be librarian of Harvard College than Emperor of all the Russias!" Who knows but that if Thomas Adams could have followed out his early desires, he might have been librarian of Harvard College? Circumstances obliged him to go into business, and he made a failure of it.

After the publication of the second edition of her book, Adams taught school.

== 1804 edition ==
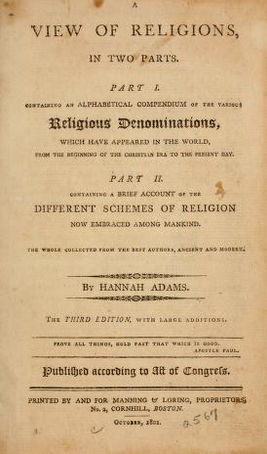
A View of Religions (1801)

Two years after the publication of Adams's History of New England from the first settlement at Plymouth to the acceptance of the Federal Constitution, A view of religions, in two parts : Part I. Containing an alphabetical compedium of the various religious denominations, which have appeared in the world, from the beginning of the Christian era to the present day. Part II. Containing a brief account of the different schemes of religion now embraced among mankind was published, enlarged, and dedicated as before to John Adams. Through the continued kindness of Rev. James Freeman, a bargain was made with the printer whereby she was to receive five hundred dollars in yearly payments, covering a certain period, for the edition of two thousand copies. In 1804 appeared her book of nearly four hundred pages called " Truth and Excellence of the Christian Religion." Her selection of authors and the extracts from their works reveal good judgment and a wide survey of general literature. Not being able to purchase or borrow all the books she needed for this effort, she spent some time in Boston, in order to visit the booksellers' shops. In such places much of the work, as well as the additions to the third edition of her first book, was written. Adams gave this work, with its four hundred subscribers, to the printer for one hundred dollars in books.

== 1805 edition ==
A View of Religions, in three Parts : Part I. Containing an Alphabetical Compendium of the Denominations among Christians. Part II. Containing a brief Account of Paganism, Mahomedism, Judaism, and Deism. Part III. Containing a View of the Religious of the different Nations of the World. By Hannah Adams. A new Edition, with Corrections and Additions. To which is prefixed, An Essay on Truth, by Andrew Fuller. was published in 1805. Griffiths & Griffiths commented:—

The Dictionary appears to be compiled with much fairness; and it contains a long article on the Friends or Quakers, on which peculiar care has been bestowed. To such as are desirous of becoming acquainted with the credenda of this church, the particulars here inserted will be interesting, especially as they are exhibited for the purpose of obviating the representation given by Mr. Evans in his “Sketch of Denominations,” of the similarity of their principles to Sociaianism. The evidence of Barclay is quoted, to prove that the Quakers, while they admit the Scriptures to be of divine authority, do not esteem them “the principal ground of truth, nor the primary rule of faith, but only a secondary rule, subordinate to the spirit.” In the 2d and 3d parts of this work, the reader will meet with curious and amusing accounts of the different religions that now prevail in the several quarters and subdivisions of the globe; and which concludes with stating that the extent of the Christian religion, compared with the parts overspread with Paganism and Mahometanism, is as five to twenty-five.
