= The Jack Bull =

1999 TV film

- DVD cover
- Genre: Western
- Inspired by: Michael Kohlhaas by Heinrich von Kleist
- Written by: Dick Cusack
- Directed by: John Badham
- Starring: John Cusack; John Goodman; L. Q. Jones; Miranda Otto; John C. McGinley
- Music by: Lennie Niehaus
- Country of origin: United States
- Original language: English

Production
- Executive producers: John Cusack; Steve Pink; Thomas J. Mangan IV; John C. McGinley
- Producer: Kevin Reidy
- Cinematography: Gale Tattersall
- Editor: Frank Morriss
- Running time: 116 minutes
- Production companies: HBO Pictures; New Crime Productions; River One Films

Original release
- Network: HBO
- Release: April 17, 1999

The Jack Bull is a 1999 American Western television film directed by John Badham and written by Dick Cusack, loosely inspired by Heinrich von Kleist's 1810 novel Michael Kohlhaas. It stars John Cusack, John Goodman, L. Q. Jones, Miranda Otto, and John C. McGinley, and aired on HBO on April 17, 1999. Much of the movie was filmed at the CL Ranch and the Heritage Park Historical Village in Calgary, Alberta.

== Plot ==
In 1889 Wyoming Territory, Myrl Redding is a horse trader living with his wife Cora, son Cage, and some ranch hands. When Redding attempts to take his horses to a horse market in Casper, he discovers local wealthy landowner, Henry Ballard, has erected a tollbooth on the road to Casper, which goes through Ballard's property. Ballard, who disagrees with Redding regarding making Wyoming a state (which will restrict Ballard's commercial opportunities), charges Redding ten dollars to pass through his land. Unable to pay, Redding leaves two horses as collateral for payment along with a Native American ranch hand, Billy, to ensure the horses are not mistreated.

After selling the horses at Casper, Redding returns to Ballard's ranch to discover that the horses are malnourished and beaten, with Billy nowhere in sight. Redding vows that Ballard will pay to restore the horses' health, while Ballard refuses to pay anything. Redding approaches a local lawyer seeking to sue Ballard, however the lawyer is doubtful the local judge, Judge Wilkins, who is friends with Ballard, will do anything. Redding soon learns that Judge Wilkins has indeed thrown out the lawsuit, prompting his wife to attempt to meet the Attorney General, whose wife she is friends with, escorted by ranch hand Woody. During her visit, some of Ballard's men attack Woody and throw him in front of a horse carriage, which swerves to avoid him and ends up hitting and killing Cora. Redding, furious at the law's failure to do anything about the death of his wife and the loss of his horses, rallies a local militia of ranch owners and farmers and attacks Ballard's home, sending him fleeing.

Ballard manages to plead his case to the Governor of Wyoming, who dispatches a sheriff to arrest Redding. Redding manages to ambush the sheriff's men and in the confusion one of Ballard's men is killed. Seeking to ease the escalating violence, the Governor of Wyoming offers Redding amnesty if he surrenders. Redding accepts but later sends a letter promising to support Billy's tribe against the United States, jeopardizing his amnesty agreement. He is subsequently charged and convicted of murder. Ballard, meanwhile, is brought to Court and ordered to restore the horses' health by a sympathetic judge, Joe B. Tolliver, who also orders Ballard imprisoned for two years. Nonetheless, Judge Tolliver is forced to sentence Redding to be executed following his conviction.

After saying goodbye to his son, Redding is hanged and executed. Wyoming becomes a state, and Cage and Woody take the two healthy horses back to the Redding ranch.

== Cast ==
- John Cusack as Myrl Redding
- John Goodman as Judge Joe B. Tolliver
- L. Q. Jones as Henry Ballard
- Miranda Otto as Cora Redding
- John C. McGinley as Woody
- John Savage as Slater
- Rodney A. Grant as Billy Redwood
- Kurt Fuller as Conrad
- Rex Linn as Shelby Dykes
- Jay O. Sanders as Attorney General Metcalfe
- Drake Bell as Cage Redding
- Ken Pogue as Judge Wilkins
- Glenn Morshower as Colonel Jeffries
- Scott Wilson as The Governor
- Dick Cusack as Jury Foreman

== Soundtrack ==
- Music by Lennie Niehaus
- "Ring Them Bells" – Bob Dylan
