= Arnaud des Pallières =

French film director

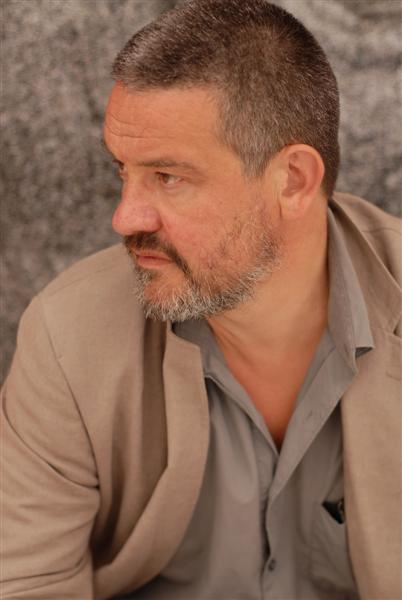
- Arnaud des Pallières in 2008
- Born: 1 December 1961 (age 64); Paris, France
- Occupations: Director; Screenwriter
- Years active: 1991–present

Arnaud des Pallières (born 1 December 1961) is a French film director and screenwriter. His film Age of Uprising: The Legend of Michael Kohlhaas was screened in the main competition section at the 2013 Cannes Film Festival.

== Political views ==
In December 2023, alongside 50 other filmmakers, Arnaud des Pallières signed an open letter published in Libération demanding a ceasefire and an end to the killing of civilians amid the 2023 Israeli invasion of the Gaza Strip, and for a humanitarian corridor into Gaza to be established for humanitarian aid, and the release of hostages.

== Filmography ==
Year	Title	Role	Notes
1991	Le jardin du bonheur	Director & writer	Short
1991	Naissance d'un hôpital	Writer	Documentary directed by Jean-Louis Comolli
1997	Drancy Avenir	Director, writer & Editor	
2000	Soins et beauté	Writer	Short directed by Alejandra Rojo
2000	Un siècle d'écrivains	Director, writer & Editor	TV series (1 episode)
2002	Disneyland, mon vieux pays natal	Director, writer, Editor & Cinematographer	Documentary
2003	Adieu	Director, writer & Editor	
2003	La chose publique	Actor	TV movie directed by Mathieu Amalric
2008	Parc	Director, writer, Editor & Sound Editor	Nominated - Stockholm International Film Festival - Bronze Horse
2010	Diane Wellington	Director, writer & Editor	Short; Clermont-Ferrand International Short Film Festival - Special Mention of the Jury; Clermont-Ferrand International Short Film Festival - Special Mention of the Youth Jury; IndieLisboa International Independent Film Festival - Onda Curta Award; IndieLisboa International Independent Film Festival - Special Mention
2011	Poussières d'Amérique	Director & Editor	Documentary
2013	Age of Uprising: The Legend of Michael Kohlhaas	Director, writer & Editor	Brussels Film Festival - Golden Iris; Film by the Sea International Film Festival - La Grenouille; Nominated - Cannes Film Festival - Palme d'Or; Nominated - Hawaii International Film Festival - Best Film
2017	Orpheline	Director, writer & Editor	Nominated - San Sebastián International Film Festival - Best Film
2022	Journal d'Amérique	Director & Editor	Documentary
