= Heinrich von Kleist =

German Romantic writer (1777–1811)

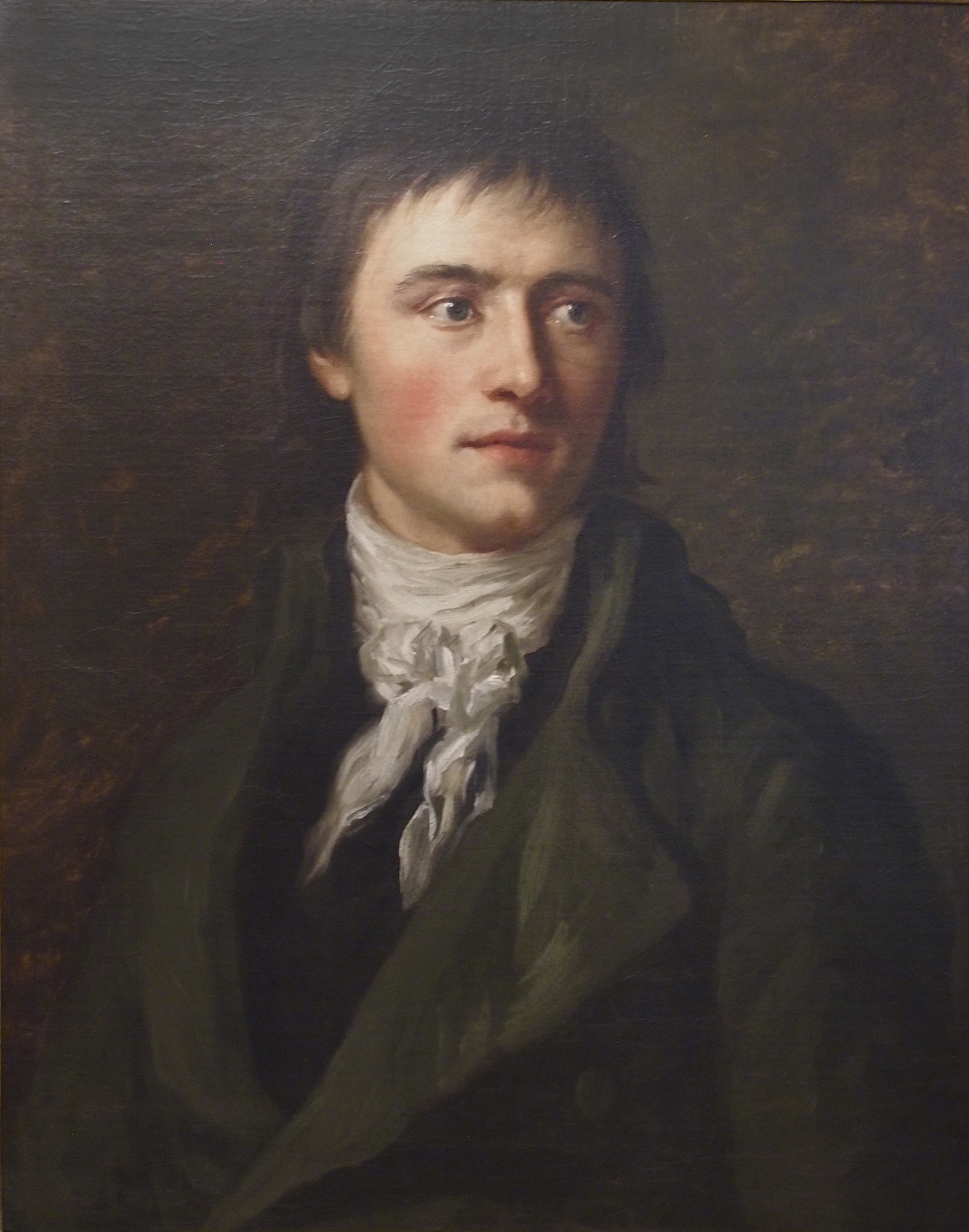
- Heinrich von Kleist, a portrait by Anton Graff, c. 1808
- Born: Bernd Heinrich Wilhelm von Kleist; 18 October 1777; Frankfurt an der Oder, Kingdom of Prussia, Holy Roman Empire
- Died: 21 November 1811 (aged 34); Kleiner Wannsee, Berlin, Kingdom of Prussia
- Occupations: Poet, dramatist, novelist, short story writer
- Writing career
- Notable works: The Broken Jug, The Marquise of O, Michael Kohlhaas, Penthesilea, The Prince of Homburg
- Movement: Romanticism

Bernd Heinrich Wilhelm von Kleist (German: [ˈhaɪnʁɪç fɔn ˈklaɪst]; 18 October 1777 – 21 November 1811) was a German poet, dramatist, novelist, short story writer and journalist. His best known works are the theatre plays The Prince of Homburg, Das Käthchen von Heilbronn, The Broken Jug, Amphitryon, and Penthesilea, and the novellas Michael Kohlhaas and The Marquise of O. Kleist ended his life in a suicide pact by shooting himself together with a close female friend who was terminally ill.

The Kleist Prize, a prestigious prize for German literature, is named after him, as is the Kleist Theater in his birthplace Frankfurt an der Oder.

== Life ==
Kleist was born into the von Kleist family in Frankfurt an der Oder in the Margraviate of Brandenburg, a province of the Kingdom of Prussia. After a scanty education, he entered the Prussian Army in 1792, served in the Rhine campaign of 1796, and retired from the service in 1799 with the rank of lieutenant. He studied law, philosophy, natural sciences and Latin at the Viadrina University, and in 1800, he obtained a subordinate post in the Ministry of Finance at Berlin.

In the following year, Kleist's roving restless spirit got the better of him, and procuring a lengthened leave of absence, he visited Paris, then settled in Switzerland. There, he found congenial friends in Heinrich Zschokke and Ludwig Wieland (1777–1819), son of the poet Christoph Martin Wieland; and to them, he read his first drama, a gloomy tragedy, The Schroffenstein Family (1803).

In the autumn of 1802, Kleist returned to Germany; he visited Goethe, Schiller, and Wieland in Weimar, stayed for a while in Leipzig and Dresden, returned to Paris. Returning in 1804 to his post in Berlin, he transferred to the Domänenkammer (department for the administration of crown lands) at Königsberg. On a journey to Dresden in 1807, Kleist was arrested by the French as a spy; he remained a close prisoner of France in the Fort de Joux. On regaining his liberty, he proceeded to Dresden, where, in conjunction with Adam Heinrich Müller (1779–1829), he published the journal Phöbus in 1808.

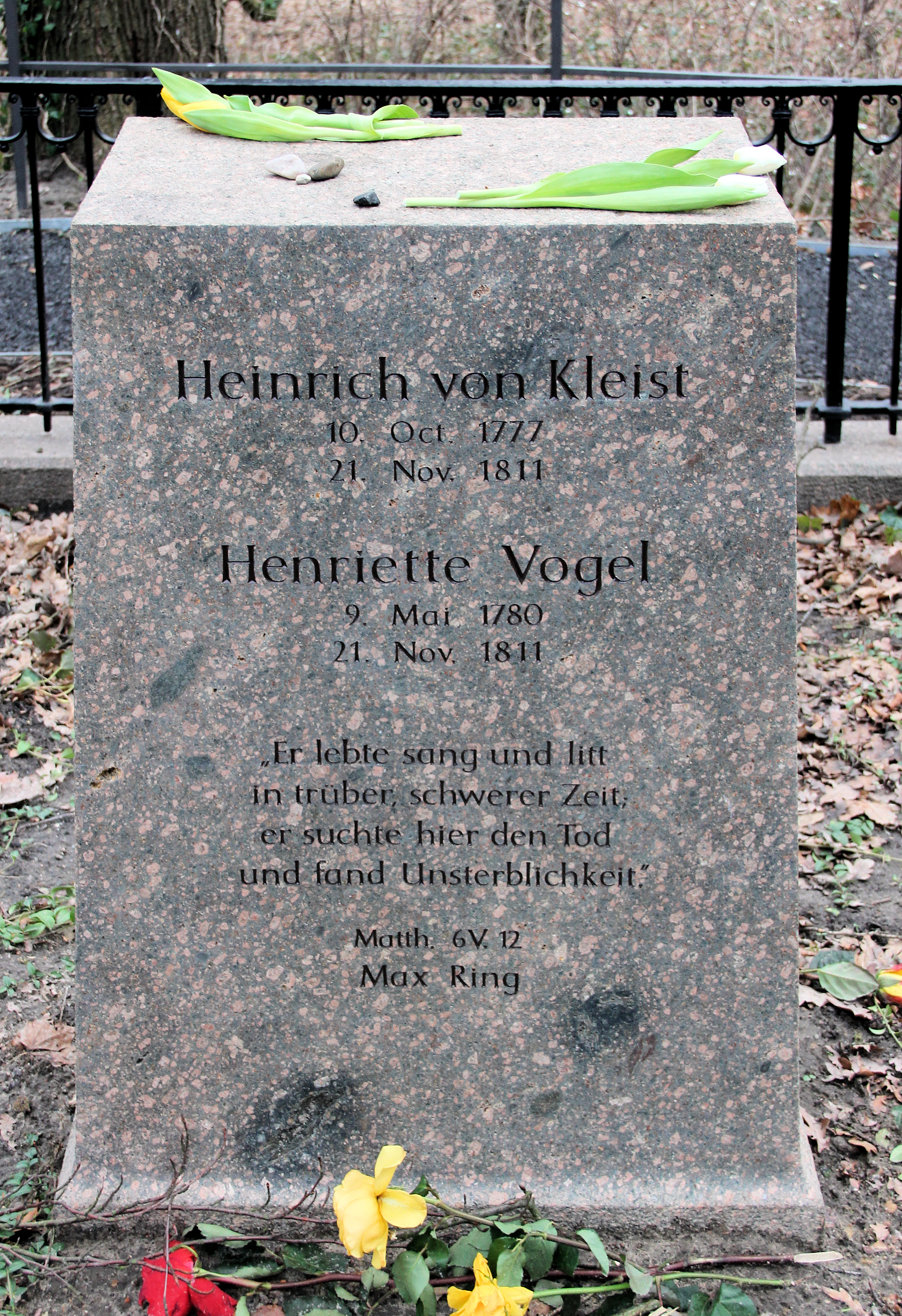
Grave of Kleist and Henriette Vogel at Berlin Kleiner Wannsee after renovation in 2011

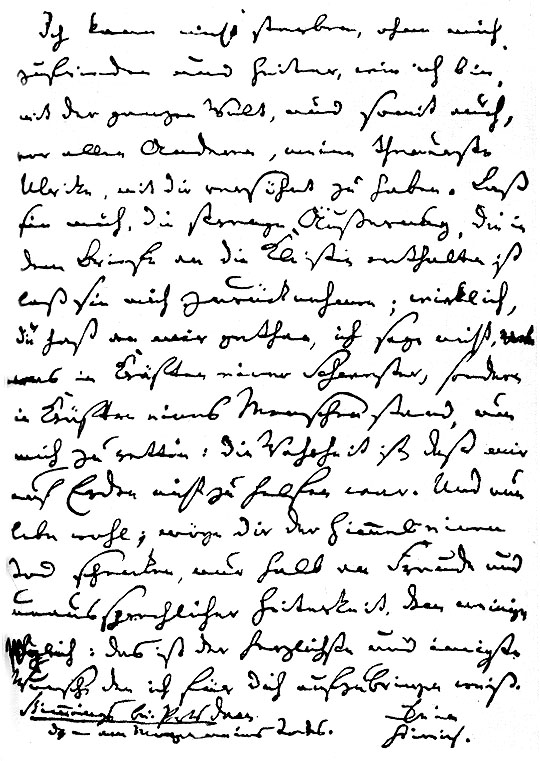
Suicide letter addressed to his half-sister Ulrike

In 1809, Kleist went to Prague, and ultimately settled in Berlin. He edited (1810/1811) the Berliner Abendblätter. Captivated by the intellectual and musical accomplishments of the terminally-ill Henriette Vogel^{(de)}, Kleist, more disheartened and embittered than ever, agreed to do her bidding and die with her, carrying out this resolution by shooting first Vogel and then himself on the shore of the Kleiner Wannsee (Little Wannsee) near Potsdam on 21 November 1811.

According to the Encyclopædia Britannica Eleventh Edition, "Kleist's whole life was filled by a restless striving after ideal and illusory happiness, and this is reflected in his work. He was by far the most important North German dramatist of the Romantic movement, and no other of the Romanticists approaches him in the energy with which he expresses patriotic indignation."

=== Relationship with Henriette Vogel and suicide pact ===
Kleist met Henriette Vogel in 1809 through his friend Adam Müller; a friendship flourished. They shared a fondness for music, and according to Ernest Peguilhen, Henriette Vogel asked her friend to explain to her the art of war, as well as to teach her fencing, for the dramatist was a soldier. The relationship between the two became intimate in the autumn of 1811. According to their contemporaries, there was no fire of passion but a purely spiritual love. His cousin Marie von Kleist, the most important sponsor and confidant of Heinrich von Kleist, also made sure these rumors spread. According to the autopsy report, Vogel was suffering from cancer.

On 21 November 1811 the two traveled from Berlin to Wannsee. Prior to their departure, they penned farewell letters, along with an account of the final night they spent at the inn Gasthof Stimming. Upon their arrival in the vicinity of the Wannsee in Potsdam, Kleist shot Henriette, then turned the gun on himself. They were buried together in a common grave at Kleine Wannsee (Bismarckstrasse), which became a tourist attraction. It was re-designed prior to the bi-centenary of their deaths. On that occasion, direct access from Wannsee station to the grave was built. The gravestone, erected in 1936, was rotated, and shows engraved original text written by Max Ring and the Pater Noster's request: "forgive us our guilt" as well as the names and data of Henriette Vogel and Heinrich von Kleist.

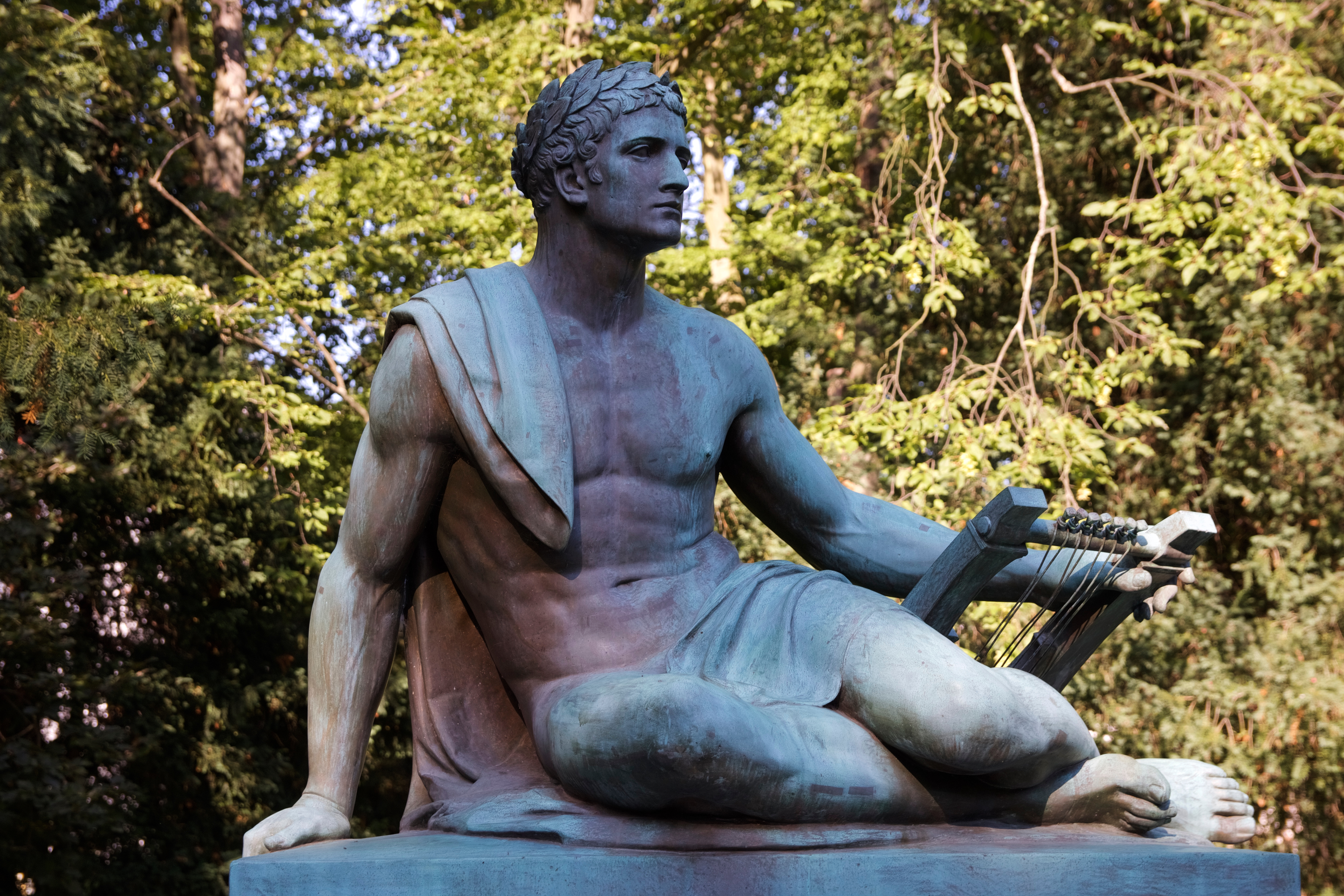
Kleist Monument in Frankfurt (Oder)

== Literary works ==
His first tragedy was The Schroffenstein Family (Die Familie Schroffenstein). The material for the second, Penthesilea (1808), queen of the Amazons, is taken from a Greek source and presents a picture of wild passion. More successful than either of these was his romantic play, Käthchen of Heilbronn (Das Käthchen von Heilbronn) (1808), a poetic drama full of medieval bustle and mystery, which retained its popularity for many years.

In comedy, Kleist made a name with The Broken Jug (Der zerbrochne Krug) (1808), while Amphitryon (1808), an adaptation of Molière's comedy, received critical acclaim long after his death. Of Kleist's other dramas, Die Hermannsschlacht (1809) is a dramatic work of anti-Napoleonic propaganda, written as Austria and France went to war. It has been described by Carl Schmitt as the "greatest partisan work of all time". In it he gives vent to his hatred of his country's oppressors. This, together with the drama The Prince of Homburg (Prinz Friedrich von Homburg oder die Schlacht bei Fehrbellin), which is among his best works, was first published by Ludwig Tieck in Kleist's Hinterlassene Schriften (1821). Robert Guiskard, a drama conceived on a grand plan, was left a fragment.

Kleist was also a master in the art of narrative, and of his Gesammelte Erzählungen (Collected Stories) (1810–1811), Michael Kohlhaas, in which the famous Brandenburg horse dealer in Martin Luther's day is immortalized, is one of the best German stories of its time. The Earthquake in Chile (Das Erdbeben in Chili) and St. Cecilia, or the Power of Music (Die heilige Cäcilie oder die Gewalt der Musik) are also fine examples of Kleist's story telling as is The Marquise of O (Die Marquise von O). His short narratives influenced those of Kafka and the novellas of the Austrian writer Friedrich Halm. He also wrote patriotic lyrics in the context of the Napoleonic Wars.

=== Work in rhetoric ===
Kleist's work also delved into the realm of rhetoric. Most notable for his use of error and understanding its importance, Kleist's devices used were misspeaking, misunderstanding, mistaken identities, and other confusions of the sort. In his works one can see the most prevalent use of rhetoric within Penthesilea. In the story moments of violence, seduction and war all hinge upon errors in language. Through these errors, Kleist shows how error can influence everyday situations and can be the causation of serious problems. As a sum, Kleist's use of error explores what one can make of ironic errors within speech.

== Philosophical essays ==
Kleist is also famous for his essays on subjects of aesthetics and psychology that, upon close examination, reveal a keen insight into the metaphysical questions discussed by philosophers of his time, such as Kant, Fichte and Schelling.

=== On the Gradual Production of Thoughts Whilst Speaking ===
In the first of his larger essays, On the Gradual Production of Thoughts Whilst Speaking (Über die allmähliche Verfertigung der Gedanken beim Reden), Kleist claims that most people are advised to speak only about what they already understand. Instead of talking about what you already know, Kleist admonishes his readers to speak to others with "the sensible intention of instructing yourself." Fostering a dialogue through the art of "skillful questioning" can play a role in achieving a rational or enlightened state of mind, but need not ("Nor is it that her skillful questioning leads me on to the point which matters, though this may frequently be the case" (von Kleist, p. 405)). And yet, Kleist employs the example of the French Revolution as the climactic event of the Enlightenment era whereby man broke free from his dark and feudal chains in favor of liberty, equality, fraternity. It is not that easy though for Kleist. Man cannot simply guide himself into the future with a rational mind as his primary tool. Therefore, Kleist strongly advocates for the usefulness of reflection ex post facto or after the fact. In doing so, man will be able to mold his collective consciousness in a manner conducive to the principles of free will. By reflecting after the fact, man will avoid the seemingly detestable inhibitions offered in rational thought. In other words, the will to power has "its splendid source in the feelings," and thus, man must overcome his "struggle with Fate" with a balanced mixture of wisdom and passion.

== Bibliography ==
His Gesammelte Schriften were published by Ludwig Tieck (3 vols. 1826) and by Julian Schmidt (new ed. 1874); also by Franz Muncker (4 vols. 1882); by Theophil Zolling (4 vols. 1885); by K. Siegen, (4 vols. 1895); and in a critical edition by Erich Schmidt (5 vols. 1904–1905). His Ausgewählte Dramen were published by K. Siegen (Leipzig, 1877); and his letters were first published by Eduard von Bülow, Heinrich von Kleists Leben und Briefe (1848).

Plays

- Die Familie Schroffenstein, written 1802, published anonymously in 1803, premiered 9 January 1804 in Graz
- Robert Guiskard, Herzog der Normänner, written 1802–1803, published April/May 1808 in Phöbus, first performed on 6 April 1901 at the Berliner Theater in Berlin
- Der zerbrochne Krug (The Broken Jug), written 1803–1806, premiered 2 March 1808 at the Hoftheater in Weimar
- Amphitryon, written 1807, first performed on 8 April 1899 at the Neuen Theater in Berlin
- Penthesilea, completed 1807, published 1808, first performed in May 1876 at the Königlichen Schauspielhaus in Berlin
- Das Käthchen von Heilbronn oder Die Feuerprobe. Ein großes historisches Ritterschauspiel, written 1807–1808, partially published in Phöbus 1808, premiered 17 March 1810 at the Theater an der Wien in Vienna, revised and fully published in 1810
- Die Hermannsschlacht, written 1809, posthumously published 1821, first performed on 18 October 1860 in Breslau
- Prinz Friedrich von Homburg (The Prince of Homburg), written 1809–1811, first performed on 3 October 1821 as Die Schlacht von Fehrbellin at the Burgtheater in Vienna

Novellas and short stories

- Das Erdbeben in Chili (The Earthquake in Chile), published under the original title Jeronimo und Josephe 1807 in Cottas Morgenblatt für gebildete Stände; revised and included in 1810 in Erzählungen (Volume 1)
- Die Marquise von O...., published February 1808 in Phöbus; revised and included in 1810 in Erzählungen (Volume 1)
- Michael Kohlhaas. Aus einer alten Chronik, partially published June 1808 in Phöbus; included in 1810 in Erzählungen (Volume 1)
- Das Bettelweib von Locarno (The Beggarwoman of Locarno), published 11 October 1810 in the Berliner Abendblättern; included in 1811 in Erzählungen (Volume 2)
- Die heilige Cäcilie oder die Gewalt der Musik. Eine Legende (St. Cecilia or The Power of Music), published 15–17 November 1810 in the Berliner Abendblättern; expanded and included in 1811 in Erzählungen (Volume 2)
- Die Verlobung in St. Domingo (The Betrothal in Santo Domingo), published 25 March to 5 April 1811 in Der Freimüthige; revised and included in 1811 in Erzählungen (Volume 2)
- Der Findling (The Foundling), published in 1811 in Erzählungen (Volume 2)
- Der Zweikampf (The Duel), published 1811 in Erzählungen (Volume 2)
- Anekdoten, published 1810–1811 in the Berliner Abendblättern
  - Anecdotes. Translated by Matthew Spencer. Seattle: Sublunary Editions. 2021.

== Legacy and adaptations ==
=== Adaptations ===
==== Operas ====
- Der Prinz von Homburg (1960), composed by Hans Werner Henze
- Der zerbrochne Krug (1968/69), composed by Fritz Geißler
- Penthesilea (1927), composed by Othmar Schoeck
- Penthesilea (2015), composed by Pascal Dusapin

==== Films ====
- Michael Kohlhaas – der Rebell (1969), directed by Volker Schlöndorff
- San Domingo (1970), directed by Hans-Jürgen Syberberg
- Earthquake in Chile (1975), directed by Helma Sanders-Brahms
- The Marquise of O (1976), directed by Éric Rohmer based on Kleist's Die Marquise von O
- Ragtime (1981), directed by Miloš Forman and based on a novel of the same title by E. L. Doctorow; contains a subplot which follows closely the story of Michael Kohlhaas
- Heinrich Penthesilea von Kleist (1983), directed by Hans Neuenfels; intercuts rehearsals and discussions of that play
- Die Familie oder Schroffenstein (1984), directed by Hans Neuenfels
- Il principe di Homburg (1997), an Italian adaptation of Prinz Friedrich von Homburg oder die Schlacht bei Fehrbellin directed by Marco Bellocchio
- The Jack Bull (1999), directed by John Badham; loosely based on Kleist's Michael Kohlhaas
- Il seme della discordia (2008), directed by Pappi Corsicato; a modern Italian adaptation of Kleist's Die Marquise von O
- Kohlhaas oder die Verhältnismäßigkeit der Mittel (2012), a German film directed by Aron Lehmann; loosely based on Kleist's Michael Kohlhaas.
- Age of Uprising: The Legend of Michael Kohlhaas (2014), directed by Arnaud des Pallières; with Mads Mikkelsen as Kohlhaas

=== Kleist in media ===
- Biographical film
  - Wie zwei fröhliche Luftschiffer (Like Two Merry Aeronauts, 1969), 85 min; written and directed by Jonatan Briel; DFFB Production. The biographical film depicts the last three days of Kleist's life. With his lover, Henriette Vogel, dying of cancer, Kleist philosophizes about life and welcomes his planned suicide.
  - Heinrich (1977), directed by Helma Sanders-Brahms; about the author
  - Amour Fou (2014), directed by Jessica Hausner, nominated in the Un Certain Regard category at the Cannes Film Festival 2014, with Christian Friedel playing Heinrich and Birte Schnoeink playing Henriette. The film purports that Henriette does not in fact suffer from any type of tumour but that her symptoms have psychological causes.
- Literature
  - Kleist in Thun (1913), a short story by Robert Walser that fictionalizes Kleist's stay in Thun in 1802.
