= Current History =

- Discipline: World affairs
- Language: English
- Edited by: Lindsay Shingler

Publication details
- Former names: New York Times Current History of the European War; Current History & Forum
- History: 1914–present
- Publisher: University of California Press (United States)
- Frequency: 9/year (2026) 6/year (2027)
- Impact factor: 3.5 (2025)

Standard abbreviations
- ISO 4: Curr. Hist.

Indexing
- ISSN: 0011-3530
- OCLC no.: 875826836

Links
- Journal homepage

Current History is the oldest extant United States–based publication devoted exclusively to contemporary world affairs. The magazine was founded in 1914 by George Washington Ochs Oakes, brother of The New York Times' publisher Adolph Ochs, in order to provide detailed coverage of World War I. Current History was published by the New York Times Company from its founding until 1936. It was owned and published by members of the Redmond family from 1946 until 2020 with Daniel Mark Redmond serving as the last Redmond family member to serve as publisher..The journal has been published by University of California Press since September 2020.

For many years Current History was published monthly, from September through May. Seven issues each year were devoted to world regions (China and East Asia, Russia and Eurasia, the Middle East, Latin America, Europe, South Asia, and Africa); one issue coveredcurrent global trends; and one issue addressed a special theme such as climate change or global governance. The magazine followed this practice of devoting each issue to a single region or theme since 1953. Beginning in July 2026 the journal ended the organization of issues by region and began publishing just thematic issues. Beginning in 2027 the journal will publish 6 expanded issues per year instead of nine shorter issues per year.

According to the Journal Citation Reports, the journal has a 2025 impact factor of 3.5, ranking it 45th out of 332 journals in the category "Political Science" and 18th out of 173 journals in the category "International Relations".

== History ==
The first of the journal, which was initially called The New York Times Current History of the European War, was published on December 12, 1914.

Shortly after Current History began publishing in 1914, its editor, Ochs Oakes, decided that a magazine recording “history in the making” should maintain as regular contributors a group of historians and social scientists. He enlisted the help of a Harvard historian, Albert Bushnell Hart, in organizing the journal’s initial group of contributing editors.

Contributors to Current History in the publication's early years included George Bernard Shaw, Winston Churchill, Charles A. Beard, Allan Nevins, and Henry Steele Commager. Grover Clark was its Beijing correspondent. More recently, the journal has featured authors such as James Schlesinger, Francis Fukuyama, Jeffrey Sachs, Bruce Riedel, Leslie H. Gelb, Bruce Russett, Elizabeth Economy, Charles Kupchan, Ivo Daalder, Joseph Cirincione, Phebe Marr, Juan Cole, Bruce Gilley, and Marina Ottaway.

The magazine was linked to an international scandal in the run-up to World War II. The New York Times had sold Current History in 1936 to the editor Merle Tracy; in 1939 it was sold again, to an ownership group that included Joseph Hilton Smyth, who also acquired such magazines as The Living Age and The North American Review. Smyth's association with Current History ended the same year, but he and two associates, in connection with their publishing activities, were later convicted of acting as agents for the Japanese government without registering with the State Department. Current History addressed this episode in its October 1942 issue, maintaining that Smyth during the months that he held an ownership interest in the publication did not control editorial policies."

== Editorial team ==
The publication's editor is Lindsay Shingler. The journal is owned by the Regents of the University of California and published by University of California Press in collaboration with the UC Institute on Global Conflict and Cooperation.
