= William Smith Shaw =

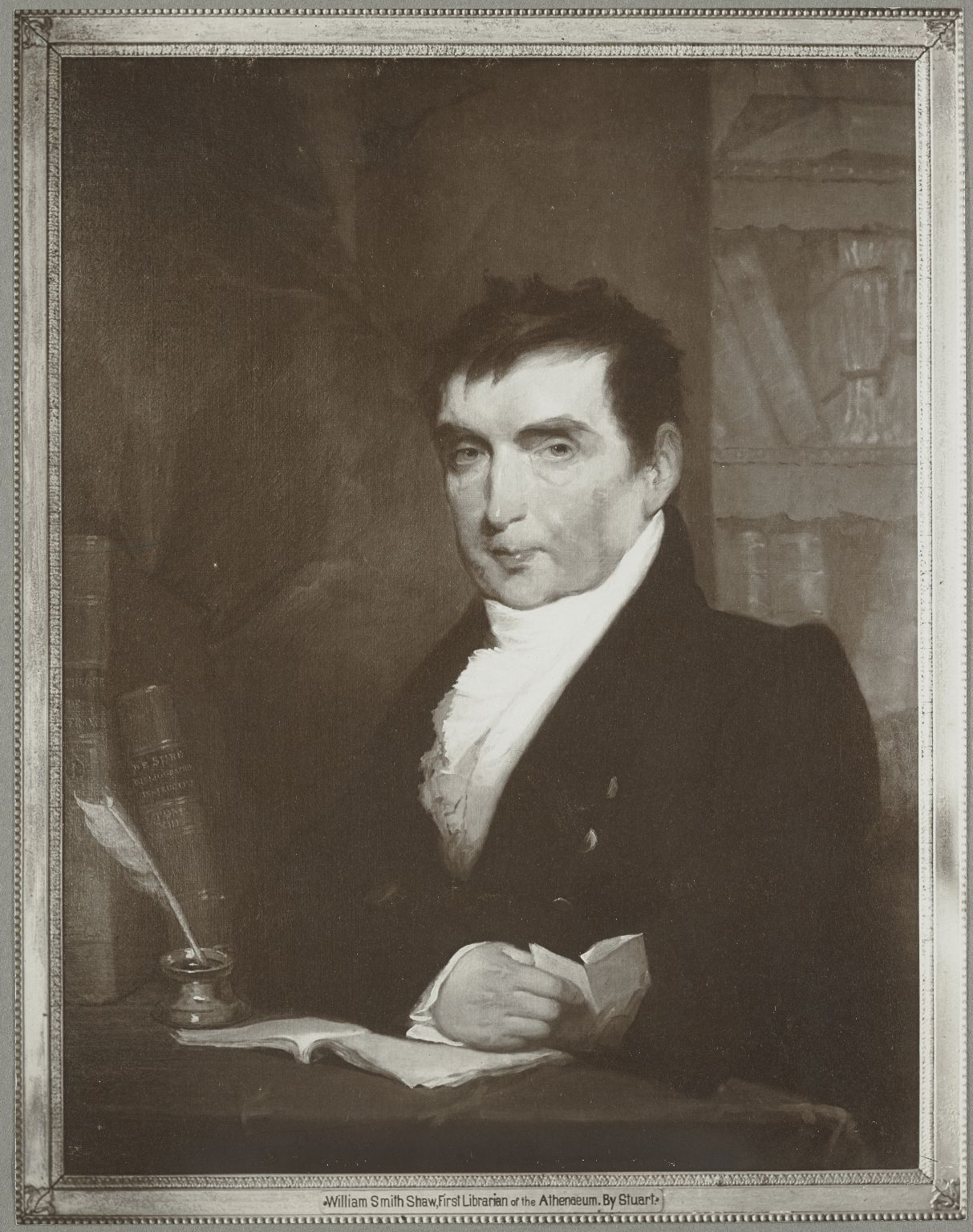
- Portrait by Gilbert Stuart, 1824

Private Secretary to the President
- In office March 4, 1797 – March 4, 1801
- President: John Adams
- Preceded by: Tobias Lear
- Succeeded by: Meriwether Lewis

Personal details
- Born: August 12, 1778; Haverhill, Massachusetts, U.S.
- Died: April 25, 1826 (aged 47); Boston, Massachusetts, U.S.
- Education: Harvard University

William Smith Shaw (August 12, 1778 – April 25, 1826) was an American librarian. He was a founder of the Boston Athenæum as well as the Athenæum's first librarian.

== Biography ==
William Smith Shaw was born to John and Elizabeth Shaw in Haverhill, Massachusetts, on August 12, 1778. He had two siblings, Elizabeth (1780–1798) and Abigail (1790–1859). "He very early discovered a strong attachment for books. Able to read before he could distinctly articulate the name of them, nothing afforded him greater pleasure, than some little volume, suited to his comprehension." Shaw matriculated in Harvard College in July 1794 and graduated with the Class of 1798. Immediately after his graduation he moved to Philadelphia to become private secretary to his uncle, President John Adams. He returned to Boston after Adams' defeat by Thomas Jefferson and in April 1801 began the study of law in the offices of William Sullivan. He was admitted an attorney at the Court of Common Pleas in Suffolk County in April 1804 and in the spring of 1806 became a Clerk of the District Court of Massachusetts.

Shaw was a founder of The Anthology Society, a literary club formed in October 1805 to take responsibility for the publication a Boston literary gazette, the Monthly Anthology and Boston Review, of which Shaw became the fourth editor. At the October 23, 1805, meeting of the society "'it was voted, on motion of Mr. Emerson, seconded by Mr. Shaw, that a Library of periodical publications be instituted for the use of the Society.' ... Thus commenced the nucleus of the Boston Athenæum." He was elected a Fellow of the American Academy of Arts and Sciences in 1810.

Shaw's contributions to Boston libraries were by no means limited to the Boston Athenæum. He was an active member and occasional officer in the Massachusetts Historical Society, the Redwood Library, the Agricultural Society, and the Linneæan Society of New England. Shaw never married despite encouragement from his mother. "You will need a friend, to sympathize with you in the trials of your temporal course and rejoice with you in your happiness. Whenever your income allows, make no delay. Your lot has fallen among some of the loveliest of women. You must have imbibed a high idea of female excellence. Be circumspect. Let economy, industry, amiableness, intelligence and virtue, be among the higher requisites, while beauty and fortune are but secondary objects." In his will Shaw bequeathed his considerable collection of newspapers, coins, pamphlets and books to the Boston Athenæum which also houses his archives.

== Newspapers, Tracts and Pamphlets ==
Shaw's prodigious literary scrounging is the primary reason that the Boston Athenæum has in its collection over 7,000 linear feet of newspapers, tracts and pamphlets. Shaw was not incognizant of his habit. Charles Knowles Bolton, the seventh librarian at the Boston Athenæum, in his history of that institution passes along the following telling anecdote:

The Essex Institute has recently presented to the Library [of the Boston Athenæum] a legal essay written by Judge William Tudor, on the back of which, in the handwriting of the first librarian, William S. Shaw, I find an amusing statement never before printed, part of which reads as follows: 'Judge Tudor wrote these observations and presented them to me. Gentlemen, said he, that dog Shaw goes everywhere. He knows everybody. Everybody knows him. If he sees a book, pamphlet, or manuscript –– Oh! Sir! the Athenæum must have this. Well, have it he will and have it he must, and have it he does, for he seldom goes out of a house without having something under his arm; and his large pockets, made on purpose, are crammed. Now, he never refuses anything whatever. With him a book is a book, pamphlet a pamphlet, a manuscript a manuscript, etc., etc. If I had given it to any of you gentlemen, you would have put it into your pockets, and some days after you would have accidentally have found something there, all in atoms, about which you knew nothing. Now, that Shaw will preserve them like the apple of his eye, and after my death he will perhaps publish them and give me that reputation after death which I never had during this life.'

Fellow Anthology Club member and Athenæum founder, Robert Hallowell Gardiner, says that Shaw became "a sturdy beggar for the Athenæum, applying for donations of books or pamphlets wherever there was the least prospect of obtaining them, and was very successful." Shaw's attention to collecting for the Athenæum earned him the soubriquet of Athenæum Shaw.

== Hannah Adams ==
Shaw along together with some of his professional and literary friends famously interceded on behalf American historian, Hannah Adams, in her 1804 conflict with Rev. Jedidiah Morse regarding the use of Adams' book A Summary History of New England in Boston schools. Previous to this legal dust-up, Shaw and his friends had taken up a subscription to provide Adams with some financial support. Adams writes:

During this visit at Boston, I received the unexpected intelligence, that a number of benevolent gentlemen had settled an annuity upon me, to relieve me from the embarrassments I had hitherto suffered. The Hon. Josiah Quincy, Stephen Higginson, Esq. and William Shaw, Esq. were some of its first promoters. This providential interference excited my most lively gratitude to my generous benefactors, and I hope I sensibly felt my deep obligation to the source of all good.

Mrs. Hannah F. Lee, the friend who wrote the additional notices in Adams' memoir, adds: "After [Rev. Dr. Joseph Stevens Buckminster] became the Pastor of Brattle Street Church, he, with Mr. Higginson, and Mr. Shaw the active founder of the Athenæum, proposed to Miss Adams, who, from an enfeebled constitution, had begun to grow infirm, to remove to Boston; at the same time procuring for her, through the liberal subscription of a few gentlemen, an annuity for life."

In addition to fending off Jedidiah Morse and contributing to her annuity, Shaw also arranged for Hannah Adams to use the library at the Boston Athenæum for her research.

== The Nail Factory ==
In addition to his storied literary pursuits, William Smith Shaw was throughout his professional life a practicing attorney with considerable business interests. His archives at the Boston Athenæum document stock holdings a number of local manufacturing enterprises including the Boston Mill Corporation, the Dedham Manufacturing Company, and the Linen and Duck Manufacturing Company.

Shaw's archives also document that on May 16, 1814, Shaw entered into a partnership with the above-mentioned Robert Hallowell Gardiner to found the Gardiner Nail Manufacturing Company to be located in the Town of Gardiner. The partnership was "to continue and be in force for during the term of the patent right of Odiomes nail machines (ten years)..."

Today the Town of Gardiner is in Maine but in 1814 it was still part of Massachusetts. The town was founded in 1760 by Dr. Silvester Gardiner.

At the time of entering into the partnership agreement with Shaw, Gardiner owned two mill dams on the Cobbopeecontee River. In the agreement Shaw agrees to pay Gardiner five dollars per year for rental of land next to the second mill dam as well as "the sum of twelve and a half cents per annum for each square inch that the gate shall measure at said second dam through which the water shall run to said factor." Beyond this, the partners agreed to split construction costs and revenue equally.

As an aside, the square inch may seem an odd measure of water power. Rights to running water were so expressed in a large proportion of old deeds. Imagine a sluiceway or flume off a river directing water toward a mill's water wheel. Now imagine putting a bulkhead in the flume that blocks the water. Finally, imagine cutting a hole in the bulkhead whose cross-sectional area is a given number of square inches to let water pass through the bulkhead and proceed onto the mill. Hale cites a legal case that defined a square inch of water power as follows: "A square inch of water under a given head is the quantity of water that under the given head will flow in a stream having a section of one inch square, the discharge being made freely into the air, the head measured above the center of the orifice and section of the stream measured where it is the smallest."

Judging by the remnants of the accounting records for the Gardiner Nail Manufacturing Company in Shaw's archive the Gardiner Nail Manufacturing Company was modestly successful but the nail business was both highly competitive and subject to almost continuous disruption in both markets and manufacturing technology so it must have been a near run venture. In the final chapter, "Financial Losses", of his recollections in which Gardiner explains to his heirs what happened to the fortune he inherited and the fortunes he made, Gardiner simply says "The fulling mill, oakum mill, furnace, forge, nail factory, spike factory, pail factory, and other smaller concerns all proved failures, and the losses on several of them heavy."

== Honors and Offices ==
- Founding member, Secretary and Librarian of the Boston Athenæum (1807 – 1823)
- Fellow of the American Academy of Arts and Sciences
- Founding member of the American Antiquarian Society in 1812
- Secretary and vice-president of the Linnæan Society of New England
- Librarian of the Massachusetts Historical Society (1818 – 1823)
- Honorary member of the New York Historical Society
