= William Tudor (1779–1830) =

American businessman, journalist, diplomat, and author (1779–1830)

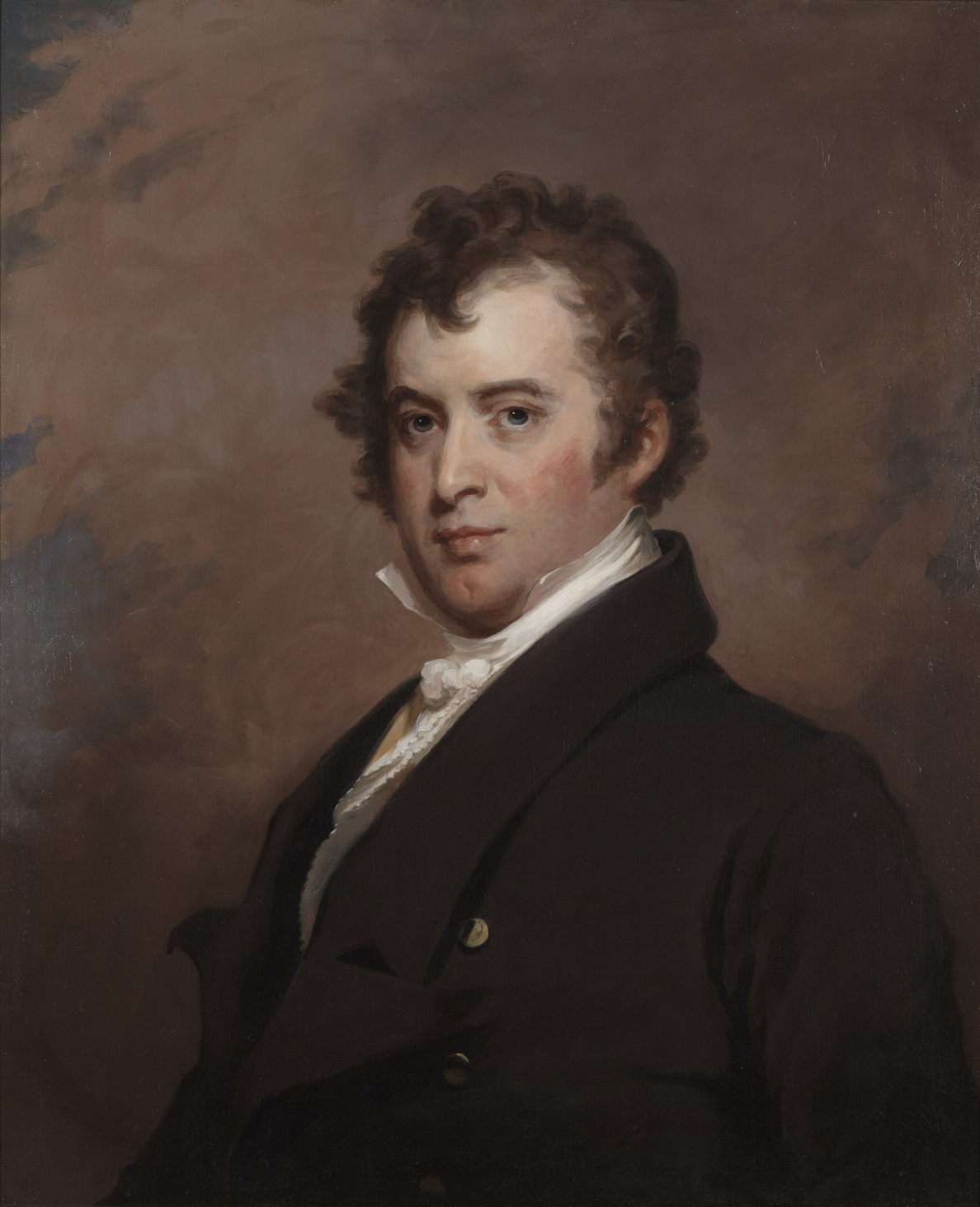
- Portrait by Thomas Sully after Gilbert Stuart

United States Chargé d'Affaires to Brazil
- In office June 25, 1828 – March 9, 1830
- Nominated by: John Quincy Adams
- Preceded by: Condy Raguet
- Succeeded by: Ethan Allen Brown

Personal details
- Born: January 28, 1779 Boston, Province of Massachusetts Bay
- Died: March 9, 1830 (aged 51) Rio de Janeiro, Empire of Brazil
- Education: Harvard College (BA)

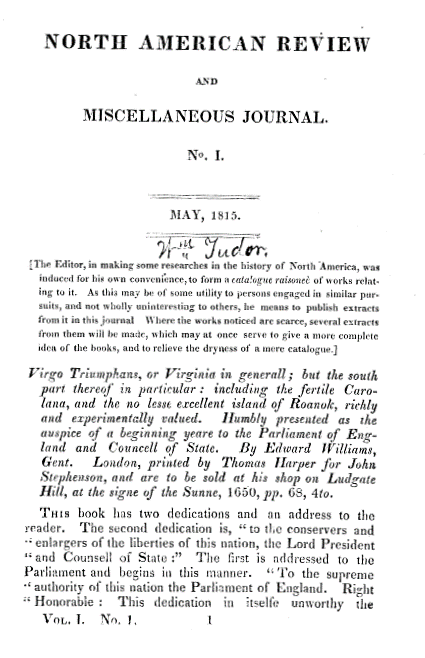
First issue of the North American Review with signature of its editor William Tudor

William Tudor (January 28, 1779 – March 9, 1830) was an American businessman, journalist, diplomat, and author from Boston who was co-founder of the North American Review and the Boston Athenæum. It was Tudor who christened Boston "The Athens of America" in an 1819 letter. His brother Frederic Tudor founded the Tudor Ice Company and became Boston's "Ice King", shipping ice to the tropics from many local sources of fresh water including Walden Pond, Fresh Pond, and Spy Pond in Arlington, Massachusetts.

== Life ==
Tudor was the oldest child of William Tudor and Delia Jarvis Tudor. He graduated from Phillips Academy, Andover and received a Bachelor of Arts degree from Harvard College in 1796. Tudor's travels to Europe polished his civility, and it is said that he held George III's interest in conversation long enough to bring complaints from the lord in waiting, who had others to present. Tudor wrote home to his mother from Paris in 1799, at age 20, that he was sending:

...a collection of music which I bought here, for which I paid with the binding about $400.00....s. It is a varied collection and for its size I trust a good one. There are about eighty sonates of Haydn, Pleyel, Koseluch, Steibelt, Clementi, Mozart etc. fifteen overtures, the most celebrated that you have not at present, such as Pamorze, Psyche, Ballet de Paris, etc, de Telemaque, la Caravanne, etc. etc. There is also a number of other pieces for the piano, a small collection of the most favorite ariettes, a few pieces of Musique for a Grand Orchestre, and also a set of quatuors of Pleyel and Boccherini, those of Pleyel are already known in America, but those of Boccherini, who is a favorite author, I suspect are not.

One of his visitors in 1782, the young Marquis de Chastellux, has left a record; he was delighted to find that Mrs. Tudor had arranged a program of French songs, to be sung by a young nephew of the admiral to the accompaniment of his harp. "I thought myself in heaven, or which is the same thing, I thought myself returned to my country."

Tudor was a member of the Massachusetts Historical Society and served as United States Consul in Peru from March 27, 1824, until May 15, 1827, and as chargé d'affaires at Rio de Janeiro from his appointment on June 26, 1827, until his death by fever there on March 9, 1830. His tomb was rediscovered by Charles Lyon Chandler (or Carleton Sprague Smith) in October 1944. Harvard alumni living in Rio and São Paulo raised funds for its renovation, and the restored tomb was unveiled on June 4 of that same year in the presence of Minister of Foreign Affairs Oswaldo Aranha and American ambassador Jefferson Caffery. It is located at the English Cemetery in Gamboa.

== Political opinions over the Spanish American War of Independence ==
Tudor in Peru, despite being a liberal and republicanist, he showed some sympathy toward the Royalist cause, as he believed that Peruvians and Latin Americans in general weren't prepared to being ruled under a Democratic System. He fundamented his analysis by criticising the lack of maturity on the Political Elites that leaded the Independence movement, like José de San Martín or Simón Bolívar, which he perceived as Criollo elitists without respect of local institutions or of the common people, nor having virtues or talents suitable for the art of government, only military and economic power to impose over the rest of the population in a state of Civil war than a sincere National War for their freedom (Tudor perceived that the masses were indifferent to the revolutionary movement, and that in the specific case of Peru the majority showed opposition to abolishing the monarchical institutions but were easy to be silenced through authoritarian repression). In contrast, he saw the Spanish Empire as more suitable to ensure political stability and economic progress because the majority of the population was accustomed to the traditional monarchy's form of government, as well as perceiving that royalist officials were better prepared in administrative skills and had less ambitious due to its common submission to a superior authority (The King of Spain), unlike the secessionists that were trying to impose over others through Caudillist strategies (like conspiring against others, having internal military skirmishes, making Coup d'état to local institutions, dissolving Parliamentary power if Congress questioned them, disrespecting Constitutions and interpreting them to his conveniences or trying to create a new one, etc.). Even Tudor elogiated the last Viceroy of Peru, Jose de la Serna, for being "an elderly man [who] is distinguished by his moderation, his humility and his uprightness", and he felt respect that the royalist authorities did not recognize him as Consul, not due to lack of will (since they received him with great courtesy and were willing to engage in conversations), but because they recognized the limits of their powers (since they could not authorize the presence of consuls without permission from the Spanish laws that regulated them).

The invaders [San Martin's Liberating Expedition of Peru] who came to proclaim freedom and independence were cruel, rapacious, unprincipled and inept. Their poor government, their unrestraint and their greed soon alienated them from the affection of the inhabitants and prepared them to acclaim the return of the royal armies, which were not prevented from recruiting their forces in the beautiful regions of Upper Peru.

Some Latin American authors criticised his views as biassed by accusing him of being an agent of USA's interventionism in the region against the national interests of Hispanics. However, recent historiography see him with more positive judges, considering him a different personality unlike his pairs Joel R. Poinsett on Mexico or William H. Harrison on Colombia (both who were more involved in USA's political affairs and so representing government's interest with more intensity, while also having some arrogance against hispanics) as he was only interested in his diplomatical duties of Consul rather than interfering on Latin American governments, even practising an strategy of having friendly relations with all the political factions that claimed to represent Peru (like the Royalists on Callao and Southern Peru, the followers of Torre Tagle on Trujillo and northern Peru, of Bolivar on Lima and Central Peru), and also having a Paternalist vision of Indigenous peoples and Black people (influenced by his abolitionists beliefs). This was due to the lack of interest in hegemonic nationalist historiography in studying his personality in depth (maintaining his figure in the obscurity in classical studies of history) and preferred to repeat and take as true the speeches against him that Bolivar's supporters generated due to his personal enmity with the Bolivarians (which started due to attempts of Bolivarian press to use his figure in a war of propaganda with opposite factions, even if that implicated to defame Tudor, and increased after Bolivar's attempt to be develop a Monocracy).

== Tudor and the Granite Railway ==
Tudor was indirectly involved in the Granite Railway. This was the first railroad in the United States, created to carry granite for the construction of the Bunker Hill Monument. George Ticknor, a well-known lawyer and antiquarian, first suggested the memorial and an interested group of men met for breakfast at the home of Colonel Thomas Handasyd Perkins. Among them were Tudor, Daniel Webster, Professor George Ticknor, Doctor John C. Warren, William Sullivan, and George Blake. On May 10, 1823, the first public meeting was called. Work proceeded somewhat slowly, but on January 4, 1826, citizens petitioned the Massachusetts legislature to build a railroad, which was then completed in short order and became operational on October 9, 1826, as the first railroad in the United States.

== Literary accomplishments ==
Tudor was co-founder and first editor of the famous North American Review, and cofounder of the Monthly Anthology, founded by Phineas Adams and then published from 1803 to 1811 as the vehicle of the Anthology Club whose members included Tudor, George Ticknor, Dr. Bigelow and Rev. J. S. J. Gardiner, Alexander H. Everett, and Rev. Messrs. Buckminster, Thacher, and the Rev. William Emerson (father of Ralph Waldo Emerson).

His chief literary works were the Miscellanies (1821), a collection of essays written for the Monthly Anthology and the North American Review, on subjects ranging from the "Secret Causes of the American and French Revolutions" to human misery, purring cats, and cranberry sauce; The Life of James Otis of Massachusetts (1823), generally considered Tudor's best work; and Gebel Teir (1829), an anonymous satire on international politics in which a council of birds, representing the United States, Spain, England, France, and the Elysian Fields, gathers to discuss politics.

== Selected works ==
- 1800 Letter on the Propriety of an Appropriate National Name. Mass. Hist. Soc. Collections, vol. 7, 1800.
- 1806 Considerations on the Expediency of a Bridge from one Part of Boston to another. Boston. [Anon.]
- 1809 An Oration July 4, 1809, at the Request of the Selectmen of Boston. Boston.
- 1817 Discourse before the Humane Society at their Anniversary, May, 1817. Boston.
- 1821 Letters on the Eastern States. 1820; Boston. [Anon.]
- 1821 Miscellanies. Boston.
- 1823 Life of James Otis, of Massachusetts. Boston.
- 1829 Gebel Teir. Boston. [Anon.]
- 1837 Correspondence while chargé d'affaires to Brazil. Washington. (28th cong., 1st ses., House Docs., no. 32).
- 1841 Character of Samuel Adams. Boston Book Col.
- 2005 "A Call to the Sea: Captain Charles Stewart of the USS Constitution". Washington

Diplomatic posts
Preceded by Condy Raguet	United States Chargé d'Affaires, Brazil; 25 June 1828 – 9 March 1830	Succeeded by Ethan A. Brown
