= Joseph Stevens Buckminster =

Unitarian clergyman (1784– 1812)

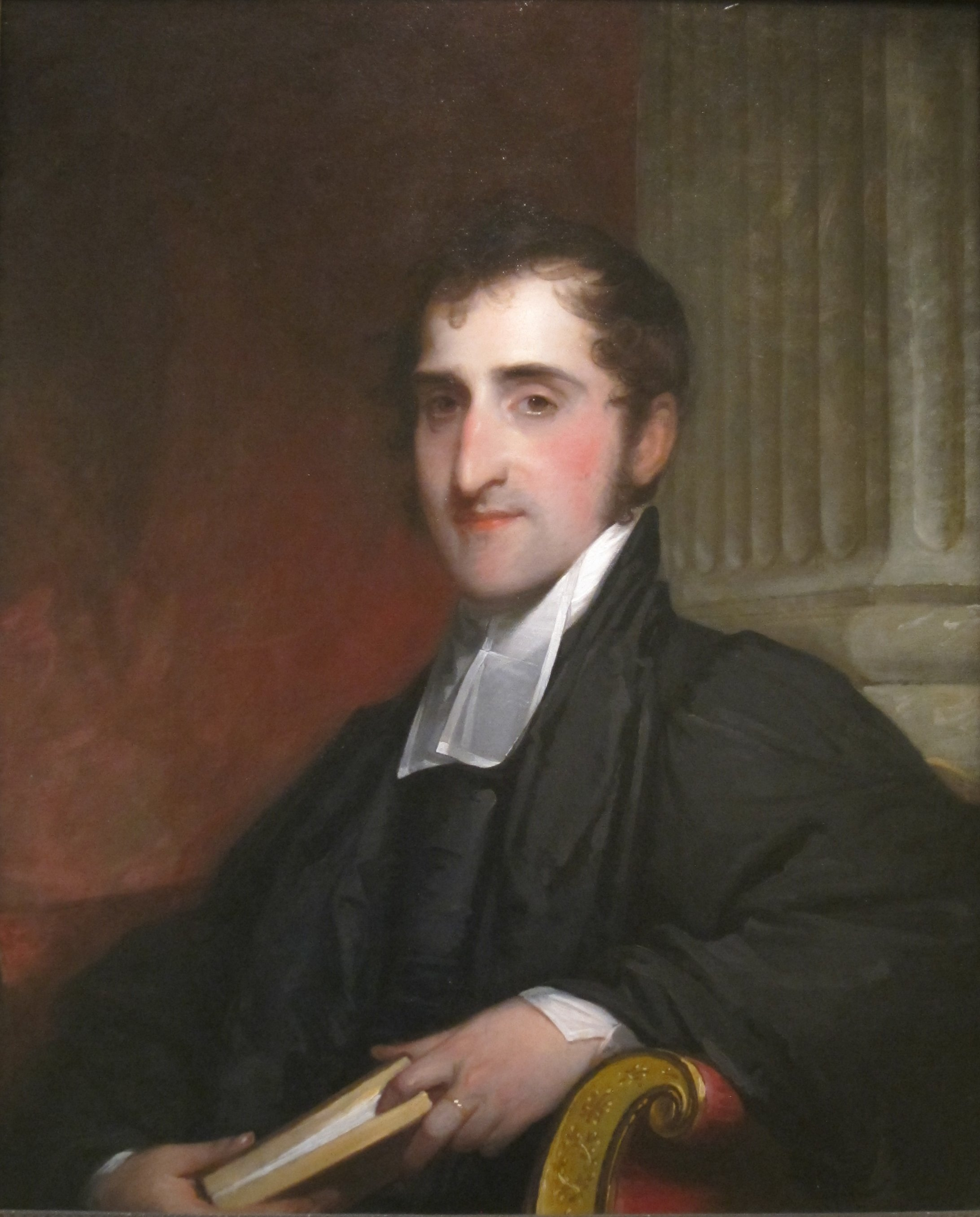
- Joseph Stevens Buckminster, circa 1810, by Gilbert Stuart
- Born: May 26, 1784; Portsmouth
- Died: June 9, 1812 (aged 28); Boston
- Alma mater: Harvard University
- Occupation: Unitarian preacher

Joseph Stevens Buckminster (May 26, 1784 – June 9, 1812) was an influential Unitarian preacher in Boston, Massachusetts, and a leader in bringing the German higher criticism of the Bible to America.

== Biography ==
Born in Portsmouth, New Hampshire, to the Rev. Joseph Buckminster, Buckminster was a precocious child. He learned Latin and the Greek New Testament at age four, entered Harvard College at 13, and graduated in 1800 at age 16 with both bachelor's and master's degrees. Upon his graduation, he spent two years as an instructor at Phillips Exeter Academy. In 1805 he became minister of the Brattle Street Church in Boston, and quickly launched an almost legendary career of eloquent preaching, biblical scholarship, and literary production which set the tone for the pattern of the minister as a man of letters.

During 1806-07 he traveled through Europe and collected a library of 3,000 volumes that would become the foundation of the library of the Boston Athenæum. Buckminster was elected a Fellow of the American Academy of Arts and Sciences in 1809. He was the most brilliant member of the Anthology Club, an early editor of the Monthly Anthology, and in 1811 was appointed Dexter Lecturer at Harvard where he occupied the first Chair in Scripture.

Buckminster died in Boston on June 9, 1812.

== Influence ==
Buckminster's influence on his contemporaries was striking. His mastery of the emerging "New Criticism" from German Biblical scholars led to his rational investigation of the Bible, subjecting its text to the same scrupulous scholarly investigation given other texts from antiquity. This approach heavily influenced William Ellery Channing, and gave rise to the first section of Channing's 1819 "Baltimore Sermon" for the ordination of the Rev. Jared Sparks. Buckminster further convinced the young Edward Everett to study for the ministry instead of the law.

== Literature ==
- The Works of Joseph Stevens Buckminster, 2 vols. (Boston, 1839).
- Eliza (Buckminster) Lee, Memoirs of the Buckminsters (Boston, 1851)
- Wilson, J. G.; Fiske, J., eds. (1900). "Buckminster, Joseph" . Appletons' Cyclopædia of American Biography. New York: D. Appleton.
- Gilman, D. C.; Peck, H. T.; Colby, F. M., eds. (1905). "Buckminster, Joseph Stevens" . New International Encyclopedia (1st ed.). New York: Dodd, Mead.
