= John S. J. Gardiner =

American Episcopal priest (1765–1830)

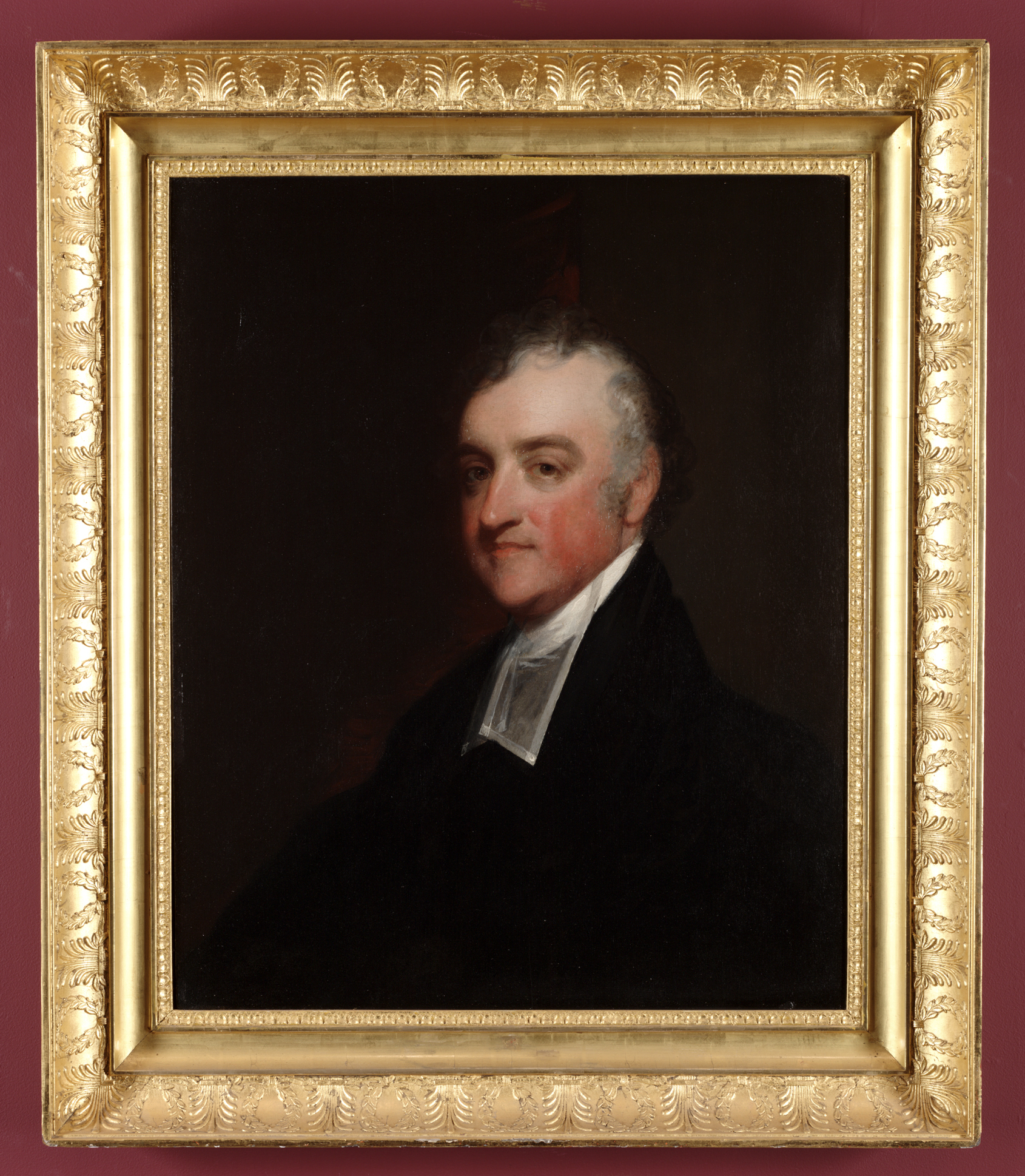
- portrait by Gilbert Stuart
- Born: John Sylvester John Gardiner; 1765; Haverfordwest, Wales, U.K.
- Died: 1830 (aged 64–65); Harrowgate, England
- Spouse: Mary Howard
- Children: 3
- Parent(s): John Sylvester Gardiner; Margaret Harries
- Relatives: John Perkins Cushing (son-in-law); Edward Gardiner (grandson)

John Sylvester John Gardiner (1765–1830), also known as John S. J. Gardiner, was an American Episcopal priest. He was Rector of Trinity Church, Boston, Massachusetts, president of Boston's Anthology Club, and active in the Boston Athenæum.

== Early life ==
Gardiner was born in Haverfordwest, to Dr. John Sylvester Gardiner (1731–1793) and Margaret Harries (1740–1786). His father served as Attorney General for the British government in the West Indies, where he spent much of his youth. He was the grandson of Silvester Gardiner.

He was educated in Boston and England, where he was a pupil of the famous Dr. Samuel Parr. Following the outbreak of the American Revolutionary War, he went back to England, only to permanently return to the United States in 1783.

== Career ==
Gardiner was for 37 years the "best-known and most influential Episcopal" clergyman of Boston. Trained for the law, he turned to divinity and for 25 years was rector of Trinity Church, Boston. Despite this conservative bent, he was on very amiable sociable terms with his Unitarian brethren. George Ticknor studied Latin and Greek under Gardiner's tutelage.

He served as president of Boston's Anthology Club and was active in the Boston Athenæum.

== Personal life ==
Gardiner was married to Mary Howard (1774–1848), who was born in Augusta, Maine, and was the daughter of Col. William Howard and Martha Howard. Together, they were the parents of three children:

- William Howard Gardiner (1797–1880), who was an 1817 graduate of Harvard College and who married Caroline Perkins (1800–1867), the daughter of prominent merchant Thomas Handasyd Perkins, in 1823.
- Elizabeth Gardiner (b. 1798), who died young.
- Mary Louisa Gardiner (1799–1862), married John Perkins Cushing (1787–1862), a wealthy China opium smuggler, in 1830. The town of Belmont, Massachusetts, is named after their estate.

Gardiner died in 1830 in Harrowgate, England.

=== Descendants ===
He was the grandfather, through his son William, of Edward Gardiner (1825–1859), a prominent architect.

== Works by Gardiner ==
- "Epistle to Zenas." Exchange Advertiser, June 22, 1786.
- Remarks on the Jacobiniad (1795)
- A sermon delivered before the Humane Society, of the Commonwealth of Massachusetts. (1803)
- A sermon preached at Trinity Church, December 9, 1804, on the death of the Right Reverend Samuel Parker, D.D. Bishop of the Protestant Episcopal Church in the state of Massachusetts. (1804)
- A sermon preached at Trinity Church in Boston on fast day, April 7, 1808. (1808; Reprinted in The Port Folio, 1808)
- A sermon, preached before the African Society, on the 14th of July 1810: the anniversary of the abolition of the slave trade. (1810)
- A sermon, delivered at Trinity Church, Christmas Day, December 25, 1810, on the divinity of Jesus Christ. (1810)
- A discourse, delivered at Trinity Church, Boston, July 23, 1812, on the day of publick fast in Massachusetts, upon the declaration of war against Great-Britain. (1812)
- Life a journey, and man a traveller: A New-Year's sermon, preached at Trinity-Church, on January 4th, 1824, and, by particular desire, delivered again on January 2, 1825. (1825)

== Image gallery ==
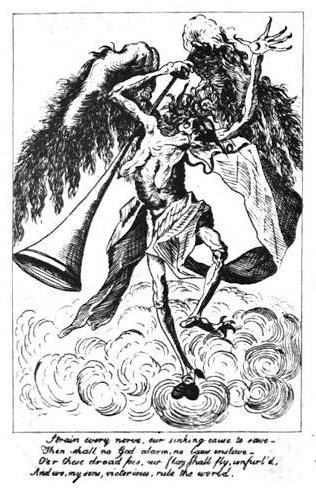
Illustration from J.S.J. Gardiner's Remarks on the Jacobiniad, 1795

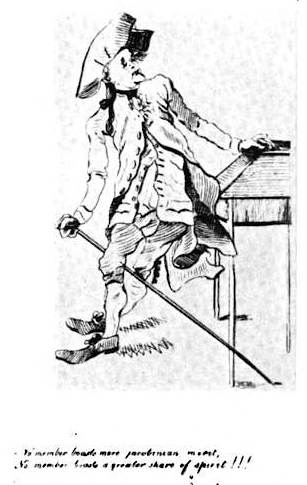
Illustration from J.S.J. Gardiner's Remarks on the Jacobiniad, 1795

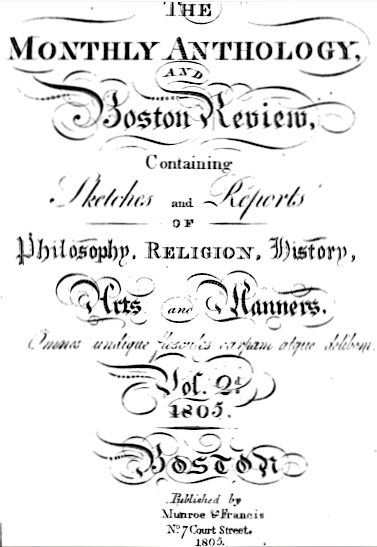
Monthly Anthology 1805

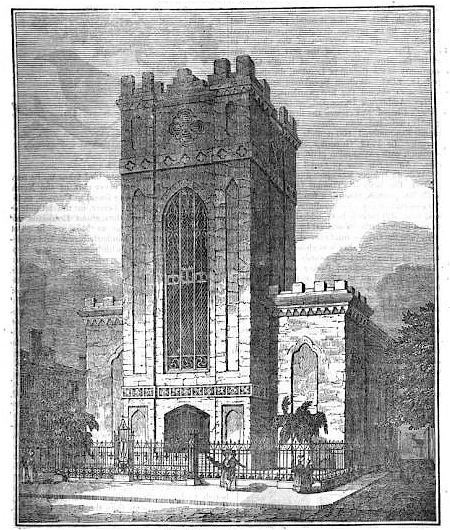
Trinity Church, Summer St. (1829 building). Illustration from American Magazine of Useful and Entertaining Knowledge
