= Edward Gardiner =

American architect

- Born: 1825; Boston, Massachusetts
- Died: 1859 (aged 33-34); Chicago, Illinois
- Spouse: Sophia Harrison Mifflin (m. 1849)
- Children: 5
- Parent(s): William Howard Gardiner; Caroline Perkins
- Relatives: John Perkins Cushing (uncle); John Sylvester John Gardiner (grandfather); Thomas Handasyd Perkins (grandfather)

Edward Gardiner (1825–1859) was an American civil engineer and architect. He co-founded the American Society of Civil Engineers and Architects and served as its first vice president. Five years later, he became one of the 13 founders of the American Institute of Architects.

== Early life ==
Gardiner was born in 1825 in Boston, Massachusetts. He was the second son of William Howard Gardiner (1797–1880) and Caroline Perkins (1800–1867). His father was a prominent Boston lawyer.

His paternal grandfather was Rev. John Sylvester John Gardiner (1765–1830) and his maternal grandfather was slave-trader Thomas Handasyd Perkins, in 1823.

== Career ==
Gardiner co-founded the American Society of Civil Engineers and Architects and served as its first vice president. Five years later in 1857, he was one of the 13 founders, along with Richard Upjohn and Richard Morris Hunt, of the American Institute of Architects.

Gardiner was known for his debate with Henry C. Dudley over the issue of architectural competitions.

== Personal life ==
In 1849, he married Sophia Harrison Mifflin (1822–1889), the daughter of Samuel and Elizabeth (née Davis) Mifflin, all of Philadelphia. Together, they lived in New Rochelle, New York and were the parents of five children, including:

- William Howard Gardiner (1851–1906), married Helena Lawrence Baird (1852–1925) in 1873, with whom he had three children. In 1890, he married Tita Butler, daughter of Joseph Butler of Castle Rhebbin, in Kildare, Ireland, and granddaughter of the last Duke of Ormond and Lord de Courcy, of Kingsale.
- Eugenia Gardiner.
- Edward Gardiner II (1854–1907), a biologist who married Jane G. Hooper, daughter of Nathaniel Hooper, on April 6, 1895.
- Elizabeth Gardiner (1856–1937), a prominent social reformer who married Glendower Evans (d. 1886), a Harvard Law School educated lawyer who entered the practice of Oliver Wendell Holmes Jr., in 1882.

Gardiner died in Chicago, Illinois of a fall from his horse, in 1859. After his early death, his family relocated to Brookline, Massachusetts with his father where they "grew up as poor relations of a very aristocratic family." Two years later, his widow moved the family to Boston where the children attended private schools.
