= James Hearst =

American poet (1900–1983)

James Hearst (August 8, 1900 - July 27, 1983), born James Schell Hearst, was an American poet, philosopher, and university professor, who was sometimes described as the "Robert Frost of the Midwest" (Alluding to this, someone once said to Frost, who was a friend of Hearst's, that he was the "James Hearst of New England.").

== Early life ==
James Hearst was the first child born to Charles E. Hearst and Katharine Hearst, on August 8, 1900. He was born on the family farm in Black Hawk County. His father was a farmer in rural Cedar Falls, Iowa, and a deacon in the Congregational Church. His mother was the first secretary at what is now known as the University of Northern Iowa. Hearst had three younger siblings: Robert Russell Hearst, Charles Joseph Hearst, and Helen Louise (Hearst) Speer. Having completed high school early, he started taking classes at Iowa State Teachers College (now the University of Northern Iowa) in Cedar Falls, sometimes riding horseback to campus from his family's farm. During World War I, he volunteered for the U.S. Army and was called up in September 1918, but the war ended shortly, and he was discharged by the end of the year.

On Memorial Day 1919, having returned to his family's farm, Hearst was swimming with his friends in the Cedar River. He dove off the dock into the river, not realizing that, over the winter, it had become dangerously shallow. He hit the bottom with his head, fractured his spine, and was left substantially paralyzed for the rest of his life. That moment in his life, he said, was "my nineteenth year where footsteps end". In the long process of recovering, he came up with ingenious workaround ways by which he could contribute to the operation of the farm, but, as his disability worsened, he increasingly turned to write about plants, animals, and people through the eyes of a Midwestern farmer.

== Writing career ==
Hearst's early published work appeared in Wallaces Farmer magazine. Over many years, his work was also published in The Nation, Prairie Schooner, Ladies' Home Journal, The Saturday Evening Post, Harper's, the Saturday Review, Commonweal, the North American Review, Poetry, the Chicago Jewish Forum, Canadian Poetry Magazine, The Sparrow, Educational Leadership, The Instructor, America, the American Friends Magazine, The Iowan, Kansas Magazine, Hawk and Whippoorwill, Compass Review, Poetry Dial, Discourse, The Humanist, theWormwood Review, Iowa English Workshop, Voyages to the Inland Sea, the Virginia Quarterly Review, Heartland, The Christian Science Monitor, Growing Up in Iowa and newspapers across the United States.

He was the author of ten volumes of poetry: Country Men (1937, 1938, 1943), The Sun at Noon (1943), Man and His Field (1951), A Limited View (1962), A Single Focus (1967), Dry Leaves (1975), Shaken by Leaf Fall (1976), Proved by Trial (1977), Snake in the Strawberries (1979), and Landmark and Other Poems (1979). Five other collections of his poetry were published posthumously: Selección de poemas de James Hearst: antologia bilingüe (1992), A Country Man (1993), Selected Poems (1994), The Complete Poetry of James Hearst (2001) and Planting Red Geraniums: Discovered Poems of James Hearst (2017).

In addition, he produced three books of prose: Bonesetter's Brawl (1979, novel co-written with Carmelita Calderwood), My Shadow Below Me (1982, an autobiography) and Time Like a Furrow: Essays (1982).

The fall 1974 issue of the North American Review, an award-winning literary magazine published at UNI, was designated a "James Hearst Issue". It featured Hearst's poetry, a checklist of his published works, a narrative of his life, and other's observations about the significance of his writings. Each year, the same magazine sponsors a competition called the James Hearst Poetry Prize.

== Personal life ==
Hearst married Carmelita Calderwood, of Marion, Iowa, in 1944. They were friends for twenty years before marrying. They were married for five years when Carmelita developed cancer. She died two years later on October 9, 1951. Following the death of his first wife, Hearst married Meryl Norton on December 5, 1953.

== Later life ==
Hearst was on the faculty at University of Northern Iowa from 1941 to 1975, during which time he held classes in the basement of his and his wife's home at 304 West Seerley Boulevard in Cedar Falls. Following the deaths of James and Meryl Norton Hearst (in 1983 and 1987, respectively), their residence (as specified in James Hearst's will) became the property of the City of Cedar Falls "to be used as a community arts center". After substantial expansion and redesign, the house began to function officially as the James and Meryl Hearst Center for the Arts in May 1989.

== Sources ==
- Scott Cawelti, ed., The Complete Poetry of James Hearst. Iowa City, Iowa: University of Iowa Press, 2001. ISBN 0-87745-757-3.
- James Hearst, My Shadow Below Me. Ames, Iowa: State University of Iowa Press, 1981. ISBN 0-8138-1136-8.
- James Hearst, Time Like a Furrow: Essays. Iowa City, Iowa: State History Society of Iowa, 1981. ISBN 0-89033-005-0.
- Wayne Lanter, Threshing Time: A Tribute to James Hearst. River King Press, 1996. ISBN 0-9650764-0-7.
- Robert J. Ward, James Hearst: A Bibliography of His Work. Cedar Falls, Iowa: North American Review, 1980. ISBN 0-915996-04-9.
