= Blair Fairchild =

American composer and diplomat

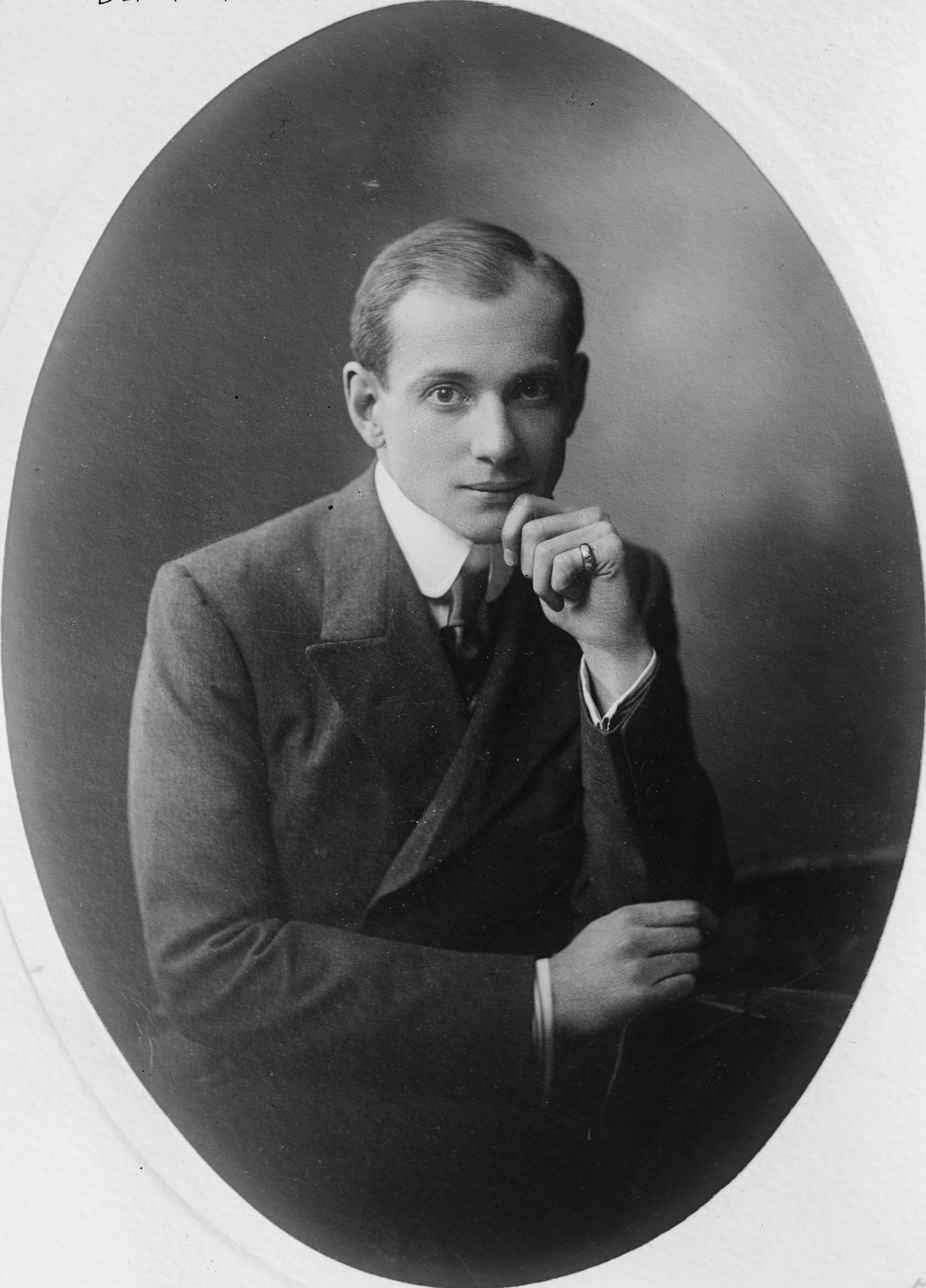
- Blair Fairchild
- Born: June 23, 1877; Belmont, Massachusetts, U.S.
- Died: April 23, 1933 (aged 55); Paris, France
- Education: Harvard University
- Occupations: Composer, Diplomat
- Spouse: Edith Howard Cushing
- Parent: Charles Fairchild
- Relatives: Lucia Fairchild Fuller (sister); Jairus Fairchild (grandfather); Lucius Fairchild (uncle)

J. Blair Fairchild (June 23, 1877 – April 23, 1933) was an American composer and diplomat. Along with Charles Wakefield Cadman, Charles Sanford Skilton, Arthur Nevin, and Arthur Farwell, among others, he is sometimes grouped among the Indianists, although he had only a marginal association with their work.

== Early life ==
Fairchild was a native of Massachusetts, the son of Elisabeth A. (Nelson) and Boston investor Charles Fairchild. Fairchild was the brother of miniaturist Lucia Fairchild Fuller; their grandfather, Jairus C. Fairchild, was the first mayor of Madison, Wisconsin, while their uncle Lucius served three terms as the governor of the state.

== Career ==
He studied at Harvard College and in Florence before embarking, after a stint in business, on a career in the diplomatic corps. He first saw service in Istanbul before being transferred to Tehran; in 1903 he settled in Paris, where he pursued further studies in music before becoming a composer. He died in 1933.

Fairchild had studied music while at Harvard, attending classes taught by both John Knowles Paine and Walter Spalding. Upon his arrival in Paris he sought further study with Charles-Marie Widor. His musical style was based on music he had heard during his diplomatic travels, and among his early works were two tone poems upon Persian legends, Zal and Shah Feridoun. He also wrote much in smaller forms, including many pieces for chamber groups. He also wrote songs and choruses. Fairchild's music has been described as derived from the same influences as the work of Claude Debussy, Maurice Ravel, and Igor Stravinsky.

Little of Fairchild's music appears to have been recorded. Some of his piano pieces may be found on a compilation of Indianist music released by Naxos Records on the Marco Polo label.

== Personal life ==
In 1903, he was married to Edith Howard Cushing (1871–1920), the daughter of Thomas Forbes Cushing and the granddaughter of John Perkins Cushing, a wealthy Boston sea merchant, opium smuggler, and philanthropist.

His wife died in Paris in 1920, and Fairchild died, also in Paris, on April 23, 1933.

== See also ==
- Fairchild family
