= Thomas Forbes Cushing =

- Born: December 19, 1838; Boston, Massachusetts
- Died: June 6, 1902 (aged 63); Manhattan, New York
- Spouse: Fannie Leslie Grinnell (died 1887)
- Children: Edith Howard Cushing
- Parent(s): John Perkins Cushing; Mary Louisa Gardiner
- Relatives: John S. J. Gardiner (grandfather)

Thomas Forbes Cushing (December 19, 1838 – June 6, 1902) was a prominent American member of Boston, New York, and Newport society during the Gilded Age.

== Early life ==
Cushing was born in Boston, Massachusetts on December 19, 1838. He was third son of John Perkins Cushing (1787–1862) and Mary Louisa (née Gardiner) Cushing (1799–1862), the only daughter of the Rev. John Sylvester John Gardiner (1765–1830) of Trinity Church, Boston. His siblings included John Gardiner Cushing (1834–1881), who married Susan Prescott Dexter, and Robert Maynard Cushing (1836–1907), who married Olivia Donaldson Dulany (1839–1906).

His father was a wealthy Boston sea merchant, opium smuggler, and philanthropist. His paternal grandparents were Robert Cushing and Ann Perkins (née Maynard) Cushing. He was the uncle of Grafton D. Cushing, a master at the Groton School who distinguished himself during the Spanish–American War and later served as Lieutenant Governor of Massachusetts. His father's Cushing ancestor had emigrated to Hingham, Massachusetts, during the early years of the Massachusetts Bay Colony.

== Society life ==
In 1892, both Cushing and his daughter Edith were included in Ward McAllister's "Four Hundred", purported to be an index of New York's best families, published in The New York Times. Conveniently, 400 was the number of people that could fit into Mrs. Astor's ballroom. His New York residence was at 29 East 39th Street in Manhattan. He was "one of the best-known habitues of the Metropolitan Opera House. He and his daughter had orchestra stalls, and they never missed a performance. They were regular attendants at all the Sunday concerts."

He was a member, and governor, of the Newport Casino, where he attended many dances, balls and social functions. He was also a member of the Knickerbocker Club, Manhattan Club, Metropolitan Club, Country Club, and of the Somerset Club of Boston.

== Personal life ==
Cushing was married to Fannie Leslie Grinnell (1842–1887). She was the daughter of U.S. Representative Moses Hicks Grinnell (1803–1877) and Julia (née Irving) Grinnell (1803–1872). Fannie's mother was a niece of Washington Irving, and her mother was a sister of James Kirke Paulding, a Congressman who served as the Secretary of the Navy under Martin Van Buren. Fannie's sister, Julia Grinnell (1838–1915), was married to George Sullivan Bowdoin (1833–1913), who were the parents of Temple Bowdoin (1863–1914), an associate of J.P. Morgan & Company. Together, they were the parents of: Edith Howard Cushing (1871–1920), who married the composer J. Blair Fairchild in 1903.

Cushing's wife died in May 1887. Cushing was injured in Newport in 1900 "when he was knocked down and trampled on by a horse." He died in New York City on June 6, 1902. His estate, including his "horses, harness, jewelry, silver plate, furniture and other household effects," was left in trust to his daughter.

=== Residences ===
On December 3, 1870, Cushing bought a property with frontage on Marlborough and Dartmouth Street from George Wheatland Jr. in the Back Bay neighborhood of Boston. He then had a residence, known as 163 Marlborough, built by architects Snell & Gregerson, who also designed the Concord Free Public Library. Cushing lived in the home until winter 1892 when he moved to Newport, Rhode Island, and rented the home to U.S. Representative Charles Franklin Sprague. He eventually sold the home to William Endicott Jr., son of William Crowninshield Endicott in 1898.

Forbes's cottage in Newport was situated next to Frederick Vanderbilt's Rough Point cottage, and was called "New Lodge." His cottage was described by The New York Times as "one of the handsomest of the fashionable residences of that resort". After his death, his daughter used the Newport cottage with her husband. Cushing and his wife built their Newport residence, designed by prominent society architect George Champlin Mason Sr., in 1869. Following Cushing's death in 1902, New Lodge passed to his daughter. In 1916, she sold the estate to Frederick Lothrop Ames Jr. and his wife who remodeled the cottage in a classical revival style which they then referred to as Ames Villa. In 1931, Jessie Woolworth Donahue, the daughter of Frank Winfield Woolworth (founder of F. W. Woolworth Company) and mother of James Paul Donahue Jr., bought the Villa and renamed it "Rock Cliff."
