= Anthology Club =

Literary society based in Boston, Massachusetts

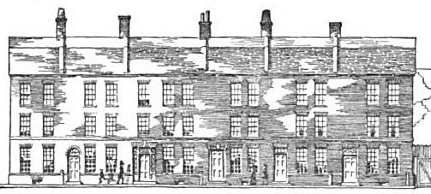
Joy's buildings on Congress St., Boston, "where during the early part of 1807 the Anthology Society had its Reading Room"

The Anthology Club, or Anthology Society, was a literary society founded in Boston, Massachusetts by the Rev. William Emerson, father of Ralph Waldo Emerson. It operated from 1804 until 1811.

== History ==
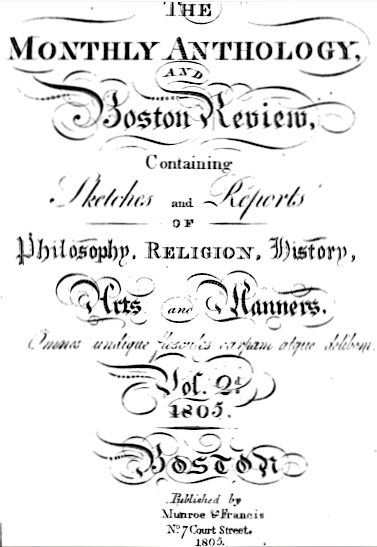
Monthly Anthology v.2, 1805, published by Munroe & Francis, Court Street

The society organized in response to the first publication, and first failure for want of patronage, of the Monthly Anthology. As recorded in the History of the Boston Athenaeum, an enterprising firm of publishers, "being desirous that the work should be continued, applied to the Rev. William Emerson, a clergyman of the place, distinguished for energy and literary taste; and by his exertions several gentlemen of Boston and its vicinity, conspicuous for talent and zealous for literature, were induced to engage in conducting the work, and for this purpose they formed themselves into a Society. This Society was not completely organized until the year 1805, when Dr. Gardiner was elected President, and William Emerson Vice-President. The Society thus formed maintained its existence with reputation for about six years, and issued ten octavo volumes from the press, constituting one of the most lasting and honorable monuments of the literature of the period."

Early club members included Samuel Cooper Thacher, Joseph Stevens Buckminster, and Joseph Tuckerman, pastors of churches in Boston and vicinity, John Sylvester John Gardiner, the rector of Trinity Church, president of the club throughout the whole period of its existence, and one of the most frequent contributors to its periodical, and William Tudor. Later members included Charles Stewart Dana, Alexander Hill Everett, and John Collins Warren. [William Smith Shaw, President John Adams' former Personal Secretary.]

The club's publication, the Monthly Anthology and Boston Review, or Magazine of Polite Literature, and had contributors including John Quincy Adams, Daniel Webster, and many scholars. However, with the death of Emerson in 1811, the Anthology ceased publication. The famous North American Review, which started bimonthly publication in 1815, under the direction of the Anthology Club, is generally considered a revival of the earlier magazine.

The Boston Athenæum is an outgrowth of the Anthology Club.

== Members ==
- Jacob Bigelow
- Joseph Stevens Buckminster
- Edmund Trowbridge Dana
- William Emerson
- Alexander Hill Everett
- Robert Field
- John Sylvester John Gardiner
- Robert Hallowell Gardiner
- John Gorham
- Thomas Gray
- Joseph Head Jr.
- James Jackson
- John Thornton Kirkland
- Joseph McKean
- Andrews Norton
- Andrew Ritchie
- Winthrop Sargent
- James Savage
- William Smith Shaw
- John Stickney
- Samuel Cooper Thacher
- George Ticknor
- Joseph Tuckerman
- William Tudor
- Arthur Maynard Walter
- John Collins Warren
- Benjamin Welles
- William Wells
- Sidney Willard
