= John Bromfield Jr. =

- Born: 11 April 1779; Newburyport, Massachusetts, US
- Died: 9 December 1849 (aged 70); Boston, Massachusetts, USA
- Occupation: Merchant

John Bromfield Jr. (11 April 1779 – 9 December 1849) was a Boston merchant and benefactor of the Boston Athenæum.

== Biography ==
John Bromfield Jr. was the second son and fourth child of John Bromfield Sr. and Ann Roberts. He was home schooled by his mother until the age of 12 when he entered Dummer Academy in Byfield, Massachusetts.

In August, 1782, the Bromfield family moved to Boston and rented the small house across the burying ground from King's Chapel. The house had previously been the home of Rev. Henry Caner, the minister of King's Chapel but at time it was owned by a family friend from Newburyport, Judge John Lowell. From 1809 to 1822 the house would be the home of the Boston Athenæum.

Chaim Rosenberg writes:

Francis Cabot Lowell took a keen interest in John Bromfield, born in 1799 in Newburyport. His family fell upon hard times and moved to Boston, where Mr. Bromfield “rented a house from his friend Judge Lowell.” The family could not afford to send young John to Harvard and instead apprenticed him to the store of Larkin & Hurd in Charlestown. Francis Cabot Lowell arranged for John to serve as supercargo on ships to Europe and the Orient. John began his career “without patronage and without prospects” but by wit, sweet-temper and hard work he advanced from a seafaring life to become a successful East India Merchant.

After two short trips to Europe, in 1809 Bromfield headed to Canton as supercargo aboard the ship Atahualpa. In the subsequent years he served as the foreign agent for William Sturgis, Henry Lee, Daniel Bacon, and Augustine Heard among other Boston merchants trading with China. By the time he was 34 he had accumulated his own fortune and he moved to Boston.

Bromfield never married. Quincy quotes him as saying “No woman who has a grain of discretion would consent to bind herself to such a nervous old bachelor as I am, and a woman without discretion would be --- not to my taste.”

When Bromfield died in 1849 the value of his estate exceeded $200,000 much of which his will directed to be distributed to public institutions in Boston as follows:

Massachusetts General Hospital	$40,000
McLean Asylum	$40,000
Massachusetts Eye and Ear Infirmary	$10,000
Boston Female Asylum	$10,000
Asylum for Indigent Boys	$10,000
Farm School at Thompson's Island	$10,000
Asylum for the Blind	$10,000
Seamen's Aid Society	$10,000
Town of Newburyport	$10,000

John Bromfield Jr. is buried in the Oak Hill Cemetery in his native town, Newburyport.

== The Bromfield Fund ==
Bromfield was an erstwhile bibliophile throughout his life thus it is not surprising that when he moved to Boston in 1813 he became a member and subsequently a proprietor of the Boston Athenæum. In 1845 he donated $25,000 to this institution to establish what is today the institution's largest book fund. Quincy writes:

Mr. Bromfield's repugnance to be known as the author of this gift to the Athenæum was with great difficulty surmounted. But, when it was urged that its origin could not long be concealed in an inquisitive community, that he might be subjected to inquiries, which his strict regard to veracity would render it impossible to evade, and also that it was as much a man's duty to be true to himself, as to be just to others, he finally acceded; and reluctantly consented, that if the proposal of his gift and its terms were accepted by the Proprietors of the Athenæum, his name should not be withheld.

The two bookplates of the Bromfield Fund, Type I and Type II. reflect this modesty.

In the Preface to The Athenæum Centenary Boston Athenæum librarian Charles Knowles Bolton writes:

No portrait of John Bromfield has been discovered, and this must be a lasting cause for regret to every reader who has seen Mr. Bromfield's name within the covers of Athenæum books.

It wasn't that an attempt hadn't been made to capture a likeness of Bromfield:

At [the January 1846] meeting of the Proprietors, a vote was passed, requesting Mr. Bromfield to sit for his portrait or bust (as he might prefer), to be preserved in the Athenæum. This vote was duly communicated to Mr. Bromfield by the President, who received a courteous answer, containing the following characteristic sentence: “Deeply impressed with the kindness of the motives of the gentlemen who have made this proposition, and fully appreciating the honor intended to be conferred upon me thereby (for which I beg you to tender them my most grateful and unfeigned thanks), I nevertheless beg leave, most decidedly and explicitly, to decline their very friendly and polite proposition.”

Three-fourths of the annual income of the Bromfield Fund is allocated to expanding Athenæum's book collection while the other one-fourth is added back into the principal. As of 2015 the balance of the Bromfield Book Fund stood at $6,497,488.
