= Eliza Lee =

American author

Eliza (Buckminster) Lee (1792–1864) was an American writer. She wrote a number of prose works in various genres, including biography, memoir, and fiction, and she translated from German.

== Biography and works ==
Eliza Buckminster Lee was the daughter of a minister, Joseph Buckminster. She was born around 1788 in Portsmouth, New Hampshire, and was educated by her father and her brother, Joseph Stevens Buckminster, both influential Unitarian preachers in Boston, Massachusetts. She was home-schooled even though her father (considered a forerunner of Transcendentalism) was active in promoting better educational opportunities for girls. Her mother died when Eliza was still young, and besides her education she was expected to perform a myriad of domestic duties. At age 39, in July 1827, she married a man from Brookline, Massachusetts, Thomas Lee, a "moderately wealthy businessman" who was nine years older than she was, and retired early to spend his time on gardening. She, in turn, devoted herself to writing and began publishing a decade later.

She and her family were friends with Daniel Webster, and after Webster's first wife, Grace Fletcher Webster, died in 1828, she took in one of their children, Julia, while Webster went through a period of grief. In 1856 she wrote a "sketch" of Webster's life, addressed to Fletcher Webster. Her father's education included training in Latin. In her memoirs of her father and her brother, she recalled, "He was in the habit of addressing familiar questions and simple household orders to his daughters in Latin, and then of explaining them or giving them the dictionary to find them out."

Her memoir of her father and brother, which a contemporary reviewer called an "affecting and very beautiful delineation of the life and character of these two remarkable men", and continues to be cited by historians of the period.

Historians classify Lee as a "liberal" for her time, along with authors like Catharine Maria Sedgwick, Lydia Maria Child, and Lydia Sigourney. Her early fiction is described as "village-sketch literature" (like Caroline Kirkland and Lydia Sigourney wrote), with "thick descriptions of rural life", and her novels as "historical romance" (like Nathaniel Hawthorne's fiction).

In two of her novels Lee treated the Puritan past of the New England area. Her Delusion; or the Witch of New England (1840) features, as a main character, Seymore, a Puritan student who becomes convinced that his fiancee, Edith, is a witch, and arrives at the conclusion that "his love for her [was] not ... a natural affection but rather ... a form of idolatry to be rooted out". In Naomi; or, Boston, Two Hundred Years Ago (1848), her title character is a Quaker convert who was raised in England and travels to America to visit her dying mother, a Puritan. When she arrives to find her mother dead, she quickly becomes torn between Puritanism and Quakerism, feeling comfortable with neither. She arrives at a kind of spiritual peace when she meets, and then marries, a Harvard graduate who is influenced by Transcendentalism. Her Parthenia, the Last Days of Paganism is a historical novel dealing with the Roman emperor Julian; a contemporary reviewer praised it as "the work of an imagination intensely vivid and sight-like", and concluded, "it seems to us that the spirit of the times and the actors may be much better learned from this fictitious narrative, than from any formal history."

Lee abridged and translated Flegeljahre, an unfinished novel from 1804–05 by Jean Paul, as Walt and Vult; or the Twins (1846).

== Bibliography ==
- Sketches of New England Life (1837)
- Sketches of a New England Village in the Last Century (1839)
- Delusion; or the Witch of New England (Boston: Hilliard, Gray, and Company, 1840)
- Naomi; or, Boston, Two Hundred Years Ago (Boston: William Crosby and H. P. Nichols, 1848)
- Life of Jean Paul F. Richter (London: Chapman, 1845)
- Walt and Vult; or the Twins, abridged translation of Jean Paul, Flegeljahre (Boston: James Munroe, 1846; New York: James Miller, 1863)
- Memoirs of Rev. Joseph Buckminster, D.D. And of His Son, Rev. Joseph Stevens Buckminster (Boston, 1851)
- Parthenia, the Last Days of Paganism (Ticknor and Fields, 1858)
