= Grover Clark =

American journalist and editor

- Born: December 14, 1891; Osaka, Japan
- Died: July 17, 1938 (aged 46); Charlottesville, Virginia, U.S.
- Education: Oberlin College (BA); University of Chicago (MA); Columbia University
- Occupations: Journalist; editor

Grover Clark (December 14, 1891 – July 17, 1938) was an American journalist and editor with expertise in Asian affairs.

== Early life ==
Clark was born in Osaka, Japan, to American missionaries, he was educated at Oberlin College (BA 1914), the University of Chicago (MA 1918) and Columbia University (PhD candidate, 1936).

== Career ==
Clark taught in Tokyo (1918–1920), then moved his base to Peking (Beijing, 1920–1930). He owned and edited the English language newspaper The Peking Leader. He also was a columnist for several American magazines and newspapers, such as the Christian Science Monitor. He moved to New York where he became a prolific writer and speaker on Asian affairs, with a regular column in Current History. He was a lecturer at Columbia University, and after 1937 a professor of economics at the University of Denver. He was a leader in the China International Famine Relief Commission. His books emphasized that colonies almost never produced a profit, but were undertaken for prestige—for "a place in the sun."

One legal magazine reported in 1937: "Professor Clark is widely recognized as one of the leading authorities on the Far East. His knowledge of Far Eastern peoples and their problems is based on long personal contact....Professor Clark has been much in demand for lectures on Far Eastern affairs."

== Death ==
Clark died of a heart attack while leading a scholarly panel at the University of Virginia.

== Selected publications ==
- Tibet, China, and Great Britain (Peking, 1924)
- "China in 1927" Chinese Social and Political Science Review, Vol. 12, Issue 1 (January 1928), pp. 136–196
- Economic Rivalries in China (Yale University Press, for Carnegie Endowment, 1932).
- "China's Economic Emergence." The Annals of the American Academy of Political and Social Science 168.1 (1933): 84–94.online
- "A Lull in China." Current History and Forum. Vol. 40. No. 6. 1934.
- "American Interests and Policy in the Far East" International Conciliation, Vol. 16, pp. 43–57 (1934)
- The Great Wall Crumbles (New York: The Macmillan Company. 1935. Pp. xvii, 406.) online
- The Balance Sheet of Imperialism: Facts and Figures on Colonies (Columbia University Press, for Carnegie Endowment for International Peace, New York, 1936). online
- A Place in the Sun (The Macmillan Company, New York, 1936)
- "China, Japan and Ourselves in Perspective" Vital Speeches of the Day (Aug 15, 1937) Vol. 3 Issue 21, pp 669+.
