= Phebe Marr =

American historian (1931–2024)

- Born: September 21, 1931; Mount Vernon, New York, U.S.
- Died: December 26, 2024 (aged 93); Washington, D.C., U.S.
- Education: Radcliffe College; Harvard University (PhD)
- Occupation: Historian

Phebe Ann Marr (September 21, 1931 – December 26, 2024) was an American historian of modern Iraq with the Middle East Institute.

She was a research professor at the National Defense University and a retired professor of history at University of Tennessee and Stanislaus State University in California.

Marr died at a hospital in Washington, D.C., on December 26, 2024, at the age of 93.

== Academic career ==
Marr received a Ph.D. in Middle Eastern history from Harvard University and a master's in Middle East studies from Radcliffe College.

== Professional career ==
Marr was on the board of directors at the Middle East Policy Council, a Washington, D.C.–based organization that seeks to educate American citizens and policy-makers about Middle East issues and Islam. She also served on the board of directors of the Hollings Center for International Dialogue, an NGO that works to promote dialogue between the US and predominantly Muslim countries.

== Published works ==
- Iraq's Refugee and IDP Crisis: Human Toll and Implications Middle East Institute
- Iraq's New Political Map, Special Report (January 2007)
- Who Are Iraq's New Leaders? What Do They Want?, Special Report (March 2006)
- Democracy in the Rough, Current History, January 2006 (PDF).
- The Modern History of Iraq (revised edition, 2012).
- Egypt at the Crossroads: Domestic Stability and Regional Rule, editor and contributor (1999).
- Riding the Tiger: The Middle East After the Cold War, editor and contributor (1993).
