= The Chicago Jewish Forum =

American Jewish magazine (pub. 1942–1969)

- Vol. 17, No. 2 of the Forum of Winter 1958
- Editor: Benjamin Weintroub
- Frequency: Quarterly
- Founded: 1942
- Final issue: June 1969
- Country: United States
- Based in: Chicago, Illinois
- Language: English

The Chicago Jewish Forum was an English-language quarterly magazine for American Jews published from 1942 to 1969. It was headquartered at 82 W. Washington St., Chicago, Illinois and published by attorney and anthologist Benjamin Weintroub (sometimes misspelt Weintraub), who also served as editor. Weintroub was sometime president of the Jewish Decalogue Society of Lawyers.

== History ==
Beginning during the Second World War and the Nazi Holocaust, the Forum was founded to give Jews "an adult publication" and "democratic journalism". It reviewed politics and literature, including from non-Jews, and published original stories and poetry. In 1948, it laid claim to being "the country's leading independent quarterly magazine".

The Forum ceased publication after 27 years in June 1969 due to changing times that "make their own demands." As works published before 1964 without subsequent copyright renewal, many numbers are in the public domain in the United States.
