= Boston Athenæum =

Membership library in Massachusetts, US

- 42°21′28.96″N 71°3′43.77″W
- Location: Boston, Massachusetts, U.S.
- Type: Private
- Established: 1807
- Architects: Edward Clarke Cabot, Bigelow and Wadsworth
- Branches: 1

Collection
- Size: 500,000+

Access and use
- Circulation: 17,725 (FY 2016)
- Population served: 4,345 (Membership, 2016)

Other information
- Director: Leah Rosovsky
- Employees: 67
- Website: bostonathenaeum.org
- Boston Athenæum
- U.S. National Register of Historic Places
- U.S. National Historic Landmark
- U.S. National Historic Landmark District – Contributing property
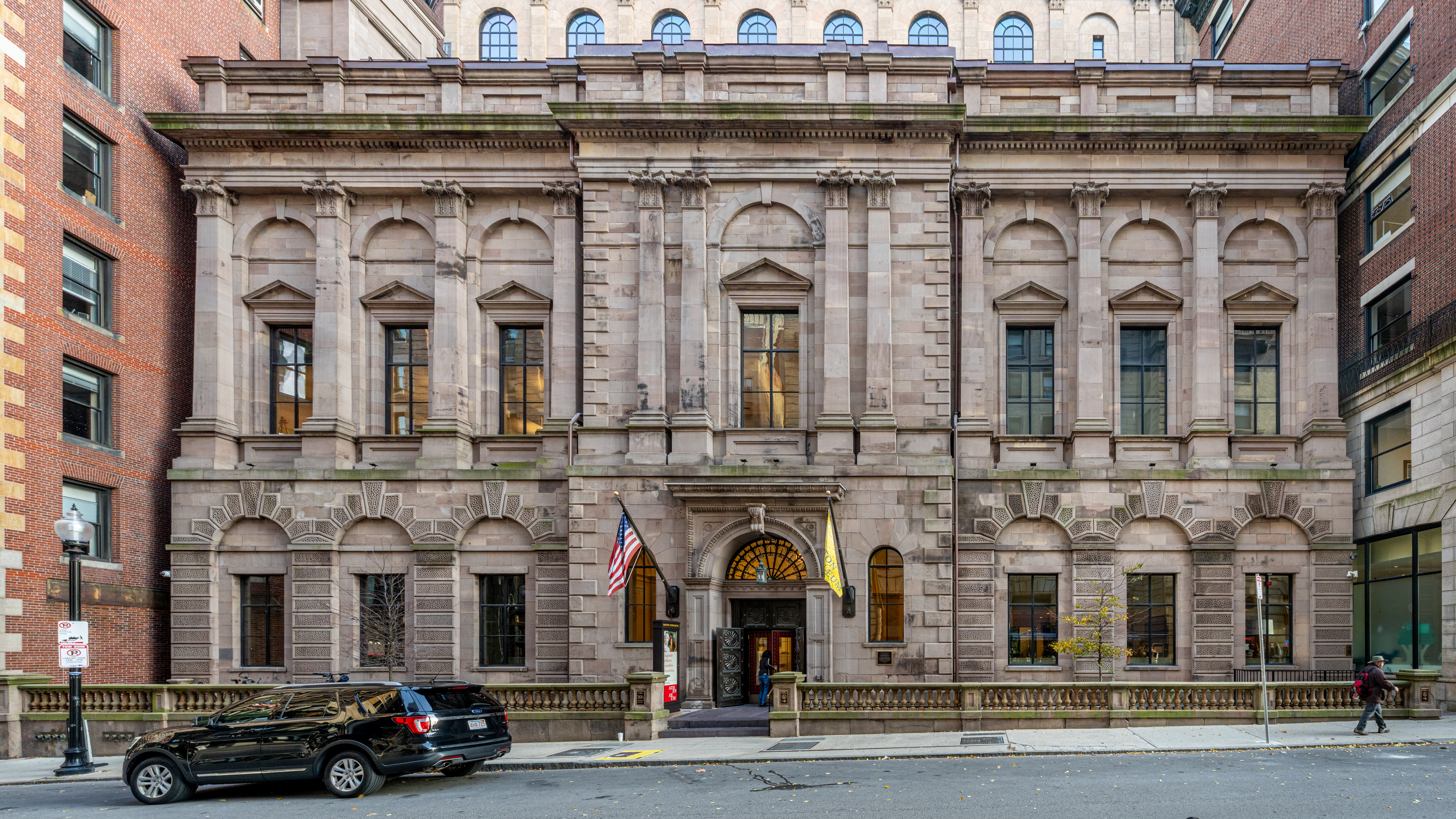
- The Boston Athenæum building today, as designed by Edward Clarke Cabot with additions by Henry Forbes Bigelow
- Location: 10 1/2 Beacon Street, Boston, Massachusetts
- Built: 1847
- Architects: Edward Clarke Cabot; Bigelow & Wadsworth
- Architectural style: Neoclassical, Renaissance Revival
- Website: bostonathenaeum.org
- Part of: Beacon Hill Historic District (ID66000130)
- NRHP reference No.: 66000132

Significant dates
- Added to NRHP: October 15, 1966
- Designated NHL: December 21, 1965
- Designated NHLDCP: October 15, 1966

The Boston Athenæum is one of the oldest independent libraries in the United States. It is a membership library, for which patrons pay a yearly subscription fee. The institution was founded in 1807 by the Anthology Club of Boston, Massachusetts. It is located at 10½ Beacon Street on Beacon Hill in Boston.

Resources of the Boston Athenæum include a large circulating book collection; a public gallery; a rare books collection of over 100,000 volumes; an art collection of 100,000 paintings, sculptures, prints, drawings, photographs, and decorative arts; research collections including one of the world's most important collections of primary materials on the American Civil War; and a public forum offering lectures, readings, concerts, and other events. Special treasures include the largest portion of President George Washington's library from Mount Vernon; Jean-Antoine Houdon busts of Washington, Benjamin Franklin, and Lafayette once owned by Thomas Jefferson; a first edition copy of John James Audubon's The Birds of America; a 1799 set of Francisco Goya's Los caprichos; portraits by Gilbert Stuart, Chester Harding, and John Singer Sargent; and one of the most extensive collections of contemporary artists' books in the United States.

The Boston Athenæum is also known for the many prominent writers, scholars, and politicians who have been members, including Ralph Waldo Emerson, Nathaniel Hawthorne, Louisa May Alcott, Oliver Wendell Holmes Sr., Oliver Wendell Holmes Jr., John Quincy Adams, Margaret Fuller, Francis Parkman, Amy Lowell, John F. Kennedy, and Edward M. Kennedy.

== History ==
=== 19th century ===
In 1803, Phineas Adams, a young Harvard graduate, established The Monthly Anthology, or Magazine of Polite Literature. In 1804, he ran out of money and left New England in 1804, but Munroe and Francis, the printers, convinced other young men to contribute to and continue the magazine under the new title The Monthly Anthology and Boston Review. By 1805, these men founded the Anthology Society. In 1807, desiring a reading room, they founded the Boston Athenæum.

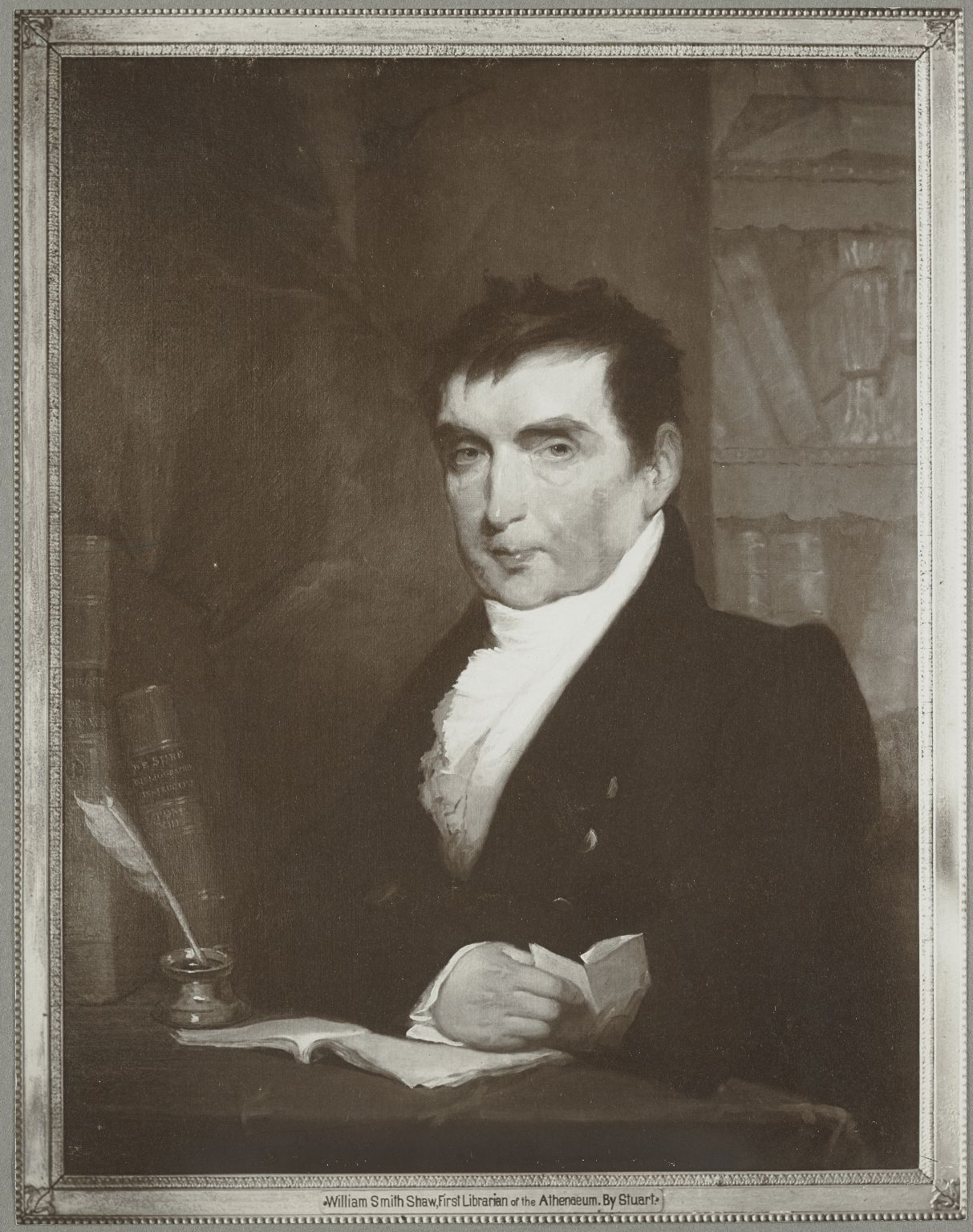
William Smith Shaw, librarian (c. 1807–1823)

The first librarian was William Smith Shaw, who, with the new trustees, had ambitious plans for the Athenæum, basing their vision on the Athenæum and Lyceum in Liverpool, England. They envisioned a library encompassing books on all subjects in English and foreign languages, a gallery of sculptures and paintings, collections of coins and natural curiosities, and even a laboratory. This ambitious design has developed since then with some changes in focus (e.g., there is no chemistry lab) but remaining true to the ideal expressed in the institution's seal, chosen in 1814: Literarum fructus dulces, "Sweet are the Fruits of Letters."

The first yearly subscriptions were sold for ten dollars; only members had access to the Athenæum's rooms, though they were allowed to bring guests. The Athenæum's collections were initially non-circulating, meaning that even members could not check out books to take home.

At first, the Boston Athenæum rented rooms. In 1809, it bought a small house adjacent to the King's Chapel Burying Ground. In 1822, it moved into a mansion on Pearl Street, where a lecture hall and gallery space were added within four years.

In 1823, Shaw stepped down as librarian, and the King's Chapel Library and the books constituting the Theological Library of the Boston Association of Ministers were deposited in the Athenæum. Work began on a shelf catalog in 1827. That same year, the art gallery was established, and the first annual exhibition opened. Measures were undertaken in 1830 to enable the borrowing of books. Once the Athenæum became a circulating library, only four books were allowed to be checked out at a time.

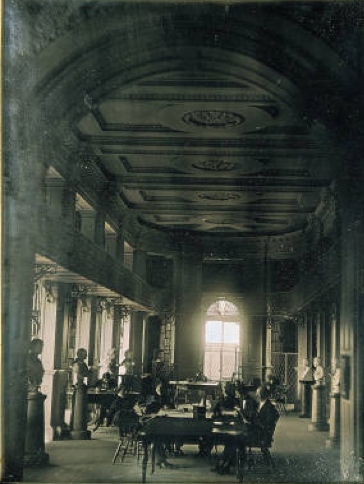
Interior of the Athenæum, 10½ Beacon Street, c. 1855 (Southworth & Hawes)

==== 10½ Beacon Street ====
By the early 1840s, Boston was a fast-growing city, and Pearl Street was in a built-up commercial district, with warehouses crowding around the Athenæum building. The trustees moved to construct a new building in order to facilitate access to the Athenæum. Land was acquired on Beacon Street overlooking the Old Granary Burying Ground, and the cornerstone of a new building was laid in 1847.

In 1849, the Athenæum opened in its current location at 10½ Beacon Street. It was the first space designed for the Boston Athenæum's specific needs. The first floor held the sculpture gallery; the second, the library; and the third, the paintings gallery.

The architect was Edward Clarke Cabot, an artist and dilettante whose design was selected because his ingenious ground-level arch over graves in the Granary Burial Ground allowed more space on all floors above the basement level. The neo-Palladian façade of Patterson sandstone was unique in Boston and remains so today.

The Boston Athenæum included sculptures by John Frazee.

==== Cutter Expansive Classification ====
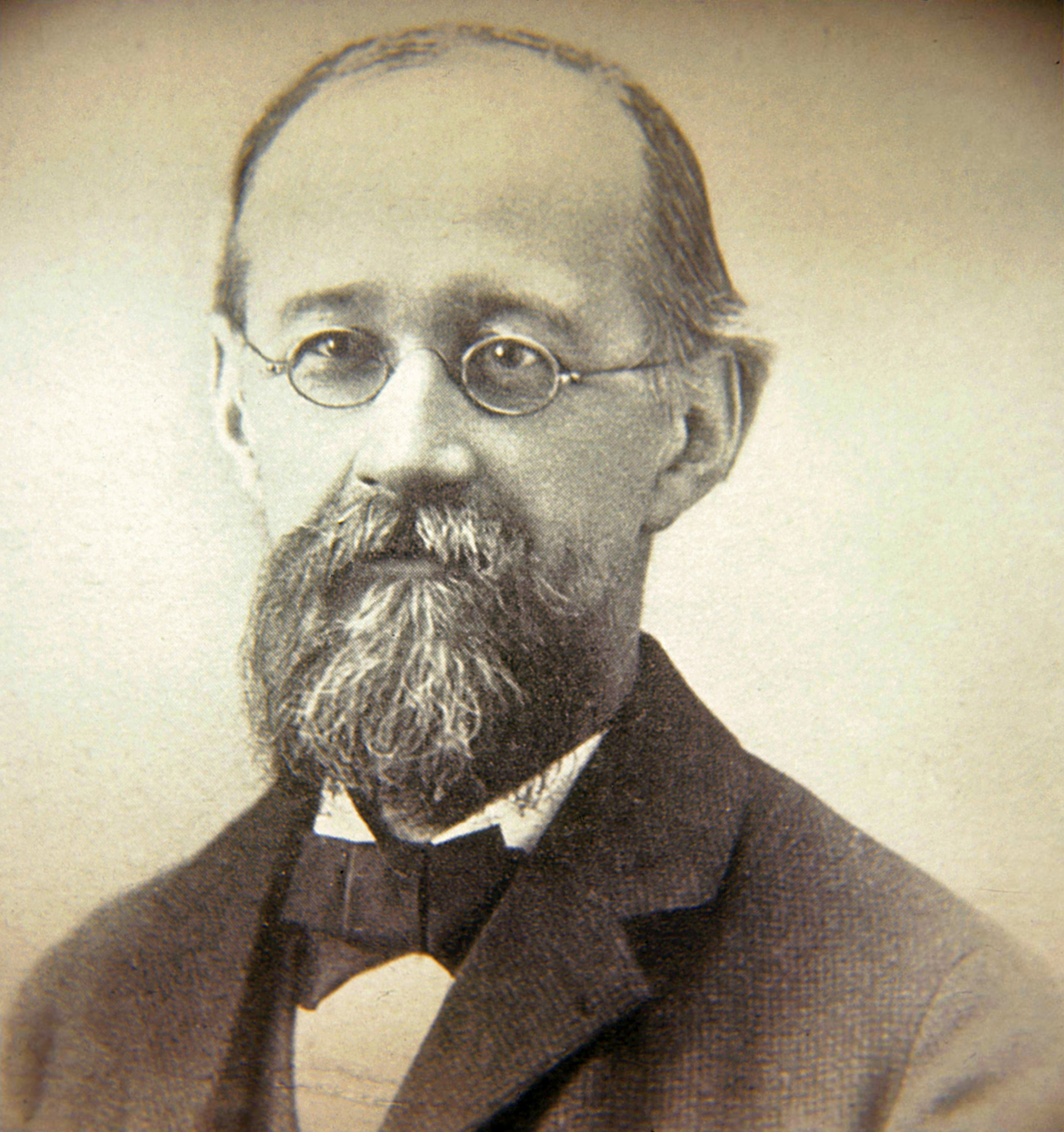
Charles Ammi Cutter, librarian (c. 1869)

Charles Ammi Cutter became librarian in 1869, succeeding William Frederick Poole. Until this point, work had been uninspired on the comprehensive catalog of the library's holdings. The Athenæum's exhibition area opened up when the Museum of Fine Arts moved the collections into their own space overlooking Copley Square. Cutter took advantage of the space, using it to spread out the collections and to revise and complete the five-volume catalog. He created his own classification system, known as Expansive Classification, in order to revise and finish the five-volume catalog. Later, the Cutter system became the basis for the Library of Congress classification system; the sections of call number used to alphabetically designate authors’ names are still known as "Cutter numbers" in the Library of Congress system.

==== Establishment of the Museum of Fine Arts ====
Many of the trustees of the Boston Athenæum participated in the movement to create a separate museum in Boston. In the years 1872–1876, Boston's Museum of Fine Arts exhibited in the Athenæum's gallery space while awaiting the completion of its new building's construction. There would be no more annual exhibitions; shelves were installed and the library spread to the first and third floors.

=== 20th and 21st centuries ===
From 1913 to 1914, the Boston Athenæum employed the architectural firm of Bigelow and Wadsworth to expand the building. The fourth and fifth floors were set back so as not to disrupt the symmetry of the façade. This renovation fireproofed the building and expanded the space, including the addition of the beautiful fifth floor reading room and the fourth floor Trustees’ Room. At the same time, much-needed shelving was installed in the form of a drum stack — a ten-story Snead stack occupying a semi-circular space from the basement to the third floor.

The Boston Athenæum was declared a National Historic Landmark in 1966. Between 1999 and 2002, the Boston Athenæum underwent a major renovation to update its climate control system, gain more space for books, and add new gallery space on the first floor.

In May 2020, Leah Rosovsky was appointed as Stanford Calderwood Director of the Athenæum.

==== Gilbert Stuart portraits ====
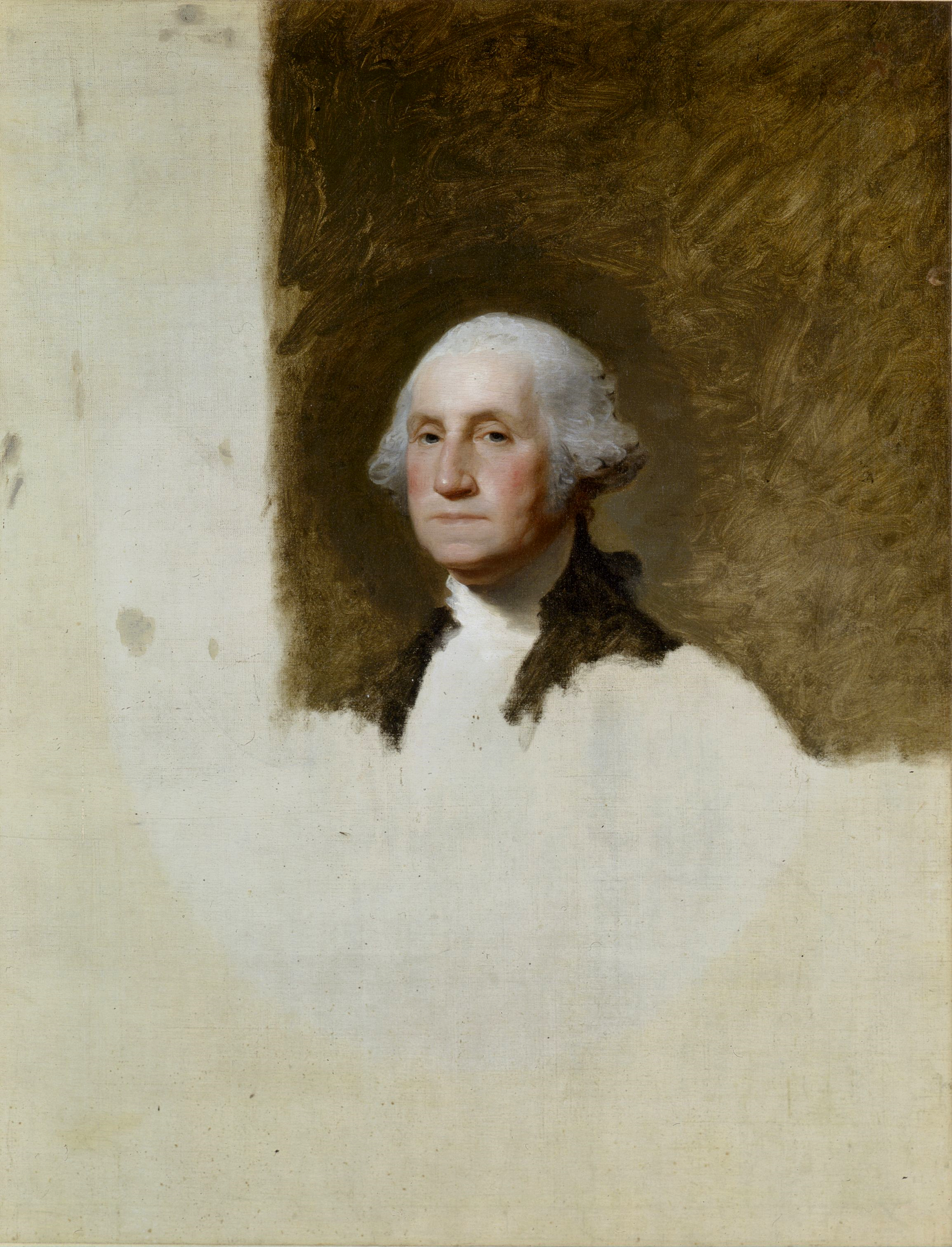
The unfinished 1796 Gilbert Stuart portrait of George Washington, one of two portraits at the center of the controversy.

The Athenæum had long owned two famous, unfinished portraits of George and Martha Washington. They had been on loan to the Boston Museum of Fine Art since 1876, but eventually the Athenæum, needing money, asked the Museum to purchase them outright, which the Museum declined to do. The Athenæum then agreed to sell the portraits to the National Portrait Gallery (an arm of the Smithsonian Institution in Washington, D.C.) for $5 million; when this agreement became public in April 1979, there was strong public opposition to it in Boston but the National Portrait Gallery argued that the portraits were of national historic value and belonged in the Smithsonian.

A campaign by prominent Bostonians to raise $5 million to keep the portraits in Massachusetts fell well short of its goal. The Athenæum refused to lower the $5 million price, which it called a significant discount from the portraits' market value. The City of Boston sued to forestall the sale, naming Massachusetts Attorney General Francis X. Bellotti (whose office the Commonwealth's constitution designates as "custodian of public property") in the suit, and this led Bellotti to declare that the portraits could not be sold without his permission.

In early 1980, the National Portrait Gallery and the Boston Museum of Fine Arts agreed to jointly purchase the portraits, which would then spend alternating three-year terms at each institution.

=== Notable members ===
- Hannah Adams
- John Adams
- John Quincy Adams
- Louisa May Alcott
- Cyrus Alger
- Erastus Brigham Bigelow
- Nathaniel Bowditch
- Uriah Boyden
- Josiah Cooke Jr.
- Charles Ammi Cutter
- Ralph Waldo Emerson
- Margaret Fuller
- Samuel Griswold Goodrich
- Augustus Addison Gould
- Thaddeus Mason Harris
- Nathaniel Hawthorne
- Oliver Wendell Holmes Sr.
- Oliver Wendell Holmes Jr.
- John Jay Chapman
- John Fitzgerald Kennedy
- Edward M. Kennedy
- Amy Lowell
- Paul Moody
- Daniel Treadwell
- Francis Parkman

== Mission statement ==
The mission of the Boston Athenaeum is to engage all who seek knowledge by making accessible the library's collections and spaces, thereby inspiring reflection, discourse, creative expression, and joy.

== Holdings ==
The Athenaeum's holdings currently include over 600,000 volumes, and the collections' strengths focus on Boston and New England history, biography, British and American literature, as well as fine and decorative arts. The Boston Athenaeum's rare and circulating books, maps and manuscripts reflect the collecting interests of the Library as it has narrowed its focus from encyclopedic in the 19th century to an emphasis on the humanities and its large, historic collection of art includes paintings, sculpture, prints, photographs, and decorative arts. Over 260 book funds, the oldest and largest of which was endowed by John Bromfield Jr. in 1845, support the addition of more than 3,000 volumes per year to the collection.

=== Printed catalogs ===
In addition to catalogs of special collections such as the catalog of the Washington Collection, the Athenaeum printed the following general-purpose catalogs of books in its collection before creating a card catalog in 1903:

- 1810 Catalogue of the books in the Boston Athenaeum. 267 pp. 8°
- 1827 Catalogue of books in the Boston Athenaeum : to which are added the by-laws of the institution, and a list of its proprietors and subscribers. 356 pp. 8°
- 1830 Catalogue of books added to the Boston Athenaeum since the publication of the catalogue in January 1827. 64 pp. 8°
- 1831 Catalogue of tracts, scientific and alphabetical index. 5 v.
- 1834 Catalogue of books added to the Boston Athenaeum in 1830–1833. 80 pp. 8°
- 1840 Catalogue of books added to the Boston Athenaeum, since the publication of the catalogue in January, 1827. 179 pp. 8°
- 1849 Shelf Lists, 1849.
- 1863–1868 List of books added to the library of the Boston Athenaeum. 6 v. 8°
- 1868–1871 List of books added to the library of the Boston Athenaeum. 17 nos. 8°
- 1877–1896 List of additions. Second Series. No. 1–354. September 1, 187 to March 2, 1896. 1472 pp. sm. 4°
- 1874 Catalogue of the library of the Boston Athenaeum. 1807–1871. 5 v. 3402 pp. l. 8°

The first catalog, that of 1810, was compiled by the Rev. Joseph McKean.

=== Digital collections ===
The Athenaeum has digitized a wide range of its holdings, and continues to do so. The digitized holdings are described on-line and are an effort to make them more accessible to researchers, students, Athenaeum members, and scholars.

A few examples from the many collections in the digital library:

- Henry Schoolcraft Collection of Books in Native American Languages
- Confederate States of America Imprint Collection - stamps, paper currency, and financial documents
- Art Deco Designs by Cartier
- Rare bookbindings from George Washington's personal library
- Alice Mason Civil War Photography,

Since 2013, the Athenaeum has made its extensive on-going lecture series available to a wider audience through Vimeo, an open video platform.

=== Rare books and manuscripts collections ===
A few examples of the special collections:

- Portions of the personal libraries of Cardinal Cheverus, Henry Knox, and George Washington.
- The Groome Gypsy Collection, the Danforth Alchemy Collection, and the Merrymount Press Collection.

The collections include many areas that are not documented elsewhere, e.g., the newspapers from the Confederate States of America Imprint Collection

== Image gallery ==
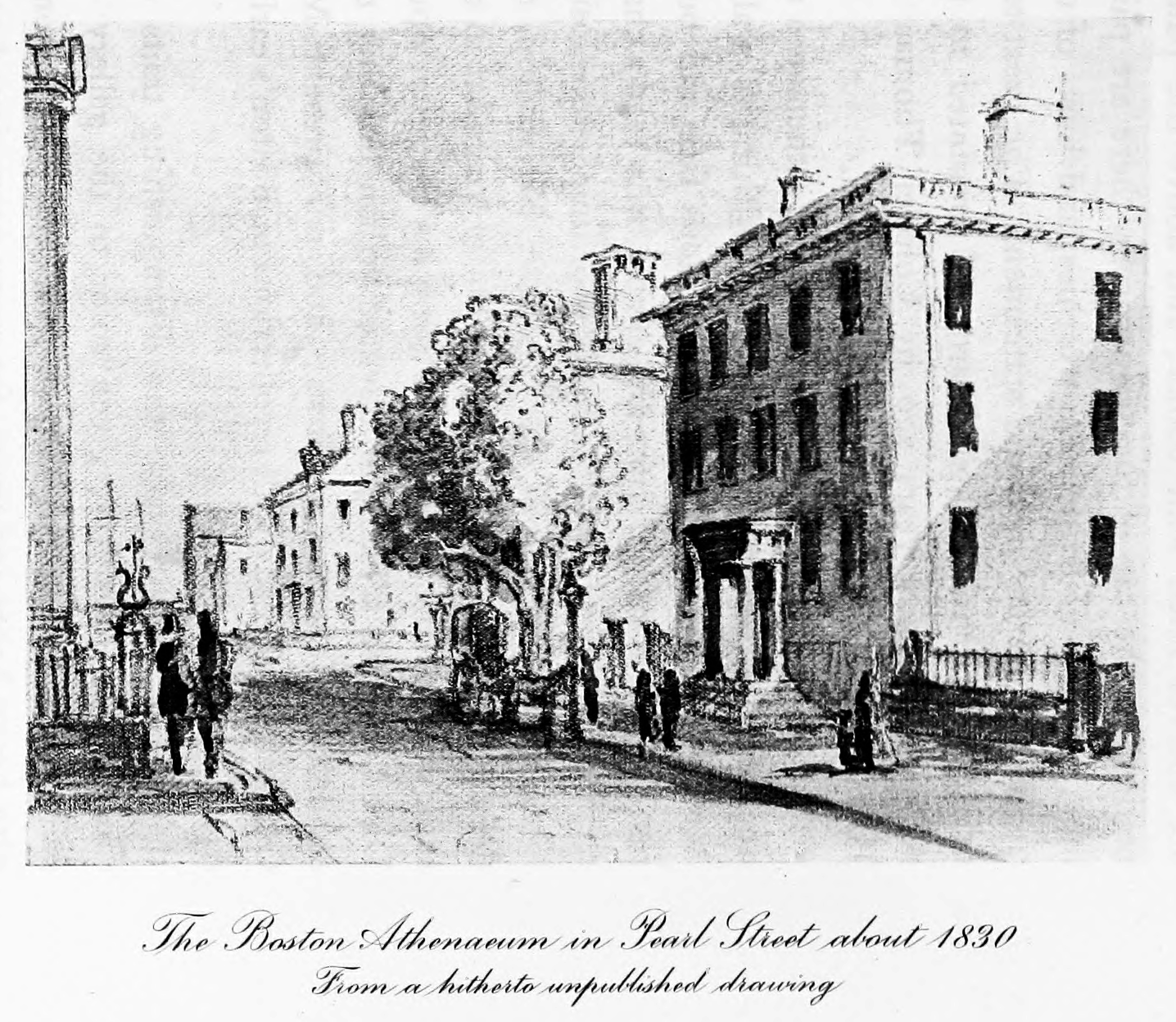
Athenæum, Pearl Street

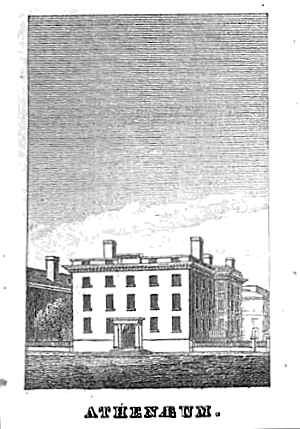
Athenæum, Pearl Street

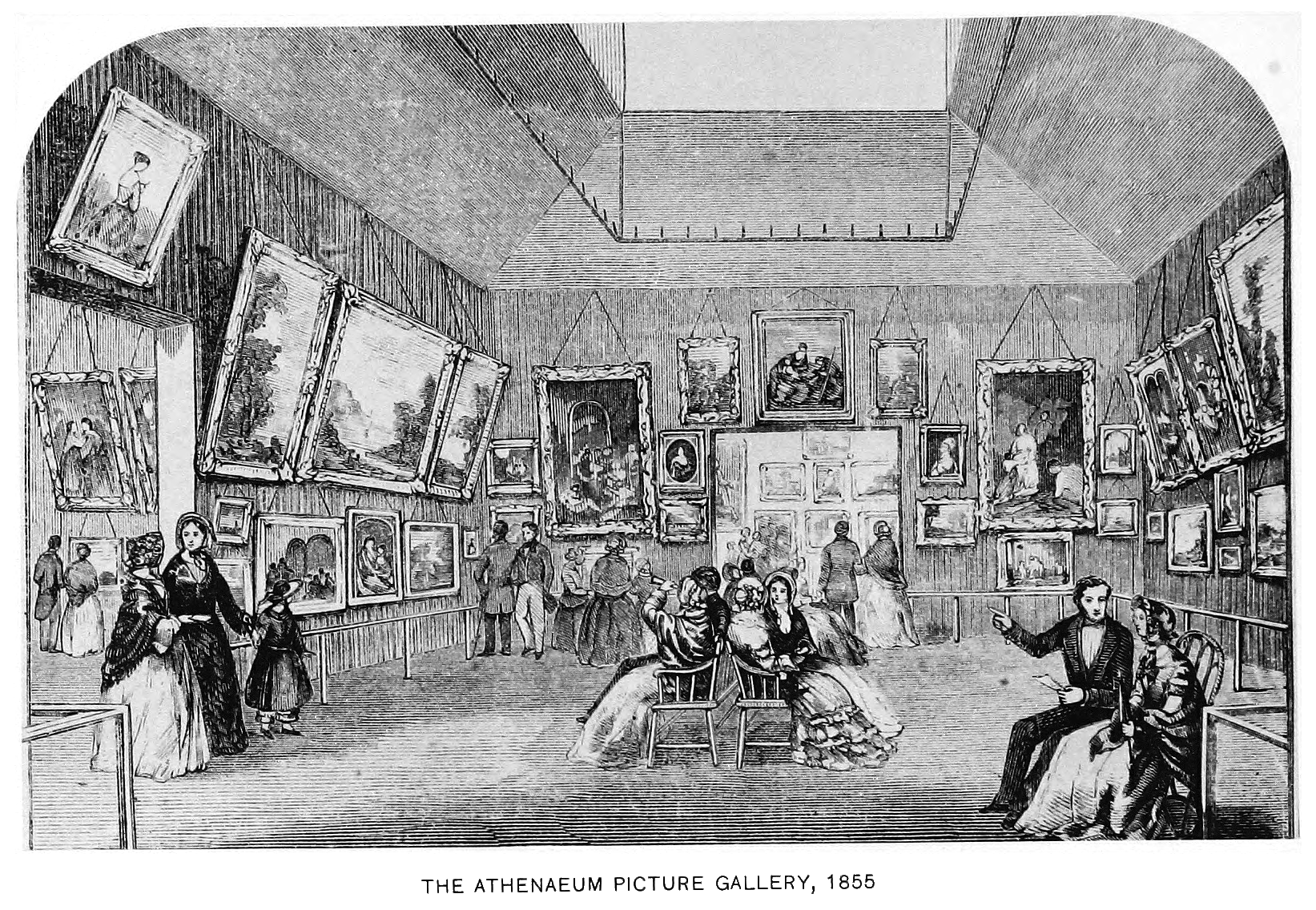
Interior, 1855

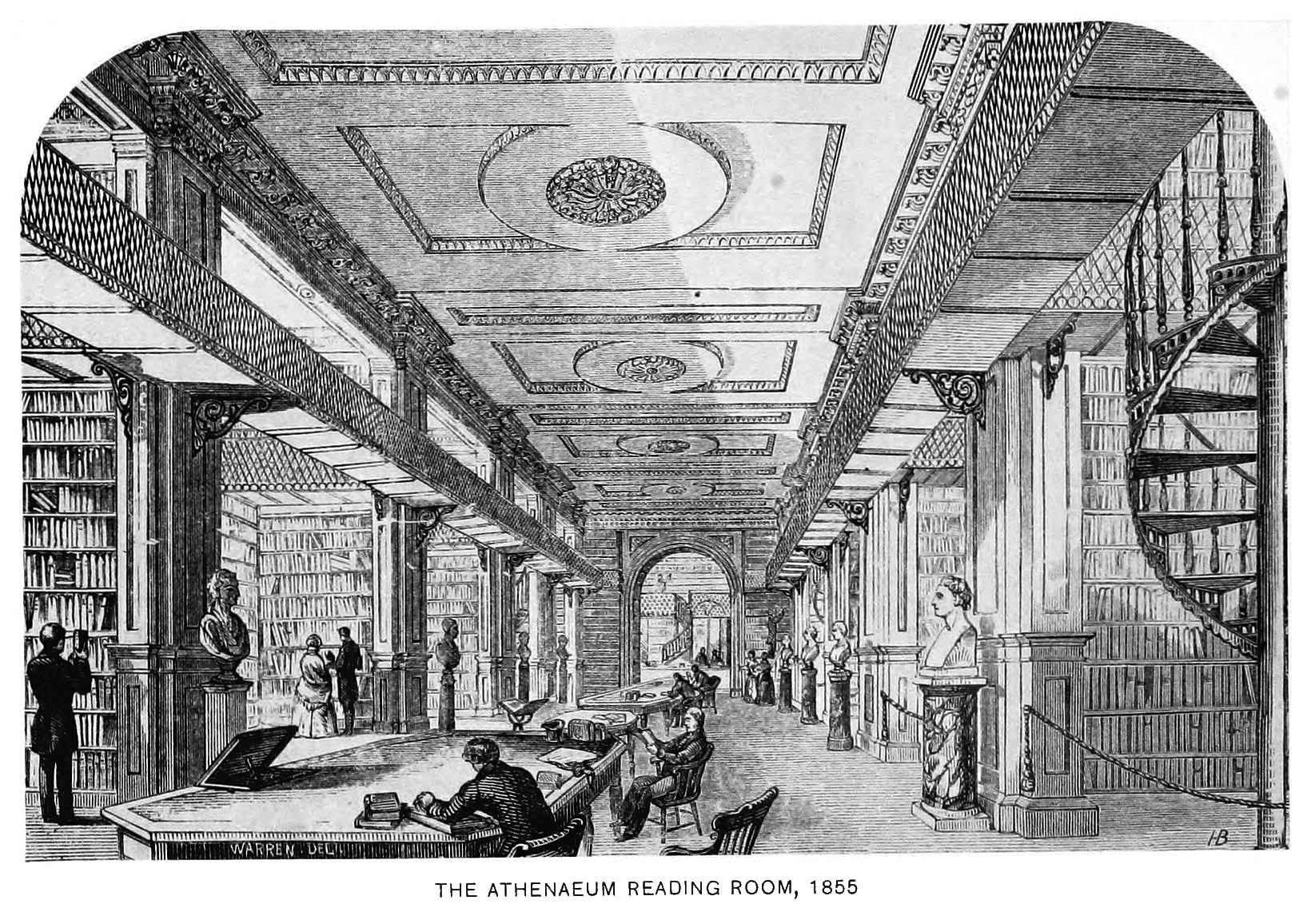
Interior, 1855

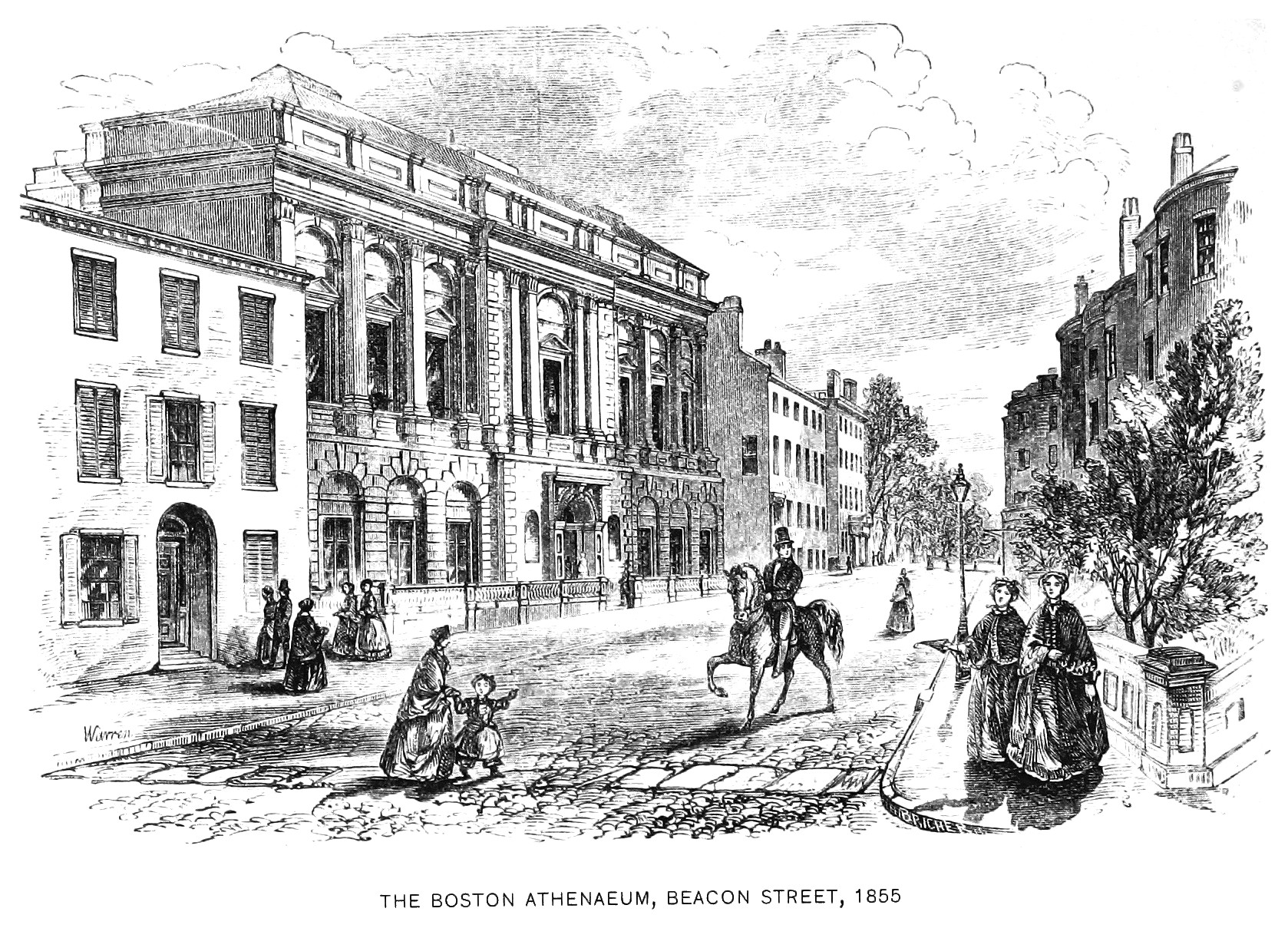
Boston Athenaeum, Beacon Street, c. 1855

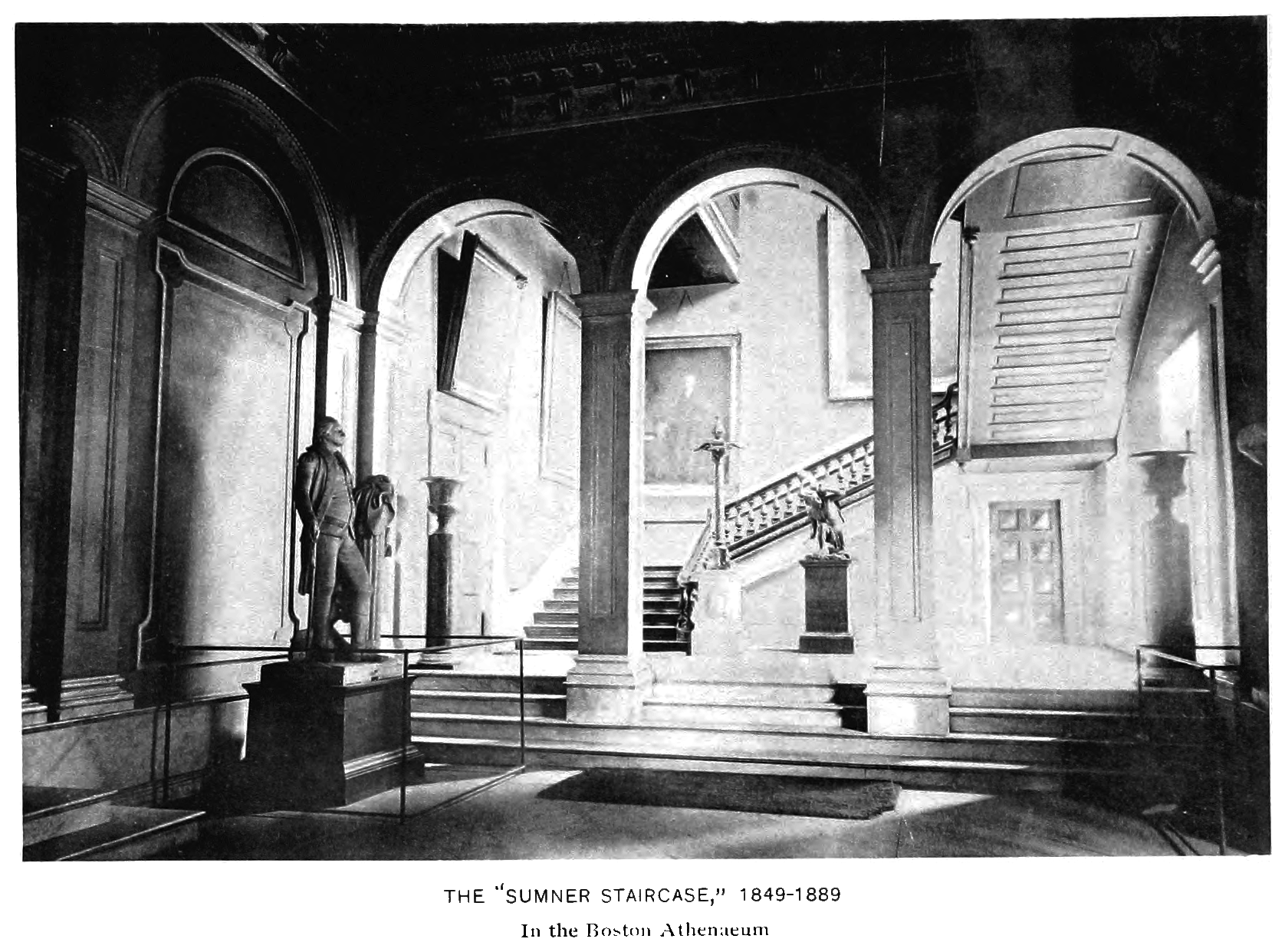
Sumner staircase, c. 1880s

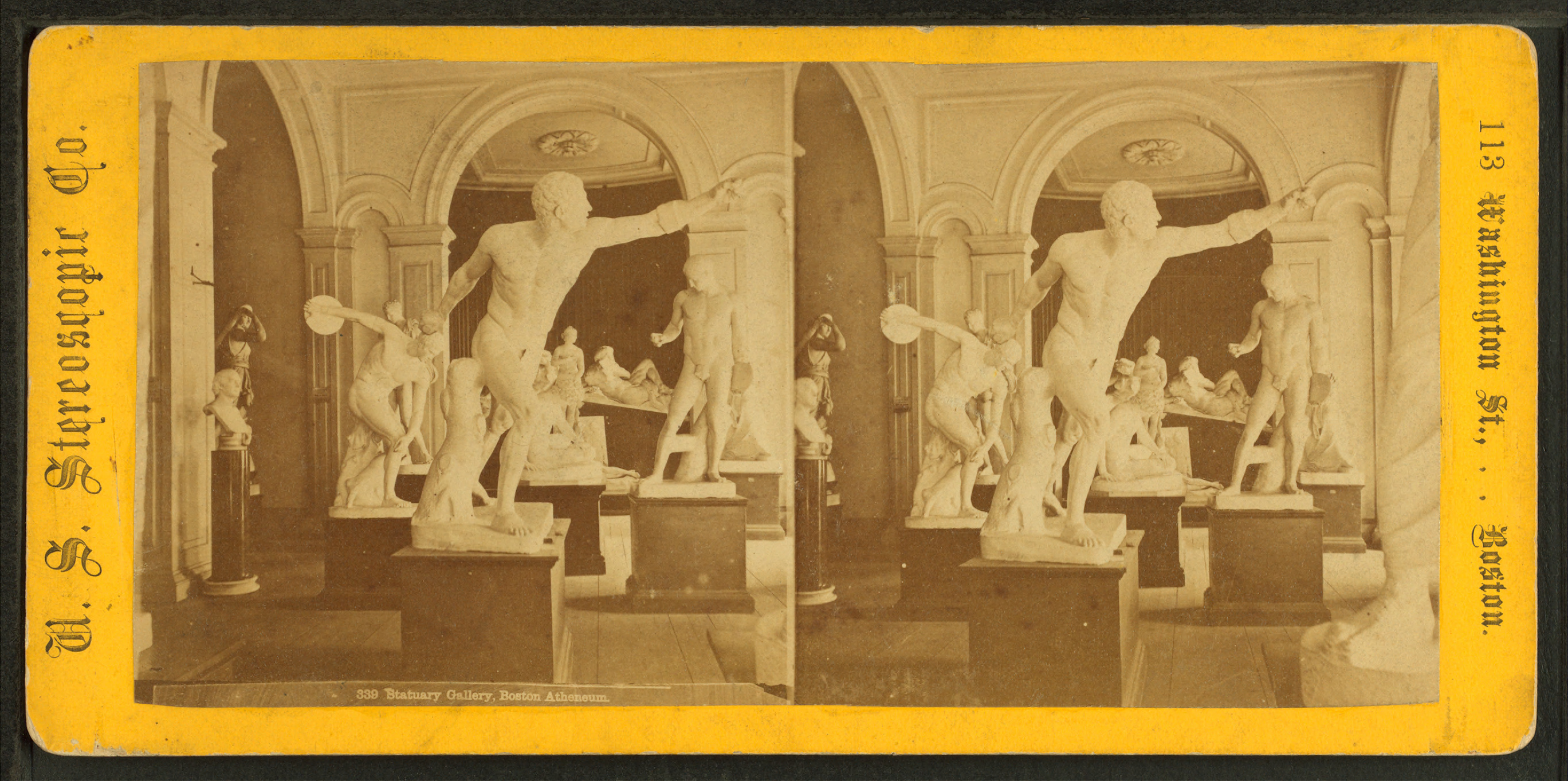
Statuary gallery, 19th century

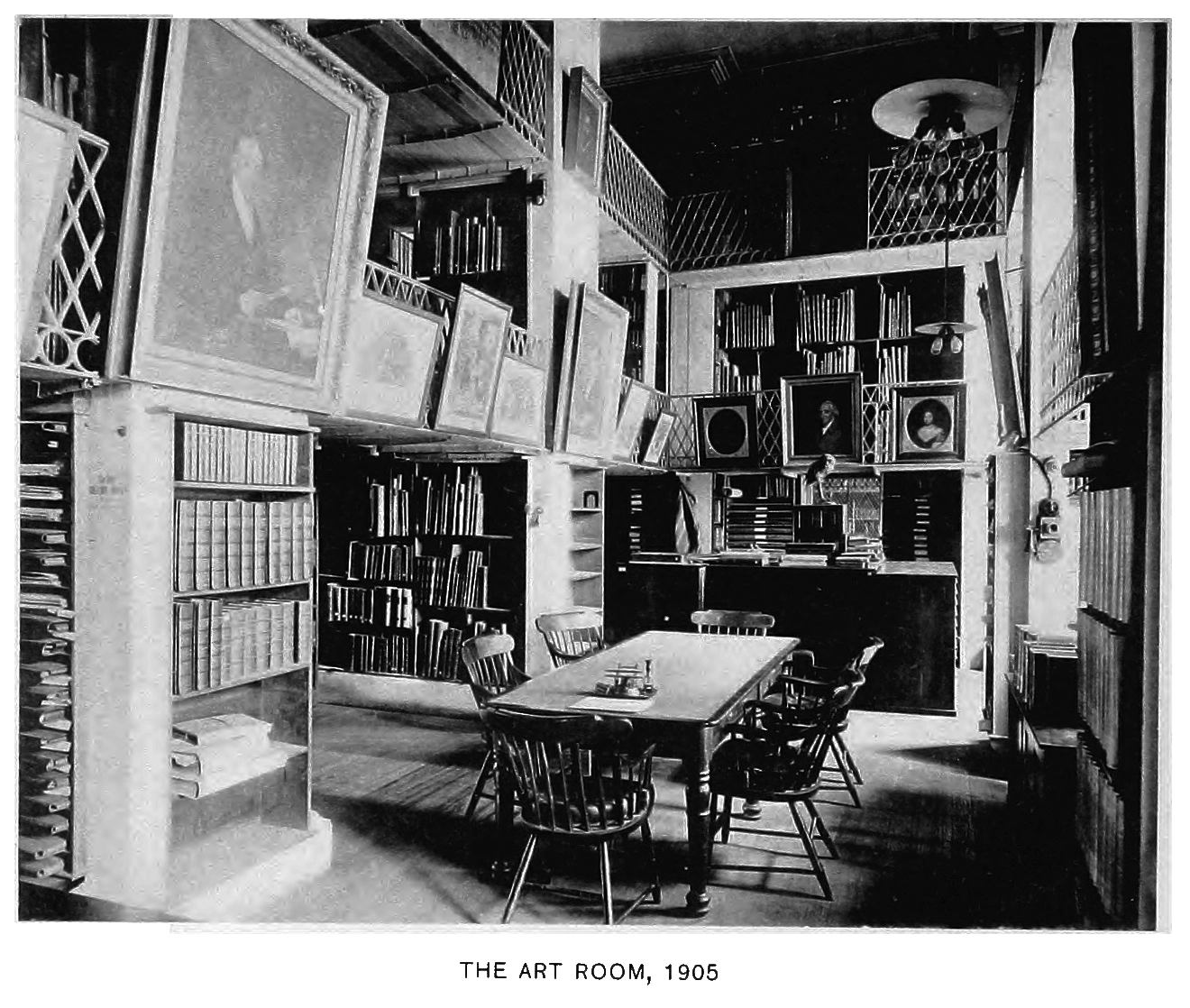
1905

== In popular culture ==
- In the 1998 film A Civil Action, the Boston Athenaeum is used as a stand-in for the Harvard Club of New York City.

== See also ==
- List of National Historic Landmarks in Boston
- National Register of Historic Places listings in northern Boston, Massachusetts
