= John Stickney =

American composer

John Stickney, born in Stoughton, Massachusetts in 1742, died in South Hadley, Massachusetts in 1826, was one of the first American composers. He published "The Gentlemen and Ladies' Musical Companion" (Newburyport, 1774), a collection of psalms and anthems, and rules to learn singing.
