= Joseph Hilton Smyth =

American novelist

Joseph Hilton Smyth (4 December 1901 – 1972) was an American publisher and pulp author. He and two associates, Walker Gray Matheson and Irvine Harvey Williams, in connection with their publishing activities, were convicted in 1942 for acting as agents for the Japanese government without registering with the State Department.

== Publishing ==
In 1940 he and his associates acquired a number of magazines, using $125,000 funds supplied by the Japanese government. The agreement was to publish pro-Japanese stories. After the three were convicted of being unregistered agents for the Japanese government, the titles ceased, though at least one (North American Review) was later revived.

In the 1960s he was co-publisher of the Saturday Review of Literature.

== Novels ==
- President's Agent (1963) writing as Joseph Hilton
- Angels in the Gutter (1955) writing as Joseph Hilton

In addition to novels, Smith also published an autobiography, To Nowhere and Return, prior to his conviction.
