= Munroe & Francis =

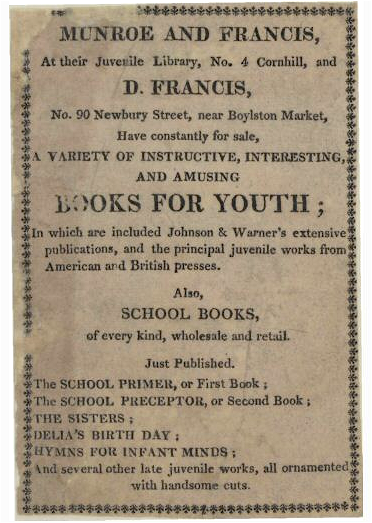

Munroe & Francis was a publishing firm in Boston, Massachusetts, in the early 19th-century. Established by David Francis (1779–1853) and Edmund Monroe, the business operated from offices on Court Street (c. 1805–1807) and Washington Street (c. 1823–1832). In the 19th century the firm expanded to include Samuel H. Parker as partner, and was called Munroe, Francis & Parker until 1810. In 1802–1804 Munroe & Francis issued the first Boston edition of William Shakespeare's works.

== Works issued by the firm ==
- William Shakespeare (1802). Dramatick Works of William Shakespeare.
- Monthly Anthology, c. 1804–1807.
- Boston Directory. Edward Cotton, printed by Munroe & Francis. 1807.
- Mother Goose, 1824
- Robert Roberts (1827). The House Servant's Directory: A Monitor for Private Families. (1828 ed.)
- Trade list of books; published by Munroe and Francis, Boston and Charles S. Francis, New York, 1832
