= John Perkins Cushing =

American sea merchant, opium smuggler and philanthropist

- Born: April 22, 1787; Boston, Massachusetts
- Died: April 12, 1862 (aged 74); Belmont, Massachusetts
- Spouse: Mary Louisa Gardiner (1830–1862)
- Children: 5, including Thomas
- Parent(s): Robert Cushing; Ann Perkins Maynard
- Relatives: John S. J. Gardiner (father-in-law)

John Perkins Cushing (April 22, 1787 – April 12, 1862), called "Ku-Shing" by the Chinese, was a wealthy American sea merchant, opium smuggler, and philanthropist. His sixty-foot pilot schooner, the Sylph, won the first recorded American yacht race in 1832. The town of Belmont, Massachusetts is named after his estate.

== Early life ==
Cushing was born in Boston, Massachusetts to Robert Cushing and his wife, Ann Perkins Maynard. His father's Cushing ancestor had emigrated to Hingham, Massachusetts, during the early years of the Massachusetts Bay Colony. Cushing's sister, Nancy, later married Henry Higginson (1781-1839).

When his mother died of smallpox, Cushing was raised by his uncle, slave and opium trader Thomas Handasyd Perkins (1764–1854).

Cushing was reportedly very fond of the Perkins family and very often brought them house-warming gifts such as large boxes of the finest available white sugar. He was said to have spent a lot of time at their house, often playing backgammon with William Appleton or Colonel Perkins.

== Career ==
In 1803, at age 16, Cushing sailed for China to become clerk in his uncle's counting house. The head of the firm in China soon fell ill and died at sea. Thus, when Cushing arrived in China, he found himself Perkins & Company's sole agent, remaining there for nearly 30 years.

Cushing was said to have managed the affairs of the firm skillfully and was soon taken into partnership. Under Cushing, the firm of Perkins & Company was formally established in Canton in 1806. They imported and traded rice during a famine in China and during the War of 1812, the family loaned their money out, at an interest rate of 18 percent, to other merchants in Canton. When the fur trade diminished they began searching for a substitute for what had once been the foundation of Boston's China trade. The firm focused on opium and, by the 1820s, Cushing was known as the most influential of all the foreigners in Canton, having struck up a close relationship with the merchant Howqua, who at his death in 1843 was said to be the richest man in the world.

In 1820, Cushing brought on his cousin, Thomas Tunno Forbes, to train for the business. Forbes, however, died in 1827 before assuming control of the firm. Cushing, eager for retirement and lacking a suitable replacement, made arrangements to dissolve Perkins & Company by a consolidation with Russell & Co. in 1830. Russell & Co. had been created by China trader Samuel Russell in 1824. In 1830, Cushing returned to Boston with Eastern manners and manservants.

== Personal life ==
Shortly after his return to Boston in 1830, he married Mary Louisa Gardiner (1799–1862), the only daughter of the Rev. John Sylvester John Gardiner (1765–1830) of Trinity Church, Boston. It was rumored at the time that there was much disappointment among the young ladies of Boston, who, as someone expressed it, "beset him like bumblebees about a lump of sugar." Together, they were the parents of five children, including:

- John Gardiner Cushing (1834–1881), who married Susan Prescott Dexter
- Robert Maynard Cushing (1836–1907), who married Olivia Donaldson Dulany (1839–1906)
- Thomas Forbes Cushing (1838–1902)
- William Howard Cushing (d. 1851), who died aged 11.
- Mary Louisa "Isa" Cushing (1845-1894) married Edward Darley Boit her daughters are shown in the painting The Daughters of Edward Darley Boit

Cushing died in Belmont, Massachusetts on April 12, 1862. His obituary in The New York Times stated that: "He was so noted for his liberality to the poor that their pertinacity drove him from Boston, where he once had his residence."

=== Descendants ===
Through his eldest son, he was the grandfather of Alice Linzee Cushing (1869–1947). Through his son, Robert, he was the grandfather of Grafton Dulany Cushing (1864–1939), Howard Gardiner Cushing (1869–1916), Olivia Cushing Andersen (1871–1917). His great-grandson was Alexander Cochrane Cushing (1914–2006).

=== Residence ===
Cushing built himself a handsome mansion on Summer Street, acquired a splendid 200-acre (0.81 km^{2}) estate in Watertown named "Bellmont" (now part of Belmont, Massachusetts which is named after his estate), and erected one of the finest conservatories in New England. His house was one of the finest and most comfortable of any in or near Boston. It was a double one-—a house within a house-—and thus warm in winter and cool in summer. Its spacious grounds and beautiful gardens were open to the public, and thousands of visitors went out there each year.

== See also ==
- Maritime Fur Trade
