= North American Review =

First literary magazine in the United States

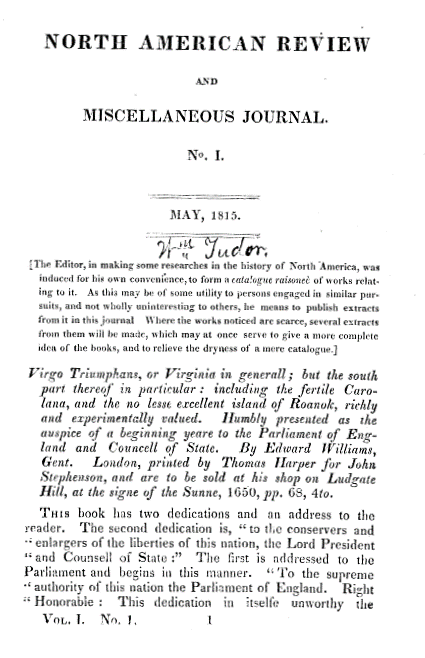
- Editors-in-chief: Rachel Morgan, J. D. Schraffenberger, Grant Tracey, Brooke Wonders, Emily Stowe
- Categories: Literary magazine
- Frequency: Triannual
- Publisher: University of Northern Iowa
- First issue: 1815; 211 years ago
- Country: United States
- Language: English
- Website: northamericanreview.org
- ISSN: 0029-2397
- OCLC: 1099094537

The North American Review (NAR) was the first literary magazine in the United States. It was founded in Boston in 1815 by the poet William Tudor with the assistance of journalist Nathan Hale and others. It was published continuously until 1940, after which it was inactive until revived at Cornell College in Iowa under Robert Dana in 1964. Since 1968, the University of Northern Iowa in Cedar Falls has been home to the publication. Nineteenth-century archives are freely available via Cornell University's Making of America.

== History ==
NAR's first editor, William Tudor, and other founders had been members of Boston's Anthology Club, and launched North American Review to foster a genuine American culture. In its first few years NAR published poetry, fiction, and miscellaneous essays on a bimonthly schedule, but in 1820, it became a quarterly, with more focused contents intent on improving society and on elevating culture. NAR promoted the improvement of public education and administration, with reforms in secondary schools, sound professional training of doctors and lawyers, rehabilitation of prisoners at the state penitentiary, and government by educated experts.

NAR's editors and contributors included several literary and political New Englanders as John Adams, George Bancroft, Nathaniel Bowditch, William Cullen Bryant, Lewis Cass, Edward T. Channing, Caleb Cushing, Richard Henry Dana Sr., Alexander Hill Everett, Edward Everett, John Lothrop Motley, Jared Sparks, George Ticknor, Gulian C. Verplanck, and Daniel Webster.

Between 1862 and 1872, its co-editors were James Russell Lowell and Charles Eliot Norton. Henry Adams also later served as an editor. Although the Review did not often publish fiction, it serialized The Ambassadors by Henry James.

In 1876, Allen Thorndike Rice purchased NAR for $3000 and made himself the editor. He continued as editor until his unexpected death in 1889; he left the magazine to Lloyd Bryce in his will. Bryce was the owner and editor from 1889 to 1896. In 1899, George Harvey (former managing editor of the New York World) purchased NAR, made himself editor and kept control until 1926, except for 1921–1924, when he was United States Ambassador to the United Kingdom. In Fall 1926, NAR was sold to Walter Butler Mahony. Joseph Hilton Smyth purchased NAR from Mahony in September 1938, but publication was suspended in 1940, when Smyth was found to be a Japanese spy, pleading guilty in 1942 to receiving $125,000 from 1938 to 1941 to establish or buy publications for the purpose of spreading Japanese propaganda.

Poet Robert Dana rescued NAR in 1964, resuming its operation and serving as editor-in-chief from 1964 to 1968. During these years, NAR was based at Cornell College, where Dana taught at the time. To revive NAR, Dana successfully negotiated arrangements with Claiborne Pell, at the time Senator from Rhode Island, who asserted that he had the rights to the magazine.

NAR was moved to the University of Northern Iowa from Cornell College in 1968 under the editor Robley Wilson. Since then, its literary contributors have included Lee K. Abbott, Margaret Atwood, Marvin Bell, Vance Bourjaily, Raymond Carver, Eldridge Cleaver, Guy Davenport, Gary Gildner, David Hellerstein, George V. Higgins, Donald Justice, Yosef Komunyakaa, Barry Lopez, Jack Miles, Joyce Carol Oates, David Rabe, Lynne Sharon Schwartz, Anthony Storr, Kurt Vonnegut, and many others. Grant Tracey and Vince Gotera were co-editors from 2000 to 2016. The North American Review Press imprint started publishing books in 2006. Since 2017, the magazine's editors are Rachel Morgan, J. D. Schraffenberger, and Grant Tracey. The managing editor is Emily Stowe.

In 2015 it celebrated the bicentennial of its founding with a conference in Cedar Falls, and April 19–21, 2019, the magazine hosted another conference to celebrate fifty years on the University of Northern Iowa campus.

== North American Review Press ==
The North American Review Press is the publishing arm of the North American Review. They have published six books since 2006, when the press was formally established. Prior to the creation of the North American Review Press imprint, books were published under the name of the magazine. Those books were published during the editorship of Robley Wilson. The North American Review has published fifteen books in total from 1975 to 2021. Types of books that the NAR Press has released is poetry, short stories, collections from past magazine issues, and crime fiction.

== Prizes ==
=== James Hearst Poetry Prize ===
Established to honor James Hearst—a celebrated poet and longtime professor at the University of Northern Iowa—the prize recognizes exceptional previously unpublished poetry. The prize is valued is $1,000.

=== Terry Tempest Williams Creative Nonfiction Prize ===
Named after renowned environmental writer and activist Terry Tempest Williams, the prize honors exceptional works of creative nonfiction that demonstrate literary excellence and innovation. The prize is valued is $1,000.

=== Kurt Vonnegut Speculative Fiction Prize ===
Established to honor the legacy of Kurt Vonnegut, the prize celebrates outstanding works of speculative fiction that embody the "wit, irreverence, humanity, and stylistic daring characteristic" of Vonnegut's writing. The prize is valued is $1,000.

== Recognition ==
In the last twenty years of the old millennium, North American Review won the National Magazine Award for Fiction twice and was a finalist for that award five times; placed stories in the annual O. Henry anthologies four times, in the Pushcart Prize annuals nine times, in Best American Short Stories eight times, in Best American Sports Writing and Best American Travel Writing. As for graphics, illustrations from NAR have been chosen for inclusion in the Communication Arts' Annuals, the Society of Publication Designers' Annual, Print's Regional Design Annuals, the Society of Illustrators exhibitions, and have twice won the Eddie and Ozzie Award for best cover among consumer magazines with a circulation of less than 100,000.
