= Monthly Anthology =

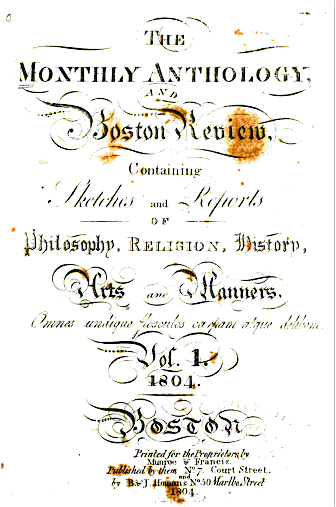
Monthly Anthology, v.1, 1804. Printed by Munroe & Francis, Boston

The Monthly Anthology and Boston Review was a miscellaneous magazine published by the Anthology Club of Boston, Massachusetts, from 1804 to 1811. The more famous North American Review is generally considered to be its successor.

Oliver Wendell Holmes describes the magazine thus, in his disquisition on Ralph Waldo Emerson: "The Anthology was the literary precursor of the North American Review, and the theological herald of the Christian Examiner. Like all first beginnings it showed many marks of immaturity. It mingled extracts and original contributions, theology and medicine, with all manner of literary chips and shavings. It had Magazine ways that smacked of Sylvanus Urban; leading articles with balanced paragraphs which recalled the marching tramp of Johnson; translations that might have been signed with the name of Creech, and Odes to Sensibility, and the like, which recalled the syrupy sweetness and languid trickle of Laura Matilda's sentimentalities. It talked about 'the London Reviewers' with a kind of provincial deference. It printed articles with quite too much of the license of Swift and Prior for the Magazines of to-day. But it had opinions of its own, and would compare well enough with The Gentleman's Magazine....""

== Publication history ==
- Monthly Anthology v. 1, 1804 (Boston: Munroe & Francis)
- Monthly Anthology v. 2, 1805 (Boston: Munroe & Francis)
- Monthly Anthology v. 3, 1806 (Boston: Munroe & Francis)
- Monthly Anthology v. 4, 1807 (Boston: Munroe & Francis)
- Monthly Anthology v. 5, 1808 (Boston: Snelling & Simons; and Hastings, Etheridge & Bliss)
- Monthly Anthology v. 6, 1809 (Boston: Hastings, Etheridge & Bliss)
- Monthly Anthology v. 7, 1809 (Boston: T. B. Wait & Co.)
- Monthly Anthology v. 8, 1810 (Boston: T. B. Wait & Co.)
- Monthly Anthology v. 9, 1810 (Boston: T. B. Wait & Co.)
- Monthly Anthology v.10, 1811 (Boston: T. B. Wait & Co.)
