= Frank J. Donahue =

American politician and judge (1881–1979)

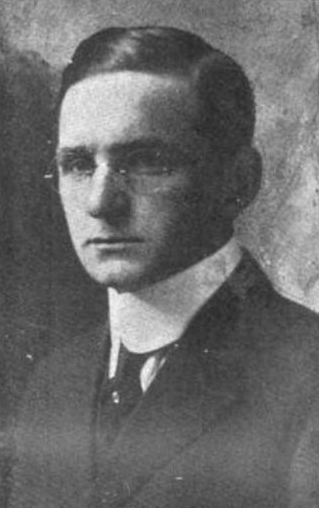

18th Massachusetts Secretary of the Commonwealth
- In office 1913–1915
- Preceded by: Albert P. Langtry
- Succeeded by: Albert P. Langtry

Chairperson of the Massachusetts Democratic Party
- In office 1928–1932
- Preceded by: Charles H. McGlue
- Succeeded by: Joseph A. Maynard

Associate Justice of the Massachusetts Superior Court
- In office 1932–1973
- Nominated by: Joseph B. Ely
- Preceded by: Charles Donahue
- Succeeded by: Roger J. Donahue

Personal details
- Born: Frank Joseph Donahue; August 2, 1881 Needham, Massachusetts
- Died: August 24, 1979 (aged 98) Boston, Massachusetts
- Party: Democratic
- Spouse: Alice Lovely (m. 1907; died 1961)
- Children: 3
- Education: Massachusetts College of Pharmacy; Suffolk Law School
- Profession: Pharmacist; Journalist

Frank Joseph Donahue (August 2, 1881 – August 24, 1979) was an American politician who served as the Massachusetts Secretary of the Commonwealth, Chairman of the Massachusetts Democratic State Committee, and as an associate justice of the Massachusetts Superior Court. He was the first Democrat to serve as Secretary of the Commonwealth.

== Early life ==
Donahue was born in Needham, Massachusetts on August 2, 1881. He attended the Needham public schools, The English High School, and the Massachusetts College of Pharmacy. He became a registered druggist at the age of 19.

After contributing opinion pieces to the Needham weekly newspaper, Donahue gave up being a pharmacist to become a newspaper writer. He joined the staff of the Boston American when the paper was formed in 1904. In 1907, he became the city hall reporter for the Boston Daily Tribune. He was later transferred to the state house. He also served as managing editor of Practical Politics, a political magazine.

Donahue's first political involvement came with the Needham Democratic committee. He was elected to the Needham park commission at the age of 21 and was secretary of the board from 1903 to 1905. He was an unsuccessful candidate for the state legislature, winning in his hometown, but losing in the district's other towns.

== Personal life ==
In 1907, Donahue married Alice Lovely of Newton, Massachusetts. That same year, he moved to Boston to further his career in journalism. They had three sons – Frank Jr., Roger, and Malcolm. Alice Donahue died in 1961.

== Secretary of the Commonwealth ==
Donahue was the Democratic Party's nominee for Secretary of the Commonwealth in the 1911 legislative election to fill the vacancy caused by the death of William M. Olin. The Republicans had a majority in the legislature and elected their candidate, Albert P. Langtry.

Donahue was a Democratic for the Secretary of the Commonwealth candidate in the 1911 election. He defeated the state committee's favored candidate, Edward O. Skelton, in the party primary, by nearly 44,000 votes. He lost the general election to Langtry 206,968 votes to 178,530.

Donahue won the Democratic nomination in 1912 without opposition. Before the election, the Progressive Party split from the Republican Party. The Republican vote was split between the Republicans and Progressives. Donahue defeated Langtry by a plurality of 4,576 votes.
42,642 (1913)

In the 1913 election, the Progressives and Republicans again nominated candidates for Secretary of the Commonwealth. Donahue was reelected by a 42,642 plurality.

In 1914, Langtry defeated Donahue, 200,549 votes to 189,889. The Progressive nominee, Russell A. Wood, received only 31,778 votes.

== Post-secretary career ==
On December 9, 1914, Donahue was appointed to the Massachusetts Industrial Accident Board by Governor David I. Walsh. The appointment was immediately confirmed by the Massachusetts Governor's Council and he took office on January 20, 1915. He was reappointed by three Republican governors.

Donahue read law and was admitted to the bar in 1918. He graduated from Suffolk Law School in 1921.

On July 21, 1928, Donahue was elected chairman of the Democratic state committee with little opposition. Clarence A. Barnes, a Republican candidate for attorney general, called Donahue's continued service on the nonpartisan accident board while serving as state party chairman improper and demanded his resignation. Republican governor Alvan T. Fuller, disagreed and did not place any pressure on Donahue to resign. Donahue resigned in September 1928, but did not give a reason for his departure.

In 1931, Governor Joseph B. Ely appointed Donahue chairman of the Fall River board of commissioners, which was tasked with overseeing the financial affairs of the city until 1941. He resigned unexpectedly on February 10, 1932.

On January 3, 1932, Donahue was elected to fill the unexpired term of Massachusetts' Democratic national committee, Edward W. Quinn, who died the previous year. He was unable to attend the state committee meeting where he was elected due to illness. He was taken to Trumbull Hospital in Brookline, Massachusetts that evening and was reported to be in serious condition. He was released from the hospital on January 27.

== Massachusetts Superior Court ==
In 1932, Ely appointed Donahue to fill the vacancy on the Massachusetts Superior Court caused by Charles Donahue's elevation to the Massachusetts Supreme Judicial Court. From 1938 to 1958, Donahue was chairman of the Judicial Council. He continued to serve on the Superior Court until the Constitutional Amendment of 1973 forced him to retire. He was succeeded by his son, Roger J. Donahue.

== Death ==
Donahue died on August 24, 1979 at New England Baptist Hospital. He was 98 years old.

Political offices
Preceded by Albert P. Langtry	18th Massachusetts Secretary of the Commonwealth; 1913–1915	Succeeded by Albert P. Langtry
Party political offices
Preceded by Charles J. Martell	Democratic nominee for Secretary of the Commonwealth of Massachusetts; 1911 (legislative), 1911, 1912, 1913, 1914	Succeeded by Edwin A. Grosvenor
Preceded by Charles H. McGlue	Chairman of the Massachusetts Democratic State Committee; 1928–1932	Succeeded by Joseph A. Maynard
Legal offices
Preceded by Charles Donahue	Associate Justice of the Massachusetts Superior Court; 1932–1974	Succeeded by Roger J. Donahue
