= Senator Donovan =

Senator Donovan may refer to:

- Edward J. Donovan (1864–1908), Massachusetts State Senate
- James Donovan (Boston politician) (1859–1929), New York State Senate
- James G. Donovan (1898–1987), New York State Senate
- James H. Donovan (1923–1990), New York State Senate
- Jeremiah Donovan (1857–1935), Connecticut State Senate
- John A. K. Donovan (1907–1993), Virginia State Senate
- John J. Donovan Jr. (1913–1955), Connecticut State Senate
- Kerry Donovan (born 1978/79), Colorado State Senate
- Leslie Donovan (born 1936), Kansas State Senate
