= Henry S. Dewey =

American politician (1856–1932)

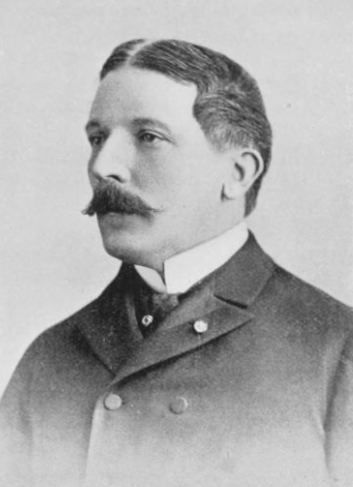

Associate Justice of the Boston Municipal Court
- In office 1899–1902

Special Justice of the Boston Municipal Court
- In office 1899–1896

Member of the Massachusetts House of Representatives
- In office 1889–1891

Member of the Boston Common Council
- In office 1885–1888

Personal details
- Born: Henry Sweetser Dewey; November 9, 1856 Hanover, New Hampshire
- Died: May 12, 1932 (aged 75) Boston, Massachusetts
- Party: Republican
- Education: Dartmouth College; Boston University
- Occupation: Jurist, politician

Henry Sweetser Dewey (1856–1932) was an American jurist and politician who served as a judge of the Boston Municipal Court and Judge Advocate General of Massachusetts.

== Early life ==
Dewey was born on November 9, 1856, in Hanover, New Hampshire, to Major General Israel Dewey and Susan Augusta (Sweetser) Dewey. He was a second cousin of Admiral George Dewey. He grew up near military posts in the western and southwestern parts of the United States. He received his Bachelor of Arts degree from Dartmouth College in 1878 and his Master of Arts degree from Dartmouth in 1879. While at Dartmouth he served as a paymaster's clerk in the United States Army.

In 1879 the Army transferred Dewey to Boston. He resided at the Norfolk House in Roxbury, Boston with his mother, brother, and sister until 1903 when he moved to a new home in Back Bay. Dewey left the Army in 1880 and proceeded to read law in the office of Ambrose Ranney. In 1882 he earned his Bachelor of Laws degree from Boston University and was admitted to the bar. From June 11, 1880, to February 26, 1889, he was judge advocate general on the staff of the 1st Brigade of the Massachusetts Volunteer Militia.

== Politics ==
On September 29, 1885, Dewey was elected to the Boston Common Council in a special election caused by the resignation of William M. Osborne. He was reelected in 1885, 1886, and 1887. From 1889 to 1891 he was a member of the Massachusetts House of Representatives.

== Legal career ==
In 1891, Dewey was made a member of the Suffolk County Board of Bar Examiners. In 1895 he was named chairman of the board. In 1897 he was appointed to a five-year term as a member of the Massachusetts Board of Bar Examiners.

In 1896 he was appointed as a special justice for the Boston Municipal Court. In 1899 he was made an associate justice of the Boston Municipal Court. Dewey was known for being outspoken on the bench as well as sympathetic towards defendants. Police officers were known to not seek search warrants from him because Dewey would ask them after the search if they had found anything. Dewey was especially sympathetic towards people arrested for drunkenness, as he viewed alcoholism as more of an illness than a crime. In 1902, The Boston Daily Globe called Dewey "the best-known and most interesting man in [Boston]". On December 10, 1902, Dewey resigned from the bench to return to private practice.

On January 4, 1900, he joined the military staff of Governor Winthrop M. Crane as Judge Advocate General. He was retained by Crane's successor, John L. Bates. In 1904, Democrat William Lewis Douglas defeated Bates and chose to remove all of Bates' staff, including Dewey.

== Run for mayor ==
In 1905, Dewey ran for mayor of Boston. He faced Speaker of the Massachusetts House of Representatives Louis A. Frothingham and state senator Edward B. Callender in a three way Republican primary. Frothingham was declared the winner over Dewey by 275 votes. After a recount, this number was reduced to 249. On November 21, Dewey announced that he would run as an independent. He finished third behind Democrat John F. Fitzgerald and Frothingham with 12.5% of the vote.

== Commitment ==
In 1909, Dewey announced that he was running as a "theocratic candidate for governor". On October 3, he made a 12-hour speech on Boston Common regarding his political theories. Massachusetts Secretary of the Commonwealth William M. Olin found Dewey's nomination papers to not be in legal form and he was not placed on the ballot.

In 1909, Dewey filed a $76 million libel suit against the executive committee of the Good Government Association (Laurence Minot, Eliot N. Jones, John Mason Little, George R. Nutter, and Nathaniel Thayer III) for statements made during his mayoral campaign. On June 9, the jury decided in favor of the defendants after only 35 minutes of deliberation. Following his legal defeat, Dewey tried to have writs of replevin issued against almost every criminal and superior court judge as well as Governor Eugene Foss, Lieutenant Governor Frothingham, Mayor Fitzgerald, Speaker of the Massachusetts House of Representatives Joseph H. Walker, Massachusetts Attorney General James M. Swift, State Treasurer Elmer A. Stevens, Secretary of the Commonwealth Albert P. Langtry, and Suffolk County District Attorney Joseph C. Pelletier. He also tried to have arrest warrants issued against a number of religious and public figures, including Foss, Swift, Langtry, Fitzgerald, Pelletier, Cardinal William Henry O'Connell, Bishops William Lawrence and Alexander Hamilton Vinton, Police Commissioner Stephen O'Meara, and attorney Henry F. Hurlburt.

On February 9, 1912, Dewey was found to be mentally ill and was committed to Boston State Hospital by Judge Robert Grant. He remained there until his death on May 12, 1932.
