= Edgett =

Edgett is a surname. Notable people with the surname include:

- Bob Edgett (1930–2011), Canadian boxer and amateur boxing coach
- Charles Edgar Edgett (1881–1947), Canadian police officer
- Isaac H. Edgett (1838–1917), American civil servant and politician
