= John Priest =

John Priest may refer to:

- John W. Priest (died 1859), American architect
- John G. Priest (1822–1900), businessman and social and civic leader in St. Louis, Missouri
- John T. Priest, American public servant
- Johnny Priest (1891–1979), Major League Baseball infielder
