= 1905 Boston mayoral election =

Election in Massachusetts, United States

- December 12, 1905
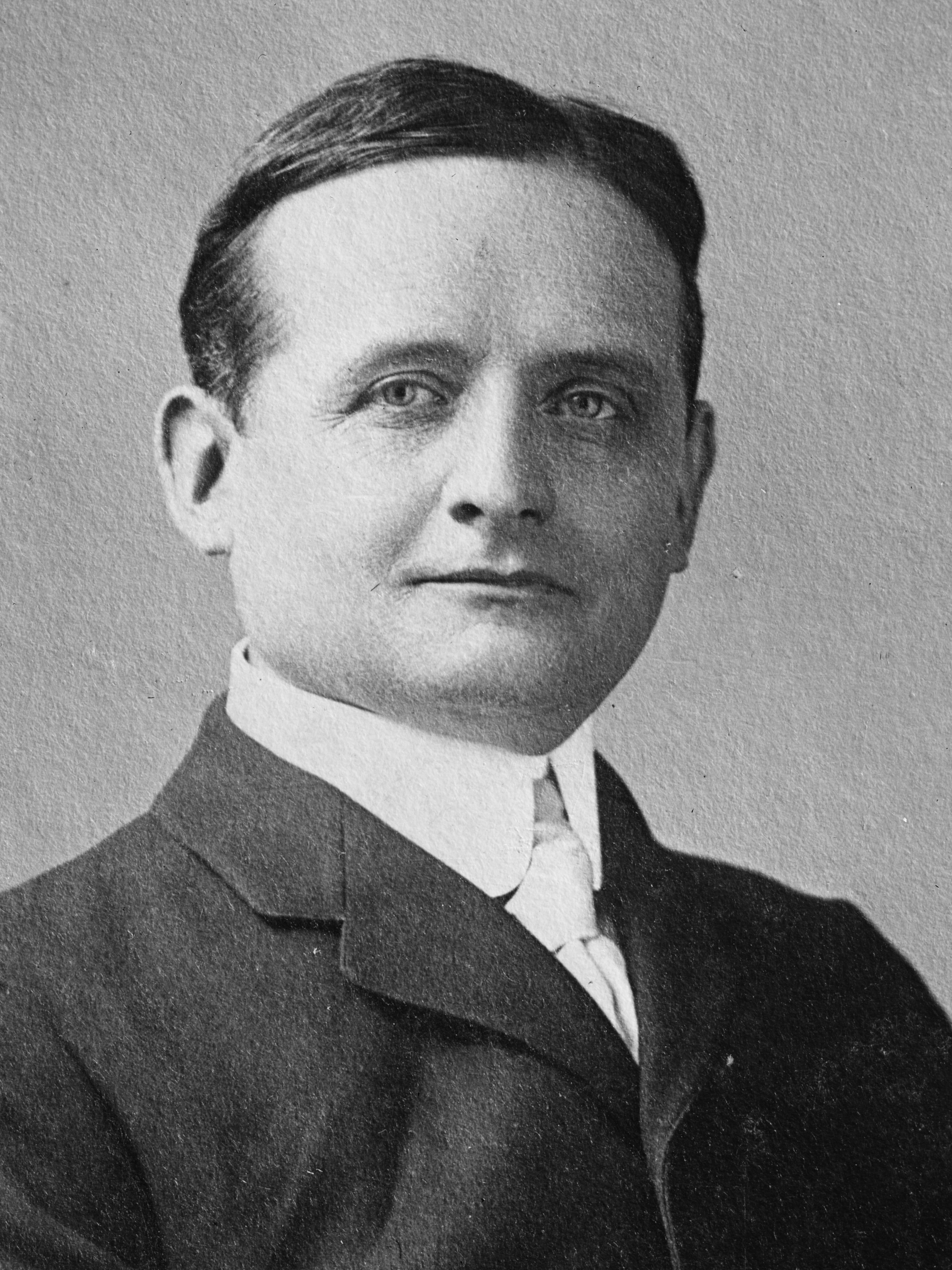

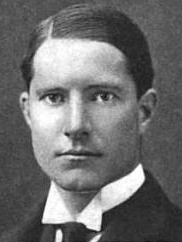

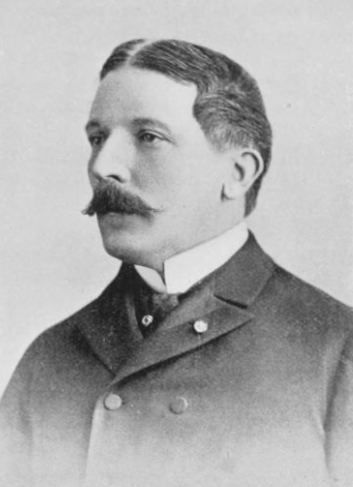
Candidate	John F. Fitzgerald	Louis A. Frothingham	Henry S. Dewey
Party	Democratic	Republican	Populist
Popular vote	44,171	36,028	11,608
Percentage	47.5%	38.7%	12.5%
Mayor before election
Daniel A. Whelton
Democratic
Elected mayor
John F. Fitzgerald
Democratic

The Boston mayoral election of 1905 took place on Tuesday, December 12, 1905. Democratic nominee John F. Fitzgerald defeated Republican nominee Louis A. Frothingham and four other contenders to win election to his first term as Mayor of Boston. Ahead of the general election, primary elections had been held on Thursday, November 16, 1905.

Daniel A. Whelton, who had become acting mayor upon the death of Mayor Patrick Collins in September 1905, did not run for the position.

Fitzgerald was inaugurated on Monday, January 1, 1906.

== Results ==
=== Democratic primary ===
- Edward J. Donovan, Boston City Clerk
- John F. Fitzgerald, former member of the United States House of Representatives (1895–1901) and the Massachusetts Senate (1892–1894)

Candidates	Primary Election	
Candidates	Votes	%
John F. Fitzgerald	28,130	53.6%
Edward J. Donovan	24,387	46.4%
all others	5	0.0%

=== Republican primary ===
- Louis A. Frothingham, Speaker of the Massachusetts House of Representatives
- Henry S. Dewey, former Boston Municipal Court judge
- Edward B. Callender, member of the Massachusetts Senate

Withdrew

- Edward J. Bromberg, Boston Alderman

Candidates	Primary Election	
Candidates	Votes	%
Louis A. Frothingham	9,941	46.6%
Henry S. Dewey	9,745	45.7%
Edward B. Callender	1,653	7.7%
all others	4	0.0%

=== Other candidates ===
- Henry S. Dewey, who had narrowly lost the Republican primary election, ran as People's Party candidate
- Michael D. Fitzgerald, Socialist Labor candidate, was removed from the ballot in early December due to invalid signatures
- George G. Hall, was the Socialist candidate
- James A. Watson, was the Municipal Ownership League candidate

=== General election ===
Candidates		General Election	
Candidates		Votes	%
D	John F. Fitzgerald	44,171	47.5%
R	Louis A. Frothingham	36,028	38.7%
P	Henry S. Dewey	11,608	12.5%
S	George G. Hall	712	0.8%
M	James A. Watson	457	0.5%
Michael D. Fitzgerald		9	0.0%
Scattering		14	0.0%
Total Vote		92,999	100

== See also ==
- List of mayors of Boston, Massachusetts
