= James Donovan (Boston politician) =

American politician (1859–1929)

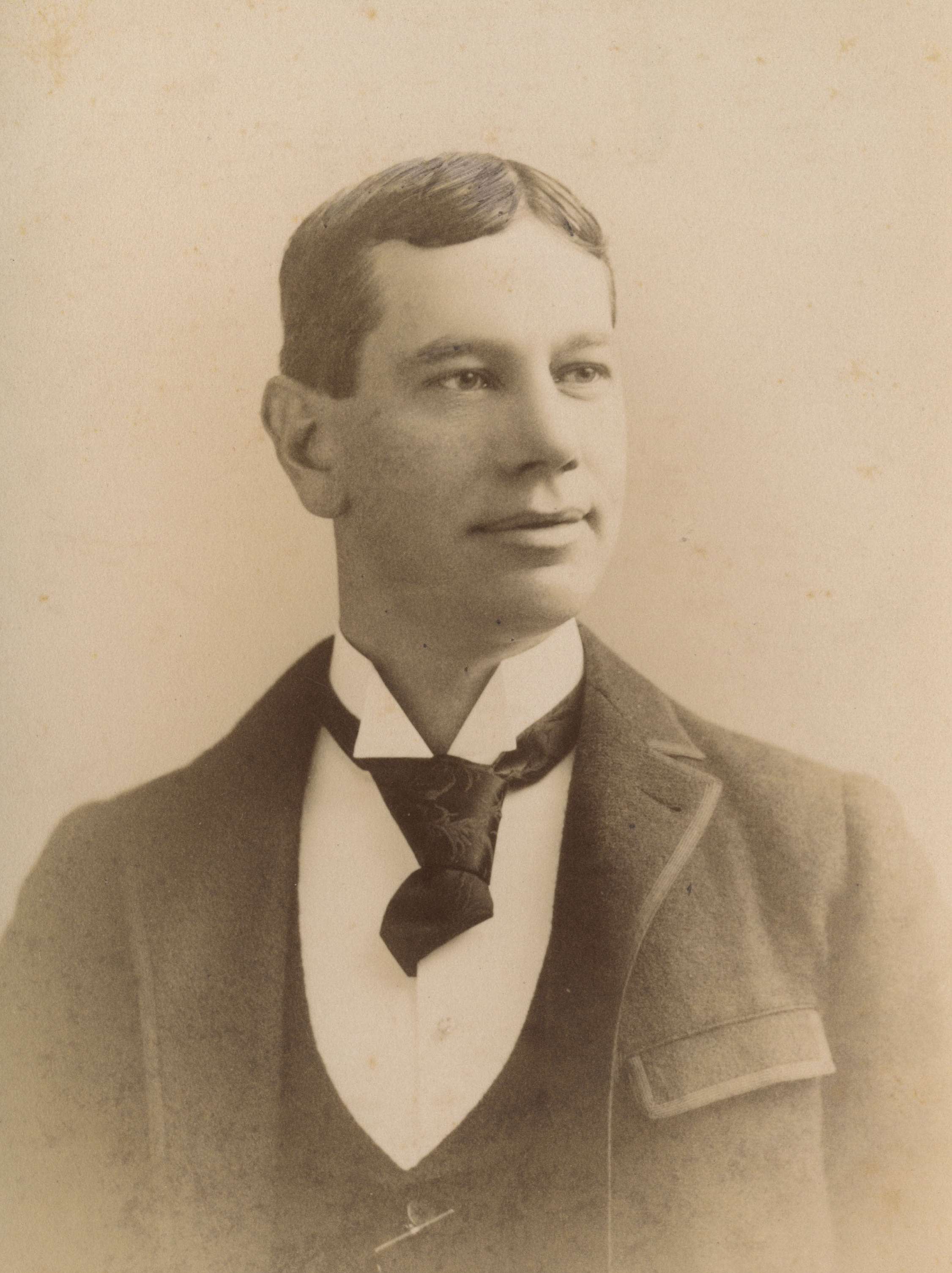

Boston City Clerk
- In office 1912–1928
- Preceded by: John T. Priest
- Succeeded by: Wilfred J. Doyle

Member of the Massachusetts Governor's Council for the 4th District
- In office 1892–1894
- Preceded by: Edward J. Flynn
- Succeeded by: John H. Sullivan

Member of the Massachusetts Senate for the 4th Suffolk District
- In office 1889–1891
- Preceded by: John H. Sullivan
- Succeeded by: P. J. Kennedy

Personal details
- Born: May 28, 1859 Boston, Massachusetts, U.S.
- Died: January 19, 1929 (aged 69) South End, Boston, Massachusetts, U.S.

James Donovan (May 28, 1859 – January 19, 1929) was an American politician who held a number offices in the city of Boston. He served as a member of common council, both houses of the Massachusetts General Court, and the Massachusetts Governor's Council, was superintendent of lamps and streets, and spent 16 years as city clerk.

== Biography ==
Donovan was born on May 28, 1859, in Boston. His father died when Donovan was young and he began working in a provision store at the age of 11. He began campaigning for Democratic candidates in his teens and at the age of 21 became the first ever Democrat elected to represent Ward 16 on the Boston common council. He was defeated for reelection by A. Francis Richard, but contested the election on the grounds of fraud and irregularities on the part of precinct officers. Multiple witnesses testified before a special committee of the common council that they saw wardens in precincts 1, 2, and 3 mark a number of the ballots. The committee found Donovan's name scratched off of 27 ballots in precinct 1 and 11 in precinct 3. On March 8, 1883, four of the five committee members found that there was enough evidence of fraud in precincts 1, 2, and 3 to recommend that the Council declare the seat vacant and hold a new election, while the fifth member, William F. Wharton, dissented because he believed that fraud was only proven in precinct 3 and these 11 ballots would not change the outcome of the election. The council narrowly voted in favor of allowing Richard to retain his seat.

Donovan was a member of the Massachusetts House of Representatives from 1884 to 1888 and represented the Fourth Suffolk District in the Massachusetts Senate from 1889 to 1891. From 1892 to 1894, he was a member of the Massachusetts Governor's Council.

In 1893, Donovan was elected to succeed the deceased John H. McDonough as chairman of the Democratic city committee. He resigned to accept the position of superintendent of lamps, which he held from 1896 to 1900. In 1901 he was unanimously elected to his former position of city committee chairman. He led the Democrats' successful 1901 campaign, which included Patrick Collins' victory in that year's mayoral election. After initially refusing, Donovan accepted Collins' offer to become superintendent of streets. He was unanimously confirmed by the board of aldermen on January 13, 1902. He, along with P. J. Kennedy and Joseph A. Corbett formed Collins' "Kitchen Cabinet". Although Donovan stepped down as city chairman, he continued to lead the Ward 9 (formerly Ward 16) Democratic party while serving as commissioner. He, along with most of the Democratic party machine, endorsed Edward J. Donovan in the 1905 Boston mayoral election. Donovan lost the Democratic primary to John F. Fitzgerald, who went on to win the election. On January 2, 1906, James Donovan resigned as street commissioner.

On January 20, 1906, Donovan married Henrietta Louise Webber in a small ceremony in the rectory of the Cathedral of the Holy Cross. He was the Democratic nominee for sheriff of Suffolk County, Massachusetts, in 1907 but lost to incumbent Fred H. Seavey.

In 1909, Donovan was again elected head of the Democratic city committee. He endorsed James J. Storrow in the nonpartisan 1910 Boston mayoral election.

On April 16, 1912, Donovan was elected city clerk to fill the vacancy caused by the death of John T. Priest. He resigned on November 27, 1928, due to ill health. He died on January 19, 1929, at his home in Boston's South End.

Party political offices
Preceded by John H. McDonough; John H. Lee; William F. McClellan	Chairman of the Boston Democratic City Committee; 1893–1896; 1901–1902; 1909–1910	Succeeded by Joseph J. Corbett; W. T. A. Fitzgerald; Joseph A. Maynard
Political offices
Preceded by John H. Sullivan	Member of the Massachusetts Senate for the 4th Suffolk District; 1889–1891	Succeeded by P. J. Kennedy
Preceded by Edward J. Flynn	Member of the Massachusetts Governor's Council for the 4th District; 1892–1894	Succeeded by John H. Sullivan
Preceded by James Buckner	Boston Superintendent of Lamps; 1896–1900	Succeeded by William D. Lang
Preceded by Bertrand T. Wheeler	Boston Superintendent of Streets; 1902–1906	Succeeded by James H. Doyle
Preceded by John T. Priest	Boston City Clerk; 1912–1928	Succeeded by Wilfred J. Doyle
