= Isaac H. Edgett =

American politician

Acting Massachusetts Secretary of the Commonwealth
- In office April 15, 1911 – April 28, 1911
- Preceded by: William M. Olin
- Succeeded by: Albert P. Langtry

Alderman at Large
- Constituency: Beverly, Massachusetts

Personal details
- Born: March 13, 1838 Hillsborough, New Brunswick, British North America
- Died: March 9, 1917 (aged 78) Beverly, Massachusetts
- Resting place: Central Cemetery, Beverly, Massachusetts
- Party: Republican
- Spouse(s): Elizabeth Boden Fiske, b. April 19, 1841
- Children: Horace Pierce Edgett (March 3, 1866 - 1918); Carrie Cousins Edgett (1870 - 1966); Grace Lawrence Edgett (May 12, 1874 - 1968); Ruth Fiske Edgett (1876 - 1964).
- Profession: Cabinet maker

Military service
- Allegiance: United States of America; Union
- Branch/service: Union Army
- Unit: Twenty-Third Regiment Mass. Vol. Infantry
- Battles/wars: American Civil War

Isaac H. Edgett (March 13, 1838 – March 9, 1917) was an American civil servant and politician who served as the acting Massachusetts Secretary of the Commonwealth.

== Early life ==
Edgett was born in Hillsborough, New Brunswick on March 13, 1838, to Handyside P. and Ruth Edgett. Edgett married Elizabeth Boden Fiske, b. April 19, 1841.

== Military service ==
Edgett joined up with the Twenty-Third Massachusetts Volunteer Infantry early in the American Civil War. He was wounded at the Battle of Cold Harbor. He was mustered out at the end of the war with the rank of captain.

== Massachusetts Secretary of the Commonwealth ==
Edgett, worked as the First Deputy to Secretary of the Commonwealth's office for 37 years, retiring in 1913. As the First Deputy Secretary of the Commonwealth Edgett became the acting Massachusetts Secretary of the Commonwealth upon the death of William M. Olin. Edgett served as the acting Massachusetts Secretary of the Commonwealth until Albert P. Langtry was elected by the Massachusetts legislature to serve out the remainder of Olin's term.

Political offices
Preceded by William M. Olin	Acting Massachusetts Secretary of the Commonwealth; April 15, 1911–April 28, 1911	Succeeded by Albert P. Langtry
