= Reserve Mallet =

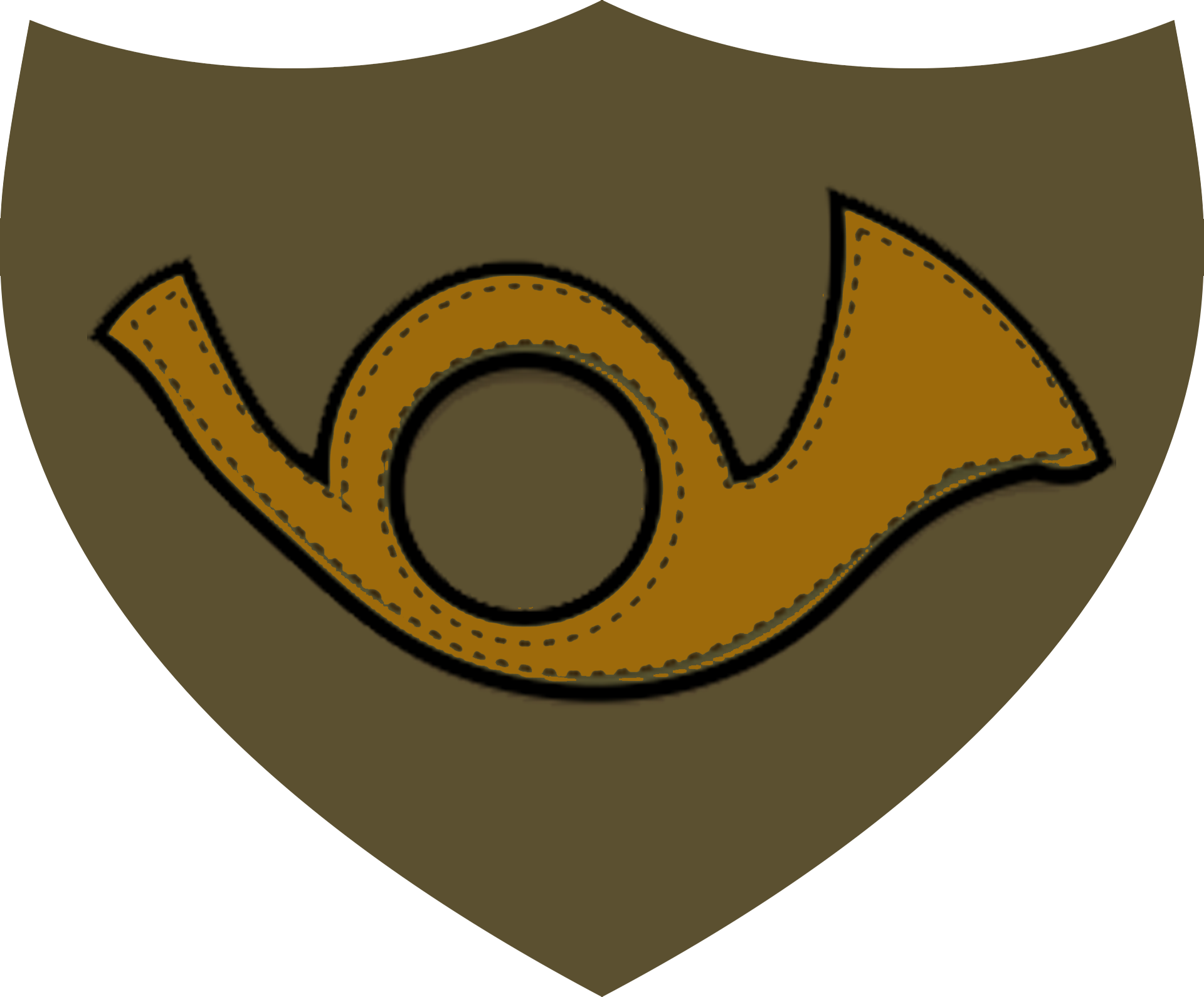

The Reserve Mallet (mah-LAY) (also called Mallet Reserve) was formed out of the American Field Service (AFS) and was named after Major Richard Mallet. Hundreds of American volunteers (mainly college students encouraged by their alma maters) had come to France to drive ambulances for the AFS.

== Origins ==
In April of 1917, Piatt Andrew, the director of the AFS, asked Captain Aimé Doumenc, the commandant of the French Automobile Service what more could the AFS do for the war effort in France. Doumenc stated that that they needed thousands of truck drivers to take supplies and ammunition to the front.

On May 8, 1917 the first section of the Reserve Mallet was organized by the Cornell Ambulance Unit and within four months there were 800 drivers in 14 sections driving supply trucks.

== Organization ==
The Army Transportation Reserve would be tasked with driving supplies and ammunition to the front. The drivers of the reserve drove five-ton Pierce Arrow trucks and French 75s. It would number around 1,100 drivers at its peak. The Mallet was the first to discover a way of quickly transporting 75mm cannons and caissons to the front.

The reserve was divided into three corps (groupements) of three groups (groupes) each. Each group was composed of 4 sections. Each section was supposed to be manned by 60 drivers and officers, but often was only able to operate around 40. Sections were often named after the school where their recruits came from including: Phillips Andover Academy, California, Massachusetts Institute of Technology, Cornell, Dartmouth, Princeton, Tufts, Marietta, and Buffalo.

The Reserve participated in eight campaigns including the Somme Defensive (March 21 to April 6), the Second Battle of the Marne (July 18 to August 6), the Second Battle of the Somme (August 8 to September 9) and the Meuse-Argonne offensive (October 1 to November 11), the Chemin des Dames defensive (June to July), the Malmaison and Chemin des Dames offensives (October 18-31) and the Cambrai offensive (November 20- 27).

== Dissolution ==
In October 1917, the US Army took over the Reserve Mallet. Those AFS volunteers who chose to enlist were entered into the Motor Transport Corps and the officers were commissioned into the U.S. Army under Major Gordon Robinson. Some of the members of the Mallet declined to join the U.S. Army and instead joined the French artillery or aviation.

Members of the Reserve were awarded two Légions d’Honneur, one Médaille Militaire (Robert Lamont), 17 Croix de Guerre, and several Certificates of Merit.
