= Oliver Warner (politician) =

American politician

14th Massachusetts Secretary of the Commonwealth
- In office 1858–1876
- Governor: Nathaniel Prentice Banks; John Albion Andrew; Alexander H. Bullock; William Claflin; William B. Washburn; Thomas Talbot; William Gaston
- Preceded by: Francis De Witt
- Succeeded by: Henry B. Pierce

Member of the Massachusetts Senate
- In office 1856–1857

Member of the Massachusetts House of Representatives
- In office 1854–1855

Personal details
- Born: April 17, 1818 Northampton, Massachusetts
- Died: September 14, 1885 (aged 67) Lynn, Massachusetts
- Party: Republican Party
- Spouse: Jane S. Daniels Miss. Harriet M. Newhall m. October 2, 1882.
- Education: Williams College
- Profession: Congregational clergyman, librarian

Oliver Warner (April 17, 1818 – September 14, 1885) was a Massachusetts clergyman, politician, and librarian who served in both houses of the Massachusetts legislature and, from 1858 to 1876, served as the 14th Secretary of the Commonwealth.

== Early life ==
Warner was one of nine children born to Rhoda (Bridgman) and Oliver Warner on 17 Apr 1818 in Northampton, Massachusetts.

== Education ==
Warner graduated Phi Beta Kappa from Williams College in 1842. After his gradation from Williams, Warner attended Gilmanton Theological Seminary.

== Marriage ==
On May 29, 1844, Warner married Jane S. Daniels.

== Early career ==
From 1844 to 1846, Warner officiated as a Congregational clergyman in Chesterfield, Massachusetts. In 1852 and 1853, Warner was a tutor at the Williston Seminary in Easthampton, Massachusetts.

== Massachusetts legislature ==
Oliver served in the Massachusetts House of Representatives from 1854 and 1855 and in the Massachusetts Senate from 1856 to 1857.

== Massachusetts Secretary of the Commonwealth ==
Warner served as the Massachusetts Secretary of the Commonwealth for 18 years to 1876.

== 1872 election ==
In the 1872 election, Warner's majority was greater than any other Republican statewide office candidate.

== 1875 election ==
In 1875, Warner ran for re-election, but he lost the Republican nomination for Massachusetts Secretary of the Commonwealth.

== Later career ==
From 1876 to 1879, Warner was the librarian of the Massachusetts State Library.

== Second Marriage ==
On October 2, 1882, Warner married Miss. Harriet M. Newhall of Lynn, Massachusetts.

== Death ==
Warner died in Lynn, Massachusetts, on September 14, 1885.

Political offices
Preceded by Francis De Witt	14th Massachusetts Secretary of the Commonwealth; 1854–1876	Succeeded by Henry B. Pierce
