= Frederic W. Cook =

American politician (1873-1951)

Frederic White Cook
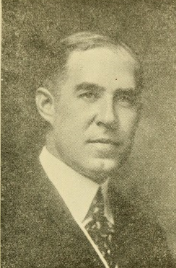

20th Massachusetts Secretary of the Commonwealth
- In office 1921–1949
- Preceded by: Albert P. Langtry
- Succeeded by: Edward J. Cronin

City Clerk
- In office 1905–1920
- Constituency: Somerville, Massachusetts

Personal details
- Born: May 2, 1873 Somerville, Massachusetts, U.S.
- Died: November 16, 1951 (aged 78) Somerville, Massachusetts, U.S.
- Party: Republican
- Spouse: Kathleen Russell (d. April 30, 1947)

Frederic White Cook (May 2, 1873 – November 16, 1951) was an American politician who served as the Massachusetts Secretary of the Commonwealth from 1921 to 1949. As of 2026 he is the last Republican to ever serve in that office.

== Early life ==
Cook was born in Somerville, Massachusetts on May 2, 1873 to Sanford Reuben Cook and his wife Harriet Frances (Dassance) Cook.

Cook attended the Somerville public schools.

== Family life ==
On December 19, 1905, Cook married Kathleen Russell, of Brooklyn, New York. They stayed married until her death in Somerville, Massachusetts on April 30, 1947.

== Early career ==
Cook started out as the assistant clerk of committees, for the city of Somerville. On January 25, 1901, Cook was appointed to the newly created position of Assistant City Clerk of Somerville at a Salary of $1400 a Year.

In 1905 Cook Became the City Clerk of Somerville.

== Massachusetts Secretary of the Commonwealth ==
In 1920 Cook was elected to be the Massachusetts Secretary of the Commonwealth, a position he would hold for a record 28 years.

== Death ==
Cook died November 16, 1951.

Party political offices
Preceded by Albert P. Langtry	Republican nominee for Secretary of the Commonwealth of Massachusetts; 1920, 1922, 1924, 1926, 1928, 1930, 1932, 1934, 1936, 1938, 1940, 1942, 1944, 1946, 1948	Succeeded by Russell A. Wood
Political offices
Preceded by Albert P. Langtry	20th Massachusetts Secretary of the Commonwealth; 1921–1949	Succeeded by Edward J. Cronin
