= William Tudor =

American politician, military officer and lawyer (1750–1819)

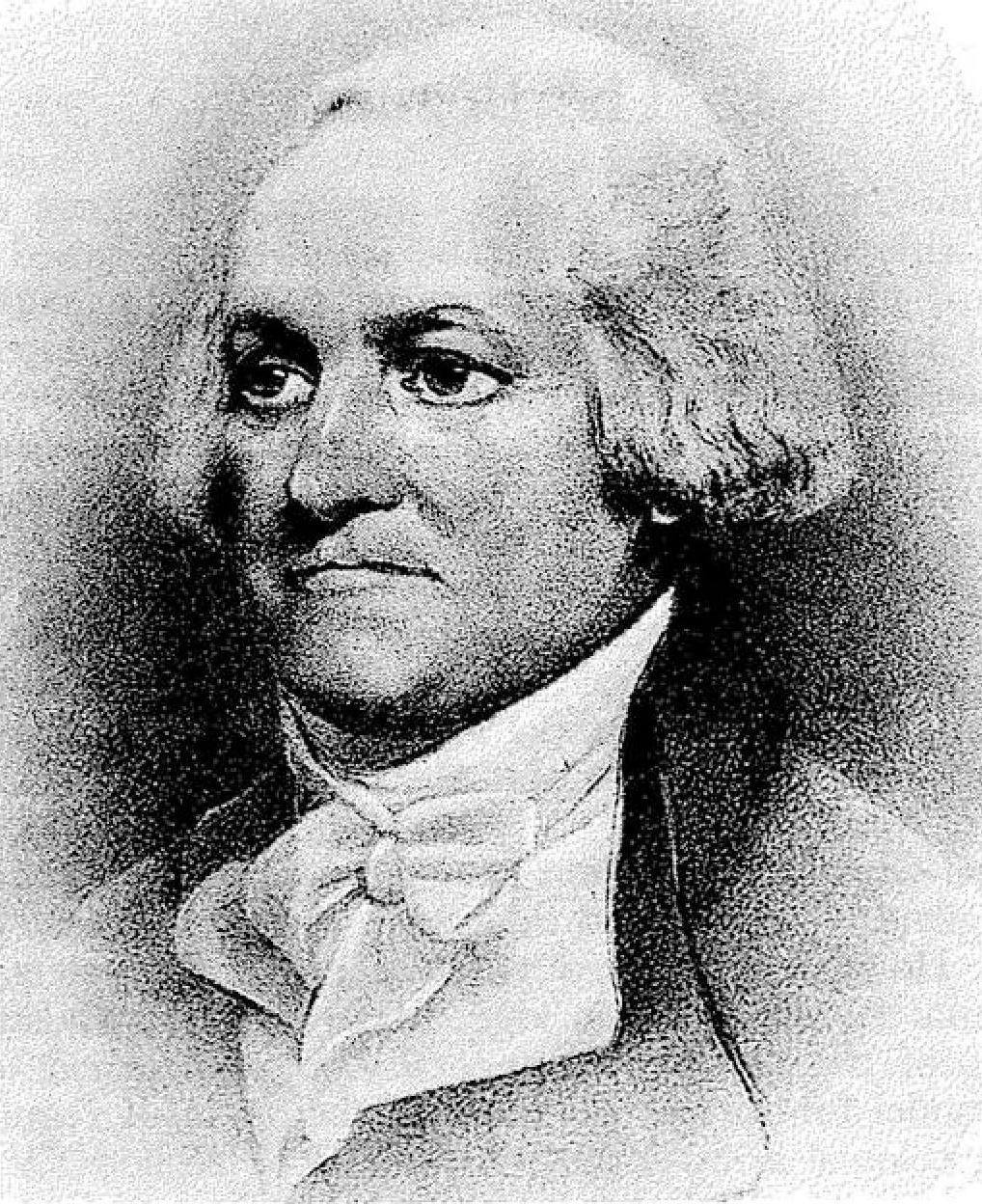

3rd Massachusetts Secretary of the Commonwealth
- In office 1808–1810
- Preceded by: Jonathan L. Austin
- Succeeded by: Benjamin Homans

Personal details
- Born: March 28, 1750
- Died: July 8, 1819 (aged 69)
- Spouse: Delia Jarvis (m. 1778)
- Children: 6 (including William, Frederic)
- Education: Harvard College, 1769.

William Tudor (March 28, 1750 – July 8, 1819) was an American politician, military officer and lawyer from Boston. His eldest son William became a leading literary figure in Boston. Another son, Frederic, founded the Tudor Ice Company and became Boston's "Ice King", shipping ice to the tropics from many local sources of fresh water including Walden Pond, Fresh Pond, and Spy Pond in Arlington, Massachusetts.

== Life ==
Tudor received a Bachelor of Arts degree from Harvard College in 1769, studied law in the office of John Adams, was admitted to the Massachusetts Bay Colony Bar, July 27, 1772, and became outstanding in his profession. He joined George Washington's army in Cambridge where he provided legal advice to Washington and, on July 29, 1775, was appointed Judge Advocate of the Continental Army with the rank of colonel, and then Judge Advocate General (ranked Lieutenant-Colonel) on August 10, 1776. He was also Lieutenant-Colonel of Henley's Additional Continental Regiment.

He married Delia Jarvis on March 5, 1778, and resigned from the army on April 9, 1778, to re-establish himself as a lawyer. His practice flourished, and upon his father's death in 1796 he inherited an estate worth the then-considerable sum of $40,000. Six of their children survived infancy and early childhood: William Tudor (1779-1830); John Henry (1782–1802), who roomed with Washington Allston at Harvard; Frederic (September 4, 1783 – February 6, 1864); Emma Jane (1785–1865), who married Robert Hallowell Gardiner; Delia (1787–1861), who became the wife of Charles Stewart, captain of the USS Constitution; and Henry James (1791–1864).

Tudor served as a Representative of Boston in the Massachusetts General Court, 1781–1794; as a State Senator, 1801 and 1802; Secretary of the Commonwealth, 1808 and 1809; and was a founder of the Massachusetts Historical Society, whose first meeting was held on January 24, 1791, in his house on Court Street, Boston.

The Tudors' summer estate in Lynn (now Nahant), Massachusetts, was accumulated over the course of 25 years. In August 1787, Tudor bought the first 6 acres (24,000 m^{2}) of farmland plus 31 acres (130,000 m^{2}) of woodland. In May 1788, his father John Tudor purchased 3 acres (12,000 m^{2}) of land as well as 6 acres (24,000 m^{2}) of salt marsh in May 1788. William Tudor then purchased 2 acres (8,100 m^{2}) more salt marsh in 1790, 16 acres (65,000 m^{2}) of farmland in 1793, 8 acres (32,000 m^{2}) of pine grove in 1799 and 3 acres (12,000 m^{2}) more in 1801. After subsequent improvement by Tudor's son Frederic, the property has become the Nahant Country Club.

Tudor also owned a country estate in Saugus, Massachusetts (then part of Lynn), which he had inherited from his father. Known as "Rockwood", it was from the estate's pond that Tudor's son Frederic began harvesting ice for shipment to the Caribbean. The Tudors vacated the property in 1807 and leased it to other families until 1823, when it was purchased by the town for use as a poor farm. The farm was torn down in the 1950s and the property was used as the location for a new Saugus High School. Tudor was elected a member of the American Antiquarian Society in 1814.

== Bibliography ==
- A Report of the Record Commissioners of the City of Boston, containing Boston Births from A.D. 1700 to A.D. 1800. (Boston, Mass., Rockwell & Churchill, 1894), p. 275.
- A Volume of Records Relating to the Early History of Boston, containing Boston Marriages from 1752 to 1809. (Boston, Mass., Municipal Printing Office, 1903), p. 374.
- Virgil D. White, Genealogical Abstracts of Revolutionary War Pension Files, (Waynesboro, TN., National Historical Publishing Co., 1992) 3:3552.
- Clifford K. Shipton, Sibley’s Harvard Graduates, 1768–1771. (Boston, MA: Massachusetts Historical Society, 1975), p. 252.

Political offices
Preceded by Jonathan L. Austin	3rd Massachusetts Secretary of the Commonwealth; 1808–1810	Succeeded by Benjamin Homans
