= Alden Bradford =

American politician

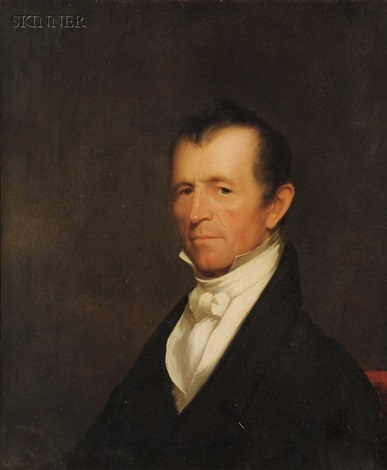

5th Massachusetts Secretary of the Commonwealth
- In office 1812–1824
- Preceded by: Benjamin Homans
- Succeeded by: Edward D. Bangs

Personal details
- Born: 19 November 1765 Duxbury, Massachusetts
- Died: 26 October 1843 (aged 77) Boston, Massachusetts
- Education: Harvard College, 1786
- Occupation: Politician, clergyman, writer

Alden Bradford (19 November 1765 – 26 October 1843) was an American politician, clergyman and author who served as the 5th Massachusetts Secretary of the Commonwealth.

== Biography ==
Alden Bradford was born in Duxbury, Massachusetts on 19 November 1765. He graduated from Harvard in 1786 and received a degree of LL.D. there. He was then ordained as a Congregational church pastor, serving in Wiscasset, Maine. After a short time he resigned his pulpit, ostensibly for health reasons, and became active as a local politician. As an ardent Federalist, Governor Elbridge Gerry dismissed him as clerk of Lincoln County's court. After moving to Boston he served from 1812 to 1824 as secretary of the Commonwealth of Massachusetts. At times a bookseller and journalist, his works included a History of Massachusetts and Memoir of the Life and Writings of Rev. Jonathan Mayhew.

He was a descendant of Plymouth Colony governor William Bradford (c. 1590 – 1657).

Alden Bradford built (or arranged to have built) the Bradford House, built 1794, a historic house in Wiscasset Historic District.

He died in Boston on 26 October 1843.

== Notes ==
Political offices
Preceded by Benjamin Homans	5th Massachusetts Secretary of the Commonwealth; 1812–1824	Succeeded by Edward D. Bangs
