= J. Mitchel Galvin =

American politician (1850–1924)

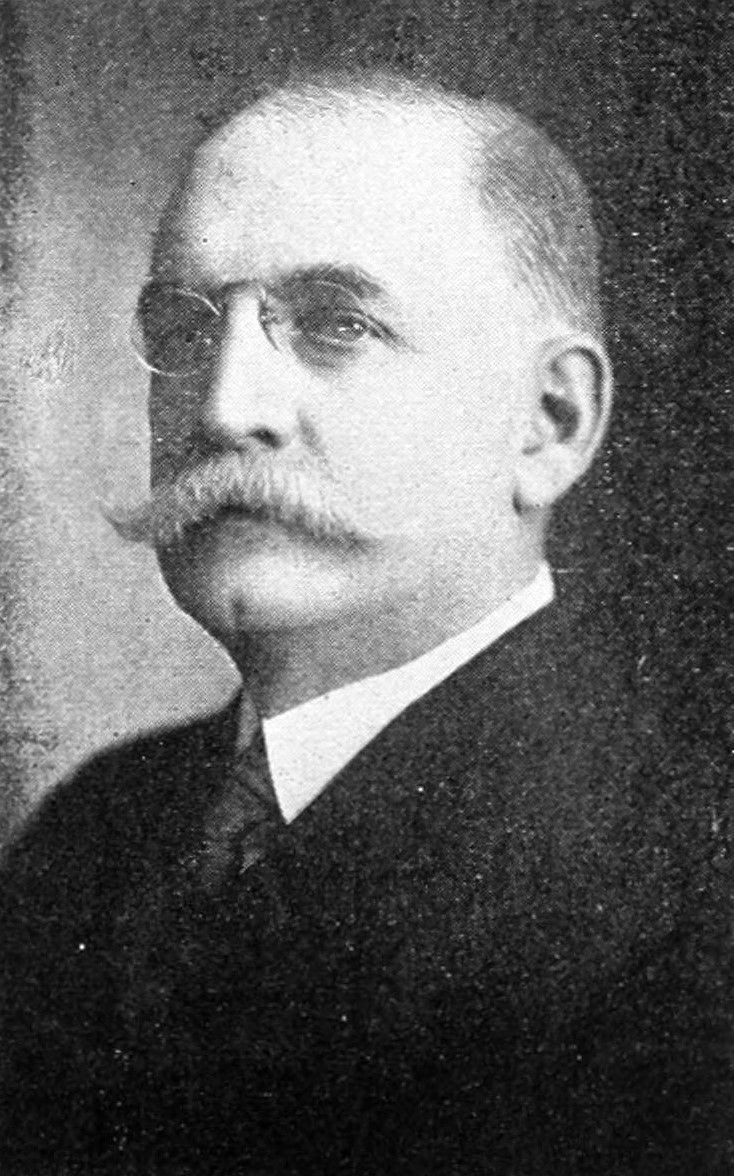

Boston City Clerk
- In office 1899–1900
- Preceded by: John T. Priest (acting)
- Succeeded by: Edward J. Donovan
- In office 1891–1899
- Preceded by: Edwin Upton Curtis
- Succeeded by: John T. Priest (acting)

Personal details
- Born: 1850 Charlestown, Massachusetts, U.S.
- Died: May 8, 1924 (aged 73–74) Boston, U.S.
- Party: Democratic (1884–1905); Republican (1904–1924)

John Mitchel Galvin (1850–1924) was an American politician who served as Boston City Clerk from 1891 to 1900. On November 3, 1908 he was a candidate for the United States House of Representatives seat in Massachusetts's 10th congressional district, but lost to Joseph F. O'Connell by 4 votes.

== Early life ==
Galvin was born in 1850 in Charlestown, Massachusetts. He was named after Irish nationalist John Mitchel. His father, John, was a florist from County Cork and his mother was Irish-American. He was one of three sons. His brother Thomas was a florist and his brother George, was a physician. The Galvin family moved to Boston when Mitch was young.

During his youth, Galvin worked in the dry goods commission business. After four years in this industry, he decided to follow his father's footsteps and became a florist. He later started a contracting business and was hired to do boring work on the Hoosac Tunnel. From 1881 to 1884 he represented Kidder, Peabody & Co. in a mining venture in Mexico. After returning to the United States, Galvin worked for his brother Thomas. He later served as superintendent of Mount Hope Cemetery.

== Political career ==
Upon his return to Boston, Galvin became involved in politics. He campaigned for Boston's annexation of West Roxbury, served on the Jamaica Plain district school committee for many years and was the Democratic nominee for the Massachusetts House of Representatives in Ward 28. He was an avid supporter of Owen A. Galvin and Joseph H. O'Neil and was a friend of Governor Benjamin F. Butler. From 1888 to 1890, Galvin was a member of the Democratic state committee.

In 1889, the Boston common council selected Galvin to succeed O'Neil as city clerk. However, his appointment was blocked the Republican-controlled board of aldermen. In 1891 was he elected city clerk. On September 12, 1899, Galvin resigned as city clerk to become the New England representative for four Colorado-based mining companies. He was succeed on an acting basis by his assistant, John T. Priest. However, when Priest was hospitalized on December 27, 1899, Galvin was brought back as city clerk pro tempore. On February 15, 1900, he was succeeded by Edward J. Donovan. The mining business proved unsuccessful and Galvin went into the insurance business with the firm of O'Neil & Parker.

In 1905, Galvin joined the Republican Party. In 1908 he was the Republican nominee for the United States House of Representatives seat in Massachusetts's 10th congressional district. O'Connell defeated Galvin 16,539 votes to 16,498. A recount was held, which reduced O'Connell's plurality from 41 to 4 (16,563 votes to 16,559). Galvin contended that some of the ballots that were counted for O'Connell had actually been cast for him. He protested O'Connell's right to the seat to the United States House Committee on Elections #1, which ruled in favor of O'Connell.

He was nominated again in 1910, but lost again, this time by more than 4,000 votes.

== Later life ==
On May 20, 1920, Galvin was badly injured after being run over by a car. He recovered and attended the 1920 Republican National Convention, where he was a delegate for Leonard Wood. However, on April 7, 1924, he had to undergo an abdominal operation due to effects from his injury. He never recovered from the surgery and died at Peter Bent Brigham Hospital on May 8, 1924. He is buried at Holyhood Cemetery in Brookline, Massachusetts.
