= Benjamin Homans =

American politician

Chief Clerk of the US Navy Department
- In office March 9, 1813 – December 1, 1823
- Appointed by: James Monroe
- Preceded by: Charles W. Goldsborough
- Succeeded by: Charles Hay

4th Secretary of the Commonwealth of Massachusetts
- In office 1810–1812
- Succeeded by: Alden Bradford

Personal details
- Born: c. 1765 Massachusetts
- Died: December 1823 Georgetown, D.C.
- Children: I. Smith Homans

Benjamin Homans (c. 1765 – December 1823) was an American merchant captain, and politician who served as the 4th Massachusetts Secretary of the Commonwealth and who served from as the Chief Clerk of the Navy Department, which was at the time the second highest civilian position in the US Navy.

== Early career ==
Born in Massachusetts, Homans had been a merchant captain during the 1780s and 1790s. During the Quasi war with France, because of the Sedition Act and because he was an ardent Jeffersonian, Homans went into exile in Bordeaux.

== War of 1812 ==
Prior to the 1814 British attack, and Burning of Washington during the War of 1812, it was Homans, along with Dolley Madison who removed two wagon loads of the White House and Navy Department's archives; including saving Charles Willson Peale's classic portrait of George Washington. The trunks were transferred onto a canal boat and taken upstream on the Potomac River, where they were stored in a barn near Cabin John, Maryland until the danger had passed.

== Later life ==
Homans resigned as chief clerk of the Navy Department to become naval storekeeper in Portsmouth, New Hampshire, but died in Georgetown in December 1823 before he could leave Washington to take up the new post.

== Notes ==
Political offices
Preceded by William Tudor	4th Massachusetts Secretary of the Commonwealth; 1810 – 1812	Succeeded by Alden Bradford
Government offices
Preceded by Charles W. Goldsborough	Chief Clerk of the US Navy Department; March 9, 1813 - December 1, 1823	Succeeded by Charles Hay
