= Henry B. Pierce =

American politician

Henry Bailey Pierce
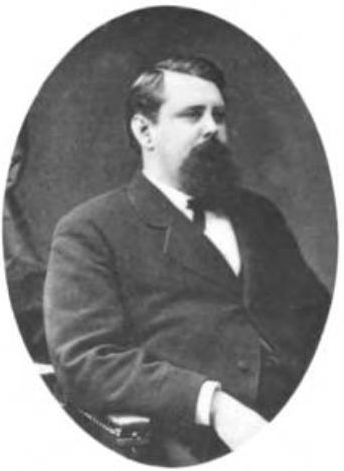

15th Massachusetts Secretary of the Commonwealth
- In office 1876–1891
- Governor: Alexander H. Rice; Thomas Talbot; John Davis Long; Benjamin F. Butler; George D. Robinson; Oliver Ames; John Q. A. Brackett
- Preceded by: Oliver Warner
- Succeeded by: William M. Olin

Personal details
- Born: August 6, 1841 Duxbury, Massachusetts
- Died: April 1898 (aged 56) Abington, Massachusetts
- Party: Republican
- Spouse(s): C. Elvira Carew; married October 19, 1861, b. September 26, 1839; died, April 9, 1862. Augusta Arnold; married December 31, 1865, b. September. 6, 1841, d. February 10, 1882. Fanny B. Pease; married April 25, 1883, b. Oct. 19, 1843.
- Children: Eugene E. Pierce, b. April 16, 1868; Anne G. Pierce, b. May 31, 1877.
- Profession: Insurance executive

Military service
- Allegiance: United States of America; Union
- Branch/service: Union Army
- Years of service: October 14, 1861-July 10, 1865
- Rank: Captain
- Unit: 23rd Regiment Massachusetts Volunteer Infantry
- Battles/wars: American Civil War

Henry Bailey Pierce (1841-1898) was a Massachusetts insurance executive and politician who served as Secretary of the Commonwealth from 1876 to 1891.

== Early life ==
Pierce was born on August 6, 1841, in Duxbury, Massachusetts.

== Family life ==
Pierce married three times, first to C. Elvira Carew, they were married on October 19, 1861, she died on April 9, 1862. Pierce then married Augusta Arnold on December 31, 1865, she died on February 10, 1882. On April 25, 1883, Pierce married his third wife Fanny B. Pease.

=== Children ===
Pierce had two children, Eugene E. Pierce, born on April 16, 1868, and Anne G. Pierce, born May 31, 1877.

== Military service ==
Pierce served in the 23rd Regiment Massachusetts Infantry Volunteers during the American Civil War. Pierce enlisted on October 14, 1861, and he was discharged on July 10, 1865.

== Massachusetts Secretary of the Commonwealth ==
Pierce served as Massachusetts Secretary of the Commonwealth for sixteen years, from 1876 to 1891.

== Business career ==
Pierce was the president of the Abington Mutual Fire Insurance Company, and the Boston manager or the American Surety Company.

== Writing ==
With historian Duane Hamilton Hurd, he wrote a History of Tioga, Chemung, Tompkins and Schuyler counties, New York, published in 1879.

== Death ==
Pierce died at his home in Abington, Massachusetts, in April 1898.

Political offices
Preceded by Oliver Warner	15th Massachusetts Secretary of the Commonwealth; 1876–1891	Succeeded by William M. Olin
