= Rejoice Newton =

American politician (1782–1868)

District attorney of Worcester County, Massachusetts
- In office 1818–1824
- Preceded by: William Charles White
- Succeeded by: Edward D. Bangs

Personal details
- Born: October 18, 1782 Greenfield, Massachusetts, U.S.
- Died: April 30, 1940 (aged 80) Worcester, Massachusetts, U.S.
- Resting place: Rural Cemetery; Worcester, Massachusetts
- Spouse: Rebecca Lincoln (m. 1817; died 1855)
- Children: 3
- Education: Dartmouth College
- Occupation: Attorney

Rejoice Newton (October 18, 1782 – February 4, 1868) was an American lawyer and politician who was a member of the Massachusetts General Court and district attorney of Worcester County, Massachusetts.

== Biography ==
Newton was born on October 18, 1782 in Greenfield, Massachusetts. He graduated from Dartmouth College in 1807 and studied law under Levi Lincoln Sr. He was admitted to the bar in 1810 and entered a partnership with Francis Blake. He later had a partnerships with William Lincoln and Henry Chapin. In 1817, he married Levi Lincoln Sr.'s daughter, Rebecca.

From 1818 to 1824, Newton was the district attorney of Worcester County. He represented Worcester, Massachusetts in the Massachusetts House of Representatives from 1829 to 1831 and in the Massachusetts Senate in 1834.

Newton died on February 4, 1868.
