= Edward D. Bangs =

American politician

Edward Dillingham Bangs
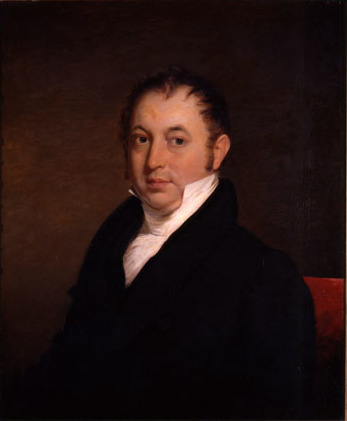

6th Massachusetts Secretary of the Commonwealth
- In office 1824–1836
- Governor: William Eustis; Marcus Morton; Levi Lincoln Jr. John Davis
- Preceded by: Alden Bradford
- Succeeded by: John P. Bigelow

County Attorney of Worcester County, Massachusetts
- In office February 19, 1824 – 1824
- Preceded by: Rejoice Newton
- Succeeded by: Pliny Merrick

Member the Massachusetts Constitutional Convention of 1820

Personal details
- Born: August 24, 1790 Worcester, Massachusetts
- Died: April 1, 1838 (aged 47)
- Spouse: Mary Grosvenor
- Education: Harvard University M.A. 1827
- Profession: Attorney

Edward Dillingham Bangs (August 24, 1790 – April 1, 1838) was an American politician who served as the 6th Massachusetts Secretary of the Commonwealth from 1824 to 1836.

== Early life ==
Bangs was born on August 24, 1790, in Worcester, Massachusetts, to Hannah (Lynde) Bangs and Judge Edward Bangs.

Bangs was elected a member of the American Antiquarian Society in 1819.

== Family life ==
On April 12, 1824, Bangs married Mary Grosvenor of Pomfret, Connecticut.

== Notes ==
Political offices
Preceded by Alden Bradford	6th Massachusetts Secretary of the Commonwealth; 1824–1836	Succeeded by John P. Bigelow
