= Louis A. Frothingham =

American politician (1871–1928)

Louis Adams Frothingham
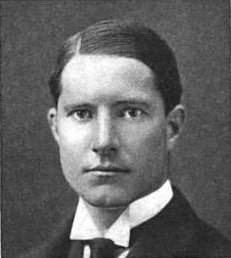

Member of the U.S. House of Representatives from Massachusetts's 14th district
- In office March 4, 1921 – August 23, 1928
- Preceded by: Richard Olney II
- Succeeded by: Richard B. Wigglesworth

41st Lieutenant Governor of Massachusetts
- In office 1909–1912
- Governor: Eben Sumner Draper; Eugene Foss
- Preceded by: Eben Sumner Draper
- Succeeded by: Robert Luce

Speaker of the Massachusetts House of Representatives
- In office 1904–1905
- Preceded by: James J. Myers
- Succeeded by: John N. Cole

Massachusetts House of Representatives 11th Suffolk District

Personal details
- Born: July 13, 1871 Jamaica Plain, Massachusetts, U.S.
- Died: August 23, 1928 (aged 57) North Haven, Maine, U.S.
- Party: Republican
- Spouse: Mary Shreve (Ames) Frothingham
- Education: Adams Academy; Harvard University, 1893; Harvard Law School, 1896
- Profession: Attorney

Military service
- Allegiance: United States of America
- Branch/service: Battery A of the Massachusetts Field Artillery, Massachusetts National Guard; Massachusetts Naval Brigade, Auxiliary Naval Force; United States Marine Corps; United States Army
- Years of service: April 25, 1895 – April 25, 1898; May 1898 – January 1899
- Rank: Private, Ensign, Second Lieutenant, Major
- Battles/wars: Spanish–American War, World War I

Louis Adams Frothingham (July 13, 1871 – August 23, 1928) was a United States representative from Massachusetts.

== Early life ==
Frothingham was born in Jamaica Plain on July 13, 1871. He attended the public schools and Adams Academy. He graduated from Harvard University in 1893 (where he was a member of the Porcellian) and from Harvard Law School in 1896. He was admitted to the bar and commenced practice in Boston. He served as second lieutenant in the United States Marine Corps in the Spanish–American War.

== Political career ==
Frothingham was elected a member of the Massachusetts House of Representatives, and served as Speaker from 1904 to 1905. He was the Republican nominee in the 1905 Boston mayoral election after narrowly defeating former Judge Henry S. Dewey. He lost the general election to Democrat John F. Fitzgerald 48% to 39%. He served as the 41st lieutenant governor 1909–1911, but was an unsuccessful candidate for governor in 1911. He was lecturer at Harvard. He then moved to North Easton and continued the practice of law. He was a delegate to the Republican National Convention in 1916.

On May 9, 1916, Frothingham married Mary Shreve Ames in North Easton, Massachusetts. Mary Shreve Ames was a member of the wealthy and prominent Ames family of Easton, Massachusetts, she was the daughter of Frederick Lothrop Ames the great niece of Congressman Oakes Ames, and the first cousin, once removed of Oliver Ames who was Lieutenant Governor and Governor of Massachusetts.

Frothingham served as a major in the United States Army during World War I. He was a member of the commission to visit the soldiers and sailors from Massachusetts in France. He served as first vice commander of the Massachusetts branch of the American Legion in 1919. He was overseer of Harvard University for eighteen years.

Frothingham was elected as a Republican to the Sixty-seventh and to the three succeeding Congresses and served from March 4, 1921, until his death on board the yacht Winsome in North Haven, Maine on August 23, 1928. His interment was in Village Cemetery in North Easton.

== See also ==
- List of speakers of the Massachusetts House of Representatives
- List of members of the United States Congress who died in office (1900–1949)
- 125th Massachusetts General Court (1904)
- 126th Massachusetts General Court (1905)

Party political offices
Preceded by Eben Sumner Draper	Republican nominee for Governor of Massachusetts; 1911	Succeeded by Joseph H. Walker
Massachusetts House of Representatives
Preceded by James J. Myers	Speaker of the Massachusetts House of Representatives; 1904–1905	Succeeded by John N. Cole
Political offices
Preceded by Eben Sumner Draper	Lieutenant Governor of Massachusetts; 1909–1912	Succeeded by Robert Luce
U.S. House of Representatives
Preceded by Richard Olney	Member of the U.S. House of Representatives from Massachusetts's 14th congressional district 1921–1928	Succeeded by Richard B. Wigglesworth
