= Joseph A. Maynard =

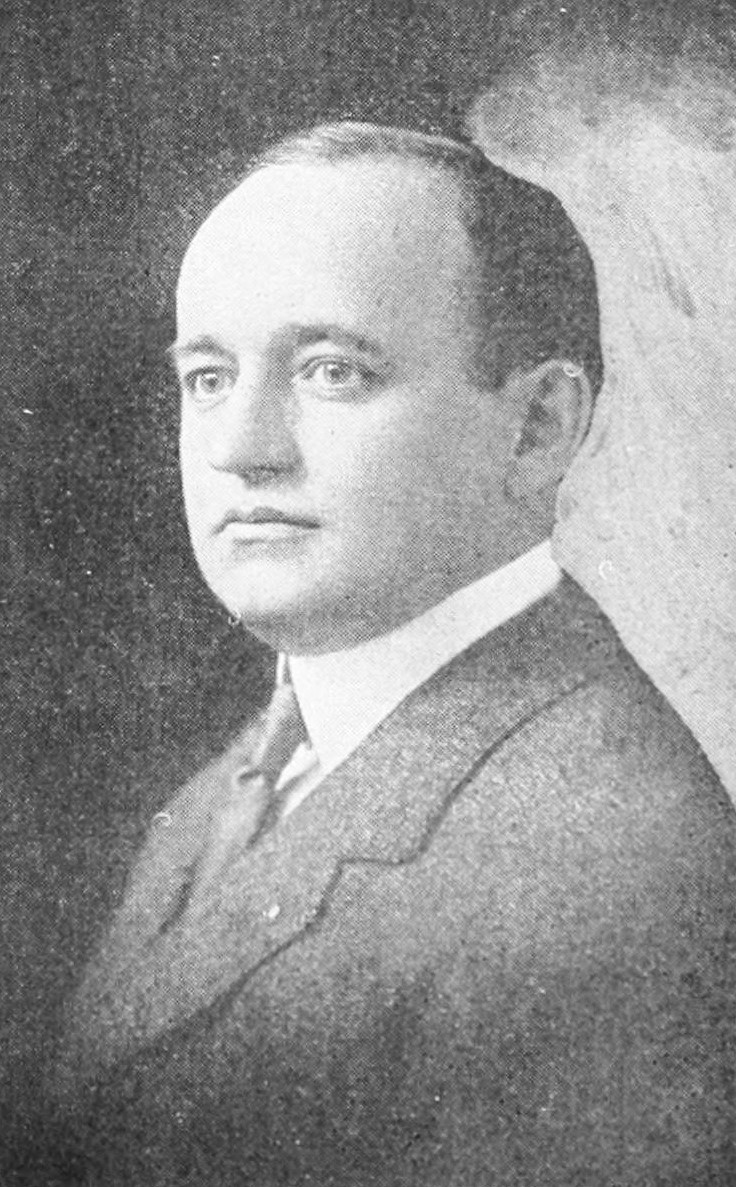

Collector of Customs for the Port of Boston
- In office 1933–1938
- President: Franklin D. Roosevelt
- Preceded by: Willfred W. Lufkin
- Succeeded by: Joseph McGrath

Chairman of the Massachusetts Democratic Party
- In office 1932–1934
- Preceded by: Frank J. Donahue
- Succeeded by: Charles H. McGlue

Surveyor of Customs for the Port of Boston
- In office 1913–1921
- Preceded by: Edward G. Graves
- Succeeded by: Herman Hormel

Chairman of the Democratic City Committee of Boston
- In office 1910–1914
- Preceded by: James Donovan
- Succeeded by: James P. Timilty

Personal details
- Born: January 1, 1875 Boston, Massachusetts, U.S.
- Died: January 7, 1938 (aged 63) Brookline, Massachusetts, U.S.

Joseph A. Maynard (January 1, 1875 – January 7, 1938) was an American political figure who served as chairman of the Massachusetts Democratic Party and Collector of Customs for the Port of Boston.

== Early life and political activity ==
Maynard was born on January 1, 1875, in Boston. He entered the business world at a young age, working as a manufacturer of plumbing supplies and later a director of the F.W. Webb Company, Fidelity Trust Company, Hibernia Savings Bank, and the McAuliffe Company.

Once he reached voting age, Maynard joined the Hendricks Club, where he became a lieutenant of Martin Lomasney.

In 1902, Maynard was elected to the Boston Common Council.

On June 22, 1913, Maynard married Grace Earle Moore in Lawrence, Massachusetts.

== Democratic Party politics ==
=== City chairman ===
From 1910 to 1914, Maynard, backed by Lomasney, James Michael Curley, and John F. Fitzgerald, served as president of the Boston Democratic Committee.

=== State chairman ===
On July 14, 1932, Maynard was elected chairman of the Massachusetts Democratic Party. He defeated acting chairman Charles D. Riordon 74 votes to 30. During his tenure as chairman, Maynard worked to build the party by reconciling the disputes between its different factions. He was forced to resign from this position on September 30, 1934, after the Treasury Department ruled that its officers could not hold the position of state party chairman or national committeeman.

== Customs ==
=== Surveyor ===
From 1913 to 1921, Maynard served as surveyor for the Port of Boston. Appointed at the age of 38, he was the youngest person to hold this position.

=== Collector ===
In 1933, Maynard was appointed Collector of Customs for the Port of Boston by his close, personal friend Franklin D. Roosevelt. He was reappointed by Roosevelt in 1937.

In addition to his duties as Collector, Maynard was also a trustee of the Norfolk County Agricultural School from 1934 to 1938.

== Death ==
On January 7, 1938, Maynard suffered a heart attack at the Boston Custom House. Maynard was able to walk to his car and was being driven home by his chauffeur when the attack became worse. Deputy Collector Owen McKenna, who was accompanying Maynard, stopped to consult a doctor. Maynard, however, was too ill to leave the car and the doctor decided to follow Maynard in his car and treat Maynard at home. Maynard lost consciousness in the car and could not be revived. He was pronounced dead at his home in Brookline, Massachusetts. The official cause of death was Angina pectoris.

Party political offices
Preceded by James Donovan	Chairman of the Democratic City Committee of Boston; 1910–1914	Succeeded by James P. Timilty
Preceded by Frank J. Donahue	Chairman of the Massachusetts Democratic Party; 1932–1934	Succeeded by Charles H. McGlue
Government offices
Preceded by Edward G. Graves	Surveyor of Customs for the Port of Boston; 1913–1921	Succeeded by Herman Hormel
Preceded by Willfred W. Lufkin	Collector of Customs for the Port of Boston; 1933–1938	Succeeded by Joseph McGrath
