= Mary Shreve (Ames) Frothingham =

US activist and politician

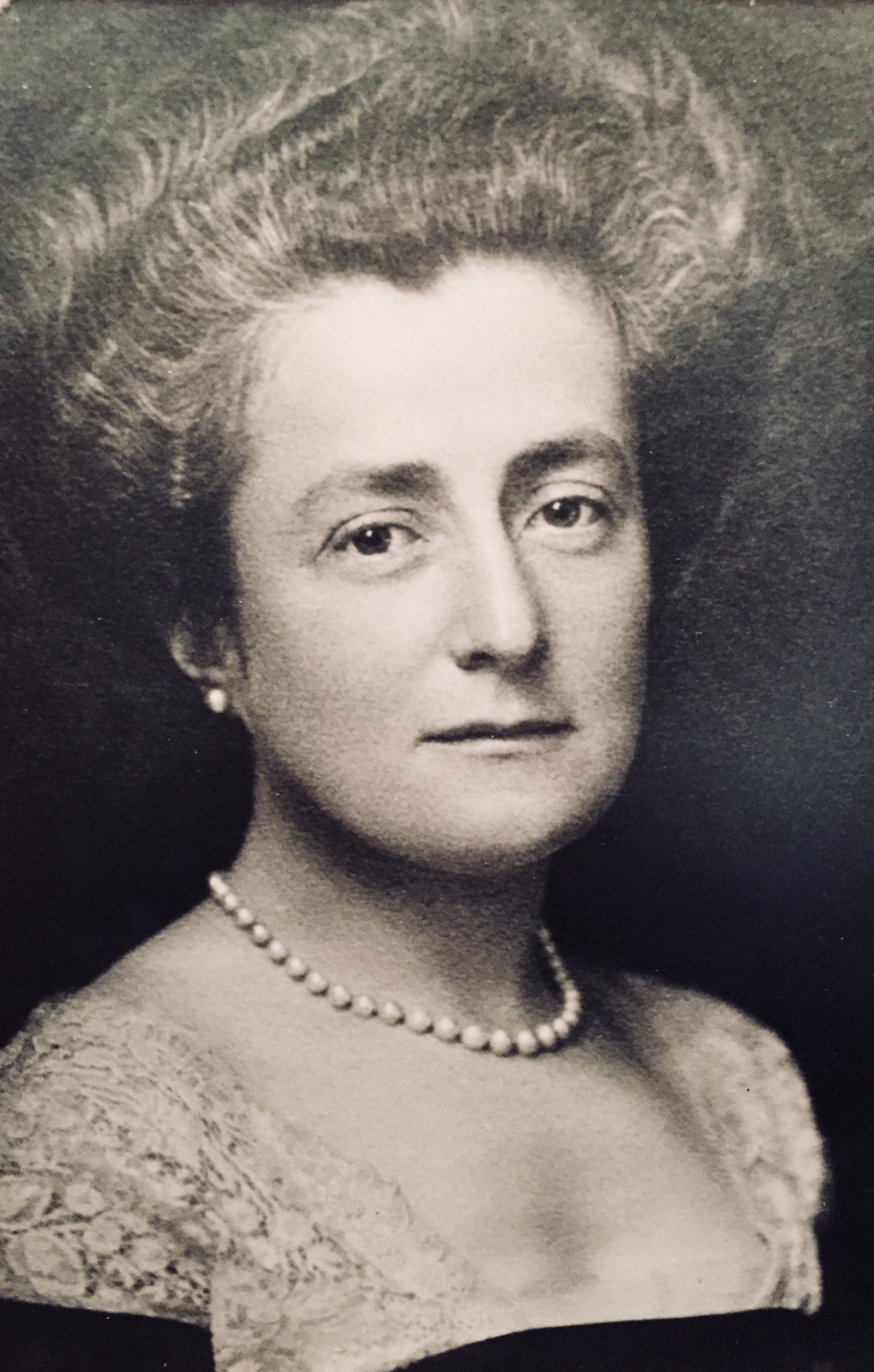
- Born: February 1, 1867; Easton, Massachusetts
- Died: May 5, 1955 (aged 88)
- Parent(s): Frederick Lothrop Ames, Rebecca C. Blair
- Relatives: Oliver Ames, Sr. great-grandfather Frederick Lothrop Ames Jr. brother Oakes Ames great-uncle

Mary Shreve (Ames) Frothingham (February 1, 1867 - May 5, 1955) was born into the prominent Ames family of Easton, Massachusetts. She held crucial roles in the development of many local and nationally recognized organizations through leadership and financial contributions. She assumed modesty in her personal life so as to give generously to others. Her legacy in her hometown can still be enjoyed by many at the Ames Free Library, Unity Church, Frothingham Hall, Frothingham Park and her home ‘Wayside’.

== Family ==
Mary was the daughter of Frederick Lothrop Ames of Easton, Massachusetts (June 8, 1835 - September 13, 1893) and Rebecca Caroline (Blair) Ames of St. Louis Missouri (December 30, 1839 - January 20, 1903). She was the granddaughter of Oliver Ames Jr. (President of the Union Pacific Railroad 1868-1871) and great-granddaughter of Oliver Ames Sr. who founded the Ames Shovel Works in 1803.

== Political Career and Marriage ==
In 1905, she was a member of the Massachusetts Association Opposed to the Further Extension of Suffrage and became president. This was in direct conflict with her cousin-in-law Blanche Ames, President of the Easton Woman Suffrage League and Treasurer of the Massachusetts Woman Suffrage League. The two family members maintained a very genial relationship regardless, agreeing to disagree. For example, when the 19th Amendment passed in 1920, Blanche would often consult with Mary on whom to vote for in the coming elections.

On May 8, 1916, she married Louis A. Frothingham (March 4, 1871 - August 23, 1928) at Unity Church in Easton, Massachusetts. Born in Jamaica Plain, Massachusetts, Frothingham served as Major in the United States Army during World War 1. He graduated from Harvard Law in 1896, was Speaker of the Massachusetts House of Representatives and 41st Lieutenant Governor of Massachusetts (1909-1912).

In 1918, Mr. Frothingham was sent to France by Governor Samuel W. McCall. While stationed in Paris, Mr. and Mrs. Frothingham opened their home to soldiers on leave and even attended to troops at the front line in the trenches.

When Mr. Frothingham was running for Massachusetts 14th Congressional district in 1920, Mary served as Chairperson of the Woman's Republican Town Committee in Easton.

== Community Involvement ==
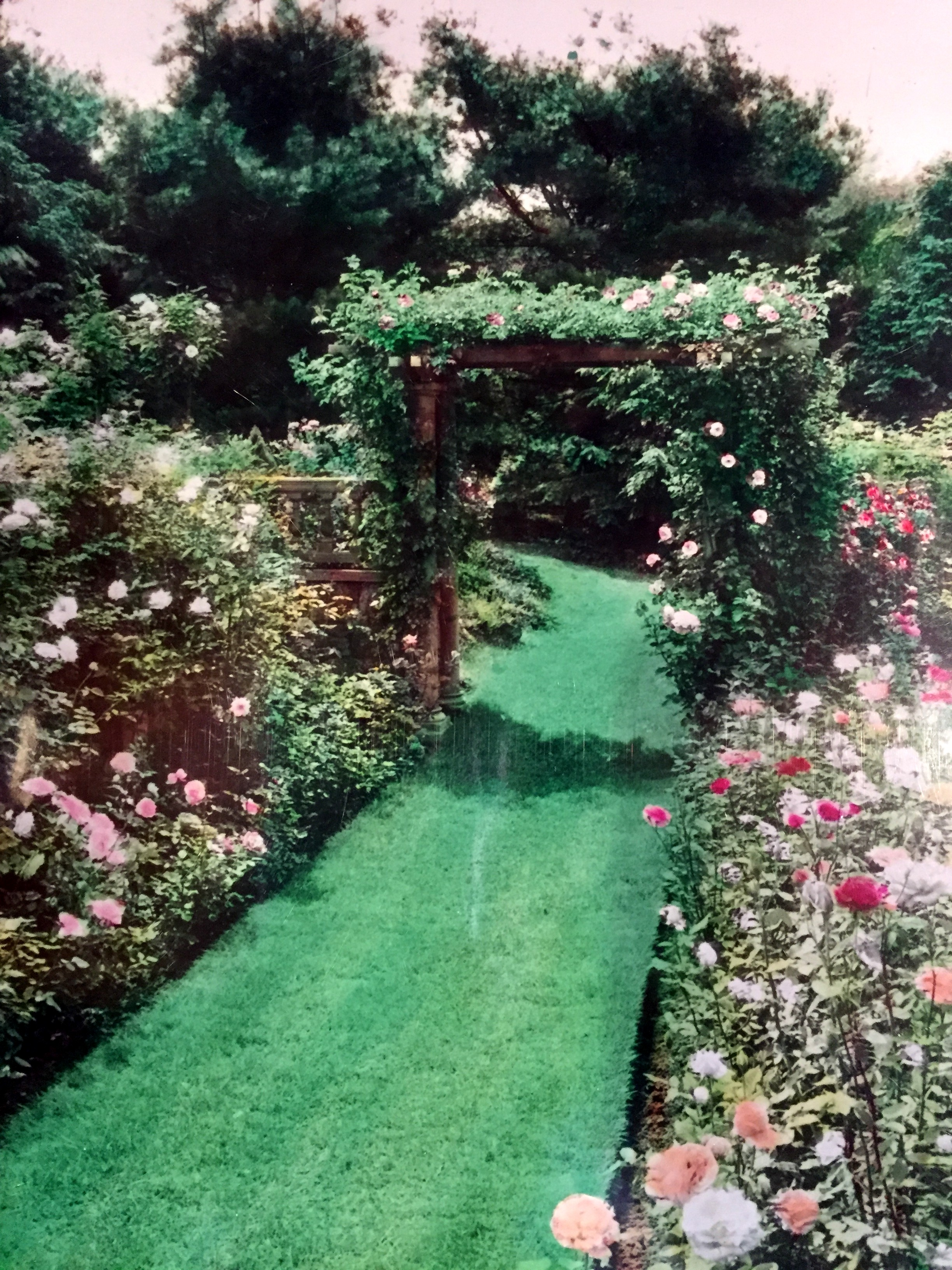
Mary Frothingham rose garden

Having met Clara Barton as a young woman and establishing a longtime friendship, Mary involved herself with the Red Cross. She established the Easton branch and was President from World War I through World War II. Frothingham Hall, dedicated to her husband, served the efforts of the Red Cross through all day knitting and sewing sessions. Volunteers made coats, sweaters, pajamas and repaired bandages.

She was first president of the American Legion Auxiliary of Easton in 1920 and maintained an interest in the support of veterans and peace groups throughout her life.

Her devotion to the Unity Church of Easton, Massachusetts was noteworthy. Along with her mother and siblings Oliver, Frederick, John and Helen, she gave the oak screen and pulpit at the front of the church and also the Charles Jay Connick stained glass window above the main entrance. The oak carving is that of artist Johannes Kirchmayer and designed by Boston architect Henry Vaughan. She was Trustee of the Village Cemetery, located behind the church, from 1900 to 1954.

The Ames Free Library in North Easton, MA benefited greatly from Mary's involvement and care. Beginning in 1900, she frequented the library often and would update any technology to suit modern day needs. For example, she introduced and paid for the first new typewriter and card catalog. She served as President of the Library from 1929 to 1955. Her portrait is hanging in the library to this day.

During World War I, she gave each child in town, grades 4 through 12, a thrift card and stamp to foster as interest in patriotism during wartime. She hosted a Christmas party each year for the grammar school students in Easton and provided a gift for each one. The event was held every Christmas for forty years and was reduced to only serving North Easton Grammar School kindergarten after her death. It was eventually phased out as the population and number of schools increased. She installed lockers and showers in the Anna C. Ames Gymnasium, assumed mortgages on homes in Easton that were considered a great risk and paid for the cost of dormitory life at Bridgewater State University for the daughter of her estate superintendent.

Her affection for gardens and public parks was evident in her charitable contributions and causes she supported. The garden at her home was large and well-kept. She commissioned landscape architect Herbert J. Kellaway to design the layout. Harriett Risley Foote, celebrated rosarian, selected the roses and supervised their planting. In 1924, the American Rose Society honored her rose garden with a visit during their annual meeting. In addition, she encouraged a home garden program for local school children. She donated to the Arnold Arboretum in Boston and she was one of the few patrons allowed to drive through the park. Frothingham Park, a memorial to her husband's baseball career as Captain at Harvard, was dedicated on September 27, 1930. The YMCA and Oliver Ames High School utilized the park for sporting events until the 1980s, it is still used as the home field for the Oliver Ames baseball team today. There stands a playground for young children, a baseball field surrounded by a track and tennis courts.

== Wayside ==
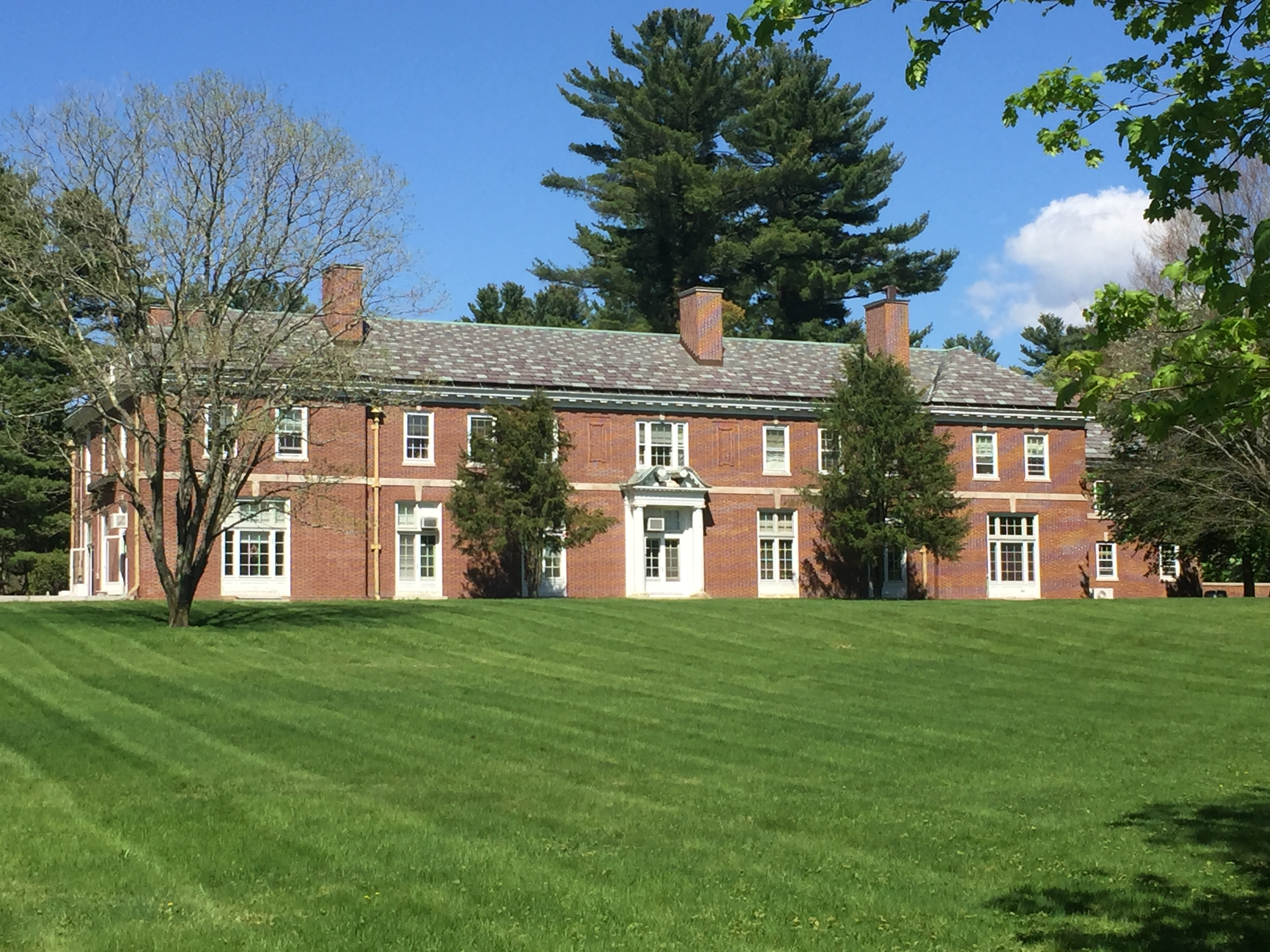
Mary's home, Wayside (Easton town offices)

Her Georgian Revival style mansion known as ’Wayside’ was built in 1912. Designed by Boston architect Guy Lowell, Wayside now serves as the Easton town offices.

== Personal ==
Following the sudden death of her husband, G.O.P. leaders requested that Mary become a candidate to the 14th district office of representative in Congress. She declined the offer, citing her love of North Easton and her family and desire to remain devoted to local organizations.

== Bibliography ==
- "American Rose Society to Visit Louis A. Frothingham Estate at North Easton", Boston Evening Transcript, Boston, MA, p. 3, September 20, 1924
- "GOP Leaders to Urge Candidacy of Mrs. Frothingham", Brockton Enterprise, Brockton, MA, p. 1, August 25, 1928
- "Mrs. Frothingham Not Candidate for Office", Brockton Enterprise, Brockton, MA, p. 1, August 28, 1928
- Ames Jr., David (2017), "Celebrating Seventy-Five Years and Counting", Easton Historical Society: Reminiscences, 8: 72–79
- Ames, Elizabeth M. (2011), "Memories of Ames Relatives", Easton Historical Society: Reminiscences, 2: 43
- Chaplin, Ann T. (2004),Descendents of William Ames of Braintree, Massachusetts, Newbury Street Press ISBN 0-88082-182-5.
- Varella, Hazel L. (1978), Wayside: The Home of Mr. and Mrs. Louis A. Frothingham, Easton Historical Society
