= A. Piatt Andrew =

American politician and economist

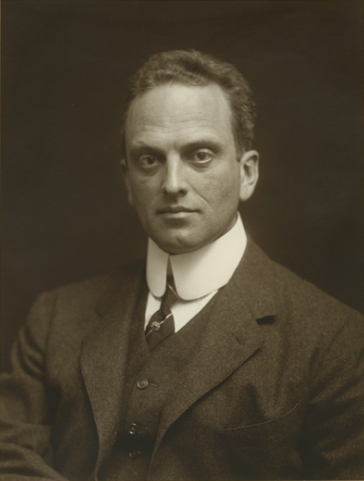
- Abram Piatt Andrew circa 1920

Member of the U.S. House of Representatives from Massachusetts's 6th district
- In office September 27, 1921 – June 3, 1936
- Preceded by: Willfred W. Lufkin
- Succeeded by: George J. Bates

Personal details
- Born: Abram Piatt Andrew Jr. February 12, 1873 La Porte, Indiana, U.S.
- Died: June 3, 1936 (aged 63) Gloucester, Massachusetts, U.S.
- Resting place: ashes scattered over Red Roof, Eastern Point, Gloucester, MA
- Party: Republican
- Education: Lawrenceville School, Princeton College

Military service
- Allegiance: United States
- Branch/service: United States Army
- Years of service: September 1917–1918
- Rank: Lieutenant colonel
- Battles/wars: World War I
- Awards: Legion of Honor; Distinguished Service Medal

Abram Piatt Andrew Jr. (February 12, 1873 – June 3, 1936) was an American economist and politician who served as Assistant Secretary of the Treasury, the founder and director of the American Ambulance Field Service during World War I, and an 8-term member of the U.S. House of Representatives from Massachusetts.

== Early life and education ==
He was born in La Porte, Indiana, on February 12, 1873. He attended the public schools and the Lawrenceville School. He graduated from Princeton College in 1893, studied at the Harvard Graduate School of Arts and Sciences from 1893 to 1898, graduating with a master's degree in 1895 and a doctorate in 1900. He later pursued postgraduate studies in the Universities of Halle, Berlin, and Paris.

== Early career in economics ==
He moved to Gloucester, Massachusetts, and was an instructor and assistant professor of economics at Harvard University from 1900 to 1909.

=== Federal appointments ===
In January 1907, Andrew published a paper that anticipated the economic panic that hit in the fall of that year. On the strength of this paper as well as on his strong economics education, Andrew was selected to serve on the National Monetary Commission tasked with reforming the American banking system. Andrew took a leave from Harvard and spent two years studying the central banks of Germany, Britain and France. He served as Director of the U.S. Mint in 1909 and 1910, and as Assistant Secretary of the Treasury from 1910 to 1912. He attended the historic meeting at Jekyll Island in 1910 with commission chairman Nelson W. Aldrich, Henry P. Davison, Benjamin Strong, Paul Warburg, and Frank A. Vanderlip. The commission's report recommended the creation of a Federal Reserve System.

The Republicans lost the White House in 1912, putting Andrew out of a job. He worked informally after the election with Democratic Senator Robert Latham Owen to draft Owen's version of a Federal Reserve Bill, which in the event came closest of several competing drafts to the Act eventually passed and signed into law in December 1913.

== Founder of American Field Service ==
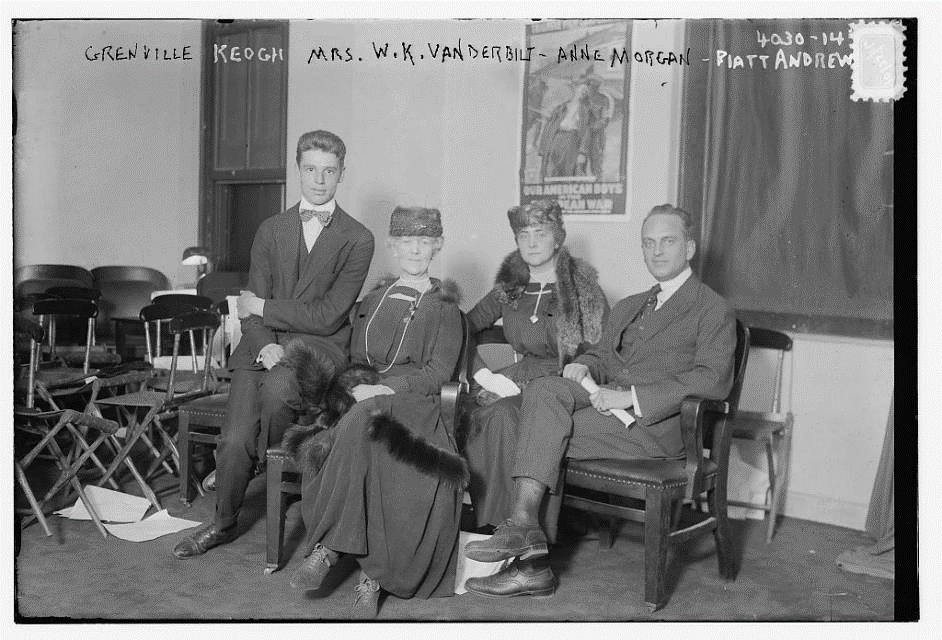
Grenville Keogh, Anne Harriman Vanderbilt, Anne Morgan, Piatt Andrew, 1916 (Grenville Keogh was an ambulance driver for the American Ambulance Field Service)

Despite American neutrality, Andrew went to France when war broke out in the summer of 1914. He wrote to his parents about his compulsion to respond to "the possibility of having even an infinitesimal part in one of the greatest events in all history--...and above all the chance of doing the little all that one can for France."

Andrew drove an ambulance in the Dunkirk sector for a few weeks, but his supervisor at the American Military Hospital recognized his exceptional energy and organizing ability. Robert Bacon created a new position for him to fill: Inspector General of the American Ambulance Field Service. In his official capacity, Andrew toured the ambulance sections of Northern France and learned that the American volunteers were bored with so called "jitney work," transporting wounded soldiers from railheads to hospitals, far back from the front lines. French army policy prohibited foreign nationals from traveling into battle zones.

In March 1915, Andrew met with Captain Aime Doumenc, head of the French Army Automobile Service and pleaded his case for the American volunteers. They desired above all, he said, "To pick up the wounded from the front lines..., to look danger squarely in the face; in a word, to mingle with the soldiers of France and to share their fate!" Doumenc agreed to a trial. The success of Andrew's Section Z was immediate and overwhelming. By April 15, 1915, the French created American Ambulance Field Service operating under French Army command.

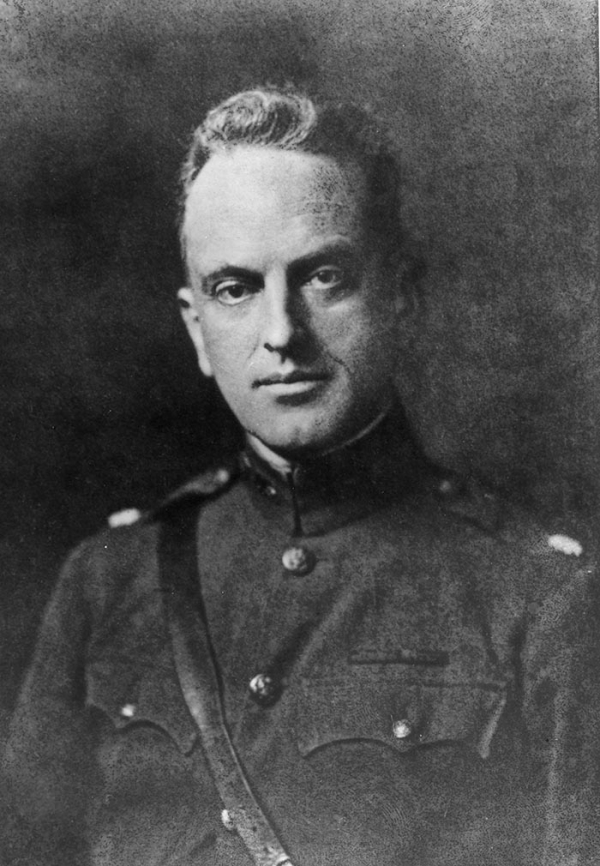
Lieutenant Colonel A. Piatt Andrew Jr.

Andrew headed the organization, soon shortened to American Field Service, throughout the war, though his role changed significantly when its ambulance sections were taken over by the United States Army in late summer 1917. Andrew established a domestic organization based in Boston to recruit young American drivers and to raise funds from wealthy donors. The stateside office was headed by Henry Davis Sleeper and assisted by John Hays Hammond Jr and former ambulance driver, Leslie Buswell. The French office was located at number 21 rue Raynouard, Paris.

At the time of militarization, the American Field Service had formed thirty-four ambulance sections manned by 1,200 American volunteers. (A total of 2,100 volunteers had volunteered over the course of two years.) In addition the AFS had created fourteen camion sections with 800 additional American volunteers trucking supplies and soldiers up the Voie Sacree from Bar-le-Duc to Verdun and other routes to the Front.

The AFS motto was "Tous et tout pour France," everyone and everything for France. At an AFS reunion a few years after the war, Andrew said, "The opportunity of living in France, as we Americans lived during the first years of the war...meant glimpses of human nature shorn of self, exalted by love of country, singing and jesting in the midst of hardships, smiling at pain, unmindful even of death."

Piatt would also help French Captain Aimé Doumenc and American Major Richard Mallet create the Reserve Mallet in 1917. The Reserve Mallet would be similar to the AFS, but instead of ambulances, it would drive supply and ammunition trucks that were desperately needed at the front.

== Congressman ==
Andrew was elected as a Republican to the Sixty-seventh United States Congress to fill the vacancy caused by the resignation of Willfred W. Lufkin; he was reelected to the Sixty-eighth and to the six succeeding Congresses and served from September 27, 1921, until his death.

He was a delegate to the Republican National Conventions in 1924 and 1928. In 1924, he proposed a bonus for World War I veterans.

He was a member of the board of trustees of Princeton University from 1932 to 1936.

== Personal life ==
Andrew, a lifelong bachelor, was in a lengthy relationship with his neighbor, interior designer Henry Davis Sleeper.

== Awards ==
He was made an officer in the Legion of Honor in 1927. He received the Army Distinguished Service Medal for his World War I service. He was named an Officer in Belgium's Order of Leopold. He was awarded the Croix de Guerre and named a Chevalier de la Legion of Honour in 1917 by the French government.

== Death and legacy ==
He died on June 3, 1936, in Gloucester, Massachusetts, at his home "Red Roof." The cause was attributed to influenza, from which he had been suffering for several weeks. The following day the United States House of Representatives adjourned at 2:55 p.m. to honor his death.

His remains were cremated and the ashes scattered from an airplane flying over his estate on Eastern Point in Gloucester.

In 1953, a bridge carrying Massachusetts Route 128 over the Annisquam River to the island section of Gloucester was named the "A. Piatt Andrew Bridge" in honor of his service as a congressman.

== See also ==
- List of members of the United States Congress who died in office (1900–1949)

Government offices
Preceded by Frank A. Leach	Director of the United States Mint; November 1909 – June 1910	Succeeded by George E. Roberts
U.S. House of Representatives
Preceded by Willfred W. Lufkin	Member of the U.S. House of Representatives from Massachusetts's 6th congressional district September 27, 1921 – June 3, 1936	Succeeded by George J. Bates
