= Willfred W. Lufkin =

American politician (1879–1934)

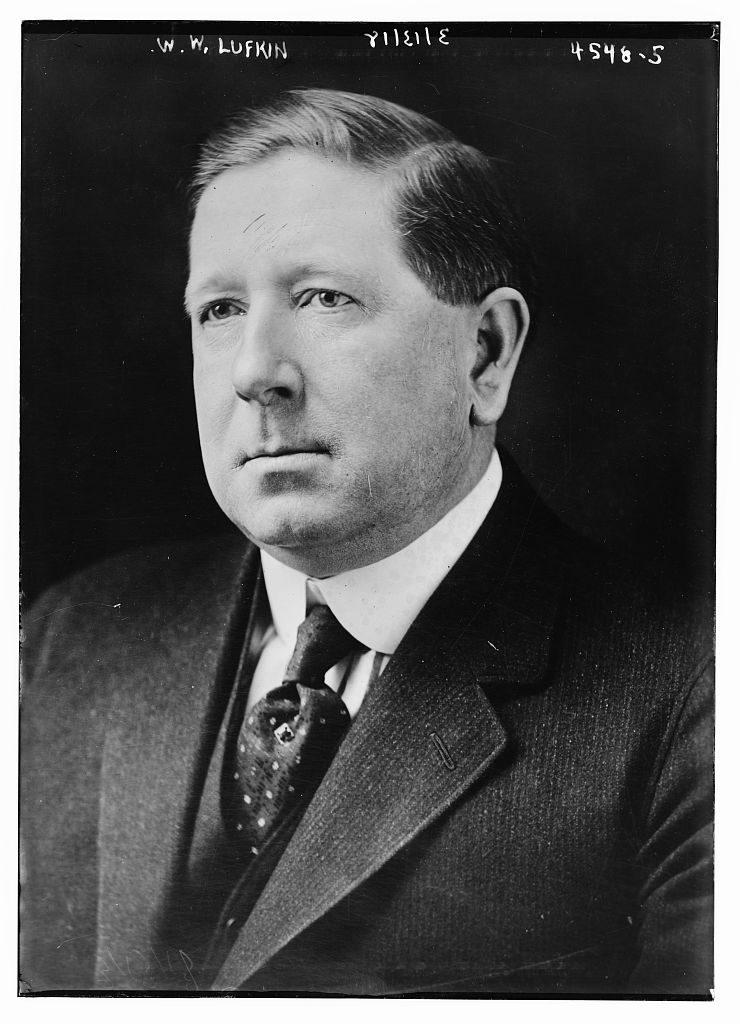
- Lufkin in 1918

Member of the U.S. House of Representatives from Massachusetts's 6th district
- In office November 6, 1917 – June 30, 1921
- Preceded by: Augustus Peabody Gardner
- Succeeded by: A. Piatt Andrew

Personal details
- Born: Willfred Weymouth Lufkin; March 10, 1879 Essex, Massachusetts, U.S.
- Died: March 28, 1934 (aged 55) Essex, Massachusetts, U.S.
- Resting place: Essex Cemetery
- Spouse: Georgia Story
- Children: Willfred Weymouth Lufkin, Jr., Constance G. Lufkin, Edith Lufkin, and Elizabeth Lufkin

Willfred Weymouth Lufkin (March 10, 1879 – March 28, 1934) was an American politician who served three terms as a United States representative from Massachusetts from 1917 to 1921.

== Biography ==
He was born in Essex on March 10, 1879. He attended public schools. After completing school, Lufkin was a newspaper correspondent and a private secretary to Congressman Augustus P. Gardner. He was a member and chairman of the Essex School Board and a member of the 1917 Massachusetts Constitutional Convention, which ran from 1917 to 1919.

=== Family ===
Lufkin married Georgia Story, daughter of Arthur and Margie Story.

=== 1917 Massachusetts Constitutional Convention ===
In 1916, the Massachusetts legislature and electorate approved a calling of a Constitutional Convention. In May 1917, Lufkin was elected to serve as a member of the Massachusetts Constitutional Convention of 1917, representing Massachusetts' 6th Congressional District.

=== Election to Congress ===
Lufkin was elected as a Republican to the Sixty-fifth Congress to fill the vacancy caused by the resignation of Congressman Augustus P. Gardner.

Lufkin was reelected to the Sixty-sixth and Sixty-seventh Congresses and served from November 6, 1917 to June 30, 1921.

== Later career ==
He resigned to become Collector of Customs for the Port of Boston on July 1, 1921 and served until his retirement in 1933. He was again elected a member of the Essex School Board and served as Town Moderator of the town meeting in 1925.

== Death and burial ==
Lufkin died in Essex on March 28, 1934. His interment was in Essex Cemetery.

== Bibliography ==
- Journal of the Constitutional Convention of the Commonwealth of Massachusetts (1919).
- Municipal History of Essex County in Massachusetts p. 324 (1922).

U.S. House of Representatives
Preceded by Augustus P. Gardner	Member of the U.S. House of Representatives from Massachusetts's 6th congressional district November 6, 1917 – June 30, 1921	Succeeded by Abram Andrew
Government offices
Preceded by Edmund Billings	Collector of Customs for the Port of Boston; 1921–1933	Succeeded by Joseph A. Maynard
