= Bob Edgett =

Canadian boxing coach (1930-2011)

Personal information
- Nationality: (Canada) Canadian
- Born: Robert Edgett; 1930 Midgic, New Brunswick, Canada
- Died: September 20, 2011 Sackville, New Brunswick, Canada
- Occupation: Boxing coach

Boxing career

Bob Edgett (1930 - September 20, 2011) was a Canadian former boxer and amateur boxing coach.

== Early life ==
Robert Edgett was born in 1930 in Midgic, New Brunswick, Canada.

After WWII, he was at sea with the Royal Canadian Navy from 1949 to 1951.

The amateur boxer started working for Corrections Canada as a guard at Dorchester Penitentiary in 1955. Edgett retired as a correctional officer in 1988.

== Amateur boxing career ==
At the age of 15 in 1945, Bob Edgett took up training with Mount Allison University and Academy students through their athletic program.

In his early bouts around Sackville-Amherst, he racked up twelve wins before losing to Lucky Abrams, then moved to Toronto for ten months, boxing out of the Diamond Boxing Club and at Massey Hall.

Edgett notably captured a three-round decision in Toronto in 1948 against Earl Walls, then the Canadian heavyweight champion and a top-ranked fighter worldwide. At the 1948 Central Ontario Championships, he claimed the light heavyweight crown and advanced to the Olympic Boxing Trials finals, falling to Eddie Zastre. Missing the 1948 Olympic team, he relocated to Montreal to train with Gus Mell, Johnny Greco, and Danny Webb. He won the Quebec Golden Gloves light heavyweight title at the Montreal Forum in 1949.

During his Canadian Navy service, he secured the Maritime light heavyweight championship in 1949 and 1950. He returned to the Montreal area in 1951 after leaving the navy.

His 1952 Olympic hopes ended when a kidney ailment kept him from competing. He returned from injury to take the Maritime Golden Gloves in 1954 at the Saint John Forum and added another Maritime heavyweight title in Halifax in 1956.

Edgett won the Maine State Championship in 1962 at the age of 32.

His career included a 90–15 record along with over 100 exhibition matches.

== Coaching career ==
Edgett established an amateur boxing club, known as Bob Edgett's Boxing Club (BEBC), in Sackville, New Brunswick, in June 1953. He launched his first club on the third floor of an aging building in Sackville. Following a year of operation, he shifted to Amherst. The club was regarded as one of the leading athletic organizations in the Maritimes. He expanded to four boys' clubs by December 1960 in Sackville, Dorchester, Amherst, and Wallace. His clubs extended to Big Cove, Rexton, Port Elgin, and Halifax.

At the 1987 Canada Winter Games, he coached the New Brunswick boxing team to two bronze medals.

Edgett trained Maritime boxers such as Les Sprague and Yvon Durelle. Over 6,000 young fighters benefited from his coaching, entirely free, during his career.

== Death ==
Bob Edgett died on September 20, 2011, in Sackville, New Brunswick, Canada, at age 81.

== Awards and recognition ==
- 1968 New England Golden Gloves Coach of the Year
- 1974 PEI Amateur Boxing Association Award
- 1977 New Brunswick Sports Hall of Fame inductee (builder)
- 1977 Canadian Boxing Hall of Fame inductee
- 1986 Moncton Sports Wall of Fame inductee
- 1989 Sackville Sports Wall of Fame inductee
- 2018 Multi-Ethnic Sports Hall of Fame Community Advocate Award
