= Charles Donahue (judge) =

American judge (1877–1952)

Charles Henry Donahue (December 7, 1877 – November 4, 1952) served as a justice of the Massachusetts Supreme Judicial Court from March 17, 1932, to April 26, 1944. He was appointed by Governor Joseph B. Ely.

Born in Milford, New Hampshire, to John F. and Bridget Murphy Donahue, he attended the local schools and graduated as valedictorian from Milford High School. He graduated third in his class from Dartmouth College in 1899, and then attended Boston University Law School, where he "completed the three-year course in two years and graduated in 1901".

On October 7, 1924, Governor Channing H. Cox appointed him to the Superior Court, and on March 17, 1932, Governor Ely elevated him to the position of Associate Justice of the Supreme Judicial Court. He served in this command until April 24, 1944, during which time he presented to the Governor in writing a request that he be retired from his judicial office, and on April 26, 1944, the late Justice Charles Henry Donahue, in accordance with such request, was retired by the Governor with the consent of the Executive Council.
