= John T. Priest =

American public servant (1843–1912)

Boston City Clerk
- In office January 5, 1908 – April 3, 1912
- Preceded by: Edward J. Donovan
- Succeeded by: James Donovan
- In office September 12, 1899 – December 27, 1899
- Preceded by: J. Mitchel Galvin
- Succeeded by: J. Mitchel Galvin (pro tempore)

Charlestown City Clerk
- In office 1871–1874
- Preceded by: Daniel Williams
- Succeeded by: Position eliminated

Personal details
- Born: March 13, 1843 Acton, Massachusetts
- Died: April 3, 1912 (aged 69) Roxbury, Boston
- Resting place: Forest Hills Cemetery
- Spouse: Harriet E. Priest (1875-1912; his death)

Military service
- Allegiance: United States
- Branch/service: 36th Massachusetts Volunteer Infantry; Union Army
- Years of service: 1862–1865
- Rank: Private
- Battles/wars: Battle of Cold Harbor

John Tenney Priest (1843–1912) was an American public servant who served as city clerk of Boston and Charlestown, Massachusetts.

== Early life ==
Priest was born on March 13, 1843, in Acton, Massachusetts, to John P. Priest and Sarah C. Davis. When he was twelve his family moved to Charlestown. He graduated from Charlestown High School in 1860 and worked for a time in a provision store. On August 5, 1862, he enlisted in the Union Army and was mustered into Co B, 36th Massachusetts Volunteer Infantry on August 26, 1862. On June 3, 1864, he received a gun shot wound at the Battle of Cold Harbor and lost one of his legs as a result. He was discharged for his wounds on June 17, 1865, and worked as a bookkeeper for a dry goods business upon his return home. On October 14, 1875, he married Harriet "Hattie" E. Beddoe.

== Government service ==
In 1866, Priest was appointed clerk of the Charlestown Common Council. In 1871 he became city clerk of Charlestown. In 1874, Charlestown was annexed by Boston and Priest became an assistant city clerk. On September 12, 1899, city clerk J. Mitchel Galvin suddenly resigned and Priest became acting city clerk. However, Priest had to undergo an operation on his amputated leg, which led to Galvin returning as city clerk pro tempore on December 27, 1899. Priest received some support on the common council to succeed Galvin, but Edward J. Donovan was ultimately chosen.

Priest again became acting city clerk following Donovan's death on January 5, 1908. The board of aldermen remained deadlocked on Donovan's successor until February 10 when, on the 30th ballot taken since Donovan's death, Priest was elected by six Republicans and two Democrats. On February 20, the Boston Common Council voted 40 to 32 to make Priest city clerk. His election was made possible by eleven Democrats who broke with their party and voted for Priest over their party's candidate, former Congressman William S. McNary. McNary's defeat was blamed on Ward 9 political leader James Donovan, who opposed McNary on political grounds. Priest remained city clerk until his death from Bright's Disease on April 3, 1912.
