= Secretary of the Commonwealth of Massachusetts =

Government office in Massachusetts

- Seal of Massachusetts

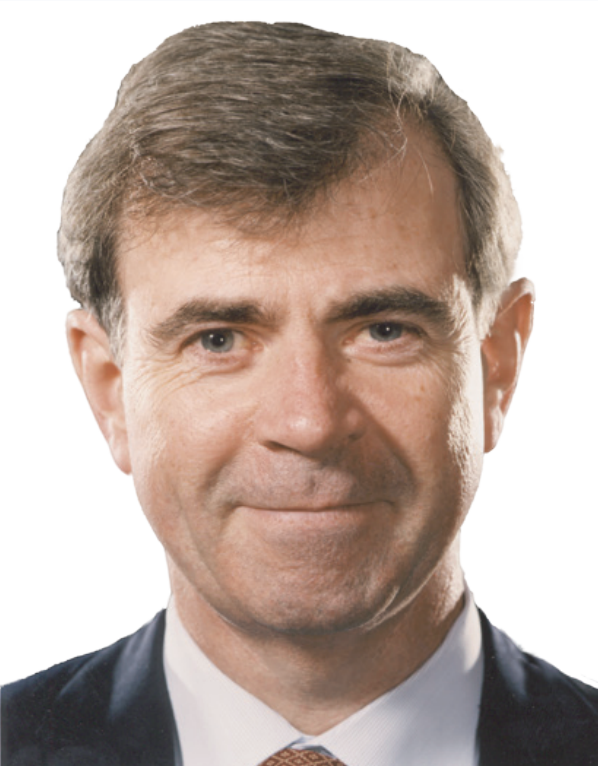
- Incumbent; William F. Galvin since January 1, 1995
- Government of Massachusetts
- Style: His Honor/Her honor
- Status: Chief administrator Registrar of deeds Records officer Constitutional officer
- Residence: None official
- Seat: State House, Boston, Massachusetts
- Nominator: Nominating petition, Political parties
- Appointer: Popular vote
- Term length: Four years, no limit
- Constituting instrument: Constitution of Massachusetts
- Formation: Original post: August 23, 1629; Current form: October 25, 1780
- Succession: Second
- Unofficial names: Secretary of State
- Website: www.sec.state.ma.us

The secretary of the Commonwealth of Massachusetts is a constitutional officer in the executive branch of the Commonwealth of Massachusetts. Originally appointed under authority of the English Crown pursuant to the Charter of the Massachusetts Bay Company, the office of secretary of the Commonwealth (equivalent to "secretaries of state" in other U.S. jurisdictions) became an elective one in 1780. (Note: Massachusett's Office of the Secretary of the Commonwealth is therefore the oldest operating secretary of state's office in the United States.) Twenty-seven individuals have occupied the office of secretary of the Commonwealth over the ensuing centuries. The incumbent is William F. Galvin, a Democrat who has held the office since 1995.

== Election ==
=== Term of office ===
The secretary of the Commonwealth is elected by the people on Election Day in November to four-year terms, and takes office on the third Wednesday of the January following a general election. There is no limit to the number of terms a secretary may hold. Institutionally speaking, the secretary of the Commonwealth is thus completely independent of both the governor and General Court for the purpose of performing their official duties. These constitutional protections notwithstanding, the secretary may still be impeached for misconduct or maladministration by the House of Representatives and, if found guilty, removed from office by the Senate.

=== Qualifications ===
Any person seeking election to the office of secretary of the Commonwealth must meet the following requirements:

1. Be at least eighteen years of age;
2. Be a registered voter in Massachusetts;
3. Be a Massachusetts resident for at least five years when elected; and
4. Receive 5,000 signatures from registered voters on nomination papers.

=== Vacancies ===
In the event of a vacancy in the office of secretary of the Commonwealth, the General Court is charged, if in session, with electing from among the eligible citizens of the Commonwealth a successor to serve the balance of the prior secretary's term in office. (Note: Citizens of the Commonwealth of the Massachusetts are officially designated as "Bay Staters". Being a Bay Stater implies concurrent U.S. citizenship, which is required in order to vote in Massachusetts and to run for any public office, including that of secretary of the Commonwealth.) If, however, the vacancy occurs while the General Court is not in session, then responsibility for appointing a successor falls to the governor. The appointment is not valid without the advice and consent of the Governor's Council.

== Powers and duties ==
The Secretary of the Commonwealth oversees the Corporations Division, the Elections Division, the Massachusetts Archives, the Massachusetts Historical Commission, the Public Records Division, the Securities Division, as well as the State Records Center.

== List of secretaries of the Commonwealth (1780–present) ==
No.	Secretary of the Commonwealth	Party	Years	Electoral/appointed history
1	John Avery, Jr.	Pro-Administration/Federalist	January 1, 1780 – June 7, 1806	Succeeded Samuel Adams, who had been Secretary of the Province of Massachusetts Bay from August 15, 1776, until January 1, 1780. Avery died in office, June 7, 1806.
2	Jonathan L. Austin	Democratic-Republican	1806 – 1808	[data missing]
3	William Tudor	Federalist	1808 – 1810	[data missing]
4	Benjamin Homans	Democratic-Republican	1810 – 1812	[data missing]
5	Alden Bradford	Federalist/National Republican	1812 – 1824	[data missing]
6	Edward D. Bangs	National Republican/Whig	1824 – 1836	[data missing]
7	John P. Bigelow	Whig	1836 – 1843	[data missing]
8	John A. Bolles	Whig	1843 – 1844	[data missing]
9	John G. Palfrey	Whig	1844 – 1848	[data missing]
10	William B. Calhoun	Whig	January 1848 – 1851	[data missing]
11	Amasa Walker	Whig	1851 – 1853	[data missing]
12	Ephraim M. Wright	Whig	1853 – 1856	[data missing]
13	Francis De Witt	Know Nothing	1856 – 1858	[data missing]
14	Oliver Warner	Republican	1858 – 1876	[data missing]
15	Henry B. Pierce	Republican	1876 – 1891	[data missing]
16	William M. Olin	Republican	1891 – April 15, 1911	Died in office April 15, 1911.
Acting	Isaac H. Edgett	Republican	April 15, 1911 – April 28, 1911.	Edgett, was the First Deputy Secretary of the Commonwealth under William M. Olin. As the First Deputy Secretary of the Commonwealth Edgett became the acting Secretary of the Commonwealth upon Olin's death. Edgett served as the acting Secretary of the Commonwealth until Albert P. Langtry was elected by the Massachusetts legislature to serve out the remainder of Olin's term.
17	Albert P. Langtry	Republican	April 28, 1911 - 1913	Elected by the Legislature, on April 26, 1911, to fill the vacancy caused by the death of William M. Olin. Langtry assumed the office of Secretary of the Commonwealth on April 28, 1911.
18	Frank J. Donahue	Democratic	January 15, 1913 – 1915	[data missing]
19	Albert P. Langtry	Republican	1915 – 1921	[data missing]
20	Frederic W. Cook	Republican	1921 – 1949	[data missing]
21	Edward J. Cronin	Democratic	1949 – November 24, 1958	Died in office on November 24, 1958.
Acting	J. Henry Goguen	Democratic	December 1, 1958 – January 20, 1959	[data missing]
22	Joseph D. Ward	Democratic	January 20, 1959 – 1961	[data missing]
23	Kevin H. White	Democratic	1961 – December 20, 1967	First elected in 1960. Re-elected in 1962. Re-elected in 1964 to a four-year term after the length of terms was extended. Resigned to become Mayor of Boston.
24	Jack Davoren	Democratic	1967 – 1974	[data missing]
25	Paul H. Guzzi	Democratic	1975 – 1978	[data missing]
26	Michael J. Connolly	Democratic	1979 – 1994	[data missing]
27	William F. Galvin	Democratic	January 1, 1995 – present	[data missing]

== See also ==
- Massachusetts Attorney General
- Political party strength in Massachusetts
