= Albert P. Langtry =

American politician (1860–1939)

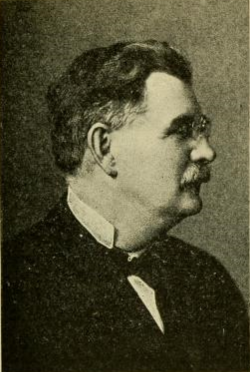

Massachusetts Secretary of the Commonwealth
- In office April 28, 1911 – 1913
- Governor: Eben Sumner Draper; Eugene Noble Foss
- Preceded by: William M. Olin
- Succeeded by: Frank J. Donahue
- In office 1915–1921
- Governor: David I. Walsh; Samuel W. McCall; Calvin Coolidge
- Preceded by: Frank J. Donahue
- Succeeded by: Frederic W. Cook

Acting Treasurer and Receiver-General of Massachusetts
- In office September 4, 1920 – September 8, 1920
- Preceded by: Fred J. Burrell
- Succeeded by: James Jackson

Member of the Massachusetts House of Representatives 5th Hampden District
- In office 1909 – April 27, 1911

Personal details
- Born: July 27, 1860 Wakefield, Massachusetts, U.S.
- Died: August 28, 1939 (aged 79) Melrose, Massachusetts, U.S.
- Party: Republican
- Spouse: Sarah C. Spear
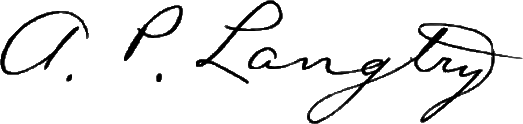
- Signature

Albert Perkins Langtry (July 27, 1860 – August 28, 1939) was an American newspaper editor and publisher, politician, Massachusetts Secretary of the Commonwealth, and a member of the Republican Party.

== Biography ==
Albert Perkins Langtry was born on July 27, 1860, in Wakefield, Massachusetts, the son of Joseph Langtry, the owner of a harness shop, and Sarah Jane Lakin.

With a grammar school education, Langtry started working as a boy in an office. He was married to Sarah C. Spear in 1886.

Langtry was a reporter for the Brooklyn Union and later became manager of the Long Island edition of the Brooklyn Times.

In 1890, Langtry moved to Springfield, Massachusetts and became editor and publisher of the Springfield Union and continued to manage that paper until 1923. During his tenure, he expanded the newspaper, adding morning and Sunday editions, and he instituted editorial policies that promoted the Republican Party. Langtry also served on the board of directors of The Associated Press from 1903 to 1906.

Langtry was a member of the Massachusetts Republican State Committee from 1903 to 1910. Langtry served as a member of the Massachusetts House of Representatives from 1909 to April 27, 1911.

== Secretary of the Commonwealth ==
Langtry was elected Secretary of the Commonwealth by the state legislature April 26, 1911. In the vote of the legislature Langtry defeated Democrat Frank J. Donahue 151 votes to 123. to serve the remaining term of William M. Olin, who died in office, Langtry took up his duties as Secretary of the Commonwealth on April 28, 1911, and he was elected to full term later that year He served until 1913 when he was defeated for re-election. He was elected Secretary of the Commonwealth again in 1915 and served until 1921.

== Acting Treasurer of Massachusetts ==
After Fred J. Burrell resigned as the Massachusetts Treasurer, Langtry, Henry A. Wyman and John R. Macomber served as a committee to administer the Treasurer's Office until the Governor's appointment of James Jackson could be confirmed by the Massachusetts Governor's Council.

== Return to journalism ==
In 1923 and 1924, Langtry purchased the two newspapers serving Waltham, Massachusetts, the Evening News and the Free Press Tribune. He combined the two papers into the Waltham News-Tribune (now The Daily News Tribune) and served as its publisher.

== Death ==
Langtry died at Melrose Hospital in Melrose, Massachusetts, on August 28, 1939.

== Publications ==
- Langtry, Albert P. ed., Metropolitan Boston: A Modern History 5 vols., New York, Lewis Historical Publishing (1929).
- Eliot, Samuel A., ed. (1911). Biographical History of Massachusetts. Boston, Massachusetts: Massachusetts Biographical Society. pp. Volume III. OCLC 6824260.
- Copeland, Alfred M. (1902). "Our County and Its People": A History of Hampden County, Massachusetts. Boston, Massachusetts: Century Memorial Pub. p. 437. OCLC 3075222.
- "THE STATES" (PDF). National Association of Secretaries of State.

== Notes ==
Party political offices
Preceded by William M. Olin	Republican nominee for Secretary of the Commonwealth of Massachusetts; 1911, 1912	Succeeded by William S. Kinney
Preceded by William S. Kinney	Republican nominee for Secretary of the Commonwealth of Massachusetts; 1914, 1915, 1916, 1917, 1918, 1919	Succeeded by Frederic W. Cook
Political offices
Preceded by William M. Olin	17th Massachusetts Secretary of the Commonwealth; 1911–1913	Succeeded by Frank J. Donahue
Preceded by Frank J. Donahue	19th Massachusetts Secretary of the Commonwealth; 1915–1921	Succeeded by Frederic W. Cook
