= William M. Olin =

American politician

William Milo Olin
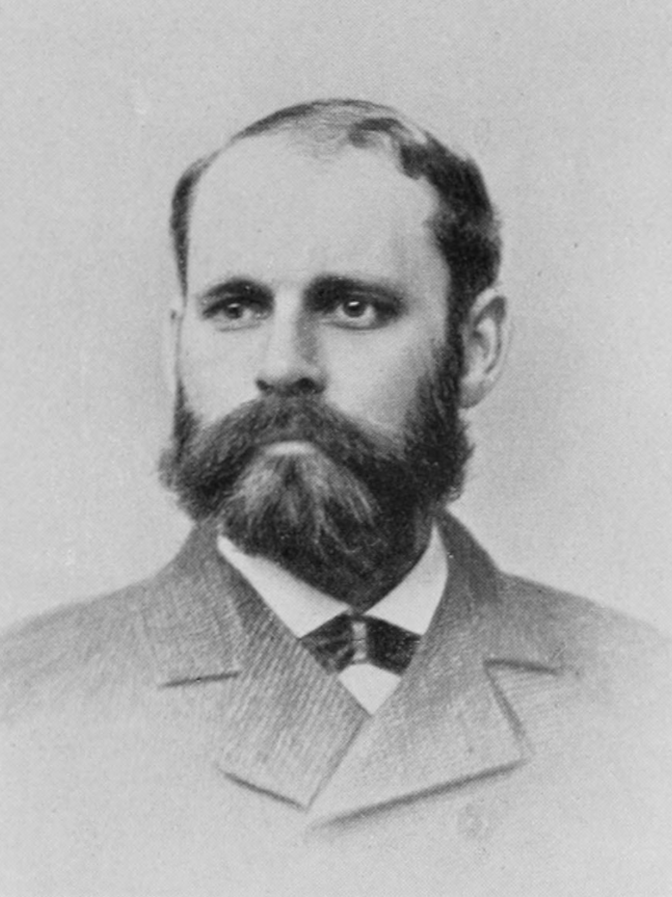

16th Massachusetts Secretary of the Commonwealth
- In office 1891 – April 15, 1911
- Governor: William E. Russell; Frederic T. Greenhalge; Roger Wolcott; Winthrop Murray Crane; John L. Bates; William L. Douglas; Curtis Guild Jr. Eben Sumner Draper; Eugene Noble Foss
- Preceded by: Henry B. Pierce
- Succeeded by: Albert P. Langtry

Personal details
- Born: September 18, 1845 Warrenton, Georgia
- Died: April 15, 1911 (aged 65)

Military service
- Allegiance: United States of America; Union
- Branch/service: Union Army
- Unit: 36th Massachusetts Volunteer Infantry
- Battles/wars: American Civil War

William Milo Olin (September 18, 1845 – April 15, 1911) was an American journalist and politician who served as the Massachusetts Secretary of the Commonwealth. Olin was born in Warrenton, Georgia to parents from Massachusetts, and in 1850 his family moved back to Massachusetts, where he attended school in Worcester and Grafton. Enlisting in the 36th Massachusetts Volunteer Infantry in 1862 during the American Civil War, he eventually rose through the ranks to lieutenant colonel, assistant adjutant general, and Adjutant General. After the American Civil Was Olin went to work for The Boston Advertiser. In the fourteen years Olin worked for the Advertiser he was, in succession, a reporter, editor and Washington, D.C. correspondent of that newspaper. He was later a private secretary to Massachusetts Governors Thomas Talbot and John Davis Long and U.S. Senator Henry L. Dawes. A Republican, he served as Massachusetts Secretary of the Commonwealth from 1892 until he died in Boston on April 15, 1911. At the time of his death, he was chief of staff of the National Grand Army of the Republic.

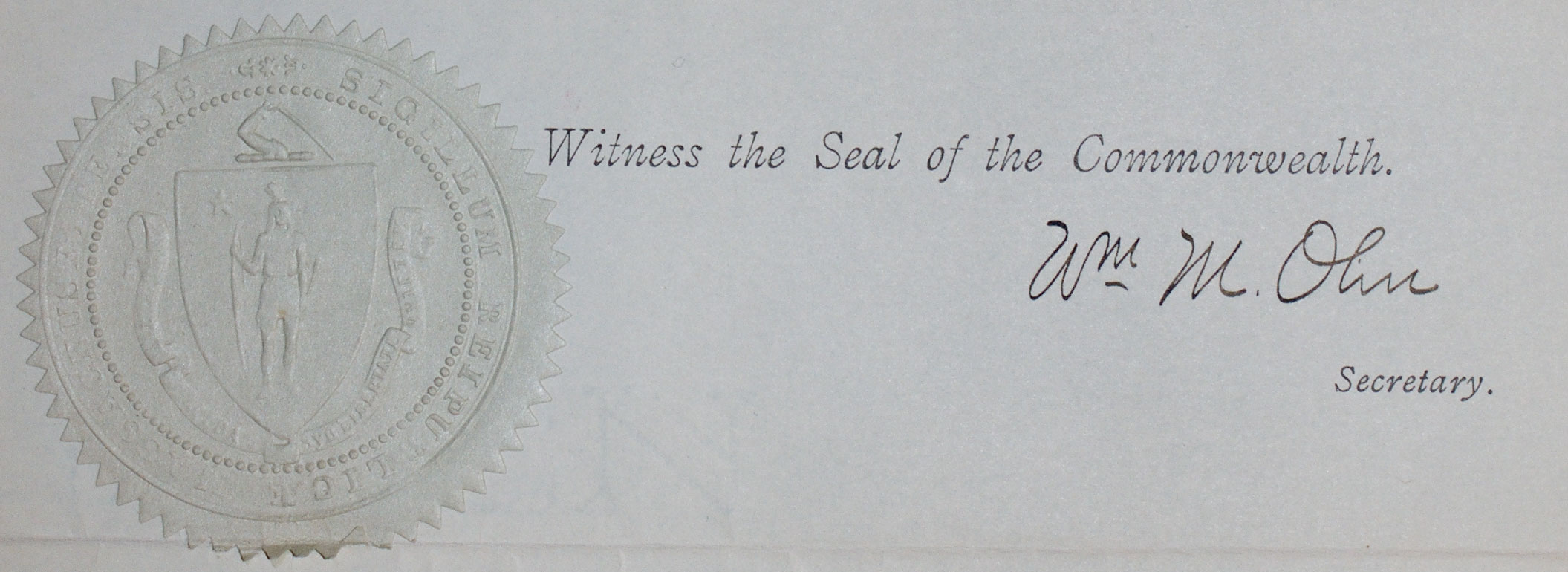
William M. Olin's signature from a document dated 1901 from the collection of H. Blair Howell.

Political offices
Preceded by Henry B. Pierce	16th Massachusetts Secretary of the Commonwealth; 1891–1911	Succeeded by Albert P. Langtry
