= Edward J. Donovan =

American politician (1864–1908)

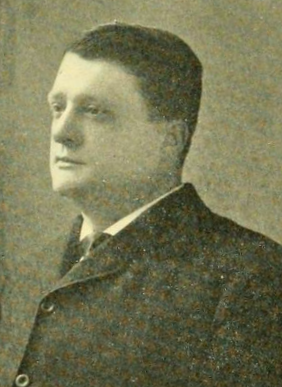

Boston City Clerk
- In office February 15, 1900 – January 5, 1908
- Preceded by: J. Mitchel Galvin
- Succeeded by: John T. Priest

Collector of Internal Revenue for Massachusetts
- In office March 15, 1894 – February 15, 1897
- Preceded by: Frank E. Orcutt
- Succeeded by: James D. Gill

Personal details
- Born: March 15, 1864 West End, Boston
- Died: January 5, 1908 (aged 44) Allston
- Spouse: Marjorie McGivney

Edward Joseph Donovan (1864–1908) was an American politician who served as Boston city clerk and Collector of Internal Revenue for Massachusetts.

== Personal life ==
Donovan was born on March 15, 1864, in Boston's West End. He graduated from The English High School. Donovan's father died when he was very young and he began working at a young age. He worked for Brown, Durrell & Co., a dry goods merchant, for many years, starting as an entry clerk and finishing as an accountant.

In 1891, Donovan married Marjorie McGivney. The couple moved to Allston shortly after their marriage. They had three sons and two daughters.

== Political career ==
Once he reached voting age, Donovan became involved in politics in Ward 8. He was the right-hand man of Martin Lomasney, who saw Donovan as his second brother. In 1885, Donovan was a founding member of The Hendricks Club and served as its first president, although Lomasney held the actual power.

Donovan was a member of the Massachusetts House of Representatives from 1887 to 1888 and represented the 3rd Suffolk district in the Massachusetts Senate from 1889 to 1890. He was the youngest member both of the House and Senate during his tenure there and at the age of 24 was the youngest man ever elected to the Massachusetts Senate. In 1891, Donovan was a candidate for Boston city clerk, but the common council selected J. Mitchel Galvin instead. In 1892 he was appointed to the Boston Health Board by Mayor Nathan Matthews Jr.

On January 29, 1894, President Grover Cleveland nominated Donovan for the position of Collector of Internal Revenue for the district of Massachusetts. He was confirmed on March 15, 1894 - his 30th birthday. He did not take office right away as he had been recovering from appendicitis. Donovan was an opponent of civil service reform, stating that it caused an "imminent danger" of creating "a great officeholding class that will take on the character of an arrogant bureaucracy". He fired all of the Republican employees in revenue office, including a number of Civil War veterans. On January 28, 1897, Donovan announced that he would be resigning effective February 15. It was believed that the incoming William McKinley administration would demand his resignation once it came to power. After leaving office, Donovan managed Star Brewery for a short time before going into the real estate and insurance business.

In 1899, Donovan returned to politics as a member of the Massachusetts House of Representatives. On January 18, 1900, the Boston common council elected Donovan city clerk. He was selected on the first ballot with 45 of 68 votes. He was supported by both Republican and anti-machine Democratic council members. The board of aldermen instead voted for Republican Frank J. O'Toole and the two sides remained deadlocked until February 12, when the board of aldermen capitulated and voted to appoint Donovan. He took office on February 15, 1900, and resigned his seat in the state legislature the same day.

Following Mayor Patrick Collins' death in 1905, Donovan entered the mayoral race as the candidate of the Hendricks Club. He officially declared his candidacy on October 16, 1905. He was opposed for the Democratic nomination by Congressman John F. Fitzgerald. Donovan was seen as the "machine candidate" as he had the support of Boston Democratic city committee president W. T. A. Fitzgerald and the majority of ward chairmen. He also had the endorsement of Acting Mayor Daniel A. Whelton. The New York Times described the race between Donovan and Fitzgerald as "the most bitter ever conducted in Boston" and described party leaders as "almost evenly divided in their preferences". Fitzgerald defeated Donovan 54% to 46%.

In October 1907, Donovan fell ill with bronchitis. Although he recovered his heart was severely weakened. On January 5, 1908, Donovan died from "valvular disease of the heart".

== See also ==
- 110th Massachusetts General Court (1889)
