= Apthorp =

Apthorp is a surname and may refer to:

- Benjamin Apthorp Gould (1824–1896), American astronomer
- Benjamin Apthorp Gould Fuller (1879–1956), American philosopher
- Charles Apthorp (1698–1758), American merchant and slave trader
- Frederick Apthorp Paley (1815–1888), English classical scholar
- John Apthorp (1935–2024), British businessman specializing in frozen food and alcoholic beverages
- John T. Apthorp (1769–1849), American banker
- Sarah Wentworth Apthorp Morton (1759–1846), American poet
- William Foster Apthorp (1848–1913), American music professor and critic
- William Lee Apthorp (1837–1879), American surveyor, military leader

== See also ==
- The Apthorp, apartment building in New York City
- Apthorp Farm, a one-time farm on the Upper West Side of Manhattan
- Apthorp's Island, Massachusetts
- Apethorpe, village in England
