= 1803–1804 Massachusetts legislature =

State law making body in Massachusetts USA

24th Massachusetts General Court
←	23rd	25th	→
- Seal of the General Court of Massachusetts

Overview
- Legislative body: Massachusetts General Court
- Term: May 25, 1803 – May 30, 1804

Senate
- Members: 40
- President: David Cobb
- Party control: Federalist

House
- Speaker: Harrison Gray Otis
- Party control: Federalist

The 24th Massachusetts General Court, consisting of the Massachusetts Senate and the Massachusetts House of Representatives, met in 1803 and 1804 during the governorship of Caleb Strong. David Cobb served as president of the Senate and Harrison Gray Otis served as speaker of the House.

== Composition by party ==
Resignations and new members are discussed in the "Changes in membership" section below.

Overview of Senate membership by party
	Party (shading shows control)		Total	Vacant
	Democratic- Republican (DR)	Federalist (F)	Total	Vacant
Begin (May 25, 1803)	13	26	39	1
May 25, 1803 (Note: David Tilden (DR) was elected by the House and Senate to fill the vacany left by John Codman (F), who died before the start of term.)	14	26	40	0
May 27, 1803 (Note: Elected to the Massachusetts Governor's Council at the start of term.)	14	20	34	6
Latest voting share	41.18%	58.82%		

== Leadership ==
=== Senate ===
==== Presiding ====
- President: David Cobb (F)

=== House of Representatives ===
==== Presiding ====
- Speaker: Harrison G. Otis (F)

== Members ==
=== Senate ===
The 40 seats are apportioned to each county or counties, based upon population size, to be elected at-large.

==== Barnstable ====
▌At-large. John Dillingham (DR)

==== Berkshire ====
▌At-large. John Bacon (DR)
▌At-large. Barnabas Bidwell (DR)

==== Bristol ====
▌At-large. Stephen Bullock (F) (until May 27, 1803)
▌At-large. Alden Spooner (F)

==== Cumberland ====
▌At-large. John Cushing (DR)
▌At-large. Woodbury Storer (F)

==== Dukes and Nantucket ====
▌At-large. Isaac Coffin (DR)

==== Essex ====
▌At-large. Elias H. Derby (F)
▌At-large. John Heard (F)
▌At-large. Nathaniel Marsh (F) (until May 27, 1803)
▌At-large. Benjamin Pickman (F)
▌At-large. Enoch Titcomb (F)
▌At-large. Dudley A. Tyng (F)

==== Hampshire ====
▌At-large. Samuel Fowler (F)
▌At-large. John Hastings (F) (until May 27, 1803)
▌At-large. John Hooker (F)
▌At-large. Ezra Starkweather (F)

==== Hancock, Lincoln and Washington ====
▌At-large. Alexander Campbell (F) (until May 27, 1803)
▌At-large. David Cobb (F)

==== Kennebeck ====
▌At-large. John Chandler (DR)

==== Middlesex ====
▌At-large. William Hildreth (DR)
▌At-large. Aaron Hill (DR)
▌At-large. William Hull (DR)
▌At-large. Jonathan Maynard (DR)

==== Norfolk ====
▌At-large. John Ellis (DR)
▌At-large. John Howe (DR)

==== Plymouth ====
▌At-large. Beza Hayward (F)
▌At-large. Isaac Thompson (F)

==== Suffolk ====
▌At-large. John C. Jones (F)
▌At-large. Jonathan Mason (F)
▌At-large. David Tilden (DR)
▌At-large. William Tudor (F)
▌At-large. Oliver Wendell (F) (until May 27, 1803)

==== Worcester ====
▌At-large. Daniel Bigelow (F)
▌At-large. Elijah Brigham (F)
▌At-large. Thomas Hale (F)
▌At-large. Salem Towne (F) (until May 27, 1803)

==== York ====
▌At-large. Simon Frye (F)
▌At-large. John Woodman (DR)

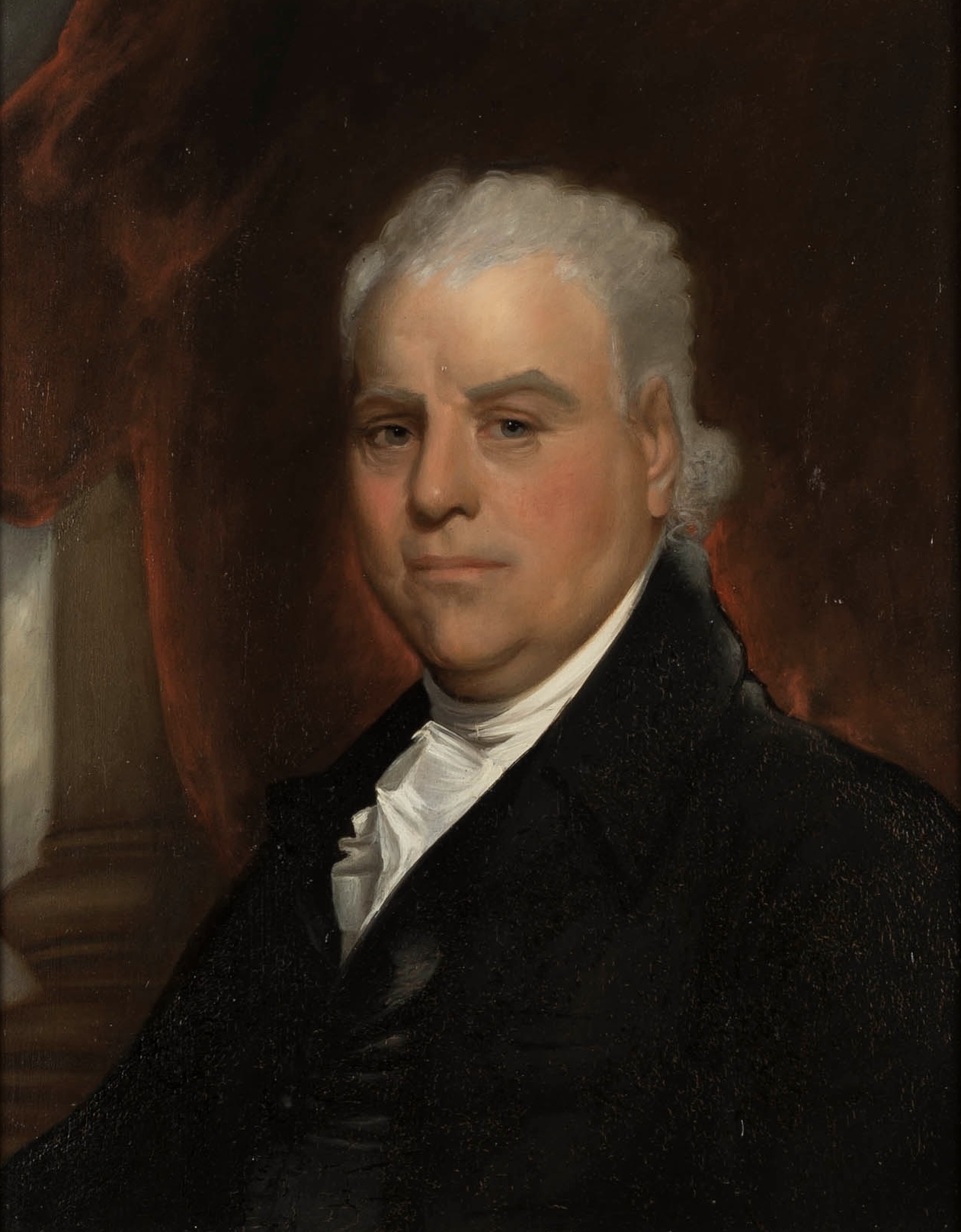
President of the Senate David Cobb (F) (Note: Unanimously elected by the Senate)

=== House of Representatives ===
The members of the House of Representatives are apportioned by incorporated township and therefore the number of representatives in the House of Representatives can vary. Every incorporated township that has at least 150 ratable polls (taxable persons) is given one representative and for every additional 225 ratable polls, another representative is given. Townships can choose not to send a representative to the House each session, therefore the total number of filled seats can fluctuate year-to-year.

==== Barnstable ====
▌Barnstable. Isaiah L. Green (DR)
▌Brewster. Isaac Clark
▌Chatham. Richard Sears
▌Falmouth. David Nye
▌Harwich. Ebenezer Broadbrook
▌Orleans. Richard Sparrow
▌Sandwich. William Bodfish
▌Yarmouth. Elisha Doane

==== Berkshire ====
▌Adams. Abraham Howland
▌Cheshire. Jonathan Richardson
▌Lanesborough. Gideon Wheeler (F)
▌Lenox. Elijah Northrup
▌Peru. (Note: Originally incorporated as Partridgefield) Cyrus Stowell (DR)
▌Pittsfield. Joshua Danforth
▌Richmond. Noah Roseter
▌Sandisfield. John Picket
▌Stockbridge. Jonathan Patten
▌Tyringham. Adonijah Bidwell
▌West Stockbridge. Enoch W. Thayer (DR)
▌Williamstown. William Young
▌Windsor. Amos Holbrook

==== Bristol ====
▌Attleborough. Ebenezer Tyler
▌Berkley. Apollos Tobey
▌Dartmouth. Holder Slocum
▌Dighton. George Walker
▌Easton. Abiel Mitchell
▌Freetown. Nathaniel Morton Jr. (DR)
▌New Bedford. Benjamin Church Jr.
▌Norton. Laban Wheaton (F)
▌Raynham. William A. Leonard
▌Rehoboth. Frederick Down
▌Somerset. Francis Borland
▌Swansea. (Note: Originally incorporated as Swanzey) Christopher Mason
▌Taunton. Jones Godfrey
▌Westport. Abner Brownell

==== Cumberland ====
▌Brunswick. John Durlap
▌Cape Elizabeth. Mark Dyer
▌Falmouth. Archelaus Lewis
▌Gorham. Lothrop Lewis (F)
▌Harpswell. Benjamin Dunning
▌Brunswick. John Durlap
▌Hebron. Samuel Paris (F)
▌Lewiston. John Herrick
▌Livermore. Cyrus Hamlin
▌New Gloucester. Joseph E. Foxcraft
▌North Yarmouth. James Prince (DR)
▌Paris. Josiah Bisco
▌Portland. William Symmes
▌Portland. Joseph Titcomb
▌Scarborough. Joseph Emerson
▌Windham. Peter T. Smith

==== Dukes ====
▌Edgartown. William Mayhew
▌Tisbury. Benjamin Allen

==== Essex ====
▌Amesbury. Christopher Sargent
▌Andover. Thomas Kitteridge (DR)
▌Beverly. Israel Thorndike (F)
▌Beverly. Joseph Wood
▌Boxford. Thomas Perley
▌Bradford. Nathanial Thurston (F)
▌Danvers. Gideon Foster
▌Danvers. Samuel Page
▌Gloucester. Daniel Rogers Jr. (DR)
▌Hamilton. Robert Dodge
▌Haverhill. Francis Carr (DR)
▌Ipswich. Jonathan Cogswell
▌Ipswich. Joseph Swazey
▌Ipswich. Nathaniel Wade
▌Lynn. Abner Cheever
▌Marblehead. Richard James (DR)
▌Marblehead. Nathan B. Martin (DR)
▌Marblehead. Joshua Prentiss (DR)
▌Marblehead. John Prince (DR)
▌Methuen. William Russ
▌Newbury. Josiah Little
▌Newburyport. Thomas Carter
▌Newburyport. Thomas M. Clark (F)
▌Newburyport. Mark Fitz (F)
▌Newburyport. Nicholas Johnson
▌Newburyport. Jonathan Marsh
▌Newburyport. Jeremiah Nelson (F)
▌Rowley. Moody Spafford
▌Salem. John Hathorne (DR)
▌Salem. Joseph Sprague (DR)
▌Salem. Jonathan Waldo (DR)
▌Salisbury. Jonathan Webster
▌Wenham. Samuel Blanchard

==== Hancock ====
▌Belfast. Jonathan Wilson
▌Castine. Oliver Mann
▌Frankfort. Abner Bicknell
▌Hampden. Martin Kinsley
▌Orrington. Oliver Leonard
▌Penobscot. Jeremiah Wardwell
▌Vinalhaven. William Vinal

==== Kennebec ====
▌Augusta. Samuel Howard
▌Hallowell. Nathaniel Perley
▌Pittston. Samuel Oakman
▌Winthrop. Nathaniel Banks

==== Middlesex ====
▌Acton. Asa Perlin
▌Billerica. James Abbot
▌Cambridge. Jonathan L. Austin (DR)
▌Charlestown. Matthew Bridge (DR)
▌Charlestown. Thomas Harris (DR)
▌Concord. Joseph Chandler
▌Dracut. Israel Hildreth
▌Framingham. Jonathan Maynard
▌Groton. Samuel Dana (DR)
▌Holliston. Ephraim Littlefield
▌Hopkinton. Timothy Sheppard
▌Lexington. Isaac Hastings
▌Lincoln. Samuel Hoar (DR)
▌Malden. Jonathan Oakes
▌Malborough. John Loring
▌Medford. Nathaniel Hall
▌Newton. Timothy Jackson (F)
▌Reading. James Bancroft
▌Sherburne. Daniel Whitney
▌Sudbury. Jonathan Rice
▌Watertown. Jonas White
▌Westford. Jonathan Carver
▌Weston. John Slack
▌Woburn. Loammi Baldwin (F)

==== Nantucket ====
▌Nantucket. Micajah Coffin (DR)

==== Norfolk ====
▌Bellingham. Laban Bates
▌Brookline. (Note: Originally incorporated as Brooklyn) Stephen Sharp
▌Canton. Joseph Bemis
▌Cohasset. Thomas Lothrop
▌Dedham. Ebenezer Fisher
▌Dorchester. Perez Morton (DR)
▌Franklin. John Boyd
▌Medfield. John Baxter
▌Medway. John Ellis
▌Milton. David Tucker
▌Needham. Jonathan Kingsbery
▌Randolph. Joseph White
▌Roxbury. Crowell Hatch
▌Roxbury. Joseph Heath
▌Roxbury. Willian Brewer
▌Stoughton. Lemuel Gay
▌Walpole. William Bacon
▌Weymouth. James Lovell
▌Wrentham. Nathan Comstock

==== Plymouth ====
▌Abington. Aaron Hobart
▌Bridgewater. Daniel Snow
▌Duxbury. Seth Sprague
▌Hanover. Albert Smith
▌Hingham. Nathan Rice
▌Kingston. Seth Drew
▌Marshfield. Elisha Phillips
▌Middleborough. John Tinkham
▌Pembroke. Nathaniel Smith
▌Plymouth. John D. Dunbar
▌Rochester. Elisha Ruggles
▌Scituate. Charles Turner Jr. (DR)

==== Suffolk ====
▌Boston. William Brown (F)
▌Boston. Jonathan Hunnewell (F)
▌Boston. John Lowell (F)
▌Boston. Harrison G. Otis (F)
▌Boston. Samuel Parkman (F)
▌Boston. John Phillips (F)
▌Boston. William Smith (F)

==== Washington ====
No representatives sent

==== York ====
▌Arundel. Thomas Perkins III
▌Berwick. John Lord (F)
▌Biddeford. Nathaniel Webster
▌Kittery. Mark Adams
▌Lyman. John Low
▌Saco. (Note: Originally incorporated as Pepperelborough) Samuel Scammon
▌Saco. Thomas G. Thornton
▌Waterborough. James Carlisle
▌Wells. Nathaniel Wells (F)
▌York. Samuel Darby

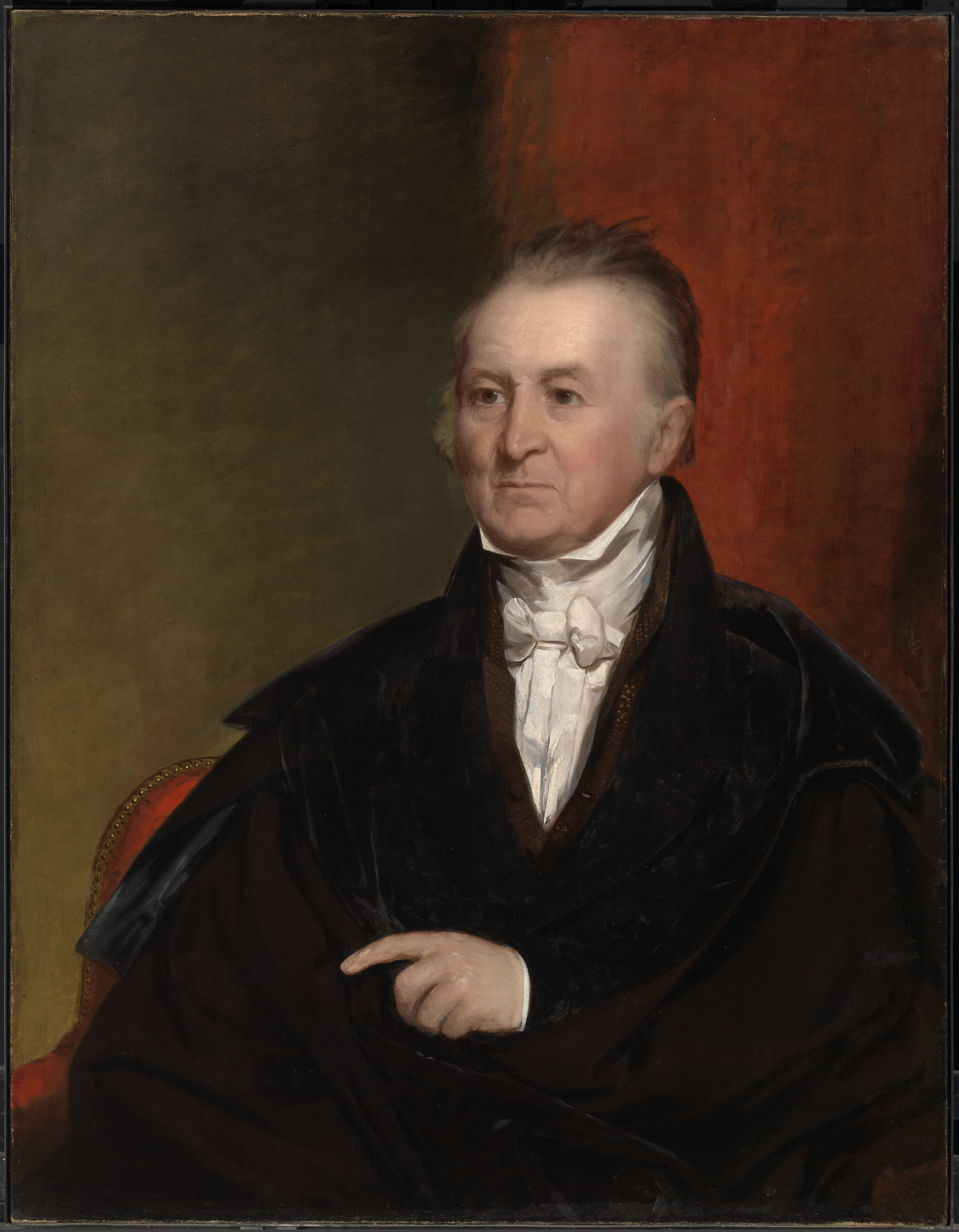
Speaker of the House Harrison G. Otis (F) Speaker Vote ▌Harrison G. Otis (F): 124 ▌Perez Morton (DR): 73 ▌Henry Knox (F): 2 ▌John Lowell (F): 1

== Committees ==
=== Standing Committees ===
Committee	Senate Members	House Members
Committee on Accounts	▌Isaac Thompson (F) ▌Thomas Hale (F)	▌Samuel Porter (F) ▌Stephen Monroe ▌Bezaleel Taft (F)
Committee on Applications for New Trials	▌Barnabas Bidwell (DR) ▌John Hooker (F)	▌William Ely (F) ▌William Symmes ▌Enoch W. Thayer (DR)
Committee on Applications for incorporation of Towns and Districts	▌Beza Hayward (F) ▌Elijah Brigham (F)	▌Lothrop Lewis (F) ▌Mark Langdon Hill (DR) ▌Josiah Little
Committee on Applications for incorporation of Turnpikes, Bridges and Canals	▌John Bacon (DR) ▌Alden Spooner (F)	▌Jonathan Smith (F) ▌Joseph Kendall ▌Lothrop Lewis (F)
Committee on Applications for incorporation of Parishes	▌Enoch Titcomb (F) ▌Jonathan Maynard (DR)	▌Hugh MacLellan (DR) ▌Nathaniel Webster ▌Timothy Jackson (F)
Committee on Applications for incorporation of Fisheries	▌Aaron Hill (DR) ▌John Cushing (DR)	▌Joseph Titcomb ▌Moody Spafford ▌Aaron Hobart

== Changes in membership ==
=== Senate ===
County	Vacated by	Reason for change	Successor	Date of successor's formal installation
Suffolk	Vacant	Incumbent John Codman (F) died before the beginning of this General Court. The House and Senate elected a replacement.	David Tilden (DR)	May 25, 1803

== Officers and officials ==
=== Senate officers ===
- Chaplain: Rev. William Emerson
- Clerk: Wendell Davis

=== House of Representatives officers ===
- Chaplian: Rev. Thomas Baldwin
- Clerk: Nicholas Tillinghast

== See also ==
- 8th United States Congress
- List of Massachusetts General Courts
