= 1801–1802 Massachusetts legislature =

American state legislature

22nd Massachusetts General Court
←	21st	23rd	→

Overview
- Legislative body: General Court
- Meeting place: State House
- Term: May 1801 – May 1802

Senate
- Members: 40
- President: David Cobb

House
- Speaker: Edward Robbins

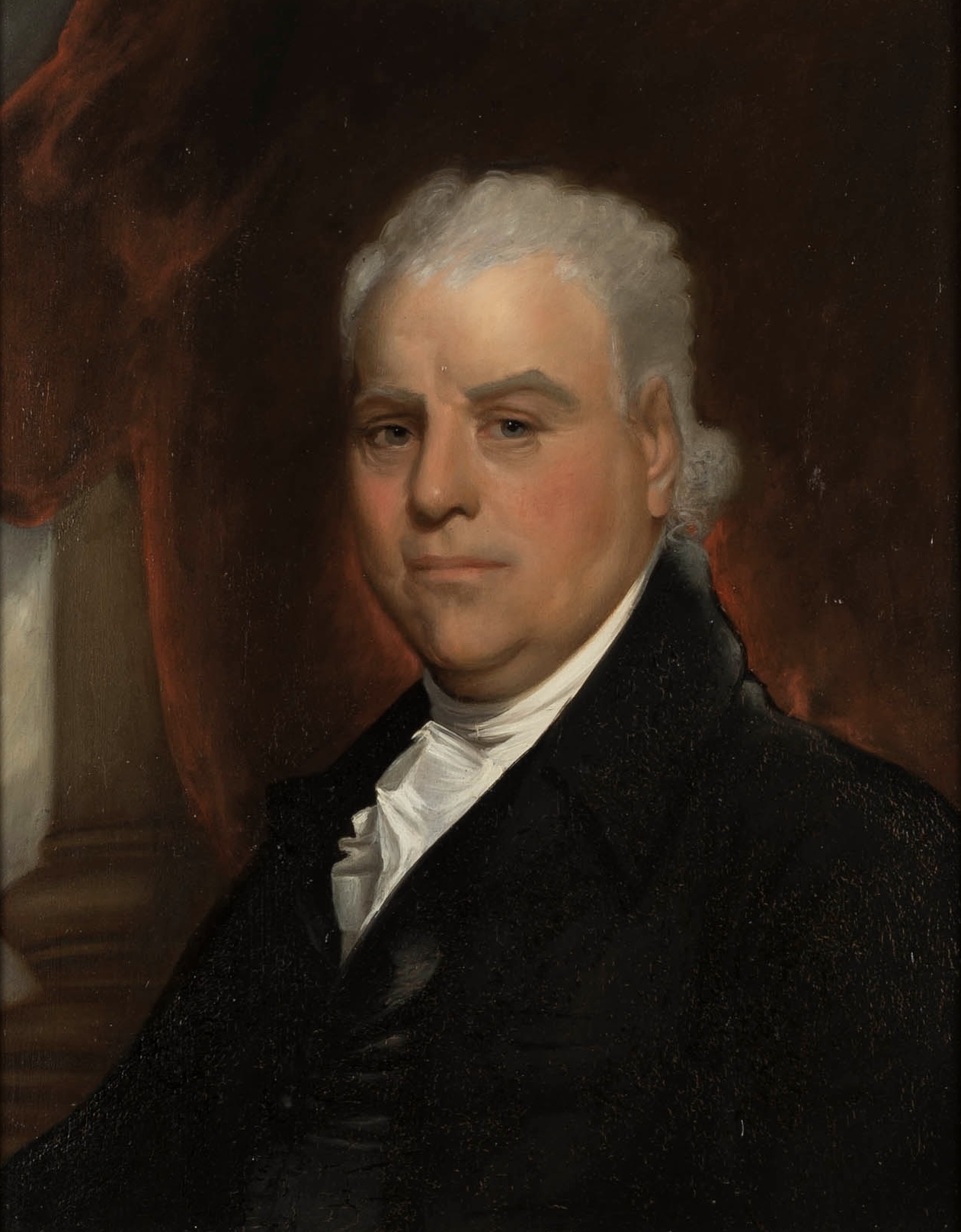
David Cobb, Senate president.

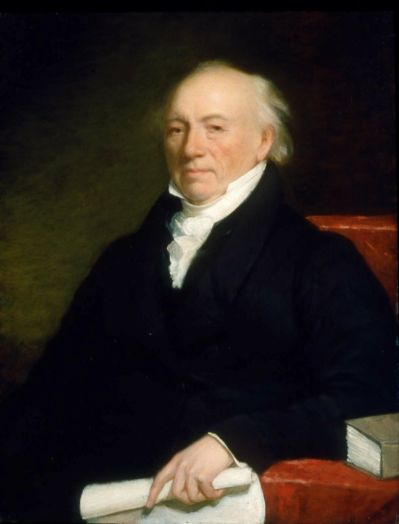
Edward Robbins, House speaker.

Leaders of the Massachusetts General Court, 1801-1802.

The 22nd Massachusetts General Court, consisting of the Massachusetts Senate and the Massachusetts House of Representatives, met in 1801 and 1802 during the governorship of Caleb Strong. David Cobb served as president of the Senate and Edward Robbins served as speaker of the House.

== Senators ==
- Benjamin Allen
- William Aspinwall
- Jonathan L. Austin
- Barnabas Bidwell
- John Billingham
- James Bowdoin
- Elijah Brigham
- David Cobb
- Jacob Crowninshield
- Josiah Deane
- Nathaniel Dummer
- Thomas Dwight
- John Ellis
- Samuel Fowler
- Simon Frye
- Thomas Hale
- Beza Hayward
- William Hildreth
- Aaron Hill
- Benjamin Hitchborn
- William Hull
- Ebenezer Hunt
- Stephen Longfellow
- John Lord
- Nathaniel Marsh
- Elisha May
- Jonathan Maynard
- Hugh McLellan
- Tompson J. Skinner
- Josiah Stearns
- Woodbury Storer
- Bezaleel Taft
- Isaac Thompson
- Enoch Titcomb
- Salem Towne
- John Treadwell
- William Tudor

== Representatives ==
- Joseph Whiton

== See also ==
- 7th United States Congress
- List of Massachusetts General Courts
