= 1807–1808 Massachusetts legislature =

American state legislature

28th Massachusetts General Court
←	27th	29th	→

Overview
- Legislative body: General Court
- Term: May 1807 – May 1808

Senate
- Members: 40
- President: Samuel Dana

House
- Speaker: Perez Morton

The 28th Massachusetts General Court, consisting of the Massachusetts Senate and the Massachusetts House of Representatives, convened in 1807 and 1808 during the governorship of James Sullivan. The term of this legislative body was significant in shaping the political landscape of the state during the early 19th century. Samuel Dana served as the president of the Senate, and Perez Morton served as the speaker of the House.

During this legislative session, key issues included economic regulation, infrastructure improvement, and the early development of Massachusetts' role within the emerging United States. The 28th General Court was also involved in the ongoing development of laws related to slavery, banking, and early industrialization. Despite the changes in national politics during this period, the Massachusetts legislature continued to assert its own political identity.

Senators

George Bliss

Elijah Brigham Peter C. Brooks Timothy Childs Isaac Coffin Samuel Dana Azariah Eggleston Ebenezer Fisher James Freeman Barzillai Gannet Christopher Gore William Gray Thomas Hale John Hastings John Heard William Hildreth Aaron Hill John Howe Levi Hubbard Jonas Kendall William King Jonathan Maynard Hugh McLellan James Means Nathaniel Morton Jr. Harrison Gray Otis David Perry John Phillips Jr. John Phillips William Spooner Seth Sprague Ezra Starkweather Joseph Storer Israel Thorndike Nathaniel Thurston Enoch Titcomb Salem Towne George Ulmer Nathan Willis

John Woodman

Representatives

The 28th Massachusetts General Court had a significant roster of representatives who played an influential role in shaping state law and policy. The composition of the House of Representatives during this period included figures from various regions of the state, representing both urban and rural constituencies. The balance of power between the House and Senate was reflective of the political tensions and evolving partisan divisions of the time. Many representatives were also involved in local governance, influencing the direction of Massachusetts politics at the time.

Some key representatives during the 28th session included:

Perez Morton (Speaker) – A leading figure in Massachusetts' political landscape. William King – A prominent figure in the Senate and House during the session. Christopher Gore – A well-known political figure in Massachusetts. George Ulmer – Known for his significant contributions to legislative debates during this period. Significant Legislation and Events The 28th General Court of Massachusetts passed several important pieces of legislation that would influence the state's development in the coming years. These laws dealt with issues such as:

Infrastructure development, including funding for roads and bridges. Economic policies related to early industrialization, taxation, and local economic development. Slavery laws and ongoing discussions about abolition, a significant issue in Massachusetts' political culture at the time. Judicial reforms aimed at improving the functioning of the state court system. This period also saw a continuation of Massachusetts' involvement in national debates, especially as the state navigated the changing political realities of the early 19th century.

== See also ==
- 10th United States Congress
- List of Massachusetts General Courts
- Massachusetts Senate
- Massachusetts House of Representatives
- Governor James Sullivan
- Harrison Gray Otis
- Perez Morton
