= 1804–1805 Massachusetts legislature =

American state legislature

25th Massachusetts General Court
←	24th	26th	→

Overview
- Legislative body: General Court
- Term: May 1804 – May 1805

Senate
- Members: 40
- President: David Cobb

House
- Speaker: Harrison Gray Otis

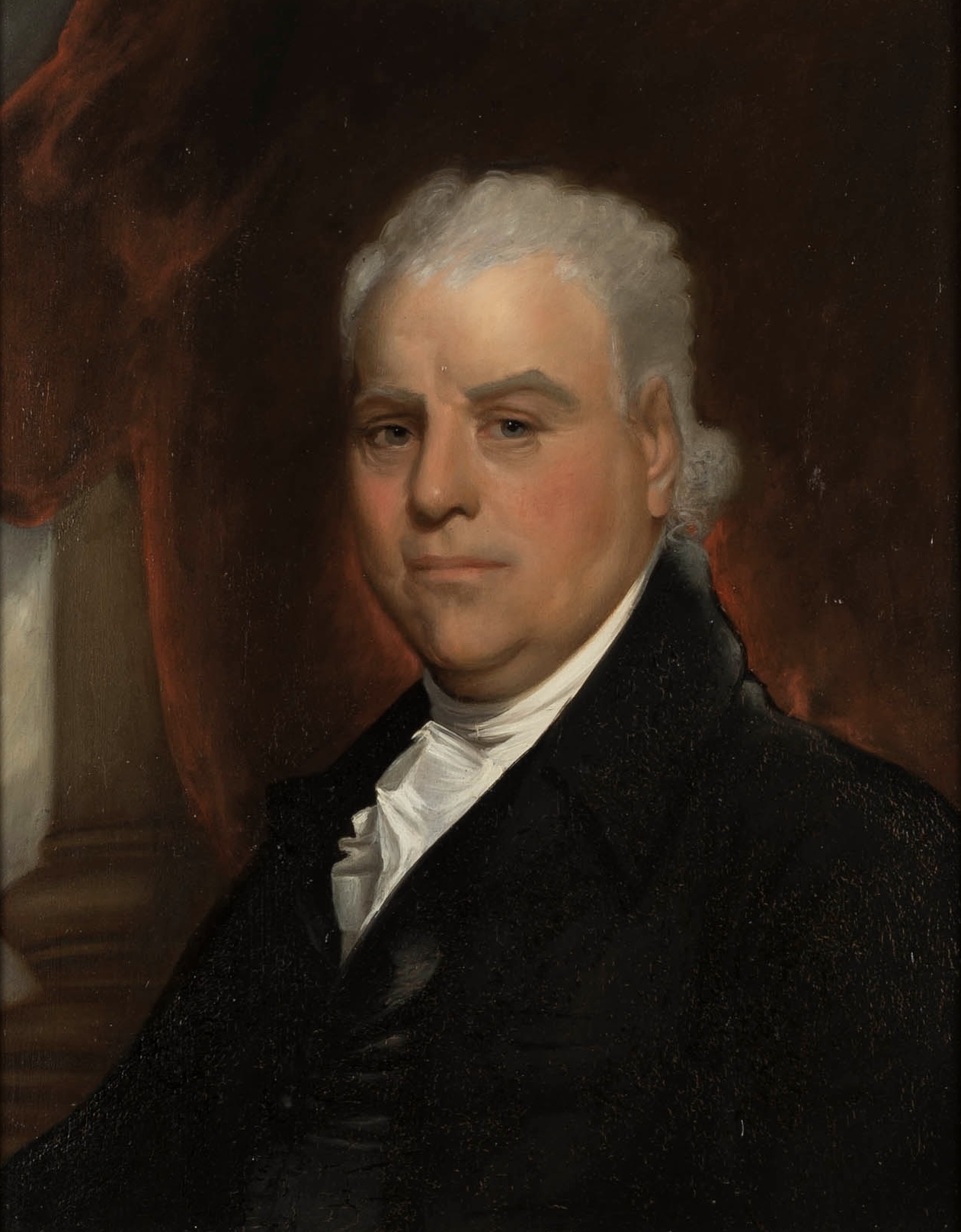
David Cobb, Senate president.

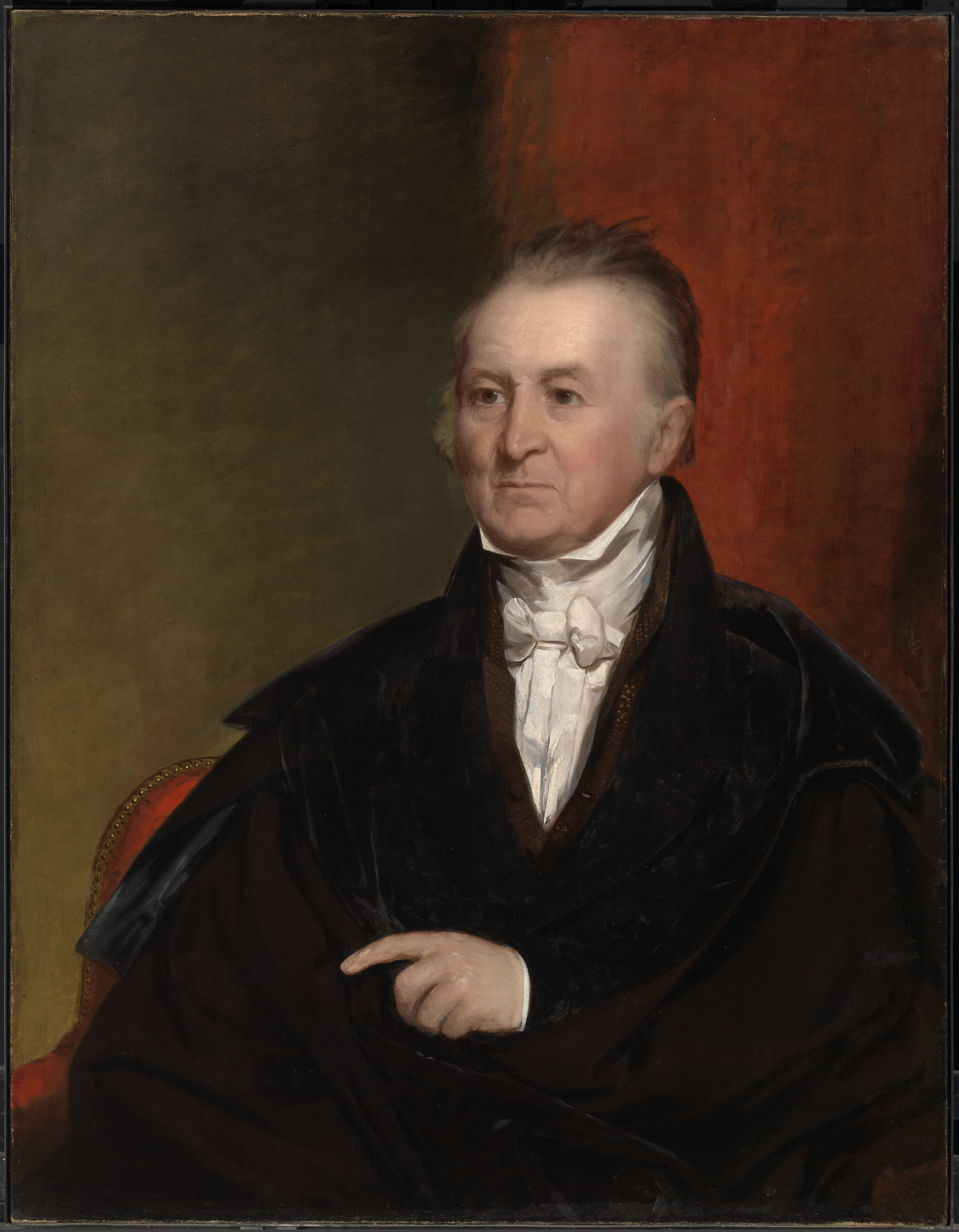
Harrison Gray Otis, House speaker.

Leaders of the Massachusetts General Court, 1804-1805.

The 25th Massachusetts General Court, consisting of the Massachusetts Senate and the Massachusetts House of Representatives, met in 1804 and 1805 during the governorship of Caleb Strong. David Cobb served as president of the Senate and Harrison Gray Otis served as speaker of the House.

== Senators ==
- John Bacon
- Joseph Bartlett
- Barnabas Bidwell
- Daniel Bigelow
- Elijah Brigham
- William Brown
- John Chandler
- Isaac Coffin
- John Cushing
- Josiah Dean
- Elias H. Derby
- John Ellis
- Thomas Hale
- Beza Hayward
- John Heard
- William Hildreth
- Aaron Hill
- Mark L. Hill
- John Hooker
- John Howe
- William Hull
- Jonathan Maynard
- Hugh McLellan
- Nathl. Morton Jr.
- John Phillips Jr.
- John Phillips
- William Prescott
- Josiah Quincy
- Joseph Russell
- Richard Sears
- Ezra Starkweather
- Woodbury Storer
- Isaac Thompson
- Enoch Titcomb
- John Woodman

== Representatives ==
- Joseph Whiton

== See also ==
- 8th United States Congress
- 9th United States Congress
- List of Massachusetts General Courts
