= 1806–1807 Massachusetts legislature =

Legislature in Massachusetts

27th Massachusetts General Court
←	26th	28th	→

Overview
- Legislative body: General Court
- Term: May 1806 – May 1807

Senate
- Members: 40
- President: John Bacon

House
- Speaker: Perez Morton

The 27th Massachusetts General Court, consisting of the Massachusetts Senate and the Massachusetts House of Representatives, met in 1806 and 1807 during the governorship of Caleb Strong. John Bacon served as president of the Senate and Perez Morton served as speaker of the House.

== Senators ==
- John Bacon
- Daniel Bigelow
- George Bliss
- Elijah Brigham
- Peter C. Brooks
- Timothy Childs
- Isaac Coffin
- Samuel Dana
- Josiah Dean
- Elias Haskel Derby
- John Ellis
- John Farley
- Thomas Fillebrown
- James Freeman
- Christopher Gore
- Thomas Hale
- John Hastings
- John Heard
- William Hildreth
- Aaron Hill
- John Howe
- Levi Hubbard
- Daniel Ilsley
- Jonathan Maynard
- Hugh McLellan
- Nathaniel Morton
- Harrison Gray Otis
- John Phillips Jr.
- John Phillips
- John Rowe
- Albert Smith
- William Spooner
- Ezra Starkweather
- Joseph Storer
- Nathaniel Thurston
- Enoch Titcomb
- Salem Town
- George Ulmer
- Nathan Willis
- John Woodman

== Representatives ==
- Jonathan Mason

== See also ==
- 9th United States Congress
- 10th United States Congress
- List of Massachusetts General Courts
