= 1802–1803 Massachusetts legislature =

American state legislature

23rd Massachusetts General Court
←	22nd	24th	→

Overview
- Legislative body: General Court
- Term: May 1802 – May 1803

Senate
- Members: 40
- President: David Cobb

House
- Speaker: John Coffin Jones

The 23rd Massachusetts General Court, consisting of the Massachusetts Senate and the Massachusetts House of Representatives, met in 1802 and 1803 during the governorship of Caleb Strong. David Cobb served as president of the Senate and John Coffin Jones served as speaker of the House.

== Senators ==
- Peleg Coffin
- William Tudor

== Representatives ==
- John C. Jones
- Samuel Parkman

== See also ==
- 7th United States Congress
- 8th United States Congress
- List of Massachusetts General Courts
