= 1805–1806 Massachusetts legislature =

American state legislature

26th Massachusetts General Court
| ← | 25th | 27th | → |

Overview
- Legislative body: General Court
- Term: May 1805 – May 1806

Senate
- Members: 40
- President: Harrison Gray Otis

House
- Speaker: Timothy Bigelow

The 26th Massachusetts General Court, consisting of the Massachusetts Senate and the Massachusetts House of Representatives, met in 1805 and 1806 during the governorship of Caleb Strong. Harrison Gray Otis served as president of the Senate and Timothy Bigelow served as speaker of the House.

== Senators ==
- John Bacon
- Daniel Bigelow
- George Bliss
- Elijah Brigham
- William Brown
- Timothy Childs
- Isaac Coffin
- John Cushing
- Samuel Dana
- Josiah Dean
- Elias H. Derby
- John Dillingham
- John Ellis
- John Farley
- Joshua Fisher
- Thomas Hale
- John Hastings
- John Heard
- William Hildreth
- Aaron Hill
- John Howe
- Joseph Leland
- Nathaniel Marsh
- Jonathan Maynard
- Hugh McLellan
- Nathaniel Morton Jr.
- Harrison Gray Otis
- Thomas H. Perkins
- John Phillips Jr.
- John Phillips
- Albert Smith
- Ezra Starkweather
- Woodbury Storer
- Enoch Titcomb
- Salem Towne
- George Ulmer
- Oliver Wendell
- Nathan Weston
- Nathan Willis
- John Woodman

== See also ==
- 9th United States Congress
- List of Massachusetts General Courts
