= 1808–1809 Massachusetts legislature =

American state legislature

29th Massachusetts General Court
←	28th	30th	→

Overview
- Legislative body: General Court
- Meeting place: Massachusetts State House, Boston
- Term: May 1808 – May 1809
- Election: 1808 Massachusetts elections

Senate
- Members: 40
- President: Harrison Gray Otis

House
- Speaker: Timothy Bigelow

The 29th Massachusetts General Court, consisting of the Massachusetts Senate and the Massachusetts House of Representatives, met in Boston from May 1808 to May 1809 during the governorship of Levi Lincoln Sr.. Harrison Gray Otis served as president of the Senate and Timothy Bigelow served as speaker of the House.

The legislative session occurred during a period of political conflict in Massachusetts over the embargo policies enacted under President Thomas Jefferson. Federalists in Massachusetts strongly opposed the Embargo Act of 1807, arguing that it severely harmed New England shipping and maritime commerce. Although Governor Lincoln was affiliated with the Democratic-Republican Party, the General Court remained largely controlled by Federalists.

During the session, the legislature elected James Lloyd as the Class 1 United States senator from Massachusetts following the resignation of John Quincy Adams. Adams had become politically isolated after supporting aspects of Jefferson's foreign policy and the embargo policy opposed by many Massachusetts Federalists.

== Political composition ==
The General Court during the 1808–1809 legislative session was dominated by the Federalist Party. Massachusetts remained one of the principal centers of Federalist political influence in the early nineteenth century, especially among merchants and commercial interests in Boston and the coastal towns.

Debate during the session reflected wider national disagreements over trade restrictions, maritime commerce, and relations with Great Britain and France during the Napoleonic Wars.

== Major events ==
One of the most significant political developments associated with the 29th General Court was the election of James Lloyd to the United States Senate in 1808. Lloyd succeeded John Quincy Adams, who resigned after losing support among Massachusetts Federalists because of his independent political positions.

The legislature also addressed matters relating to taxation, militia organization, transportation infrastructure, and commercial regulation during a period of economic uncertainty caused by declining maritime trade.

== Senators ==
- Eli P. Ashmun
- Amos Bond
- Elijah Brigham
- Peter C. Brooks
- Joseph S. Buckminster
- Timothy Childs
- Samuel Dana
- Joseph Dimmick
- Azariah Eggleston
- Ebenezer Fisher
- Barzillai Gannett
- William Gray
- Thomas Hale
- John Heard
- Aaron Hill
- John How
- Gorham G. Hussey
- Jonas Kendall
- William King
- Samuel Lathrop
- Joseph Leland
- Lothrop Lewis
- Theodore Lincoln
- James Lloyd, Jr.
- Hugh McLellan
- Ammi R. Mitchell
- Nathaniel Morton Jr.
- Harrison G. Otis
- David Perry
- John Phillips
- John Phillips, Jr.
- Samuel Putnam
- William Spooner
- Seth Sprague
- Ezra Starkweather
- Nathaniel Thurston
- Enoch Titcomb
- Salem Towne
- J. L. Tuttle
- Nathan Willis
- John Woodman

== Representatives ==
- Christopher Gore
- Benjamin Bussey

== See also ==
- 10th United States Congress
- 11th United States Congress
- 1808 United States Senate election in Massachusetts
- List of Massachusetts General Courts
