= Harry Coster =

American clubman (c. 1840–1917)

- Born: Henry Arnold Coster c. 1840; New York, U.S.
- Died: November 2, 1917 (aged 76–77); St. Adresse, Westchester, New York, U.S.
- Spouse: Mary Lee Coles (m. 1866)
- Relatives: John Gerard Coster (grandfather)

Henry Arnold Coster (Note: Coster was named after his uncle, Henry Arnold Coster, who was named after his uncle, Henry Arnold Coster (d. 1821).) (c. 1840 – November 2, 1917) was an American clubman who was prominent in New York Society during the Gilded Age.

== Early life ==
Coster was the son of Daniel Joachim Coster and Julia (née DeLancey) Coster (1806–1890), who married in 1835 and lived at 234 West 14th Street. His father became a member of the auction firm of Hone & Coster. They established the family estate in Westchester (which became part of the Bronx in 1895).

His paternal grandparents were Catherine Margaret (née Holsman) Coster and John Gerard Coster, who came to the United States shortly after the Revolutionary War from Haarlem in the Netherlands and founded the family fortune with his brother through the mercantile firm, "Henry A. & John G. Coster", and died in 1844. His grandparents had twelve children that married into many prominent families including the Schermerhorns and Heckshers. His paternal uncles included Gerard H. Coster who married Matilda Prime (a daughter of banker Nathaniel Prime), George Washington Coster who married Elizabeth Oakey (a daughter of merchant Daniel Oakey), and his aunt was Georgiana Louisa Coster, who married Charles August Heckscher. Among his many first cousins was Charles Henry Coster and John Gerard Heckscher.

His maternal grandfather was Oliver Delancey of the Delancey family, (Note: Coster's grandfather, Oliver Delancey, was the son of Peter Delancey and the grandson of Huguenot immigrant and merchant Stephen Delancey. His grandfather was also the brother-in-law of Thomas Henry Barclay, and the nephew of Lt. Gov. of New York James DeLancey and British Army Brig. Gen. Oliver Delancey and the maternal grandson of Cadwallader Colden, the Colonial Governor of New York.) which was one of the oldest families in New York state. His paternal uncles included Daniel Delancey and John Delancey, who later owned part of the Coster Estate in Westchester.

== Society life ==
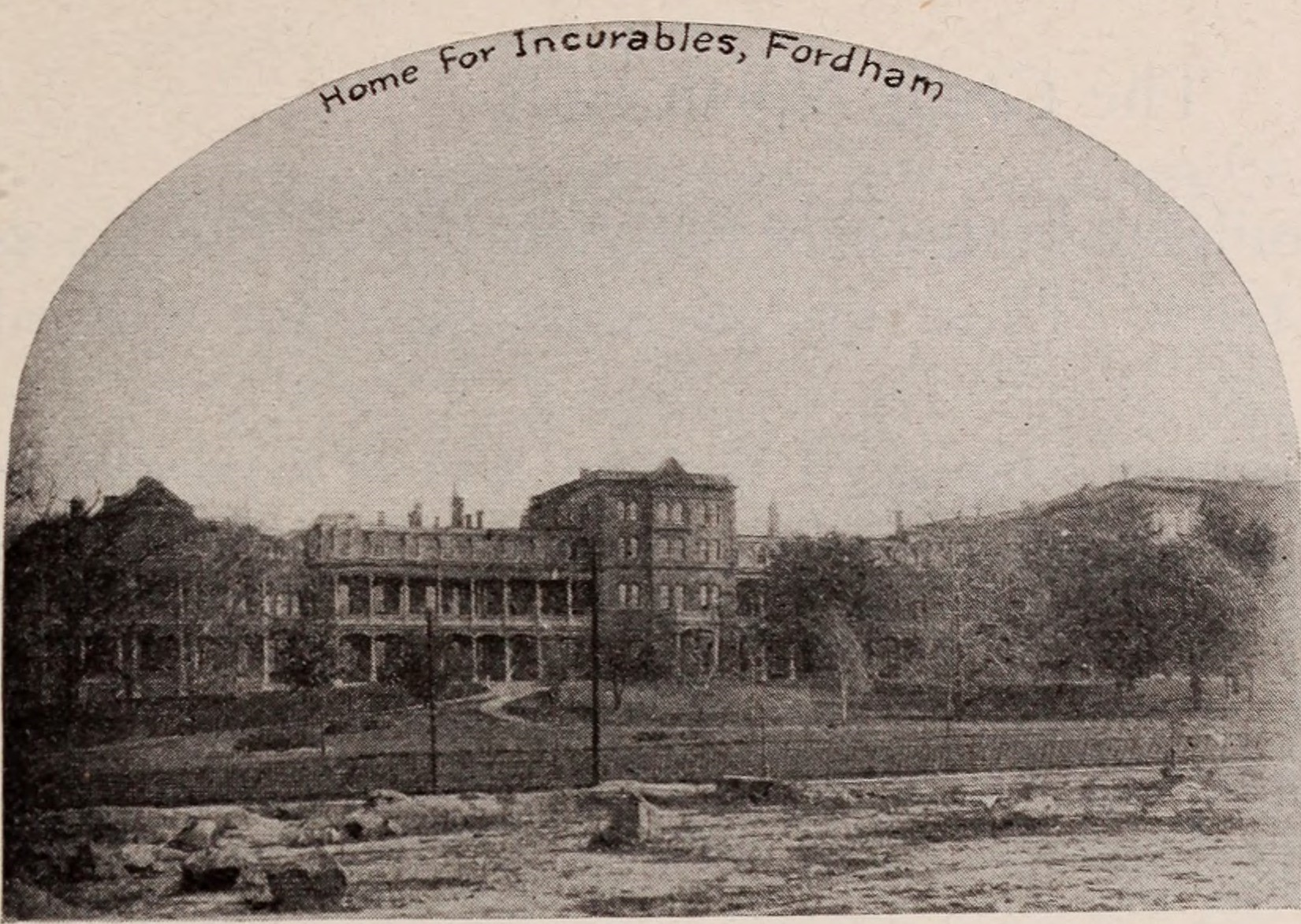
Home for Incurables, Fordham, Bronx

In 1892, Coster was included in Ward McAllister's "Four Hundred", purported to be an index of New York's best families, published in The New York Times. Conveniently, 400 was the number of people that could fit into Mrs. Astor's ballroom. Coster was a member of the St. Nicholas Society.

The Coster's spent their summers in Newport, Rhode Island. His wife, who was prominent in society in Boston before their marriage, Mary served as vice-president of the Home for Incurables in Fordham.

== Personal life ==
On December 6, 1866, Coster was married to Mary Lee Coles (c. 1842–1922). She was the daughter of Isaac Underhill Coles and Martha Ellery (née Jones) Coles, who married in Boston in July 1823. (Note: Mary's mother, Martha Ellery (née Jones) Coles was the youngest daughter of John Coffin Jones Sr. (1750–1829), the Speaker of the Massachusetts House of Representatives. Martha's older brother was John Coffin Jones Jr. (1796–1861), the first U.S. Consul to the Kingdom of Hawaii, and her older sister was Margaret Champlin Jones (1792–1848), who married Benjamin Underhill Coles, her husband's brother.) Her sister, Grace Coles was married to Edward Templeton Snelling. They lived in New York at 2 East 41st Street and at their country home, known as "St. Adresse", in Westchester County, New York. Together, Harry and Mary were the parents of:

- Martha Ellery Coster (d. 1955), who married Frederick S. Wombwell, a British citizen living in Asheville, North Carolina, in 1923. (Note: At the wedding, Martha's brother Oliver walked her down the aisle, Frederick's best man was his brother Carlisle Wombwell, and Edward Coster Wilmerding (sister of Georgiana Wilmerding) and Harry H. Benkard were their ushers.) After their marriage, they lived at 103 East 75th Street.
- Oliver de Lancey Coster (c. 1872–1947), who married Mary E. (née Coppell) Booth (1869–1937), the widow of Edgar Hetfield Booth, in 1913. Her father, George Coppell, was the British Consul at New Orleans during the U.S. Civil War. (Note: Coppell, who lived at 40 Fifth Avenue and The Towers in Tenafly, was also the namesake of Coppell, Texas. Mary's first husband was the wealthy Edgar Hetfield Booth (1861–1904).) They lived at Keewaydin in Tenafly, New Jersey. After Mary's death in 1937, Oliver remarried to Pauline Cory in 1939.

Coster died at his country home in Westchester on November 2, 1917. His widow, who had a summer home in Southampton, New York known as "Wee Cot", died in November 1922 at her residence, 50 East 81st Street, which she inherited from her husband. Her funeral was held at St. James' Episcopal Church on Madison Avenue and she was buried alongside her husband at the Coster family vault in the churchyard of St. Peter's Church in the Village of Westchester (which is now the East Bronx).

After Coster's death, his children auctioned off his estate with the Parish of St. Benedict's purchasing the family mansion in 1929 who used it as a schoolhouse until the Coster Mansion was torn down in 1930 and a new school was built in its place on Edison Avenue. To this day, St. Benedict's School stands on the same site.
