= Rancho Thompson =

Mexican land grant in California

Rancho Thompson Eight Leagues on Stanislaus River
- Mexican land grant
- Location of Riverbank in the state of California

- Location in the United States
- Coordinates: 37.800°N 120.890°W
- Elevation: 43 m (141 ft)

Rancho Thompson (also called "Eight Leagues on Stanislaus River") was a 35,533-acre (143.80 km^{2}) Mexican land grant in present-day San Joaquin County and Stanislaus County, California given in 1846 by Governor Pío Pico to Alpheus Basil Thompson. The rectangular grant was 2 leagues (6.0 miles; 9.7 kilometres) along both sides of the Stanislaus River by 4 leagues (12 miles; 19 kilometres) – mostly north of the river. The grant encompassed present-day Riverbank and Oakdale.

== History ==
Captain Alpheus Basil Thompson (1795–1869) was a seagoing merchant from Brunswick, Maine who settled in Santa Barbara in 1834. Thompson owned the ships Loriot and the Bolívar Liberator, trading between the China and California. Thompson married Francisca Carrillo, daughter of Carlos Antonio Carrillo, Governor of Alta California from 1837 to 1838. Thomson and his shipping partner and brother-in-law, John Coffin Jones, Jr. (1796–1861), entered into a partnership to manage their Santa Rosa Island, California land grant. A legal battle between Thompson and Jones began in 1856, and the acrimonious Thompson-Jones partnership ended in 1859.

With the cession of California to the United States following the Mexican-American War, the 1848 Treaty of Guadalupe Hidalgo provided that the land grants would be honored. As required by the Land Act of 1851, a claim for Rancho Thompson was filed with the Public Land Commission in 1852, and the grant was patented to Alpheus Basil Thompson in 1858.

Thompson sold an undivided seven-tenths to Gabriel B. Post of G. B. Post & Co., San Francisco, and the remaining three-tenths to the law firm of Halleck, Peachy & Billings. Post & Co. went bankrupt, and Halleck, Peachy & Billings now owned the entire grant. The grant was sold off in small pieces from 1858 to 1862.
