= James T. Austin =

American politician (1784–1870)

James Trecothick Austin

22nd Massachusetts Attorney General
- In office 1832–1843
- Governor: Levi Lincoln Jr. John Davis; Samuel Turell Armstrong; Edward Everett; Marcus Morton
- Preceded by: Perez Morton
- Succeeded by: John H. Clifford (From 1849; Office Abolished from 1843–1849)

Suffolk County, Massachusetts Attorney
- In office 1812–1832
- Preceded by: Position created
- Succeeded by: Samuel D. Parker

Personal details
- Born: January 7, 1784 Boston, Massachusetts, U.S.
- Died: May 8, 1870 (aged 86) Boston, Massachusetts, U.S.
- Party: Anti-Federalist, National Republican Party
- Spouse: Catharine Gerry
- Children: Ivers James Austin (1808–1889); Marie Cornelia Ritchie Austin (1821–1864)
- Profession: Attorney

James Trecothick Austin (January 7, 1784 – May 8, 1870) was the 22nd Massachusetts Attorney General. Austin was the son of Massachusetts Secretary of the Commonwealth, and Treasurer and Receiver-General of Massachusetts Jonathan L. Austin. He was elected a Fellow of the American Academy of Arts and Sciences in 1824. He graduated from Harvard College in 1802.

In 1837, he spoke at Faneuil Hall in praise of anti-abolitionists who had killed Elijah P. Lovejoy. He compared the mob to American patriots rising against the British and declared that Lovejoy "died as the fool dieth!" (Note: The phrase is a reference to 2 Samuel 3:33, "And the king lamented over Abner, and said, 'Died Abner as a fool dieth?'")

== Personal life and family ==
Austin was born on January 7, 1784, in Boston, Massachusetts.

Austin married Catharine Gerry, the eldest daughter of Elbridge Gerry. They had a son, Ivers James Austin, born February 14, 1808, and a daughter, Marie Cornelia Ritchie Austin, born on March 8, 1821.

== Death ==
Austin died on May 8, 1870, in Boston, Massachusetts. He was 86.

== Bibliography ==
- The Life of Elbridge Gerry, with Contemporary Letters to the Close of the American Revolution. 2 Volumes, (1827–1829).

Legal offices
| Preceded by Perez Morton | 22nd Attorney General of Massachusetts; 1832–1843 | Succeeded by John H. Clifford |
