= John Avery Jr. =

American politician (1739–1806)

1st Massachusetts Secretary of the Commonwealth
- In office January 1, 1780 – June 7, 1806
- Preceded by: Samuel Adams (as Secretary of the Province of Massachusetts Bay)
- Succeeded by: Jonathan L. Austin

Deputy Secretary of the Province of Massachusetts Bay
- In office June 21, 1776 – January 1, 1780
- Preceded by: John Lowell
- Succeeded by: None

Personal details
- Born: September 2, 1739
- Died: June 7, 1806 (aged 66) Boston, Massachusetts
- Spouse: Mary Cushing
- Children: Mary, Sarah, Deborah, John, Betsey, Lucy, Peggy Cushing, Lucy, Mary A. Smith, Thomas Hancock
- Education: Harvard College, 1759

John Avery Jr. (September 2, 1739 – June 7, 1806) was an American politician who served as the first Massachusetts Secretary of the Commonwealth.

== Family ==
Avery was a direct descendant of Dr. William Avery from Barkham, Berkshire, England, who emigrated to Dedham, Massachusetts, in 1650.

== Early life ==
Avery was born to John and Mary (Deming) Avery on September 2, 1739.

== Family life ==
Avery married Mary (Polly) Cushing in April 1769; they had ten children.

== Sons of Liberty ==
Avery was a member of the Sons of Liberty.

== Massachusetts Secretary ==
Avery had served as Deputy Secretary of the Province of Massachusetts Bay under Samuel Adams. Avery defeated Adams at the polls to be the first Massachusetts Secretary of the Commonwealth.

== Death ==
Avery died on June 7, 1806.

== Notes ==
Political offices
Preceded by Samuel Adams	1st Massachusetts Secretary of the Commonwealth; January 1, 1780 – June 7, 1806	Succeeded by Jonathan L. Austin
