= Massachusetts's at-large congressional seat =

Elected position

Massachusetts's at-large congressional district
- Obsolete district
- Created: 1793
- Eliminated: 1795
- Years active: 1793–1795

Massachusetts's at-large congressional seat is an obsolete construct only used during the 1792–1793 United States House of Representatives elections in Massachusetts. In that election, one of the state's then-14 representatives to the U.S. House was elected statewide at-large. At that time, the U.S. state of Massachusetts included the District of Maine.

Elected at-large was David Cobb, who served in the 3rd United States Congress (March 1793–March 1795). Other than Cobb, Massachusetts has never elected a member of the U.S. House at-large.

== Sole member ==
Member	Party	Years	Congress	Electoral history
David Cobb (Taunton)	Pro-Administration	March 4, 1793 – March 3, 1795	3rd	Elected in 1792. Redistricted to the 7th district but lost re-election.
