= John Gerard Coster =

Dutch-American Merchant

John Gerard Coster (August 1762 – August 8, 1844) was a Dutch-American merchant who served as president of the Bank of the Manhattan Company.

== Early life ==
Coster was born in August 1762 in Haarlem, Holland. He was a son of John Henry Coster (d. 1776) and Anna Catherine (née Vienecke).

He was educated to be a medical doctor under the tutelage of his brother Haro who was a well-known medical doctor in the British Navy.

== Career ==
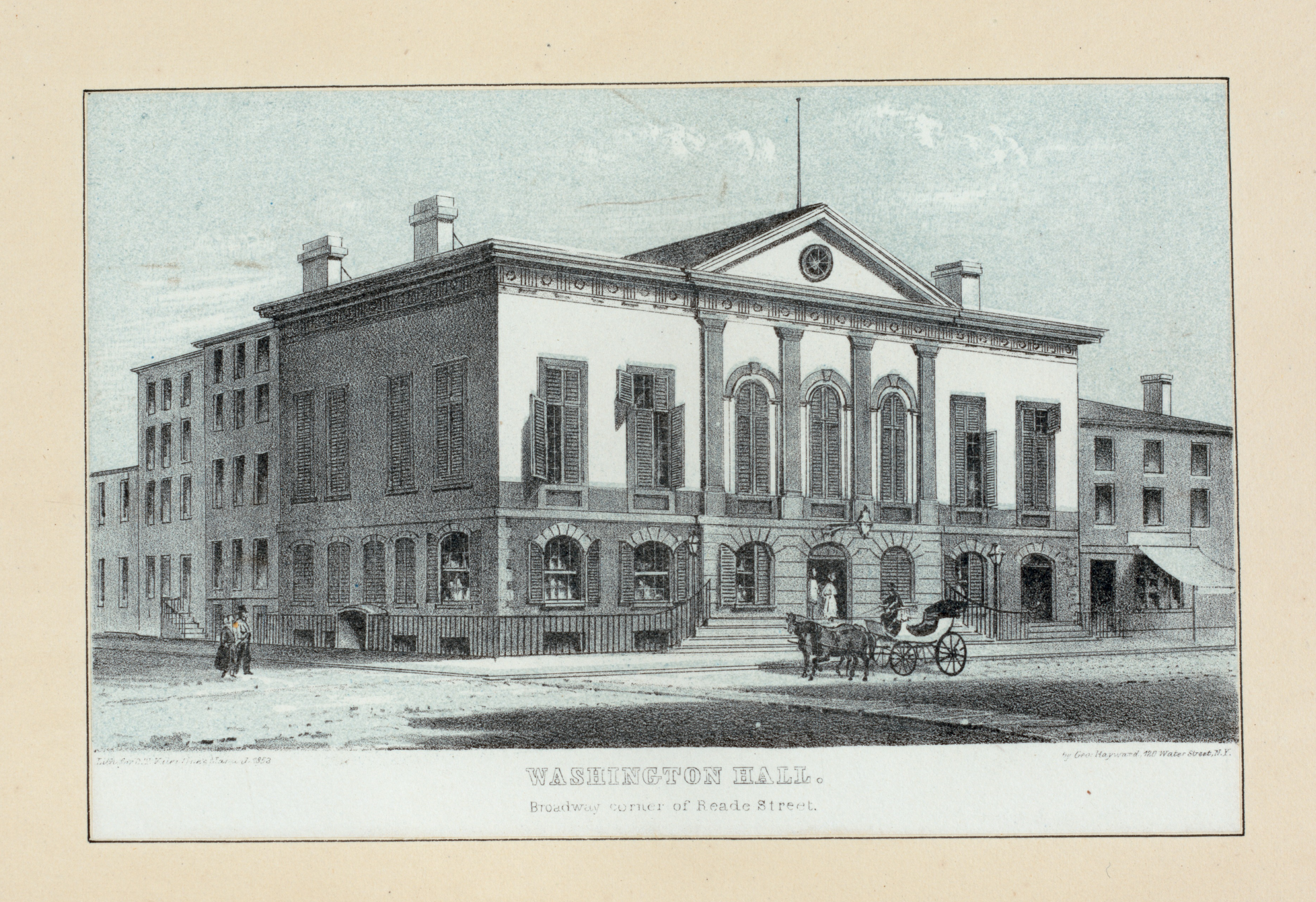
Washington Hall 1809-1844

After briefly living in Demerara in South America, Coster came to the United States from Haarlem in the Netherlands shortly after the Revolutionary War and founded the family fortune with his brother through the mercantile firm, "Henry A. & John G. Coster". They became owners of numerous vessels and traded with the East and West Indies, and exported American commodities to Europe.

In 1809, Coster financed the building of Washington Hall, a hotel, banquet hall, and restaurant that served as an early meeting place and headquarters for the Washington Benevolent Society, a semi-secret association that was an electoral arm of the Federalist Party.

In 1813, he was made a director of Bank of the Manhattan Company, which had been founded by Aaron Burr in 1799. In 1825, Coster was made president of the Manhattan Company, succeeding Henry Remsen upon his death. Coster was also a director of the Phoenix Insurance Company for many years.

== Personal life ==
Coster was married to Catherine Margaret Holsman (c. 1778–1847). Together, they lived in a house which he built at 539 Broadway, north of Canal Street, which was considered "one of the finest residences in New York." It was built by two of the most well-known architects of the day, Alexander Jackson David and Ithiel Town. They were the parents of twelve children, many of whom married into many prominent families including the Schermerhorns and Heckshers.

- John Henry Coster, who married Adeline Boardman.
- Maria Margaret Coster (1798–1835), who married Edwin Upshur Berryman. Maria died the night of the great fire in NYC. Her husband died a few years later. Their orphaned daughters lived with Henry Coster and the boys moved to KY.
- Daniel Joachim Coster (b.1804), who married Julia DeLancey (1806–1890), a daughter of Oliver DeLancey and great-granddaughter of Stephen Delancey.
- Gerard Holsman Coster (b. 1808), who married Matilda Prime, a daughter of banker Nathaniel Prime.
- Henrietta Taletta Coster
- Georgiana Louisa Coster (1815–1890), who married Charles August Heckscher, younger brother of Johann Gustav Heckscher.
- Julia Christiana Coster (b. 1816), who married Jérôme Napoléon Frédéric Reubell (1809–1874), a son of Gen. Jean-Jacques Reubell and grandson of Louis Pascault, Marquis de Poleon, in 1840.
- George Washington Coster, who married Elizabeth Oakey, a daughter of merchant Daniel Oakey.
- Henry Arnold Coster (b. 1820)
- Charles Robert Coster
- Alfred Jacob Coster
- Rutgers Eugene Coster

J G Coster died on August 8, 1844.

=== Descendants ===
Through his son Daniel, he was a grandfather of Harry Coster, an American clubman who was prominent in New York Society during the Gilded Age.

Through his daughter Julia, he was a grandfather of Henrietta Reubell (c. 1849–1924), who was a prominent figure in Paris society known for hosting a lively salon at her apartment at 42 avenue Gabriel, including James McNeill Whistler, Oscar Wilde, Edith Wharton, and Henry James.
