= William Foster Apthorp =

United States musician, writer and editor (1848–1913)

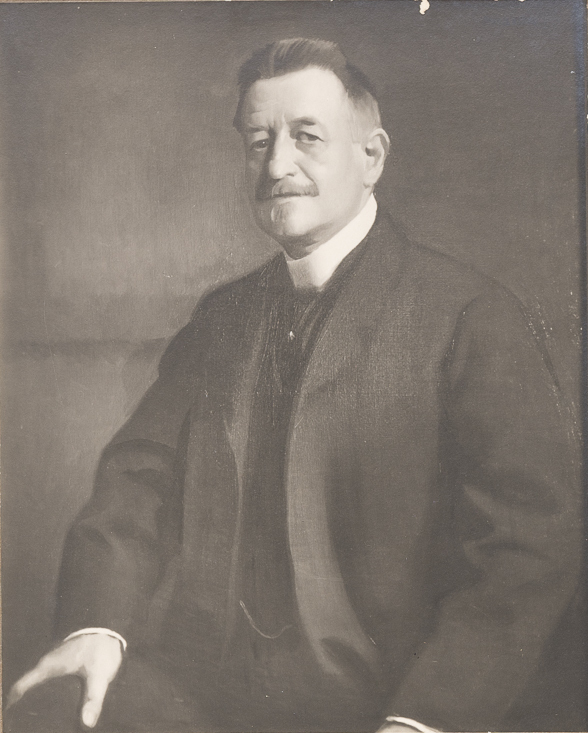
- Born: 24 October 1848; Boston
- Died: 19 February 1913 (aged 64)
- Occupation: Writer

William Foster Apthorp (October 24, 1848 in Boston – February 19, 1913 in Vevey, Switzerland) was an American writer, drama and music critic, editor and musician.

== Biography ==
He was born in 1848. He was the "son of Robert East Apthorp and Eliza Hunt, grandson of John T. Apthorp and direct descendant of Charles Apthorp, named after his maternal great grandfather William Foster. Since before the American Revolution, Apthorp's ancestors had participated in the mercantile and intellectual life of Boston." (Saloman, Am. Nat. Biog., Vol. 13, p. 567) He graduated from Harvard in 1869 having taken musical classes with J. K. Paine. He then took piano from B. J. Lang for 7 or 8 years longer. "Coming from an old Boston family whose efforts in the cause of art have always been most intimately linked with its progress in the city, he has won a career not less worthy than any of his line." (Elson, Supplement, p. 3)

In 1856, his parents took him to study languages and art in France, Dresden (Marquardt'sche Schule), Berlin (Friedrich Wilhelm'sches Progymnasium), Rome (École des Frères Chrétiens), and Florence (with classmate John Singer Sargent). He developed into an accomplished linguist who could speak “all the leading languages of Europe.” He returned to Boston in 1860. In 1869, he graduated from Harvard College, where he studied piano, harmony, and counterpoint with the institution’s first professor of music, the composer John Knowles Paine. When Paine left for Europe in 1867, he took up the study of piano with B. J. Lang. He studied music theory on his own.

In 1872, he began his career as a critic writing for the Atlantic Monthly, Dwight's Journal of Music, the Boston Courier, and the Boston Evening Traveller, and went on to help shape Boston’s musical tastes for 20 years as drama and music critic for one of Boston’s premier urban newspapers, the Boston Evening Transcript. From 1892 to 1901, he was program essayist for the Boston Symphony Orchestra. Apthorp also served at various times on the faculties of the National College of Music in Boston (harmony), the New England Conservatory of Music (piano, harmony, counterpoint, and theory), and the College of Music of Boston University (aesthetics and music history). He lectured at the Lowell Institute, Boston, and the Peabody Institute, Baltimore.

He married Octavie Loir Iasigi in 1876. In 1903, failing eyesight prompted his retirement to Vevey, Switzerland.

== Books ==
His books include:

- Hector Berlioz: Selections from His Letters and Writings, with a biographical sketch (1879) A pioneer work in English on Berlioz.
- Aesthetic, Humorous, and Satirical Writings (1879)
- Some of the Wagner Heroes and Heroines (1889)
- Musicians and Music Lovers, and Other Essays (1894)
- By the Way (1898)
- The Opera, Past and Present: An Historical Sketch (1901)
- A translation of several of Émile Zola’s stories (1895)

He also published editions of the songs of Robert Franz and Adolf Jensen, and co-edited, with John D. Champlin, Scribner’s Cyclopedia of Music and Musicians (1888–1890).
