= White Horse Tavern (Boston, Massachusetts) =

Former tavern in Boston, Massachusetts, United States

Coordinates: 42.352°N 71.063°W

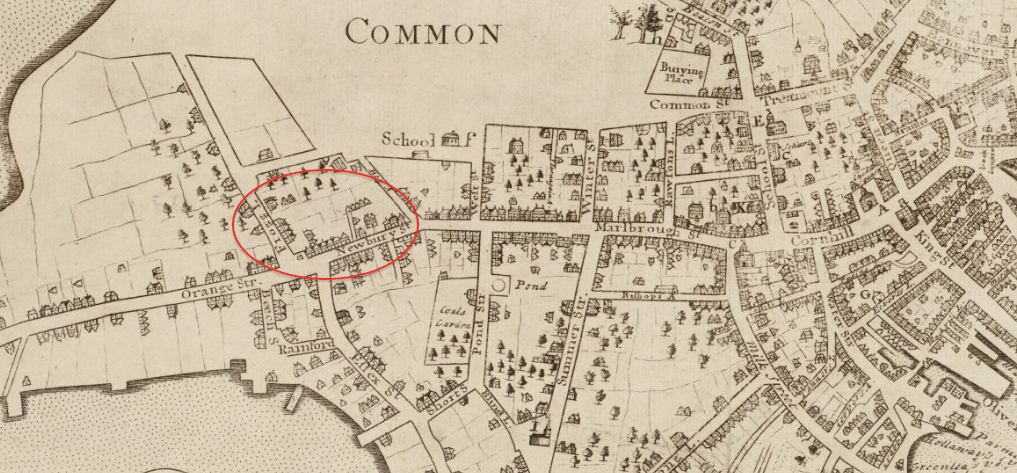
Detail of 1723 map of Boston. The White Horse Tavern stood on Newbury (later Washington Street), near Frog Lane (later Boylston Street).

The White Horse was a tavern in Boston, Massachusetts, in the 17th and 18th centuries. A well-known gathering place in colonial Boston, it "had a large square sign projecting over the footway, on which was delineated a white charger." Located near Boylston Street, the White Horse was frequently mentioned as a wayfinder to other establishments nearby.

A number of taverns were clustered on old Newbury Street in the 18th century: Lamb Tavern, Liberty Tavern, and Red Lion.

Prior to 1700, the White Horse was owned by the William Colburn (a.k.a. William Colburne) family. Under the ownership of Thomas Brattle (1700-ca.1740), the tavern was managed by Thomas Chamberlain (licensed in 1717), and William Cleeres (licensed in 1718). After Brattle, the tavern was owned by Jonathan Dwight (1740-ca.1765?). Managers included Mrs. Moulton (licensed in 1764). The next owner was Joseph Morton (1765–1791). In May, 1787, Israel Hatch of Attleboro took over as manager of the tavern. Subsequent owners included Joseph Morton's son, Perez Morton (1791–1799); and Aaron Emmes (1799).

The White Horse is featured in a scene in the novel The Rebels: Or, Boston Before the Revolution by Lydia Maria Child (1850).
