= John Coffin Jones Jr. =

American diplomat (1796–1861)

U.S. Agent for Commerce and Seamen to the Kingdom of Hawaii
- In office September 19, 1820 – April 1839
- Preceded by: Inaugural holder
- Succeeded by: Peter A. Brinsmade

Personal details
- Born: John Coffin Jones Jr. 1796 Boston, Massachusetts, U.S.
- Died: December 24, 1861 (aged 64–65) Newton, Massachusetts, U.S.
- Spouses: Hannah Holmes Davis (m. 1823; div. 1838) Manuela Carrillo (m. 1838)
- Relations: Christopher Champlin (uncle)
- Parent(s): John Coffin Jones Sr. Elizabeth Champlin Jones

John Coffin Jones Jr. (1796 – December 24, 1861) was the first United States Consular Agent to the Kingdom of Hawaii.

== Early life ==
John Coffin Jones Jr. was born in 1796 in Boston, Massachusetts, and baptized on June 26, 1796, by the minister of the Brattle Street Church. He was the son of John Coffin Jones Sr. (1750–1829) and his third wife, Elizabeth (née Champlin) Jones (1770–1837). His father served as the Speaker of the Massachusetts House of Representatives. His siblings included Christopher Champlin Jones and Anna Powel Jones and his elder half-siblings included Thomas Jones and Margaret Champlin Jones (Note: Margaret Champlin Jones (1792–1848) was married to Benjamin Underhill Coles in 1817. After Coles' death, she married Benjamin Gorham in 1829.) and Mary Jones.

Through his mother, he was the nephew of U.S. Senator from Rhode Island Christopher G. Champlin and grandson of Christopher Champlin, a merchant, ship owner and financier of Newport, Rhode Island.

== Career ==
Jones worked for Marshall and Wildes of Boston before he was appointed as the first Consul to Hawaii, which was then known as the Sandwich Islands, on September 19, 1820. He was considered an advocate for commercial interests in Hawaii, and was often in conflict with missionary elements in the island. He was a Unitarian. His career was full of turmoil and complaint, and had limited support or instruction from Washington, D.C. Although "his disposition was so unsteady and irascible", he was known for his entertainment of visiting dignitaries, including John Sutter.

In 1838, Jones returned to Hawaii after a business trip in California and introduced Manuela Carrillo as his wife. Still married to Hannah, she initiated a divorce, after which King Kamehameha III refused to acknowledge him as the Consul from the United States.

In 1843, Manuela's father, Governor Carlos Antonio Carrillo, and her uncle, José Antonio Carrillo, were granted Santa Rosa Island by Governor Manuel Micheltorena. The brothers then sold the island to Manuela and her sister Francisca, who was also married to an American, Alpheus Basil Thompson.

The Jones and the Thompsons then established a cattle ranch on Santa Rosa Island. In 1846, after the United States invaded Mexico during the Mexican–American War and occupied California, John and his wife moved to his native Boston. Jones later learned that Thompson had sold many of the island's livestock and didn't share the proceeds with him so he sued Thompson in 1851. Jones won the suit and Thompson appealed claiming John had "bought" witnesses. In 1857, Jones won the appeal and Abel Stearns was appointed as receiver to set the value of the property in dispute. Two years later in 1859, both Jones and Thompson sold their remaining interests in Santa Rosa Island to brother Thomas, Alexander, and Henry More.

== Personal life ==
In 1823, Jones was married to Hannah Kalikolehua (née Holmes) Davis (d. 1848), the widow of Captain William Heath Davis. Hannah was the mother of two children from her first marriage, Robert Grimes Davis and William Heath Davis. Together, Hannah and John were the parents of:

- Elizabeth Jones (1830–1852), who married Captain John H. Brown (1820–1892) in 1848.

While in Hawaii and still married to Davis, Jones fathered three children with Lahilahi Marín (d. 1844), a daughter of Don Francisco de Paula Marín, the Spanish born confidant of Hawaiian King Kamehameha I. Their children were:

- Francis Jones (1830–1850)
- Rosalie Coffin Jones (1835–1863)
- John "Huanu" Coffin Jones III (1842–1919)

While in Santa Barbara, California on business, he met and married Manuela Antonia Carrillo (1820–1900) on June 4, 1838. She was the daughter of Governor Carlos Antonio Carrillo and Josefa Raymunda Castro. Together, they were the parents of:

- Margarita Antonia Jones (1840–1904), who married Robert F. Clark (b. 1838).
- John Coffin Jones, Jr. (1842–1919), who served in the U.S. Civil War, became a stockbroker, and married Ella Maria Sumner in 1866.
- Benjamín Geronimo Jones (1844–1845), who died young.
- Anna Powell Jones (b. 1846).
- Joseph Cutler Jones (b. 1849).
- Charles Carrillo Jones (1850–1869).
- Martha Josepha Jones (b. 1855).

Jones died on December 24, 1861, in Newton, Massachusetts. After his death, Manuela married George Nelson Kittle in 1867 and, later, moved to France where she died at Nice in 1900.

== See also ==
- United States Minister to Hawaii
- Relations between the Kingdom of Hawaii and the United States
