= John Coffin Jones Sr. =

American politician

Speaker of the Massachusetts House of Representatives

Member of the Massachusetts House of Representatives

Member of the Massachusetts House of Representatives
- In office 1802–1803
- Preceded by: Edward Robbins
- Succeeded by: Harrison Gray Otis

Personal details
- Born: 1749
- Died: October 25, 1829 (aged 79–80) Boston, Massachusetts, US
- Party: Federalist
- Children: John Coffin Jones Jr.
- Education: Harvard College

John Coffin Jones Sr. (1749 – October 25, 1829) was a businessman who served as the Speaker of the Massachusetts House of Representatives from 1802 to 1803.

== Early life ==
Jones was born in 1749. He was the son of Ichabod Jones. John attended and graduated from Harvard College.

== Career ==
In 1790, Jones wrote to Thomas Jefferson upon his return from France as the U.S. Minister regarding "whalefishery," which Jones considered it to "ever been the most important branch of business to this State, by furnishing its most valuable Staple export, creating a great consumption of the Produce of the Country; and thereby giving employment to a vast number of husbandmen and mechanics, whilst it proved a most extensive nursery of expert and hardy seamen." Jones was a businessman who became a member of the Massachusetts House of Representatives. From 1802 to 1803, he served as the Speaker of the House succeeding Edward Robbins. Jones was succeeded by Harrison Gray Otis, who later served as the Mayor of Boston and a U.S. Senator from Massachusetts.

In 1814, Jones was elected a member of the American Antiquarian Society.

== Personal life ==
Jones was married three times. Among his wives were Mary Lee. Together, they were the parents of:

- Thomas Jones.

His second wife was Abigail C. Jones, and Jones' third wife was Elizabeth (née Champlin) (1770–1837) the sister of U.S. Senator from Rhode Island Christopher G. Champlin [Harvard 1786] and grandson of Christopher Champlin, a merchant, ship owner and financier of Newport, Rhode Island. Together, they were the parents of:

- Margaret Champlin Jones (1792–1848), who married Benjamin Underhill Coles in 1817. After his death, she married Hon. Benjamin Gorham in 1829.
- Martha Ellery Jones (b. 1794), who married Isaac Underill Coles, the brother of her elder sister's first husband, Benjamin Underhill Coles, in 1823.
- Mary Jones (1795–1837), who died unmarried.
- John Coffin Jones Jr. (1796–1861), who was the first United States Consular Agent to the Kingdom of Hawaii.
- Christopher Champlin Jones (b. 1798)
- Anna Powel Jones (b. 1803)

Jones died on October 25, 1829, in Boston, Massachusetts, and was buried at King's Chapel Burying Ground in Boston.

=== Descendants ===
Through his daughter Martha, he was the grandfather of Mary Lee Coles, who married Harry Coster, who were both prominent in New York society during the Gilded Age.

Political offices
Preceded by Edward Robbins	Speaker of the Massachusetts House of Representatives; 1802 — 1803	Succeeded by Harrison Gray Otis
