= Jonathan Patten =

American politician

Member of the Massachusetts House of Representatives
- In office May 1802 – 1803

Personal details
- Born: 1744 Cambridge, Massachusetts Bay Colony
- Died: December 29, 1809 (aged 64–65) Stockbridge, Massachusetts, USA
- Resting place: Stockbridge Cemetery
- Spouse: Electa Brown (m. 1799)
- Children: 4

Military service
- Years of service: c. 1781

Jonathan Patten (1744 – December 29, 1809) was an American merchant and politician who served in the Massachusetts House of Representatives. A veteran of the American Revolutionary War, he represented Stockbridge, Massachusetts, in the state legislature from 1802 to 1803.

== Early life ==
Patten was born circa 1744 to Nathaniel and Mary Patten. While little is documented regarding his early education, he established himself as a merchant in Boston, Massachusetts by the late 18th century.

== Military Service ==
During the American Revolutionary War, Patten enlisted in the military in 1781. He served as a lieutenant colonel under the command of Colonel William Turner. His contributions during the war earned him the rank of Colonel, a title he used throughout his subsequent political career.

== Career ==
Col. Patten was active in the civic affairs of Stockbridge. In May 1802, he was elected to represent the town in the Massachusetts House of Representatives, serving until 1803. In 1804, the Massachusetts Senate appointed him to a committee tasked with evaluating the construction of a turnpike road extending from Canaan, Connecticut to Tyringham, Massachusetts

== Personal life ==
On December 24, 1799, Patten married Electa Brown (1769–1845) in a ceremony officiated by the Rev. Stephen West in Stockbridge. Electa was the daughter of Captain Elijah Brown, a prominent local figure who had served as a representative to the Massachusetts Provincial Congress in 1776. The couple had at least four children.

Patten died on December 29, 1809, at the age of 65, and was buried at Stockbridge Cemetery in Stockbridge, Massachusetts.
