= John T. Apthorp =

- Born: December 24, 1769
- Died: April 8, 1849 (aged 79)
- Occupation: Banker
- Spouse(s): Grace Foster; Mary Spear Foster
- Relatives: William Foster Apthorp (grandson)

John Trecothick Apthorp (December 24, 1769 – April 8, 1849) was a banker, Lieutenant Colonel of the First Corps of Cadets (Massachusetts) and grandson of Charles Apthorp.

He became President of the Suffolk Insurance Company and Bank Boston, before becoming the Treasurer and Receiver-General of Massachusetts 1812–1817.

== Early life ==
He was born on December 24, 1769, to John Apthorp of Boston and London and his second wife, Hannah Greenleaf, who perished at sea while sailing to Charleston, South Carolina. He and his two sisters, Frances Western and Hannah were raised by their maternal grandfather Stephen Greenleaf, the last Royal high sheriff of Suffolk County. He graduated from Harvard University in 1792 and Harvard Law School in 1796. He also had two half-sisters from his father's first marriage to Alicia Mann.

== Personal life ==
He first married Grace Foster, the daughter of William Foster and Grace Spear. She died leaving one child. Next, he married her twin sister Mary Spear. They had nine children. His sister Frances Western married Charles Vaughn, son of Samuel Vaughan. His sister Hannah married Charles Bulfinch. His sister in-law Sally Foster married Harrison Gray Otis. William Foster Apthorp is his grandson, his nephews were Thomas Bulfinch and Stephen Greenleaf Bulfinch.

== Works most widely held in WorldCat libraries ==
=== Letter, 1815 Feb 11, to John T. Apthorp ===
One edition was published in 1815 in English and held by one library. George Cabot, chairman of a committee appointed to respond to Apthorp, treasurer of the Commonwealth of Massachusetts wrote in connection to a business transaction between the Commonwealth and the bank. Letter transmits five documents to Apthorp that the committee deemed necessary for him to examine.

=== Documents ===
Numerous indenture documents have survived, including 1791–1822, between Francis Bertody and Charles Bulfinch, Charles Bulfinch and Lucy Watson, and Charles Bulfinch and Benjamin M. Watson ( misc )

- Conveyance of property on Cambridge Street, Boston from Bertody to Bulfinch, 1791 May 5.
- Conveyance of same property from Bulfinch to Lucy Watson, 1807 Dec. 29
- (on verso) conveyance from Lucy Watson to Benjamin Marston Watson, 1812 July 3.
- Agreement of payment that Bulfinch stands bound and obliged unto Lucy Watson for the sum of four thousand dollars to be paid on or before 1808 Dec. 29 (dated 1807 Dec. 29).
- Letter, 1822 Nov. 5 by Bulfinch, Washington, D.C. to Benj. M. Watson discharging "the mortgage formerly given by me, upon the house and land in Cambridge Street--to Jno. Apthorp, B. Joy, I.P. Davis and George Storer."

=== Papers, 1817-1841 ===
Most items relate to his duties as collector, U.S. Customs House, Boston.

Political offices
Preceded by Jonathan L. Austin	Treasurer and Receiver-General of Massachusetts; 1812–1817	Succeeded by Daniel Sargent
