= Jonathan L. Austin =

American politician (1748–1826)

Jonathan Loring Austin

2nd Massachusetts Secretary of the Commonwealth
- In office 1806–1808
- Governor: Caleb Strong
- Preceded by: John Avery Jr.
- Succeeded by: William Tudor

10th Treasurer and Receiver-General of Massachusetts
- In office 1811–1812
- Preceded by: Thomas Harris
- Succeeded by: John T. Apthorp

Member of the Massachusetts Senate

Personal details
- Born: January 2, 1748 Boston, Massachusetts, U.S.
- Died: May 10, 1826 (aged 78) Boston, Massachusetts, U.S.
- Party: Democratic-Republican Party
- Spouse: Hannah Ivers (m. 1782)
- Children: James T. Austin
- Education: Harvard College; 1766

Military service
- Allegiance: United States of America
- Branch/service: Continental Army
- Rank: Major
- Battles/wars: American Revolution

Jonathan Loring Austin (January 2, 1748 – May 10, 1826) was an American revolutionary, diplomat and politician who served as the second Massachusetts Secretary of the Commonwealth and the tenth Treasurer and Receiver-General of Massachusetts. He was the father of Massachusetts Attorney General James T. Austin.

== Personal life ==
Austin was born on January 2, 1748, in Boston, Massachusetts. He graduated from Harvard College in 1766. After he graduated, Austin moved to Portsmouth, New Hampshire, and became a merchant there.

Austin married Hannah Ivers (1756−1818), the daughter of James and Hannah (Trecothick) Ivers, in Boston on April 4, 1782. He was the father of James T. Austin.

== Career ==
=== American Revolutionary War ===
When the war started Austin became a Major in Langdon's Regiment, and later an aid to General John Sullivan.

=== Massachusetts Board of War ===
Austin was the secretary to the Massachusetts Board of War until October 1777, when he was sent to Paris by Massachusetts to announce to Benjamin Franklin and his associates the news of John Burgoyne's surrender at the Battle of Saratoga.

==== Diplomatic mission ====
Franklin soon afterwards sent him on a secret mission to England, where he met many members of the opposition and furnished them with much information concerning American affairs. The trip was full of incident, and, says one of Franklin's biographers (Morse), "brings to mind some of the Jacobite tales of Sir Walter Scott's novels." He carried dispatches to Congress from the United States Commissioners in Paris early in 1779, and in January 1780, was dispatched to Europe to secure loans for Massachusetts in Spain and Holland.

That same month, Austin was captured by the British while on this mission. He was later released. He failed to secure the loan, and he returned in the autumn of 1781.

=== Later career ===
Austin served as Massachusetts Secretary of the Commonwealth for two years, from 1806 to 1808.

Austin served as Treasurer and Receiver-General of Massachusetts from 1811 to 1812.

== Death ==
Austin died on May 10, 1826, in Boston, Massachusetts. He was 78.

== Footnotes ==
Political offices
Preceded by John Avery, Jr.	2nd Massachusetts Secretary of the Commonwealth; 1806–1808	Succeeded by William Tudor
Preceded by Thomas Harris	10th Treasurer and Receiver-General of Massachusetts; 1811–1812	Succeeded by John T. Apthorp
