= Charles Apthorp =

English-born merchant and slave trader

- Portrait by Robert Feke, c. 1748
- Born: before 28 March 1697; London, Middlesex, England
- Died: 11 November 1758 (aged 61); Boston, Massachusetts
- Spouse: Grizzel Eastwicke
- Children: 18
- Parent(s): East Apthorp; Susan Ward

Coat of Arms of Charles Apthorp

Charles Apthorp (March 1697 – 11 November 1758) was an English-born merchant and slave trader in Boston, Massachusetts. Apthorp managed his import business from Merchants Row, and "in his day he was called the richest man in Boston." He also served in the employ of the British government for various schemes it attempted to implement in North America.

== Early life ==
Charles Apthorp was baptised on 28 March 1697 at St Botolph-without-Bishopsgate, London, England, to East Apthorp and Susan Ward.

== Career ==
Charles Apthorp immigrated with his parents to New England some time after 1698. In 1713 his father died in Boston. In the city, he served as a commissary and paymaster for the British Army and established a mercantile business. Apthorp was a successful, wealthy man, with "imperial trading connections".

=== Import merchant ===
Among the goods imported and/or sold through Apthorp on Merchants Row in Boston were "choice madera wines, ... a parcel of Russia duck and several sorts of European goods"; "British duck of all sorts"; "choice good sea coal, ... several second hand cables, little the worse for wear, and anchors suitable, with window glass of most sorts, and a parcel of lead and shot"; "a good new still and worm of about 600 gallons"; salt; "a parcel of guns, 4-pounders, with carriages and shott, also a parcel of swivel-guns with shott suitable;" a "well fitted" 50-ton sloop"; and "a brigantine about 90 tuns, and three years old, now lying at the Long Wharfe".

=== Slave trade ===
Apthorp was a "venerable slave importer and one of the richest men in Boston" by 1746. At that time, slave advertisements regularly appeared in the weekly Boston Gazette. Between 1719 and 1781, there were about 2,300 slave advertisements for about 2,000 enslaved individuals. In the 1730s and 1740s he traded in slaves, posting advertisements in Boston Gazette, with one stating that he had "a parcel of likely negros just imported".

In 1733 Apthorp acted as agent for a man seeking his enslaved servant, Hannah Smyth, who had run away with a stolen diamond "and has lately been seen here in Boston." He performed a similar role in 1742, authorized to furnish "five pounds reward" for the return of a "negro man named Jack about 35 years old" to his enslaver, Stephen Eastwick. In 1756 Apthorp & Son served as agent for someone looking for an anchor lost on Cape Cod "with two iron clasps on one of the flukes, a solid pine buoy, and buoy-rope."

=== British government representative ===
Along with Thomas Hancock, Apthorp represented the British government in its efforts to recruit personnel to Nova Scotia—ship pilots, bricklayers, carpenters, settlers, etc. He also served as "paymaster and commissary under the British Government of the land and naval forces quartered in Boston".

Apthorp and Hancock also supplied many of the ships used during the forced removal of the Acadians from Nova Scotia. The two merchants also lent money to finance the operation, and the poor quality of ships supplied by Apthorp and Hancock led to instances of malnutrition, disease and death among the Acadians on board.

== Personal life ==
=== Marriage and children ===
Apthorp married Grizzel Eastwicke on 13 January 1726. She was born in Jamaica to Griselda Lloyd and John Eastwicke. (Note: Griselda's father was Sir John Lloyd of Somersetshire, England. After the Battle of Worcester, Lloyd was one of the men who escorted King Charles II of England to France.) A descendant of the couple, great-grandson Joseph Coolidge, stated that: "Her portrait, painted by Sir Peter Lely, and showing her to have been remarkably beautiful, remains in the family." She was said to have "rare qualities of person and character."

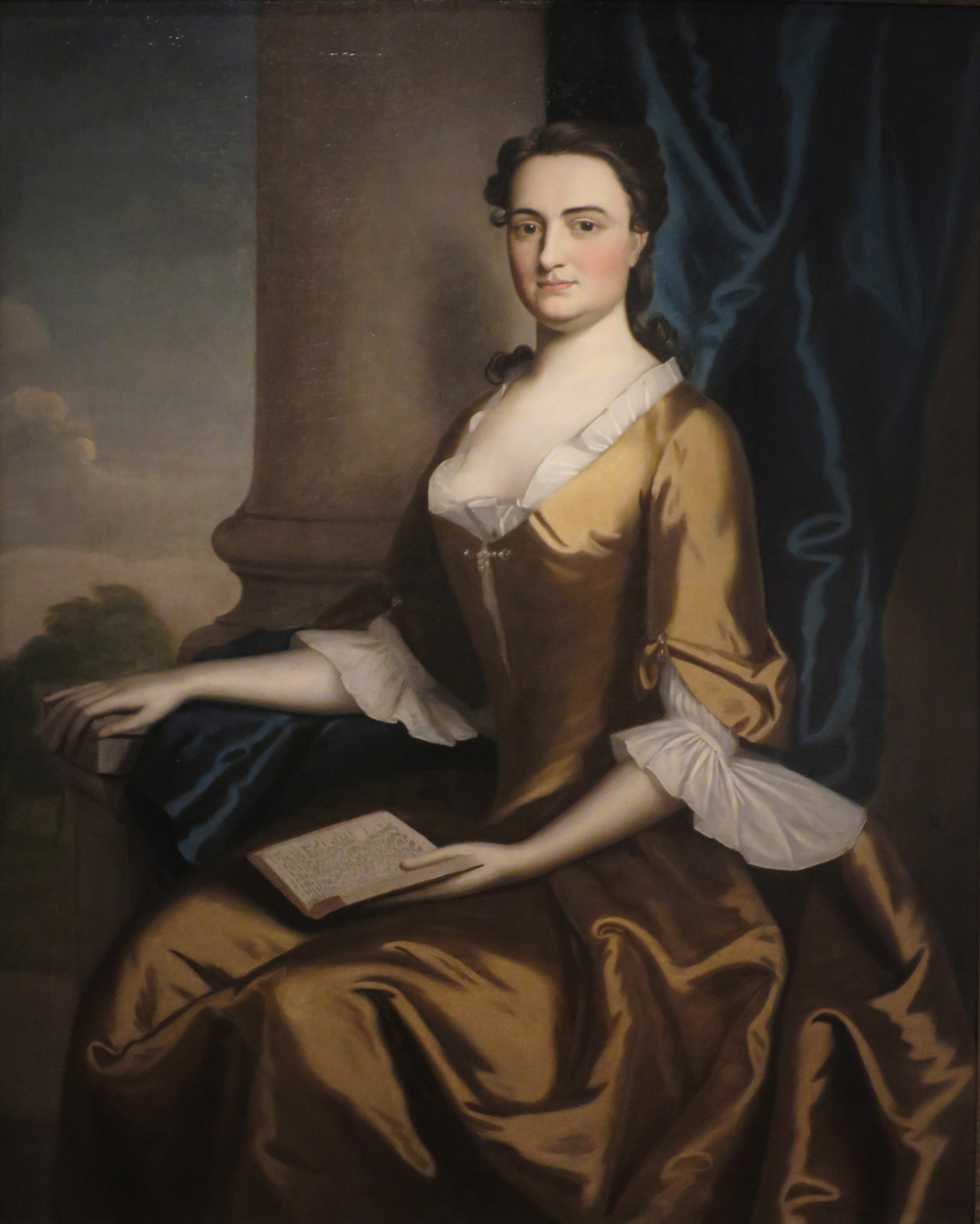
Mrs. Charles Apthorp (Grizzel Eastwick Apthorp) by Robert Feke

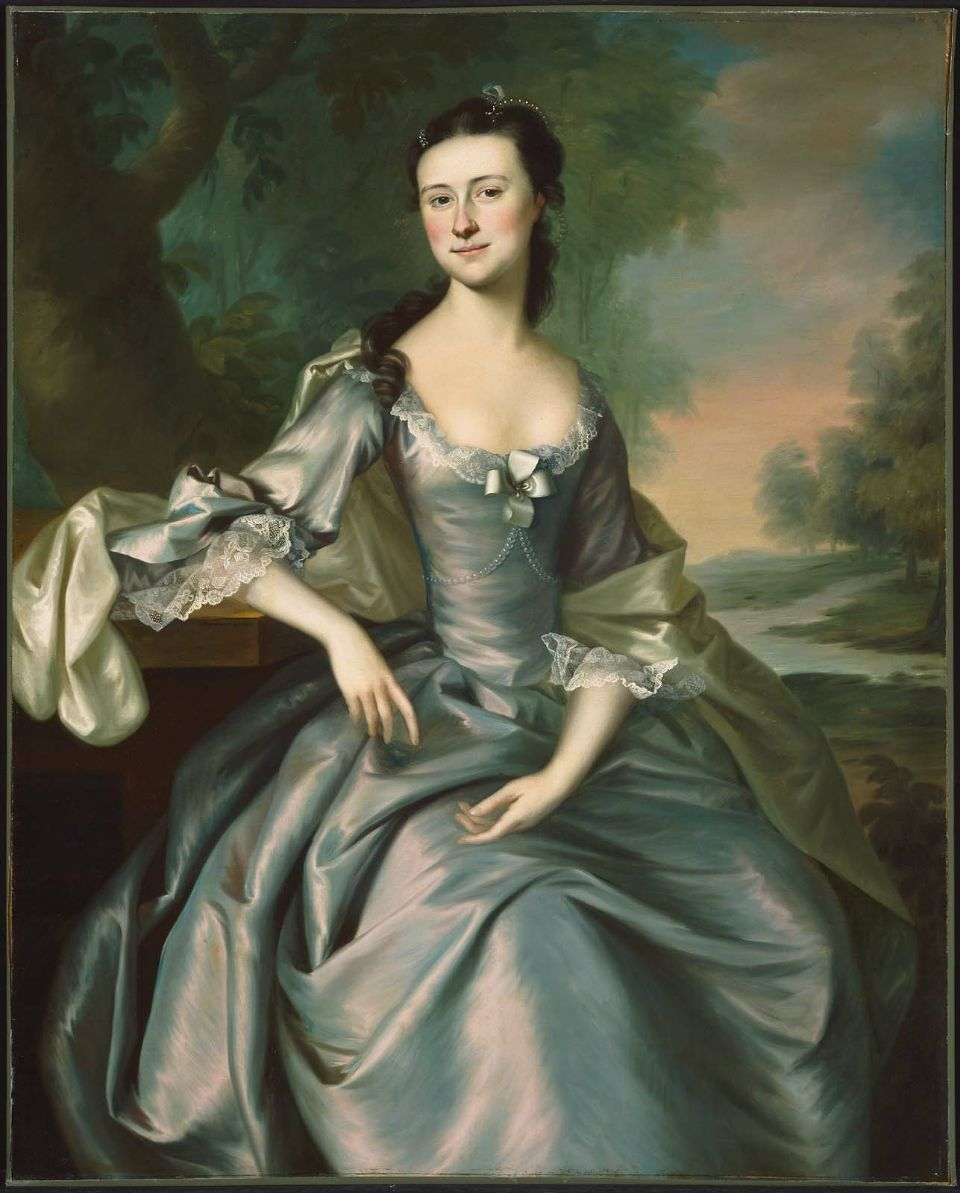
Portrait of Charles' daughter, Susan Apthorp, 1757

Apthorp and his wife had eighteen children, three of whom died before him:

- Charles Ward Apthorp (1726 – May 1797) (later of Apthorp Farm). Charles married Mary McEvers. His granddaughter was Maria Eliza Van Den Heuvel, who married John Church Hamilton. His great-granddaughter, Charlotte Augusta Gibbes, married John Jacob Astor III.
- Grizzel Apthorp Trecothick (1727 – 1769). She married Barlow Trecothick.
- John Apthorp (1730 – 1773). He married 1st Alica Mann, sister of Horace Mann, 2nd Hannah Greenleaf daughter of Stephen Greenleaf, granddaughter of Thomas Loring. He was member of the house of Thomlinson and Trecothink. On a voyage to Charleston, South Carolina, they were lost at sea. Their children survived them, Colonel John T. Apthorp, Hannah who married Charles Bulfinch, and Frances Western who married Charles Vaughn.
- James Apthorp (17 November 1731 – 1799).He married Sarah Wentworth. Her family owned Wentworth Manor in Yorkshire.
- East Apthorp (27 March 1733 – 20 April 1816), who became a minister. East Apthorp built in 1761 a mansion designed by Peter Harrison; it is now part of the Harvard University campus in Cambridge, Massachusetts.
- Susan Apthorp Bulfinch (1734 – 15 February 1814). She married Thomas Bulfinch on 8 October 1754. He was warden of the King's Chapel church after the Revolutionary War. They were the parents of architect Charles Bulfinch.
- Ann Apthorp Wheelwright (18 January 1736 – 1814). She married Nathaniel Wheelwright.
- Henry Apthorp (19 March 1737 – 1762)
- Stephen Apthorp (10 March 1738 – 1774)
- Joseph Apthorp (22 April 1739 – March 1749)
- Elizabeth Apthorp McEvers Bayard (28 May 1740 – 1800). She was married twice to men from New York: James McEvers (her eldest brother's brother-in-law), and her brother-in-law Robert Bayard, after her sister Rebecca's death.
- Thomas Apthorp (19 October 1741 – ?). After his father's death and until 1776, Thomas was made paymaster to British forces. He went to England, married in Lisbon and died in Ludlow, Wales.
- Catherine Apthorp I (1742 – 1743). Died young.
- George Apthorp (1744). Died young.
- Robert Apthorp (1745). Died young.
- Rebecca Apthorp Bayard (20 June 1746 – 1771). She married Robert Bayard from New York.
- William Henry Apthorp (26 February 1749 – 1781). He married Mary Thompson.
- Catherine Apthorp II (1750). She died on the date of her birth.

The family had a home in Boston and another outside town in Quincy, Massachusetts.

=== Religion ===
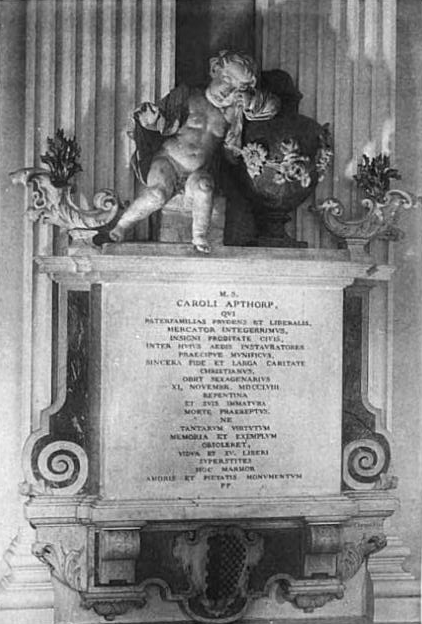
Apthorp tablet in King's Chapel, Boston

He helped to found Trinity Church, Boston and was one of the first churchwardens of that church.

He was a churchwarden at the King's Chapel in Boston, starting in 1731 when he and other churchwardens met weekly and conducted affairs for the church, including hiring, assigning pews in the church, managing finances and interacting with members about church operations. Apthorp, "of the old tenor, contributed £200 towards the cost of a new church building; If sufficient funds were not raised within the church congregation, he agreed to pay an additional £1,000. He was elected to manage treasury of the new building funds.

He was a leading, "noteworthy" member of the church who was: "Warden in 1731-1732, 1743-1744, treasurer of the Building Committee, and a generous subscriber to the new church.

His large family filled two family pews in the church.

Among the Apthorp's personal possessions were "a set of eight chairs ... probably purchased from the chairmaker and upholsterer Samuel Grant, [with] carving ... attributed to John Welch."

=== Portraits ===
Portraits were made of Charles Apthorp by Joseph Blackburn; (Note: Blackburn represented "Mr. and Mrs. Apthorp, in 1758, in the habit as they lived, -- an 'elderly gentleman, dressed in red broadcloth, with black silk stockings, sitting in his garden in Quincy, looking toward his house, and in the background a view of the old Adams mansion'." His wife was "a lady, dressed in a changeable salmon and green silk robe, cut square in the neck, the sleeves trimmed with lace.") and John Singleton Copley.

Family portraits at the Museum of Fine Arts, Boston as of 1908 include works by Robert Feke and Hartwell: (Note: The Hartwell mentioned was perhaps Alonzo Hartwell.)

- Portrait of Charles Apthorp, by Robert Feke
- Portrait of Griselda Eastwicke Apthorp, by Robert Feke
- Portrait of Mrs. Barlow Trecothick, by Robert Feke
- Portrait of Griselda Eastwicke, by Hartwell

The Fine Arts museum's collection now contains miniatures, a few portraits and silverware from the Apthorp family.

== Death ==
Apthorp died suddenly in November 1758; he complained "of a slight cold a few minutes before he expired." A New England newspaper described him as "the greatest and most noble merchant on this continent." Twelve days after his death, his funeral was held at King's Chapel. It was "attended by very many gentlemen of distinction and principal inhabitants of the town. The streets and windows of the houses, as the solemnity passed along, were thronged with spectators. ... [At King's Chapel] the Reverend Mr. Caner preached a suitable sermon to a crowded audience."

A wall monument sculpted by Henry Cheere and shipped from England, memorializes Apthorp inside King's Chapel; it "is crowned by a cherub weeping over a cinerary urn."

In a book written in 1910, Apthorp left a fortune equal to $150,000.

After her husband died Grizzel lived near the Central House on Brattle Square [Dock Square at Brattle Street]. She died at 88 years of age in 1796 in the home of her son, John in Quincy. A notice of her death described her as virtuous, amiable, charitable and well-regarded.

== Images ==
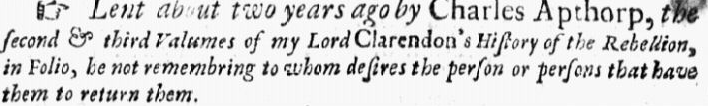
Newspaper advertisement, 1732, seeking his lost copy of Clarendon's History of the Rebellion

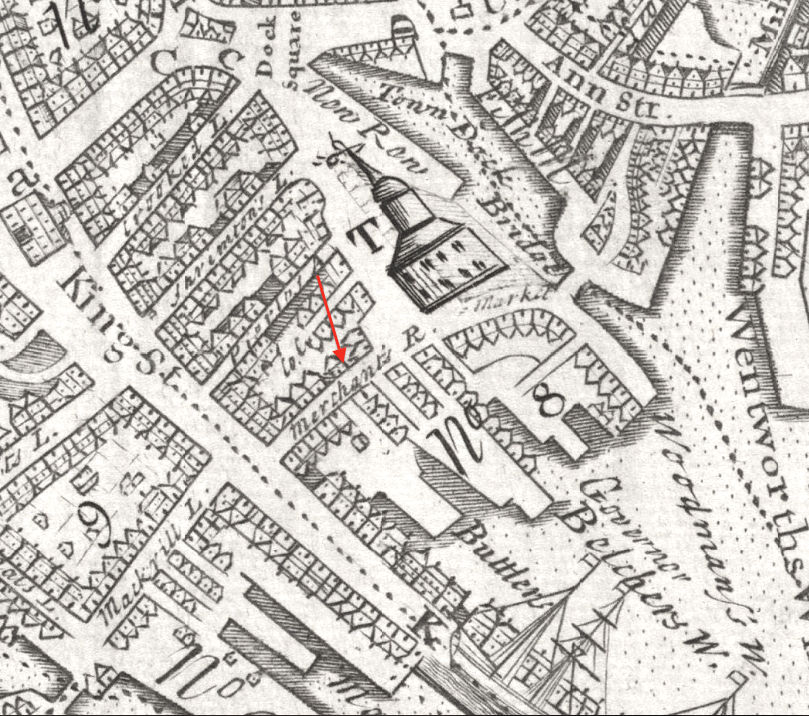
Detail of 1743 map of Boston, showing Merchants Row

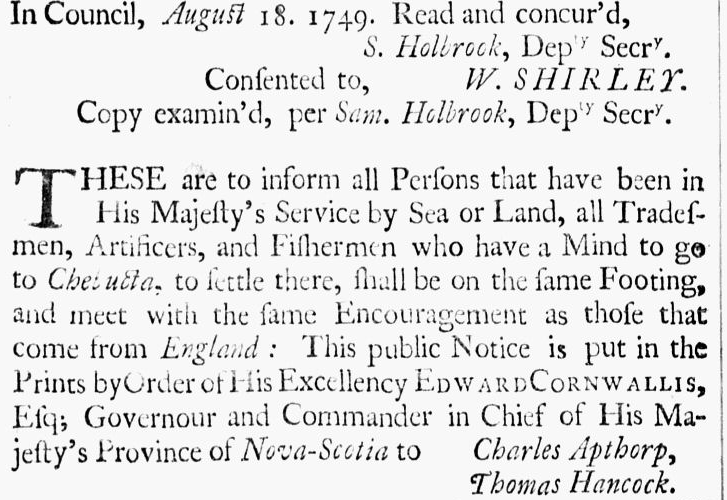
Newspaper item encouraging British settlement in Chebucta, Nova Scotia, 1749

== See also ==
- Apthorp Farm
- Calf Island (Massachusetts)
- Long Island (Massachusetts)
