= Perez Morton =

American politician

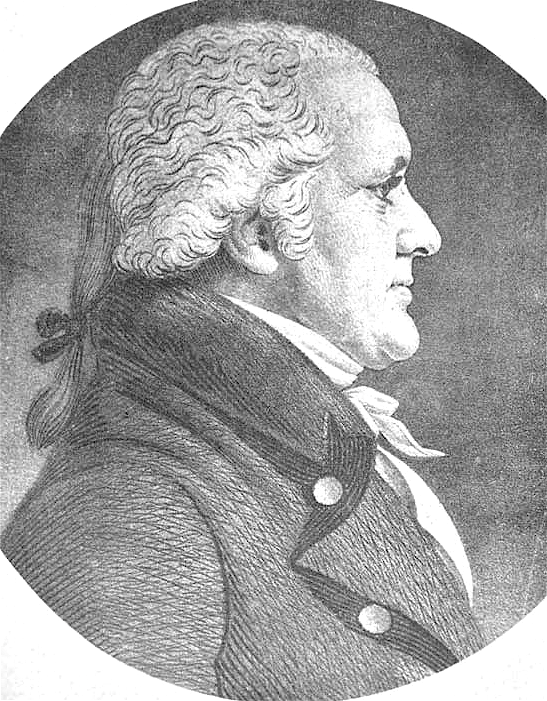
- Portrait of Morton, by Saint-Mémin

Massachusetts Attorney General
- In office 1810–1832
- Governor: Elbridge Gerry; Caleb Strong; John Brooks; William Eustis; Marcus Morton; Levi Lincoln Jr.
- Preceded by: Barnabas Bidwell
- Succeeded by: James T. Austin

Speaker of the Massachusetts House of Representatives
- In office 1810–1811
- Preceded by: Timothy Bigelow
- Succeeded by: Joseph Story

Speaker of the Massachusetts House of Representatives
- In office 1806–1808
- Preceded by: Timothy Bigelow
- Succeeded by: Timothy Bigelow

Personal details
- Born: November 13, 1751 Plymouth, Massachusetts
- Died: October 14, 1837 (aged 85) Dorchester, Massachusetts
- Spouse: Sarah Wentworth Apthorp
- Children: Sarah Apthorp Morton (1782–1844); Anna Louisa Morton (1783–1843); Frances Wentworth Morton (1785–1831); Charles Ward Apthorp Morton (1786-1809); Charlotte Morton (1787–1819)
- Education: Harvard
- Profession: Attorney

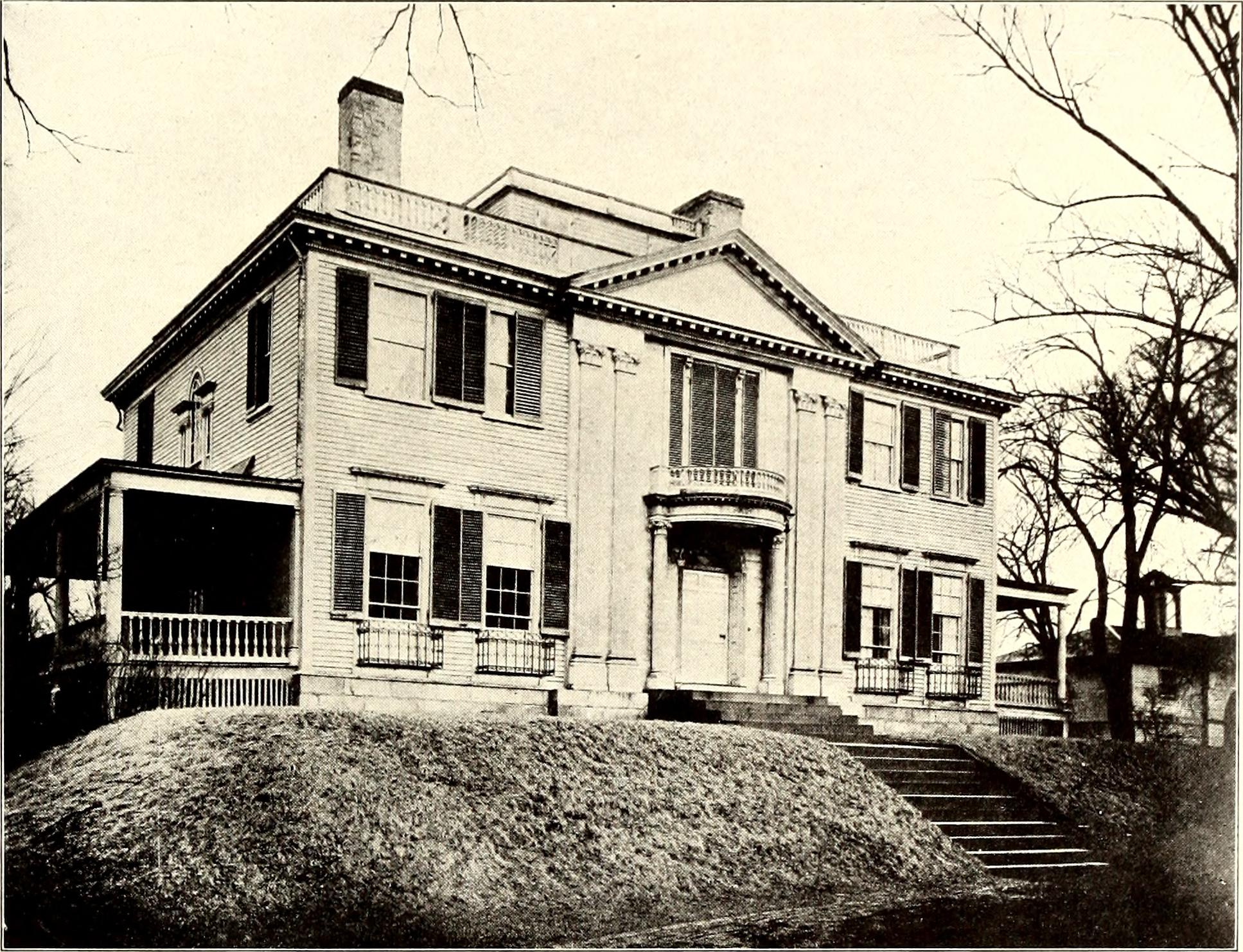
Perez Morton House in Dorchester (1796), by Charles Bulfinch

Perez Morton (November 13, 1751 – October 14, 1837) was an American lawyer, politician and revolutionary patriot in Boston, Massachusetts. He was Massachusetts Attorney General from 1810 until 1832.

== Life and career ==
Coat of Arms of Perez Morgan

Morton was born in Plymouth, Massachusetts in 1751, and raised in Boston. His father, Joseph Morton, owned the White Horse Tavern. Perez attended the Boston Latin School starting around 1760, and Harvard College, graduating in 1771. He was admitted to the Massachusetts bar in 1774.

He participated in the Committee of Safety, and the Committee of Correspondence; he was also a Mason, serving as Deputy Grand Master of the Grand Lodge of Massachusetts in 1789-1790. In 1775-1776, he was Deputy Secretary of the Council of the Colony of Massachusetts Bay. On April 8, 1776, Morton spoke at the memorial service held for Joseph Warren, at King's Chapel.

In 1778, he married Sarah Wentworth Apthorp. Together they had 5 children: Sarah Apthorp Morton (1782–1844); Anna Louisa Morton (1783–1843); Frances Wentworth Morton (1785–1831); Charles Ward Apthorp Morton (1786–1809); and Charlotte Morton (1787–1819) From ca.1796 to ca.1803, the Mortons owned a house on Dudley Street in Dorchester; the house may have been designed by Charles Bulfinch. Friends and associates of Morton included James Bowdoin, John Adams, and James Swan.

In 1788, the Mortons were the subject of a public scandal regarding an illegitimate child of Sarah Morton's sister, Fanny Apthorp, rumored to have had an affair with Perez. The scandal was amplified in the press, notably the Massachusetts Centinel and the Herald of Freedom and the Federal Advertiser. A novel published anonymously in 1789, The Power of Sympathy, originally attributed to Mrs. Morton, depicted an adulterous affair between a man and his sister-in-law; at the time, many suspected the novel to be based on the real-life Morton/Apthorp affair. The novel is now known to have been authored by William Hill Brown, a young writer familiar with the scandal and the families concerned.

Morton served as Massachusetts Speaker of the House, 1806–1808, and 1810–1811; and as Massachusetts Attorney General, 1810-1832.

He died in Dorchester in 1837.

Portraits of Morton have been made by Charles Balthazar Julien Févret de Saint-Mémin, and others. Some items owned by Perez Morton are now in the collection of the Museum of Fine Arts, Boston, including a silver ladle made by Paul Revere.

Morton's daughter Charlotte was the wife of Andrew Dexter Jr.

Morton wrote the text of the hymn When Jesus Wept, music composed by William Billings.

Political offices
Preceded by Timothy Bigelow	Speaker of the Massachusetts House of Representatives; 1806–1808	Succeeded by Timothy Bigelow
Preceded by Timothy Bigelow	Speaker of the Massachusetts House of Representatives; 1810–1811	Succeeded by Joseph Story
Legal offices
Preceded by Barnabas Bidwell	Attorney General of Massachusetts; 1810–1832	Succeeded by James T. Austin
