= David Cobb (Massachusetts politician) =

American politician (1748–1830)

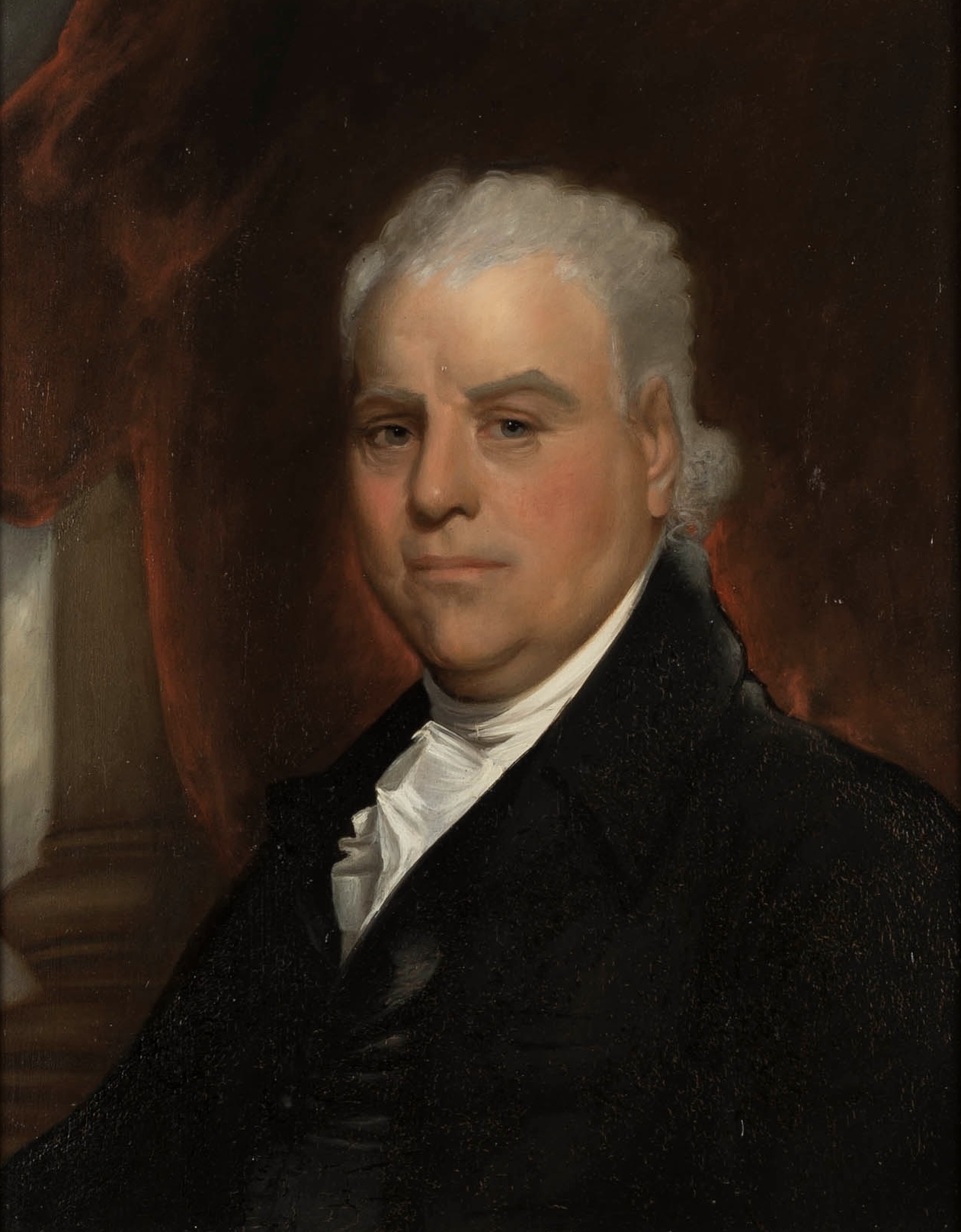
- Portrait by Chester Harding, after Gilbert Stuart, c. 1822–23

8th Lieutenant Governor of Massachusetts
- In office 1809–1810
- Governor: Christopher Gore
- Preceded by: Levi Lincoln Sr.
- Succeeded by: William Gray

Member of the U.S. House of Representatives from Massachusetts's at-large district
- In office March 4, 1793 – March 3, 1795
- Preceded by: Seat created
- Succeeded by: Seat eliminated

President of the Massachusetts Senate
- In office 1801–1805
- Preceded by: Samuel Phillips Jr.
- Succeeded by: Harrison Gray Otis

Speaker of the Massachusetts House of Representatives
- In office May 1789 – January 1793
- Preceded by: Theodore Sedgwick
- Succeeded by: Edward Robbins

Member of the Massachusetts House of Representatives
- In office May 1789 – January 1793

Personal details
- Born: September 14, 1748 Attleborough, Province of Massachusetts Bay, British America
- Died: April 17, 1830 (aged 81) Taunton, Massachusetts, U.S.
- Party: Federalist
- Spouse: Eleanor Bradish
- Relations: Robert Treat Paine, brother in law.
- Children: 11
- Profession: Physician

Military service
- Allegiance: United States Continental Congress
- Branch/service: Continental Army, Massachusetts Militia
- Years of service: 1776–1781, 1786
- Rank: lieutenant colonel, major general
- Unit: 16th Massachusetts Regiment-Henry Jackson's regiment Massachusetts Militia, aide-de-camp on the staff of General George Washington
- Commands: Fifth Division of the Massachusetts Militia
- Battles/wars: American Revolutionary War, New York and New Jersey campaign, Battle of Springfield, Battle of Monmouth. Battle of Rhode Island, Shays' Rebellion

David Cobb (September 14, 1748 – April 17, 1830) was a Massachusetts medical doctor, military officer, jurist, and politician who served as a U.S. Congressman for Massachusetts's at-large congressional seat.

== Biography ==
Born in Attleborough in the Province of Massachusetts Bay on September 14, 1748, Cobb graduated from Harvard College in 1766. He studied medicine in Boston and afterward practiced in Taunton. He was a member of the Massachusetts Provincial Congress in 1775; lieutenant colonel of Jackson's regiment in 1777 and 1778, serving in Rhode Island and New Jersey; was aide-de-camp on the staff of General George Washington; appointed major general of militia in 1786 and rendered conspicuous service during Shays' Rebellion. He was a charter member of the American Academy of Arts and Sciences in 1780. Cobb was also admitted as an original member of the Society of the Cincinnati in the state of Massachusetts at the conclusion of the war.

== Massachusetts government ==
He served as a judge of the Bristol County Court of Common Pleas 1784–1796, and as a member of the State House of Representatives 1789–1793, and the Massachusetts Senate, and served as Speaker of the Massachusetts House of Representatives and President of the Massachusetts Senate.

== Congress ==
Cobb was a candidate to represent the 7th congressional district in 1788, and the 6th congressional district in 1790.

Cobb was elected to the Third United States Congress (March 4, 1793 – March 3, 1795). He is the only person elected to the U.S. House via Massachusetts's at-large congressional seat.

== Maine ==
Cobb moved to Gouldsboro in the District of Maine in 1796 and engaged in agricultural pursuits; elected to the Massachusetts Senate from the eastern District of Maine in 1802 and served as president; elected to the Massachusetts Governor's Council in 1808; Lieutenant Governor of Massachusetts in 1809; member of the board of military defense in 1812; chief justice of the Hancock County (Maine) court of common pleas; returned in 1817 to Taunton, where he died on April 17, 1830. His remains were interred in Plain Cemetery.

Cobb was elected a member of the American Antiquarian Society in 1814.

== Legacy ==
In 1976, David Cobb was honored by being on a postage stamp for the United States Postal Service.

== Notes ==
Political offices
Preceded by [data missing]	Member of the Massachusetts House of Representatives; May 1789 – January 1793	Succeeded by [data missing]
Preceded by Theodore Sedgwick	Speaker of the Massachusetts House of Representatives; May 1789 – January 1793	Succeeded by Edward Robbins
U.S. House of Representatives
Preceded by Seat created	Member of the U.S. House of Representatives from Massachusetts's at-large congressional seat March 4, 1793 – March 3, 1795	Succeeded by Seat eliminated
Political offices
Preceded by [data missing]	Member of the Massachusetts State Senate; 1801–1805	Succeeded by [data missing]
Preceded by Samuel Phillips Jr.	President of the Massachusetts State Senate; 1801–1805	Succeeded by Harrison Gray Otis
Preceded by Levi Lincoln Sr.	Lieutenant Governor of Massachusetts; 1809–1810	Succeeded by William Gray
