= Elijah Brigham =

American politician (1751–1816)

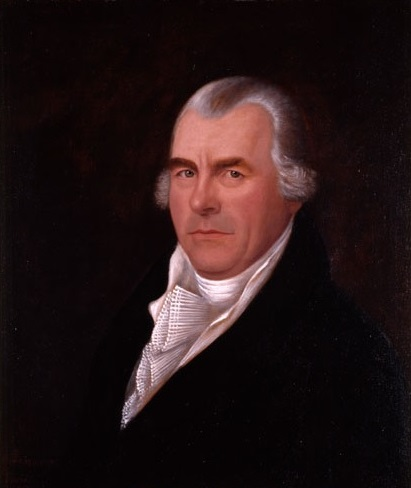

Member of the U.S. House of Representatives from Massachusetts
- In office March 4, 1811 – February 22, 1816
- Preceded by: Abijah Bigelow
- Succeeded by: Benjamin Adams (politician)
- Constituency: 10th district (1811–15); 11th district (1815–16)

Member of the Massachusetts House of Representatives
- In office 1791-1793

Member of the Massachusetts Senate
- In office 1796; 1798; 1801-1805; 1807-1810

Personal details
- Born: July 7, 1751 Westborough, Province of Massachusetts Bay, British America (now Northborough)
- Died: February 22, 1816 (aged 64) Washington, D.C., U.S.
- Resting place: Congressional Cemetery
- Party: Federalist
- Education: Dartmouth College

Elijah Brigham (July 7, 1751 – February 22, 1816) was a U.S. representative from Massachusetts.

Brigham was born in Westborough (now Northborough) in the Province of Massachusetts Bay, son of Colonel Levi Brigham and Susanna (Grout) Brigham. He was a descendant of Thomas Brigham and Edmund Rice, early immigrants to Massachusetts Bay Colony. Brigham was graduated from Dartmouth College, Hanover, New Hampshire, in 1778. He studied law, but did not practice. He engaged in mercantile pursuits at Westborough. He served as member of the State house of representatives 1791–1793. He served as justice of the court of common pleas 1795–1811. He served in the State senate in 1796, 1798 from 1801 to 1805, and 1807–1810. He served as a state councilor in 1799, 1800, and 1806.

Brigham was elected as a Federalist to the Twelfth, Thirteenth, and Fourteenth Congresses and served from March 4, 1811, until his death in Washington, D.C., February 22, 1816. He was interred in the Congressional Cemetery.

Brigham was elected a member of the American Antiquarian Society in 1813.

== See also ==
- List of members of the United States Congress who died in office (1790–1899)

U.S. House of Representatives
Preceded by Joseph Allen	Member of the U.S. House of Representatives from Massachusetts's 10th congressional district 1811–1815	Succeeded by Laban Wheaton
Preceded by Abijah Bigelow	Member of the U.S. House of Representatives from Massachusetts's 11th congressional district 1815–1816	Succeeded by Benjamin Adams
