= Henry F. Hurlburt =

American lawyer and politician (1836–1900)

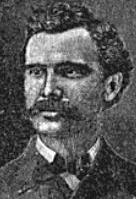

District Attorney of Essex County, Massachusetts
- In office 1884–1890
- Preceded by: Henry P. Moulton
- Succeeded by: William Henry Moody

Personal details
- Born: June 29, 1854 Boston, Massachusetts, U.S.
- Died: April 16, 1924 (aged 69) Brookline, Massachusetts, U.S.
- Party: Democratic
- Occupation: Lawyer

Henry Francis Hurlburt (June 29, 1854 – April 16, 1924) was an American lawyer and politician who was district attorney of Essex County, Massachusetts from 1884 to 1890, twice served as president of the Boston Bar Association, and was the chief prosecutor of Middlesex County district attorney Nathan A. Tufts.

== Early life ==
Hurlburt was born on June 29, 1854 in Boston. When he was 7 years old, his family moved to Hudson, Massachusetts. He attended Hudson public schools and graduated from Cornell University in 1871.

== Legal career ==
Hurlburt studied law in the office of Burbank & Lund. He admitted to the bar in 1877 and established a law office in Lynn, Massachusetts. He was district attorney of Essex County, Massachusetts from 1884 to 1890. He was the Democratic nominee for Massachusetts Attorney General in 1894 and 1896.

In 1897, Hurlburt formed a partnership in Boston with Boyd B. Jones which became the firm of Hurlburt, Jones, & Cabot. In 1908, Hurlburt defended Speaker of the Massachusetts House of Representatives John N. Cole, who was indicted by a grand jury on 123 separate counts of violating a law which prohibited Government officers from asking for railroad passes or tickets at reduced rates for themselves or others. On February 11, 1908, the indictment was quashed by the Chief Justice of the Essex Superior Court. In 1909 he defended structural steel corporations accused of collusive bidding. The trial ended with an acquittal. In 1911, Hurlburt and Charles F. Choate defended former Boston city treasurer George U. Crocker, who was accused of bribing a jury that ruled on his father's will. The charges were dropped by district attorney Joseph C. Pelletier, who stated that the indictments had been based false evidence. In 1913, Hurlburt and Samuel L. Powers defended American Woolen Company president William Madison Wood, who was accused with conspiring to plant dynamite to sway public opinion against workers during the 1912 Lawrence textile strike. Wood was acquitted on June 6, 1913. In 1917 he was legal counsel for the Boston Finance Commission during its investigation into the city's bonding. In 1919, he represented 17 fish dealers who were accused of unfair competition and conspiring to raise prices during a time of war. All 17 were convicted and received sentences ranging from six months to a year in the House of Correction. The verdicts were upheld by the Massachusetts Supreme Judicial Court in 1923. In 1920, Hurlburt represented the Eastern Massachusetts Street Railway in arbitration hearings with the Carmen's Union.

Hurlburt served as a special assistant to Massachusetts Attorney General J. Weston Allen. In 1920, He prosecuted an automobile ring accused of stealing hundreds of vehicles in Middlesex and Suffolk counties. In 1921, he prosecuted Middlesex County district attorney Nathan A. Tufts, who was accused of 32 allegations of malfeasance, misfeasance, and nonfensance. On October 1, 1921, the Massachusetts Supreme Judicial Court found Tufts guilty of misconduct and removed him from office. It was the first time since 1861 (when Suffolk County District Attorney George W. Cooley was committed to an asylum) that a district attorney in Massachusetts had been removed from office. Later that year, Hurlburt was elected president of the Boston Bar Association. He led the organization during its effort to disbar Daniel H. Coakley, William J. Corcoran, Daniel V. McIssac, John P. Leahy, and Joseph F. Warren and remove Suffolk County district attorney Joseph C. Pelletier from office.

Hurlburt became ill after the Tufts trial. He underwent an operation and spent time in Florida in hopes to regain his health. He never recovered and died on April 16, 1924 at Trumbull Hospital in Brookline, Massachusetts.
