= H. Huestis Newton =

American jurist and politician (1860–1931)

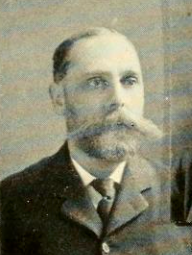
- Newton as a member of the Massachusetts House of Representatives

Mayor of Everett, Massachusetts
- In office 1905
- Preceded by: Thomas J. Boynton
- Succeeded by: Thomas J. Boynton

Member of the Massachusetts House of Representatives from the 10th Middlesex District
- In office 1898–1904
- Preceded by: George A. Brown
- Succeeded by: William E. Weeks/Wilmot R. Evans Jr.

Personal details
- Born: December 2, 1860 Truro, Massachusetts, U.S.
- Died: December 14, 1931 (aged 71) Everett, Massachusetts, U.S.
- Party: Republican (1892–1905, 1917–1931); Progressive Party (1913–1917)
- Education: Boston University

H. Huestis Newton (December 2, 1860 – December 14, 1931) was an American jurist and politician who was a member of the Massachusetts House of Representatives, mayor of Everett, Massachusetts, and a judge of the Malden District Court.

== Early life ==
Newton was born on December 2, 1860, in Truro, Massachusetts. He was educated in the public schools of Chatham and Provincetown. He graduated from Boston University in 1883 and spent twelve years as a teacher in Essex, West Newbury, and Wellfleet, Massachusetts.

== Legal and political career ==
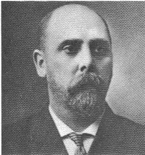
Newton as mayor

Newton was admitted to the bar in Barnstable County, Massachusetts in 1886. In 1897, he began practicing law in Boston and Everett.

From 1892 to 1896, Newton was a member of the Everett school committee. In 1893, he was a private secretary to Everett mayor Alonzo H. Evans. From 1895 to 1899, he was Everett's city solicitor.

From 1898 to 1904, Newton was a member of the Massachusetts House of Representatives. He was House chairman of committee on taxation and election laws in 1899, cities and rules in 1900, judiciary and on rules in 1901, judiciary and on rules in 1902 and 1903, and metropolitan affairs in 1904.

In 1904, Newton was elected mayor of Everett by a plurality of 1,332 votes. He was opposed for renomination by former mayor Arthur W. Hatch. Newton defeated Hatch in the Republican caucuses 1,557 votes to 1,429. He was beaten in the general election by nonpartisan candidate Thomas J. Boynton by 163 votes.

In 1913, Newton was the Progressive Party nominee for Massachusetts Attorney General. He received 82,821 votes, which put him in a distant third behind Democratic nominee Thomas J. Boynton (168,176) and Republican incumbent James M. Swift (159,824). He was the party's nominee in the Massachusetts's 9th congressional district in the 1914 United States House of Representatives elections and received 11.9% of the vote to Republican incumbent Ernest W. Roberts's 54.8% and Democrat Peter W. Collins 33.3%.

In 1923, Newton was reappointed city solicitor by mayor Lester Chisholm. In 1927, he was appointed by Governor Alvan T. Fuller to fill a vacancy on the Malden District Court caused by the resignation of E. Leroy Sweetser. He held both positions until December 14, 1931, when he collapsed and died at his office in Everett city hall.

== Notes ==
1. The 10th Middlesex District sent two representatives to the Massachusetts House of Representatives during Newton's tenure. In 1905, Newton and J. Howard Nason were succeeded by William E. Weeks and Wilmot R. Evans Jr.
