= W. Scott Peters =

American lawyer and politician

District Attorney for Essex County, Massachusetts
- In office 1899–1911
- Preceded by: Alden P. White
- Succeeded by: Henry C. Atwill

Personal details
- Born: Winfield Scott Peters; May 25, 1861 Porter, Maine, U.S.
- Died: July 20, 1919 (aged 58) Hampton Beach, New Hampshire, U.S.
- Resting place: St. Mary's Cemetery; Lawrence, Massachusetts
- Party: Republican
- Education: Boston University School of Law
- Occupation: Lawyer

Winfield Scott Peters (May 25, 1861 – July 20, 1919) was an American lawyer and politician who served as District Attorney of Essex County, Massachusetts from 1899 to 1911.

== Early life ==
Peters was born in Porter, Maine. His family moved to Haverhill, Massachusetts when he was 14 years old. He graduated from Haverhill High School and the Boston University School of Law.

== Public service ==
Peters was elected Haverhill city solicitor in 1894. In 1898 he was elected district attorney of Essex County. In 1901, Peters, Massachusetts Attorney General Hosea M. Knowlton, and Assistant District Attorney Roland H. Sherman prosecuted John C. Best for the murder of George E. Bailey. Best was found guilty of murder in the first degree. Peters was unable to run for reelection in 1910 due to term-limits, so he ran for the 4th Essex District seat in the Massachusetts Senate. He lost the Republican nomination to incumbent Arthur L. Nason. The main issue in the campaign was that year's United States Senate election. Nason supported Butler Ames and Peters backed Henry Cabot Lodge.

== Private practice ==
In 1905, Peters was retained by two cousins of Stephen Salisbury III who sought to contest his will. Salisbury left the bulk of his estate to the Worcester Art Museum and the cousins were two of the five blood relatives not mentioned in Salisbury's will.

Peters represented Jessie M. Chapman, who was arrested for killing her neighbor and former friend, Eva F. Ingalls. On May 15, 1913, Chapman pleaded guilty to murder in the second degree.

He defended Arturo Giovannitti, a leader of the 1912 Lawrence textile strike who was charged with the murder of Anna LoPizzo, a striker who was killed in the protest. Giovannitti and co-defendants Joseph James Ettor and Joseph Caruso were found not guilty. In 1913 he was counsel for Charles L. Eaton, who was charged with manslaughter in the shooting of Michael Bernstein. The case ended in a mistrial when the jury was unable to reach a verdict.

In 1916, Peters defended Haverhill mayor Albert L. Bartlett and aldermen Roswell L. Wood, Albert E. Stickney, Charles M. Hoyt, and Christopher C. Cook, who were charged with failure to suppress an unlawful assembly after the Leyden riot. The jury returned not guilty verdicts on all of the charges against Hoyt and on one of the two charges against Bartlett. They were unable to come to an agreement on the charges against Cook, Wood, and Stickney.

In 1919 Peters represented the Haverhill Shoe Manufacturers' Association in negotiations with the Shoe Workers' Protective Union, who were represented by Frederick Mansfield.

== Death ==
Peters died suddenly on July 20, 1919, in Hampton Beach, New Hampshire.
