= Asa P. French =

American attorney

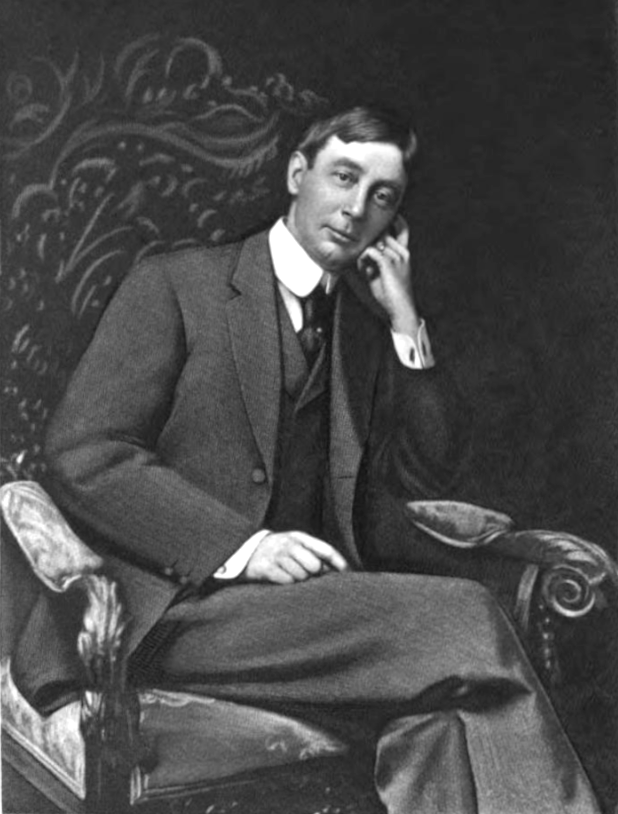

United States Attorney for the District of Massachusetts
- In office 1906–1914
- Preceded by: Melvin O. Adams
- Succeeded by: George W. Anderson

Personal details
- Born: January 29, 1860 Braintree, Massachusetts; United States
- Died: September 17, 1935 (aged 75) Wellesley, Massachusetts; United States
- Resting place: Central Cemetery, Randolph, Massachusetts
- Party: Republican
- Spouse: Elisabeth Ambrose Wales
- Education: Yale University
- Occupation: Attorney
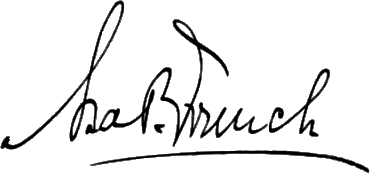
- Signature

Asa Palmer French (January 29, 1860 – September 17, 1935) was an American attorney who served as the United States Attorney for the District of Massachusetts from 1906 to 1914.

== Early life ==
French was born on January 29, 1860. His father was a Commissioner of the Court of Alabama Claims. In 1877 French began attending Thayer Academy as one of its first students and was a member of its first ever graduating class in 1878. In 1882 he graduated from Yale University, where he served on the tenth editorial board of The Yale Record and was a member of Skull and Bones. He subsequently studied law at Boston University.

== Career ==
In 1896, French came to prominence, with James E. Cotter, as court-appointed junior counsel for Thomas M. Bram, who was successfully prosecuted by Sherman Hoar, with Justice Edward Douglass White presiding, then sentenced to hang, for a triple axe-murder committed aboard the Herbert Fuller on the high seas. French and Cotter secured a second trial on writ of error, Bram v. United States, but he was, again, found guilty. Bram maintained his innocence, was released from prison in 1913, became a successful restaurateur, and was pardoned by President Woodrow Wilson, in 1919.

From 1901 to 1906, French was the district attorney for the Southeastern District of Massachusetts. In 1905 he was an unsuccessful candidate for the Republican nomination for Massachusetts Attorney General. In 1906, he was appointed by President Theodore Roosevelt to serve as the United States Attorney for the District of Massachusetts. He was re-appointed by President William Howard Taft in 1910 and remained U.S. Attorney until November 1, 1914 when he resigned to enter private practice.

In 1916, he testified before the United States Senate during the confirmation hearings of United States Supreme Court nominee Louis Brandeis. Of Brandeis, French said: "Mr. Brandeis has, in my experience, the reputation of being a man of integrity, a man of honor, a man who is conscientiously striving for what he believes to be right".

French was elected to serve as a member of the Massachusetts Constitutional Convention of 1917, representing the Massachusetts Fourteenth Congressional District.

In 1920, French was a counsel for the complainants in a $150,000,000 suit against William Rockefeller and other former directors of the New York, New Haven & Hartford Railroad. He split a fee of more than $800,000 with four other lawyers.

French died on November 17, 1935.

== Anti-vivisection ==
French was an opponent of vivisection. He was president of the New England Anti-Vivisection Society from 1922 to 1930.
