= George Marston =

George Marston may refer to:

- George Marston (Massachusetts politician) (1821–1883), American politician, and Massachusetts attorney general
- George Marston (California politician) (1850–1946), American politician, department store owner, and philanthropist
- George Marston (artist) (1882–1940), English artist who twice accompanied Sir Ernest Shackleton on expeditions to Antarctic
