= Attorney General Wyman =

Attorney General Wyman may refer to:

- Henry A. Wyman (1861–1935), Acting Attorney General of Massachusetts
- Louis C. Wyman (1917–2002), Attorney General of New Hampshire
