= John J. Mullen (mayor) =

American politician (1876–1952)

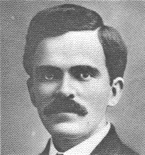

Mayor of Everett, Massachusetts
- In office January 1, 1917 – January 7, 1918
- Preceded by: James Chambers
- Succeeded by: William E. Weeks

Personal details
- Born: May 22, 1876 Boston, Massachusetts, U.S.
- Died: June 17, 1952 (aged 76) Lynn, Massachusetts, U.S.
- Party: Democratic
- Occupation: Plumber; Auto supply store owner; Blacksmith; Relator

John J. Mullen (May 22, 1876 – June 17, 1952) was an American politician who served as Mayor of Everett, Massachusetts from 1917 to 1918.

== Boston Common Council ==
Mullen began his political career as a member of the Boston Common Council in 1900. During his tenure on the council he introduced an order to heat all of the city's streets and sidewalks with steam pipes so snow would melt away immediately. He remained on the council until 1902, when he left Boston to open a plumbing business in Everett. He later owned an auto supply store, worked as a blacksmith, and sold real estate.

== Everett ==
=== Board of aldermen ===
Mullen was elected to the Everett Board of Aldermen in 1914, representing Ward 4. In January 1915, Mullen proposed a series of orders that were referred to committees. Each time, he tried to secure a suspension of the rules to have them voted on at the meeting. One of Mullen's proposals, which would abolish the city's Board of Public Works, caused so much noise and applause from the audience that the chairman threatened to clear the hall. Mayor James Chambers later commented that "Mullen was trying the spend the city's money like a drunken sailor" by proposing several orders that would've increased public expenditure. That March, he walked out of a meeting to avoid voting on the city's budget, which would cause the budget to be referred back to the Finance Committee. Alderman Fred C. Hansen stated that Mullen had "sneaked away like a yellow dog" as part of what The Boston Daily Globe described as "one of the most scathing speeches ever made in the local board by one member to another". At the following meeting he was removed from the chamber by a police officer and suspended for 2 meetings by Board Chairman George W. Faulkner after he refused to come to order. Mullen planned on holding a public meeting in Everett Square on April 15 regarding his suspension, but a Salvation Army band from Malden was playing there and he was unable to speak. After he was refused a permit by the police department, he moved his meeting to the nearest vacant lot. In July he protested the construction of a Benzol manufacturing plant in South Everett. He claimed that he had received death threats over his opposition to the project. On August 2, while the Board and the Common Council were in a joint executive session, Mullen and Hansen got into a physical altercation. Mullen pressed charges against Hansen and he was convicted of assault.

Mullen challenged Mayor Chambers in the 1915 election. He lost by 700 votes.

In January 1916 Mullen charged the Board of Public Works with paying employees for days they never worked. After an investigation cleared the Public Works Board, the Board of Aldermen approved an order that demanded Mullen apologize to the Mayor and the Board of Public Works for his accusations or face suspension. Mullen declared that he would not apologize and that the Board did not have the legal authority to suspend him. At the next meeting, Mullen was asked by Chairman Clinton E. Hobbs to leave. Mullen made no reply and was removed from the meeting by a police officer and arrested for disturbing the peace and disturbing a public meeting.

=== Mayor ===
On December 12, 1916, Mullen defeated Chairman Hobbs and former State Representative Frank B. Rich to become mayor of Everett. After his victory was announced, a crowd of supporters went to Mullen's home and convinced him to get in an automobile that they had brought and proceed to City Hall. Once there, he was carried on their shoulders into the Council Chamber, where he stood on the Clerk's desk and made an impromptu speech. At the time of the election, Mullen was still suspended by the Board of Aldermen.

Mullen was sworn into office on January 1, 1917, at the State Armory. A crowd of 4000 attended and an additional 1000 had to be turned away. Some of Mullen's political opponents held an alternate inauguration at the High School, which was attended by 21 people.

During his first months as mayor, Mullen fought a proposed law that would create a primary for municipal elections, which he felt would be an unnecessary expense and aimed at defeating him. He also closed the Everett Tuberculosis Hospital due to poor conditions.

During a February 27 meeting of the Board of Aldermen, Mullen got into a heated exchange with Alderman Winfield S. Hamlin after Hamlin accused him of violating the city charter by not making certain appointments. He further accused the Mayor of purchasing supplies at a higher price than ever before and of planning to give away city property while acting in place of some of the officials he removed. He also allegedly stated that members of the Common Council had been threatened with political extinction by members of Everett's Police Department if they did not vote to raise police salaries. In response to this allegation, Mullen called a public meeting and had every member of the Police Department questioned by City Solicitor John F. Casey. The hearing resulted in the exoneration of the entire police department and Mullen demanded Hamlin's expulsion. A special meeting of the Board of Aldermen was held on March 15 to address Mullen's request. At the meeting Hamlin said that his statement was based on a letter published in a newspaper the previous year and that it was members of the Fire Department, not the Police Department who had made the threats. He apologized for any injustice his misstatement might have caused.

At the May 15 meeting, Mullen remarked that "Some Aldermen are not fit to associate with decent people." Believing this was directed at him, Hamlin asked the Mayor "Are you referring to me?" Mullen responded by saying "What if I am?" After Hamlin told Mullen that he had no right to be there, Mullen stated that no one could put him out. Hamlin then rushed the Mayor and punched him in the jaw. Mullen demanded that the two police officers present in City Hall arrest Hamlin, but they refused. Mullen then had Police Chief William E. Hill called from his home and ordered him to order the two officers to arrest Hamlin. Hill refused Mullen's order, as the officers did not witness the assault and therefore did not have grounds to arrest Hamlin. Mullen then got into an argument with State Representative Howard Furness who told Mullen that the officers should take him to Danvers. Mullen then ordered Hill to arrest Furness. When Hill refused, Mullen demanded his resignation. Hill refused and Mullen then went into his office and dictated a letter ordering Hill's suspension. The Massachusetts Supreme Judicial Court reinstated Hill on July 25, but on August 3 Mullen again suspended him, this time making himself acting police chief.

On June 9, Mullen fenced off Revere Beach Parkway at the junction of Broadway because the Metropolitan District Commission refused to station an officer there to guard the crossing, which they felt was the City of Everett's job. He was ordered by a judge not to take such action again.

In an effort to reach quorums, Mullen ordered members of the automobile police patrol to go to the homes of absent Councilors and Aldermen. Although he was able to reach a quorum at the Commons Council meeting, all of the absent Aldermen refused to leave their homes and the meeting was called off.

Mullen also fought the Malden Gas and Electric Light Company and the Massachusetts Gas and Electric Commission over a five cent increase in Everett's gas prices. Mullen ejected the Massachusetts Gas and Electric Commission from City Hall in the middle of a hearing after they refused to hear him when he wanted to speak.

On December 11, Mullen was defeated by former State Representative William E. Weeks by 230 votes. The Boston Daily Globe described the race between Mullen and Weeks as "one of the bitterest campaigns in years" and in his inaugural address, Weeks referred to Mullen as a "caterwauling demagogue" and vowed to overturn many of his acts, including firing of Hill and the closure of the Tuberculous Hospital.

=== Final years in Everett ===
In 1919, Mullen ran for mayor again. He finished third in the primary behind Weeks and ex-city engineer Christopher Harrison. Harrison defeated Weeks by 390 votes, with Mullen, who supported Harrison after being eliminated in the preliminary election, taking credit for "putting [him] over".

In 1920, Mullen finished first in the primary over former state representative Fred Greenwood and Christopher Harrison. However, a recount showed that Harrison finished ahead of Greenwood. Harrison then went on to defeat Mullen in the general election.

Mullen ran a sticker campaign for mayor in 1921. He finished behind Mayor Harrison but ahead of Fred Greenwood, who finished second in the primaries.

In 1922, Mullen chose not to run for mayor and instead backed Dr. Lester Chisholm.

Mullen ran again in 1924, 1925, and 1926, but was eliminated in the primaries each time.

== Saugus ==
In 1927, Mullen moved to Saugus, Massachusetts. That same year he was involved in a dispute with police chief Roland Mansfield, which resulted in Mullen trying to remove Mansfield from office.

In 1928 he was a candidate for the Saugus Board of Selectmen. He finished in last place with 700 votes.

Mullen championed a bill in the Massachusetts General Court that would deepen the Saugus River so that boats could proceed up to Saugus. The Legislative Committee on Harbors and Public Lands approved the bill, but later requested and was granted leave to withdraw.

In 1930 he was a candidate for the Massachusetts House of Representatives in the 10th Essex District. He lost in the Democratic Primary.

Mullen also served as Chairman of Saugus Democratic Committee and as a member of the Saugus Dock Commission.

In February 1931, Mullen had the lights turned off on State Representative C. F. Nelson Pratt while he was speaking during a meeting of the Saugus Democratic Committee.

After Massachusetts legalized pari-mutuel wagering in 1934, Mullen a group of area businessmen and government officials attempted to bring horse racing back to the Old Saugus Race Track. Mullen even arranged a meeting with his friend Governor Joseph B. Ely in an attempt to get his assistance. Ely refused to express any opinion on the matter and stated that the matter was for the Racing Commission to decide. A charter was granted to the Saugus Racing Association, Inc. by the Secretary of State's Office in January 1935 with Mullen listed as an incorporator.

In 1935, he filed a complaint against the Board of Selectmen with the Massachusetts Attorney General's office for failing to publish a list of townspeople eligible for jury duty. Prior to Mullen's complaint, people were selected for jury duty from a list of 50 acquaintances of the Selectmen.

=== Board of Assessors ===
In 1931, Mullen was elected to the Saugus Board of Assessors on a platform of lowering taxes. At the time he was elected, the tax rate was $40.90. In 1932 the rate was reduced to $34.85. The following year it was reduced to $30. In 1934 it was $29.80. By 1937 it had risen to $36.90. During his tenure on the board, the assessors fought with the State Tax Board over the rate the assessors taxed a 1500-foot tract of marshland.

In 1939, Assessor Daniel B. Willis died and Alexander S. Addison was appointed to succeed him. Mullen contended that Addison was not a legal member of the board and refused to attend meetings as long as Addison was a member. On December 26, the Board removed him as chairman due to his refusal to attend meetings. He was defeated by Albion B. Rice 2296 votes to 1410 in the 1941 election.

Mullen ran again in 1945, but lost to John Mason 2138 votes to 1437.

=== Board of Selectmen ===
In 1936 Mullen was elected to the Board of Selectmen. On August 4 he was elected chairman of the board by a vote of 2 to 0. The absent member, C. F. Nelson Pratt was chairman prior to the meeting and was informed when he showed up 15 minutes into the meeting that he no longer held the position. That October, Mullen was accused by Pratt of coercing Works Progress Administration workers by threatening to have them fired if they did not vote for President Franklin D. Roosevelt and telling them they were expected to attend a Democratic Party Rally at Saugus Town Hall. Mullen later accused Pratt of assaulting him, but the charges were not pressed due to lack of evidence. Mullen issued himself a permit for a .38 caliber pistol for protection against Pratt. After it was learned that Mullen had issued himself a gun permit, a group of citizens stoned his home. Both Pratt and Mullen were defeated in the 1937 election.

== Death ==
Mullen died on June 17, 1952, in Lynn, Massachusetts.
