= List of mayors of Everett, Massachusetts =

This is a list of the past and present mayors of Everett, Massachusetts.

No.	Picture	Mayor	Term
1		Alonzo H. Evans	January 2, 1893–1894
2		Francis Batchelder	1894–January 7, 1895
3		John S. Cate	January 7, 1895–1896
4		John D. Henderson	1896–1897
5		John S. Cate	1897–January 3, 1898
6		Francis E. Dyer	January 3, 1898–1899
7		Arthur W. Hatch	1899–January 1, 1900
8		Charles C. Nichols	January 1, 1900–January 2, 1902
9		Charles Bruce	January 2, 1902–January 4, 1904
10		Thomas J. Boynton	January 4, 1904–1905
11		H. Huestis Newton	1905–1906
12		Thomas J. Boynton	1906–January 6, 1908
13		Charles Bruce	January 6, 1908–January 2, 1911
14		Herbert P. Wasgatt	January 2, 1911–January 2, 1912
15		James Chambers	January 2, 1912–January 1, 1917
16		John J. Mullen	January 1, 1917–January 7, 1918
17		William E. Weeks	January 7, 1918–1919
18		Christopher Harrison	1919–1923
19		Lester Chisholm	1923–January 2, 1928
20		James A. Roche	January 2, 1928–January 6, 1930
21		Michael C. O'Neill	January 6, 1930–January 2, 1934
22		James A. Roche	January 2, 1934–January 6, 1936
23		Frank E. Lewis	January 6, 1936–July 17, 1947
A		Ambrose T. English (Acting)	July 17, 1947–1948
24		James F. Reynolds	1948–January 3, 1950
25		Philip J. Crowley	January 3, 1950–January 3, 1966
26		James R. Plunkett	January 3, 1966–January 2, 1968
27		George R. McCarthy	January 2, 1968–September 20, 1978
A		A. William Apruzzese (Acting)	September 20, 1978–1979
28		Edward G. Connolly	1979–January 6, 1986
29		John R. McCarthy	January 6, 1986–January 5, 1998
30		David Ragucci	January 5, 1998–January 3, 2006
31		John F. Hanlon	January 3, 2006–January 7, 2008
32		Carlo DeMaria, Jr.	January 7, 2008–January 5, 2026
33		Robert Van Campen	January 5, 2026—

== See also ==
- Everett history
