= John Slayton =

John Slayton may refer to:

- John W. Slayton, American socialist lecturer and politician
- John C. F. Slayton, American produce dealer and politician in Massachusetts

== See also ==
- John M. Slaton, governor of Georgia
