= William J. Corcoran =

William J. Corcoran may refer to:

- Bill Corcoran, Canadian film and television director
- William J. Corcoran (attorney), American attorney and criminal
