= Arthur W. Hatch =

American politician (1865–1925)

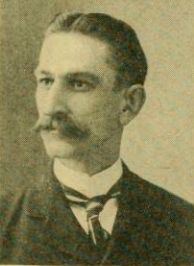
- Hatch as a member of the Massachusetts House of Representatives

Member of the Massachusetts House of Representatives from the 10th Middlesex District
- In office 1902–1903
- Preceded by: Edward C. Mead
- Succeeded by: J. Howard Nason

Mayor of Everett, Massachusetts
- In office 1899
- Preceded by: Francis E. Dyer
- Succeeded by: Charles C. Nichols

Personal details
- Born: December 26, 1865 South Malden, Massachusetts, U.S.
- Died: April 1, 1925 (aged 59)
- Party: Republican

Arthur W. Hatch (December 26, 1865 – April 1, 1925) was an American politician who was mayor of Everett, Massachusetts in 1899.

== Early life and professional career ==
Hatch was born in Everett (then known as South Malden) on December 26, 1865. He was educated in the Everett Public Schools.

In 1886, Hatch began working for Stone & Downer, a customs house brokerage. He left the company in 1889, but returned the following year as manager of the drawback department. He later became company treasurer, a position he held until his death.

== Politics ==
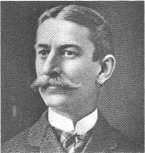
Hatch as mayor

Hatch was elected to the Everett board of aldermen in 1895 and reelected in 1897. He was president of the board in 1897 and 1898. In 1898, he was elected mayor over ex-alderman Dudley B. Bailey by 119 votes. In 1899, after two other candidates, Charles C. Nichols and George A. Brown, entered the race, Hatch announced he would not run for reelection.

Hatch represented the 10th Middlesex district in the Massachusetts House of Representatives during the 1902 and 1903 Massachusetts legislatures. He was a member of the House committee on cities in 1902 and the ways and means committee in 1903.

Hatch was the Republican nominee for mayor in 1903, but lost to nonpartisan candidate Thomas J. Boynton by a plurality of 414 votes. In 1905, he opposed Everett's incumbent mayor, H. Huestis Newton, for renomination. Newton defeated Hatch in the Republican caucuses 1557 votes to 1429. In 1909, he challenged Charles Bruce, who was seeking a fifth non-consecutive term as mayor. Bruce defeated Hatch 2330 votes to 1298.

== Later life and death ==
Hatch spent his later years in Milton, Massachusetts. He died after surgery on April 1, 1925. He had been ill for eight weeks prior.
