= Henry P. Moulton =

American politician

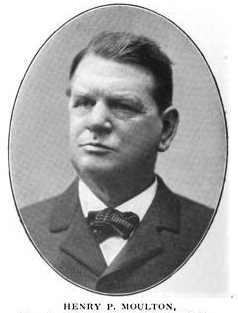

United States Attorney for the District of Massachusetts
- In office 1901–1905
- Preceded by: Boyd B. Jones
- Succeeded by: Melvin O. Adams

District Attorney for Essex County, Massachusetts
- In office 1883–1884
- Preceded by: Edgar J. Sherman
- Succeeded by: Henry F. Hurlburt

Personal details
- Born: November 24, 1844 Beverly, Massachusetts
- Died: December 4, 1905 (aged 61) Salem, Massachusetts
- Education: Amherst College
- Occupation: Attorney

Henry Percy Moulton (1844-1905) was an American attorney who served as the United States Attorney for the District of Massachusetts from March 20, 1901 until his death on December 4, 1905.

== Early life ==
Moulton was born and raised in Beverly, Massachusetts. He was a member of Beverly High School's first graduating class. He graduated from Amherst College in 1865 and spent the next three years studying law.

== Legal career ==
Moulton was admitted to the Massachusetts Bar in 1868 and began a practice in Essex County, Massachusetts. In 1870 he was elected to the Massachusetts General Court. After one year Moulton chose to leave the state legislature and focus full-time on his law practice.

On December 31, 1882 he was appointed by Governor John Davis Long to serve as Essex County District Attorney. He finished the year remaining on the unexpired term of Edgar J. Sherman, who had been elected Massachusetts Attorney General, but did not run for a full term.

Moulton was appointed United States Attorney for the District of Massachusetts on March 20, 1901 by President William McKinley. In 1903, at the direction of President Theodore Roosevelt, he appointed William H. Lewis to serve as an Assistant United States Attorney, making Lewis the first African-American to hold such a position.

== Death ==
Moulton died unexpectedly on the morning of December 4, 1905 at his home in Salem, Massachusetts. The cause of death was suspected to be Heart failure.

== Personal life ==
Moulton was married to Harriet E. Stocker of Beverly. They had four children: Edith Foster Moulton, Susy Pressey Moulton, Henry Philip Moulton, and John Richard Moulton.
