= Scott Peters =

Scott Peters may refer to:

- Scott Peters (American football) (born 1978), football coach for the Cincinnati Bengals
- Scott Peters (musician), musician with the Canadian folk rock band Captain Tractor
- Scott Peters (politician) (born 1958), U.S. Congressman from San Diego
- Scott Peters (writer), Canadian television producer, television director and screenwriter
- W. Scott Peters (1861–1919), American lawyer and politician
- Scott Peters (runner), winner of the 1992 4 × 800 meter relay at the NCAA Division I Indoor Track and Field Championships
