= Nathan A. Tufts =

American attorney and politician (1879–1952)

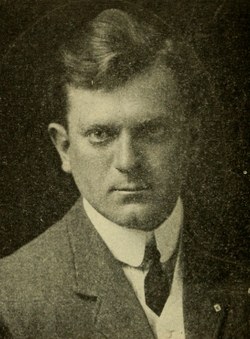

District Attorney of Middlesex County, Massachusetts
- In office 1917–1921
- Preceded by: William J. Corcoran
- Succeeded by: Endicott Peabody Saltonstall

Member of the Massachusetts Senate for the 5th Middlesex District
- In office 1915–1916
- Preceded by: George P. Drury
- Succeeded by: Charles Sumner Smith

Member of the Massachusetts House of Representatives
- In office 1910–1914

Personal details
- Born: April 15, 1879 Fitchburg, Massachusetts
- Died: November 8, 1952 (aged 73) Pitman, New Jersey
- Party: Republican
- Education: Brown University; Boston University Law School
- Occupation: Lawyer; Politician; Hotel Manager

Nathan A. Tufts (April 15, 1879 – November 8, 1952) was an American attorney and politician who served as a district attorney of Middlesex County, Massachusetts, from 1917 to 1921. He was removed from office and disbarred for official misconduct.

== Early life ==
Tufts was born on April 15, 1879, in Fitchburg, Massachusetts. He graduated from Brown University in 1900 and Boston University Law School in 1903. He was admitted to the bar in 1903 and opened a law office in Waltham, Massachusetts.

Tufts was a noted football player at Fitchburg High School and Brown. From 1907 to 1909, he was the head football coach at Waltham High School. He was replaced in 1910 by the school's athletic director, Harry A. Dame. Tufts also served for many years as a referee for college football games.

In 1909, he served as legal counsel for Hattie Le Blanc, a 16-year-old Acadian maid from West Arichat, Nova Scotia, accused of murdering her employer, Clarence F. Glover of East Cambridge. Le Blanc was found not guilty.

== Political career ==
Tufts began his political career in 1907 as a member of the Waltham Board of Alderman. From 1910 to 1914, he was a member of the Massachusetts House of Representatives, where he served as chairman of the committees on engrossed bills and legal affairs. From 1915 to 1916, he represented the Fifth Middlesex District in the Massachusetts Senate. He served as chairman of the Senate taxation committee and the special legislative taxation committee.

In 1916, Tufts was elected District Attorney for Middlesex County, Massachusetts. During his tenure as DA, Tufts personally obtained evidence that led to the conviction of the unsolved murder of a child. He also obtained the convictions of Francisco Feci for the murder of Louis Fred Soulia, Frank S. Ramey for the assault of Mildred Wanamaker, and Charles S. Whittemore, Louis "Poco" Bennett, and Charles Mortalli for their roles in the armed robbery of the Everett General Electric Plant's payroll. During World War I he was active in seizing Communist literature. He was reelected in 1919.

=== Removal from office ===
On January 19, 1921, Massachusetts Attorney General J. Weston Allen released a report accusing Tufts of falsely reporting the city of escaped murderer Herman L. Barney's surrender because Barney wanted to conceal this information so that those who had aided him while he was in hiding could not be prosecuted. Tufts, Allen alleged, agreed to this to further his own political career, which included a possible campaign for Governor of Massachusetts. He later accused Tufts and attorneys Daniel H. Coakley and William J. Corcoran of extorting money from Paramount Studio executives (including Adolph Zukor, Jesse L. Lasky, and Hiram Abrams) who attended a party at Mishawum Manor, a Woburn, Massachusetts, brothel. On May 26, Allen petitioned the Massachusetts Supreme Judicial Court for Tufts' removal. He accused Tufts of 32 allegations of malfeasance, misfeasance, and nonfensance. It was the first time since 1861 (when Suffolk County District Attorney George W. Cooley was committed to an asylum) that the Attorney General had petitioned for the removal of a district attorney from office. Tufts accused Allen of political animosity over his support for another candidate in the previous election and his opposition to legislation supported by Allen. He claimed that the large amount of money he deposited in his bank around the time of the alleged extortion was a gift from his dying father. On October 1, 1921, the Massachusetts Supreme Judicial Court found Tufts guilty of misconduct or breach of duty in the Barney, Mishawum Manor, and a number of other cases and removed him from office. He received notice of the court's decision while refereeing a football game between Princeton and Swarthmore College. On June 19, 1922, he was disbarred.

== Later life ==
Following his disbarment, Tufts moved to New York City. In 1932, he entered the hotel business. At various times he managed the Hotel Taft, Hotel Victoria, and the George Washington Hotel. He retired in December 1951 and died on November 8, 1952, at his home in Pitman, New Jersey.

== See also ==
- 1915 Massachusetts legislature
- 1916 Massachusetts legislature
