= Andrew J. Waterman =

American lawyer

Andrew Jackson Waterman

Massachusetts Attorney General
- In office 1888–1891
- Governor: Oliver Ames; John Q. A. Brackett
- Preceded by: Edgar J. Sherman
- Succeeded by: Albert E. Pillsbury

District Attorney for the Western District
- In office November 15, 1880 – October 1, 1887

Registrar of Probate and Insolvency
- In office 1858 – April 21, 1881
- Succeeded by: Office eliminated

Registrar of Probate
- In office February 15, 1854 – 1858
- Preceded by: New office

Personal details
- Born: June 23, 1825 North Adams, Massachusetts, U.S.
- Died: October 4, 1900 (aged 75) Williamstown, Massachusetts, U.S.
- Party: Republican
- Spouse: Ellen Douglas
- Profession: Attorney.

Andrew Jackson Waterman (June 23, 1825 – October 4, 1900) was a lawyer and Attorney General of Massachusetts.

== Early life ==
Waterman was born to William and Sarah (Bucklin) Waterman in North Adams, Massachusetts on June 24, 1824.

Waterman was a delegate to the Republican National Convention of 1864.

Legal offices
Preceded by Edgar J. Sherman	Attorney General of Massachusetts; 1888 - 1891	Succeeded by Albert E. Pillsbury
