= Henry Converse Atwill =

American politician (1872–1936)

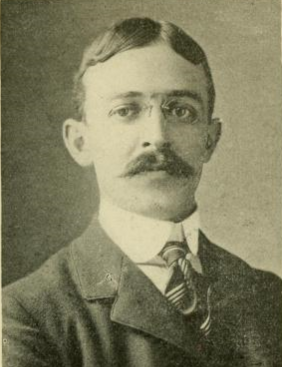

Massachusetts Attorney General
- In office 1915–1919
- Governor: David I. Walsh; Samuel W. McCall
- Preceded by: Thomas J. Boynton
- Succeeded by: J. Weston Allen

District Attorney of Essex County, Massachusetts
- In office 1911–1915
- Preceded by: W. Scott Peters
- Succeeded by: Michael A. Sullivan

Chair of the Massachusetts Department of Public Utilities
- In office 1919–1936
- Preceded by: Position created
- Succeeded by: John J. Murray

Personal details
- Born: March 11, 1872 Lynn, Massachusetts
- Died: November 1, 1936 (aged 64) Boston, Massachusetts
- Party: Republican
- Education: Boston University School of Law
- Profession: Lawyer

Henry Converse Atwill (1872–1936) was an American politician who served as Massachusetts Attorney General from 1915 to 1919. He was born in Lynn in 1872.

Atwill served in the Massachusetts House of Representatives from 1896 to 1898 and the Massachusetts Senate from 1899 to 1901. From 1905 to 1910 he was an Assistant District Attorney in Essex County, Massachusetts. When District Attorney W. Scott Peters retired, Atwill was elected to succeed him. As Essex County DA, Atwill oversaw the prosecution of Joseph James Ettor, Arturo Giovannitti, and Joseph Caruso for the murder of Anna Lopizzo during the 1912 Lawrence Textile Strike.

Atwill was elected Attorney General in 1914. He resigned in 1919 and Henry A. Wyman completed his term. He died November 1, 1936.

Party political offices
Preceded by James M. Swift	Republican nominee for Attorney General of Massachusetts; 1914, 1915, 1916, 1917, 1918	Succeeded by J. Weston Allen
Legal offices
Preceded by Thomas J. Boynton	Attorney General of Massachusetts; 1915 - 1919	Succeeded by J. Weston Allen
