= James Chambers (mayor) =

American politician (1864–1934)

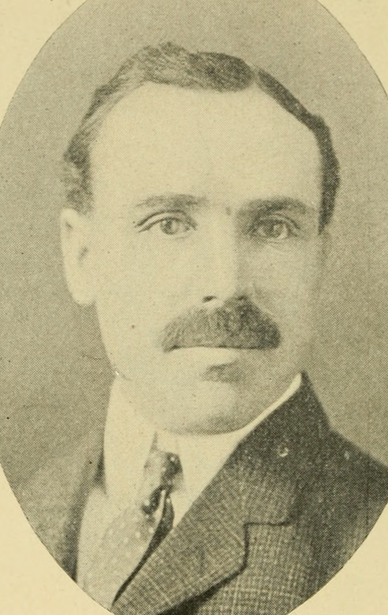
- Chambers as a member of the Massachusetts House of Representatives

Mayor of Everett, Massachusetts
- In office 1912–1917
- Preceded by: Herbert P. Wasgatt
- Succeeded by: John J. Mullen

Member of the Massachusetts House of Representatives from the 24th Middlesex District
- In office 1907–1908
- Preceded by: Wilmot R. Evans Jr.
- Succeeded by: Charles W. Atkins

Personal details
- Born: December 8, 1864 Kilkeel, Ireland
- Died: June 19, 1934 (aged 69) Everett, Massachusetts, U.S.
- Party: Republican

James Chambers (December 8, 1864 – June 19, 1934) was an Irish-born American politician who was mayor of Everett, Massachusetts from 1912 to 1917.

== Early life and business career ==
Chambers was born on December 8, 1864, in Kilkeel, County Down, Ireland. During his youth, he was educated in the National Schools and studied shoemaking under his father. He wanted to become a schoolmaster and attended private school for a year. He then followed his father's wishes and went to work. He moved to Barrow-in-Furness, where an uncle had promised him an opportunity to study to become a stationary engineer. The opportunity never materialized, and, after spending five months as a handyman in a machine shop, Chambers returned to Ireland, where he spent four years as a fisherman and sailor. In 1886, he immigrated to the United States and held a number of jobs in labor, including carpenter's helper, hod carrier, cellar digger, and chemical factory worker. He also studied acting at the Boston Museum, but abandoned the theater

after marrying in order to provide for his wife. He found steady work at a Boston brass foundry, where he rose from day laborer to superintendent. In 1905, he started his own metal brokerage business.

== Politics ==
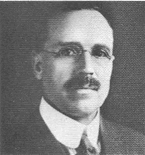
Chambers as mayor

Chambers moved to Everett, Massachusetts in 1894. He spent four years on the city's common council (including one year as president) and two years on the board of aldermen. Chambers represented the 24th Middlesex district in the Massachusetts House of Representatives during the 1907 and 1908 Massachusetts legislatures.

In 1911, Chambers was elected mayor over Board of Aldermen chairman Thomas J. Huey by 631 votes. He ran unopposed in 1912 and in 1913, beat James M. Tuohy by 619 votes despite not campaigning for reelection. In 1914, he won a four-way contest, receiving 922 more votes than his nearest opponent, Tuohy. In 1915, he was challenged by John J. Mullen, whom he had accused of "trying the spend the city's money like a drunken sailor" after he proposed several orders that would've increased public expenditure. Chambers won by 700 votes. He did not run for reelection in 1916.

== Later life and death ==
Chambers spent his later years working as a coal dealer. He died on June 19, 1934, at Whidden Memorial Hospital from heart disease.
