= Arthur Kenneth Reading =

American politician (1887-1971)

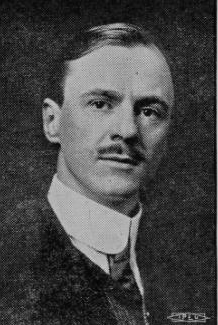
- Reading, circa 1927

27th Attorney General of the Commonwealth of Massachusetts
- In office 1927 – June 6, 1928
- Governor: Alvan T. Fuller
- Preceded by: Jay R. Benton
- Succeeded by: Joseph E. Warner

Middlesex County District Attorney
- In office 1923–1926
- Preceded by: Endicott Peabody Saltonstall
- Succeeded by: Robert T. Bushnell

Member of the Massachusetts House of Representatives 3rd Middlesex District
- In office 1919–1922

Personal details
- Born: March 9, 1887 Williamsport, Pennsylvania, US
- Died: March 1, 1971 (aged 83) Orlando, Florida, US
- Party: Republican Party
- Education: Harvard Law School
- Profession: Lawyer

Arthur Kenneth Reading (March 9, 1887 – March 1, 1971) was an American politician who served as Massachusetts Attorney General from 1927 to 1928.

== Biography ==
Reading was born on March 9, 1887, in Williamsport, Pennsylvania.

Reading was a member of the Massachusetts House of Representatives from 1919 to 1922, he was the District Attorney of Middlesex County, Massachusetts, from 1923 to 1926 before being elected Attorney General in 1926.

Reading resigned as Attorney General on June 6, 1928, after the Massachusetts House of Representatives voted 196 to 18 to impeach him after he accepted $60,000 worth of bribes, the largest being a $25,000 bribe from Decimo Club, Inc.

After leaving office, Reading returned to private practice. In his first case following impeachment, Reading secured the acquittal of former hockey star Raymie Skilton, who was charged with larceny of $10,000 from the Framingham National Bank.

He died on March 1, 1971, in Orlando, Florida.

Party political offices
Preceded by Jay R. Benton	Republican nominee for Attorney General of Massachusetts; 1926	Succeeded by Joseph E. Warner
