= Herbert P. Wasgatt =

American politician and shoe manufacturer (1865–1934)

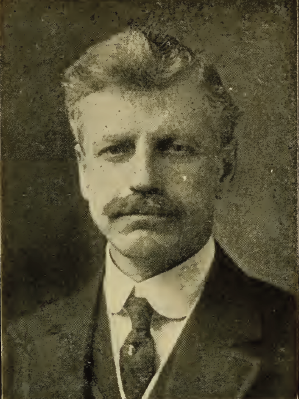

Member of the Massachusetts Executive Council 4th Councilor district
- In office 1915–1917
- Succeeded by: George Butler Wason

Member of the School Committee of the city of Everett, Massachusetts
- In office 1912–1914

11th Mayor of Everett, Massachusetts
- In office January 2, 1911 – January 2, 1912
- Preceded by: Charles Bruce
- Succeeded by: James Chambers

Member of the Board of Aldermen of the city of Everett, Massachusetts
- In office 1908–1909

Personal details
- Born: August 26, 1865 Boston, Massachusetts, U.S.
- Died: December 21, 1934 (aged 69) Boston, Massachusetts, U.S.
- Party: Republican
- Occupation: Shoe manufacturer Government official

Herbert P. Wasgatt (August 26, 1865 – December 21, 1934) was an American shoe manufacturer and politician who was the eleventh mayor of Everett, Massachusetts, and a member of the Massachusetts Governor's Council.

== Early life ==
Wasgatt was born on August 26, 1865, in Boston.

== Business career ==
In 1884, Wasgatt began manufacturing shoes. In 1892, he organized the Andrews-Wasgatt Company with Elmore Andrews. Five years later, they moved their factory to Everett.

== Political career ==
From 1908 to 1909, Wasgatt was a member of the Everett Board of Aldermen. From January 2, 1911, to January 2, 1912, he was the city's mayor. From 1912 to 1917, he was a member of the Everett School Committee.

From 1915 to 1917, he represented the 4th District on the Massachusetts Governor's Council.

Wasgatt was later a member of the State Board of Conciliation and Arbitration and Associate Commissioner of Labor and Industries.

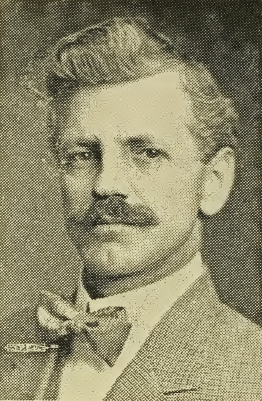
Herbert P. Wasgatt in 1915

== Death ==
Wasgatt died on December 21, 1934, in Boston. At the time of his death he was a resident of Newton, Massachusetts.

Political offices
Preceded by Charles Bruce	11th Mayor of Everett, Massachusetts; January 2, 1911–January 2, 1912	Succeeded by James Chambers
Preceded by	Member of the Massachusetts Executive Council; 4th Councilor district 1915–1917	Succeeded by George Butler Wason
