= Dana Malone =

American politician

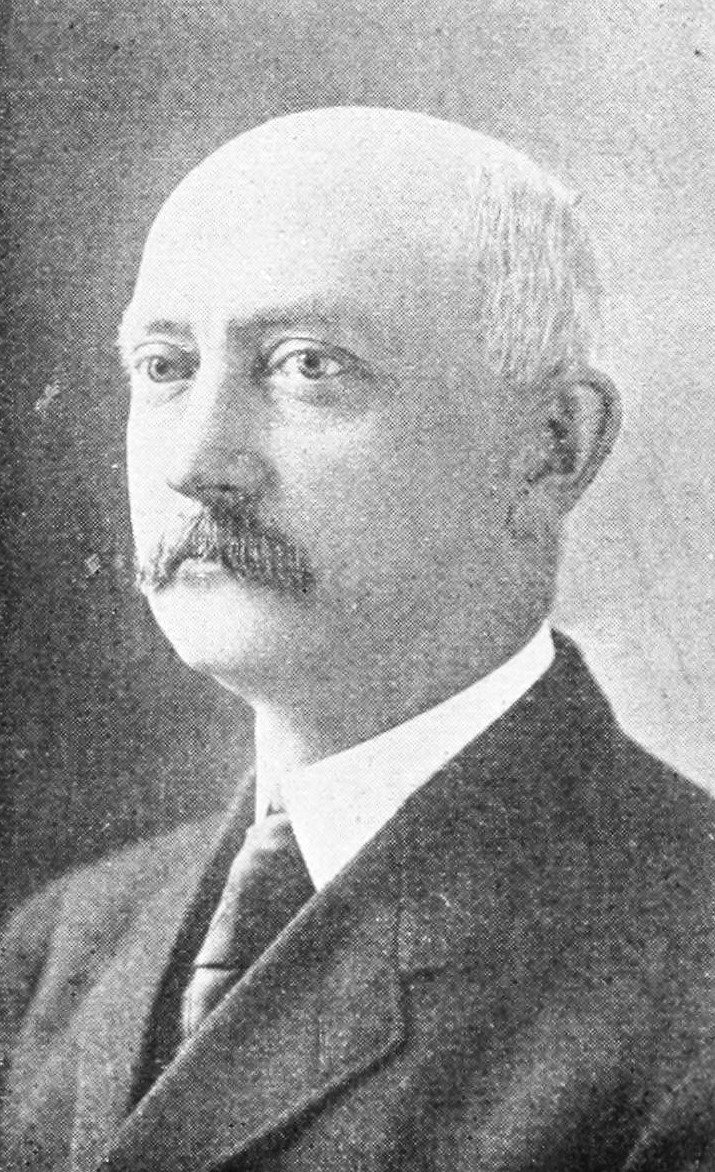

Massachusetts Attorney General
- In office 1906–1911
- Governor: Curtis Guild Jr. Eben Sumner Draper
- Preceded by: Herbert Parker
- Succeeded by: James M. Swift

Personal details
- Born: October 8, 1857 Arcade, New York
- Died: August 14, 1917 (aged 59) Greenfield, Massachusetts
- Party: Republican
- Profession: Lawyer; Politician

Dana Malone (October 8, 1857 – August 14, 1917) was an American politician who served as a member of the Massachusetts House of Representatives from 1893 to 1894 and a member of the Massachusetts Senate from 1895 to 1896, District Attorney for the Northwest District from 1901 to 1905, and Massachusetts Attorney General from 1906 to 1911.

As district attorney, Malone was responsible for the prosecution of Euclid Madden, a motorman who upset the carriage of President Theodore Roosevelt and caused the death of William Craig, the first United States Secret Service agent to die in the line of duty.

Malone died on August 14, 1917, in Greenfield, Massachusetts, after being thrown from a horse and fracturing his skull.

Legal offices
Preceded by Herbert Parker	Attorney General of Massachusetts; 1906 - 1911	Succeeded by James M. Swift
