= Charles L. Burrill =

American banker and politician (1862-1931)

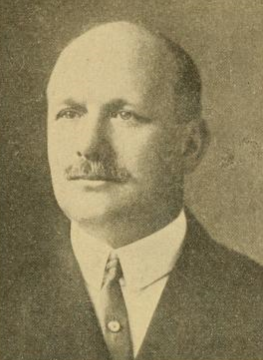

Treasurer and Receiver-General of Massachusetts
- In office 1915–1920
- Governor: David I. Walsh; Samuel W. McCall; Calvin Coolidge
- Preceded by: Frederick Mansfield
- Succeeded by: Fred J. Burrell

Member of the Massachusetts Executive Council from the 4th Councilor district
- In office 1923–1926
- Preceded by: William H. Dolben
- Succeeded by: James F. Powers

Member of the Boston School Committee
- In office 1897–1900

Personal details
- Born: Charles Lawrence Burrill; January 3, 1862 Boston, Massachusetts, U.S.
- Died: September 15, 1931 (aged 69) Boston, Massachusetts, U.S.
- Party: Republican
- Profession: Banker

Charles Lawrence Burrill (January 3, 1862 – September 15, 1931) was an American banker and politician who served as the Treasurer and Receiver-General of Massachusetts from 1915 to 1920.

A banker by trade, Burrill worked for the Adams Trust Company, the American Loan & Trust Co. and the Manufacturers Commercial Co. He also served as the President of the Boston Bank Officers' Association.

Burrill's political career began on the Boston School Committee, where he was a member from 1897 to 1900. In 1913 he was a candidate for Treasurer and Receiver-General of Massachusetts, but lost to Frederick Mansfield. Burrill went on to defeat Mansfield in a rematch the following year. Burrill remained Treasurer until 1920 when he sought the office of Lieutenant Governor of Massachusetts instead of running for re-election.

From 1922 to 1925, Burrill was a member of the Massachusetts Governor's Council. He was an unsuccessful candidate for Mayor of Boston in 1925, Lieutenant Governor of Massachusetts in 1928, and Treasurer and Receiver-General of Massachusetts in 1930.

Burrill died on September 15, 1931, in Boston, Massachusetts.

Party political offices
Preceded by Elmer A. Stevens	Republican nominee for Treasurer and Receiver-General of Massachusetts; 1913, 1914, 1915, 1916, 1917, 1918	Succeeded by Fred J. Burrell
Political offices
Preceded by Frederick Mansfield	Treasurer and Receiver-General of Massachusetts; 1915–1920	Succeeded by Fred J. Burrell
Preceded by William H. Dolben	Member of the Massachusetts Executive Council; 4th Councilor district 1923-1926	Succeeded by James F. Powers
