= William E. Weeks =

American politician (1880–1972)

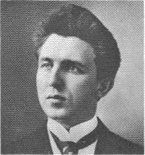

Mayor of Everett, Massachusetts
- In office 1919–1920
- Preceded by: John J. Mullen
- Succeeded by: Christopher Harrison

Member of the Massachusetts House of Representatives
- In office 1905–1909

Personal details
- Born: June 23, 1880 Portland, Maine
- Died: April 23, 1972 (aged 91)
- Party: Republican; Progressive Party (1922 election)
- Relations: Ranny Weeks (son)
- Education: Boston University School of Law
- Occupation: Attorney, politician

William Edward Weeks (June 23, 1880 – April 23, 1972) was an American attorney and politician who served as a member of the Massachusetts House of Representatives and as Mayor of Everett, Massachusetts.

== Early life ==
Weeks was born on June 23, 1880, in Portland, Maine. He attended public schools in Everett and in 1905 he graduated from Boston University and Boston University School of Law.

== Political career ==
In 1904, Weeks served as the private secretary to Everett mayor Thomas J. Boynton. From 1905 to 1909 he was a member of the Massachusetts House of Representatives. He was chairman of the House legal affairs committee in 1907 and the street railway committee in 1908 and 1909.

In 1917, Weeks defeated incumbent John J. Mullen by 230 votes to become Mayor of Everett. The Boston Daily Globe described the race between Mullen and Weeks as "one of the bitterest campaigns in years" and in his inaugural address, Weeks referred to his predecessor as a "caterwauling demagogue" and vowed to overturn many of his acts, including firing of Police Chief William E. Hill and the closure of the Everett Tuberculous Hospital. In 1918, Christopher Harrison defeated Weeks by 390 votes, with Mullen, who supported Harrison after being eliminated in the preliminary election, taking credit for "putting [him] over".

In 1922, Weeks was the Progressive Party candidate for United States Senate. He finished sixth with less than 1% of the vote. In 1923 Weeks moved to Reading, Massachusetts. However, in 1933, he returned to Everett to run for Mayor. He made the runoff election, but was defeated by another former Mayor, James A. Roche. During the 1934 gubenatoral election Weeks supported Democrat James Michael Curley. In 1935 Curley appointed Weeks to the State Alcoholic Beverage Control Commission. In 1941, Weeks again ran for Mayor of Everett. He finished last in a four candidate primary.

== Legal career ==
In 1922, Weeks defended George H. Mansfield, a former Everett resident who was charged with murdering his lover, Alice Jones. The medical examiner later ruled that Jones committed suicide and District Attorney Thomas C. O'Brien asked the grand jury to return no bill against Mansfield. In 1924, Weeks served as a special counsel for defendants accused of being part of an extortion ring led by former Middlesex County district attorney William J. Corcoran. They were found guilty and Corcoran was sentenced to 7 to 10 years in prison. Weeks also defended Corcoran when he and Daniel H. Coakley were also charged with conspiracy to extort later that year. They were found not guilty on all counts. In 1927 Weeks represented Jerry Gedzium, a convicted murder who was appealing his death sentence. The conviction was upheld by the Massachusetts Supreme Judicial Court, and Gedzium was executed in Massachusetts on February 29, 1928.

== See also ==
- 1916 Massachusetts legislature
