= James R. Plunkett =

American politician

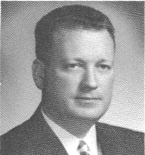

Mayor of Everett, Massachusetts
- In office 1966–1968
- Preceded by: Philip J. Crowley
- Succeeded by: George R. McCarthy

Personal details
- Occupation: Nursing home owner/administrator

James R. Plunkett is an American politician who served as Mayor of Everett, Massachusetts from 1966 to 1968.

Plunkett began his political career as a member of the Everett Common Council, where he served two terms. In 1961 he was elected to the Everett Board of Aldermen as an at-large member.

In 1965, Plunkett ran for Mayor. He defeated fellow Alderman George R. McCarthy 9858 votes to 9405. He was sworn into office on January 3, 1966. In his inaugural speech he stated that Everett would become "a city on the move" and proposed commercial development on the city's waterfront. He was defeated by McCarthy in 1967 by 1200 votes. He ran again in 1969, losing to McCarthy 9586 to 7160.

Outside politics Plunkett served as a member of the United States Marine Corps during the Korean War and was the owner and administrator of an Everett nursing home.
