= Joseph E. Warner (Massachusetts politician) =

American politician (1884-1958)

Joseph Everett Warner
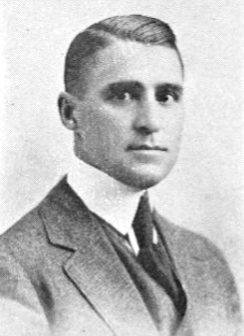
- Warner, circa 1920

Justice of the Massachusetts Superior Court
- In office October 14, 1940 – May 30, 1958
- Appointed by: Leverett Saltonstall
- Preceded by: Franklin T. Hammond
- Succeeded by: Edward Gourdin

28th Attorney General of the Commonwealth of Massachusetts
- In office 1928–1935
- Governor: Alvan T. Fuller; Frank G. Allen; Joseph B. Ely
- Preceded by: Arthur K. Reading
- Succeeded by: Paul A. Dever

Speaker of the Massachusetts House of Representatives
- In office 1919–1920
- Preceded by: Channing H. Cox
- Succeeded by: Benjamin Loring Young

Member of the Massachusetts House of Representatives 4th Bristol District
- In office 1913–1920

Member of the Taunton, Massachusetts City Council
- In office 1907–1911

Personal details
- Born: May 16, 1884 Taunton, Massachusetts, U.S.
- Died: May 30, 1958 (aged 74) Taunton, Massachusetts, U.S.
- Party: Republican
- Education: Harvard College, Harvard Law School
- Profession: Attorney

Joseph Everett Warner (May 16, 1884 – May 30, 1958) was a U.S. politician who served as the Speaker of the Massachusetts House of Representatives from 1919 to 1920, as the Attorney General of Massachusetts from 1928 to 1935, and as a Justice of the Massachusetts Superior Court from 1940 until his death in 1958.

Warner was born in Taunton, Massachusetts, on May 16, 1884, to Richard Everett Warner and Ida Evelyn (Briggs) Warner. Warner graduated from Harvard College and Harvard Law School.

After graduating from college, Warner was elected to the Taunton city council. He was elected to the Massachusetts House of Representatives in 1912. He served as chairman of the ways and means committee from 1916 to 1918 and speaker of the House from 1919 to 1920. Warner was a delegate to the 1920 Republican National Convention.

In 1923, Warner was appointed assistant attorney general by Massachusetts Attorney General Arthur K. Reading. He was appointed attorney general when Reading resigned in 1928 and remained in office until his retirement in 1935. He then conducted private practice in Boston until 1940, when Governor Leverett Saltonstall appointed Warner to be a Justice of the Massachusetts Superior Court.

Warner died in his home of a heart attack on May 30, 1958.

== See also ==
- 1915 Massachusetts legislature
- 1916 Massachusetts legislature
- 1917 Massachusetts legislature
- 1918 Massachusetts legislature
- 1919 Massachusetts legislature
- 1920 Massachusetts legislature

Party political offices
Preceded by Arthur Kenneth Reading	Republican nominee for Attorney General of Massachusetts; 1928, 1930, 1932, 1934	Succeeded by Felix Forte
Massachusetts House of Representatives
Preceded by Channing H. Cox	Speaker of the Massachusetts House of Representatives; 1919 — 1920	Succeeded by Benjamin Loring Young
Political offices
Preceded by Arthur K. Reading	Attorney General of the Commonwealth of Massachusetts; 1928 - 1935	Succeeded by Paul A. Dever
Legal offices
Preceded by	Justice of the Massachusetts Superior Court; 1940 – May 30, 1958	Succeeded by
