= Jay R. Benton =

American lawyer, businessman, and politician (1885-1953)

Jay Rogers Benton
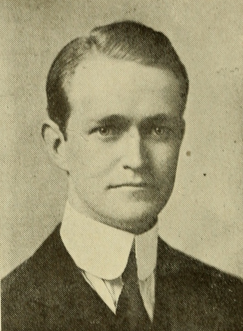

26th Attorney General of the Commonwealth of Massachusetts
- In office 1923–1927
- Governor: Channing H. Cox; Alvan T. Fuller
- Preceded by: J. Weston Allen
- Succeeded by: Arthur K. Reading

Member of the Massachusetts House of Representatives 28th Middlesex District
- In office 1917–1918

Personal details
- Born: October 18, 1885 Somerville, Massachusetts
- Died: November 4, 1953 (aged 68) Belmont, Massachusetts
- Party: Republican
- Spouse: Frances Hill (1894-1982)
- Education: Phillips Exeter Academy; Harvard University; Boston University Law School
- Profession: Lawyer, Publisher, Businessman

Jay Rogers Benton (October 18, 1885 – November 4, 1953) was an American lawyer, businessman, and politician who served as Massachusetts Attorney General from 1923 to 1927. He was born in Somerville in 1885.

The son of Republican politician Everett Chamberlin Benton, Benton worked as a banker, newspaper publisher, and lawyer before pursuing a career in politics. Benton was elected to the Massachusetts House of Representatives in 1917, but resigned the following year to become Assistant Attorney General of Massachusetts. When Attorney General J. Weston Allen decided not to run for reelection in 1922, Benton was elected to succeed him.

After leaving office, Benton joined the firm of Sherburne, Powers & Needham. From 1937 until his death in 1953, Benton was president of the Boston Mutual Life Insurance Company. He died in Belmont, Massachusetts in 1953.

Party political offices
Preceded by J. Weston Allen	Republican nominee for Attorney General of Massachusetts; 1922, 1924	Succeeded by Arthur Kenneth Reading
