= Melvin O. Adams =

American attorney and businessman

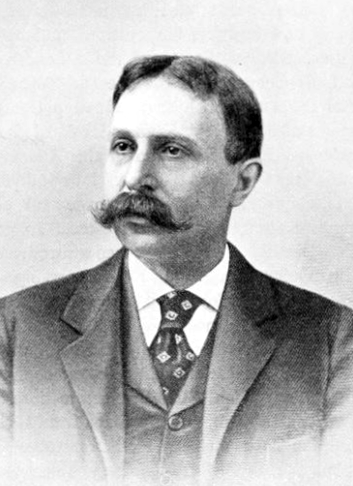

United States Attorney for the District of Massachusetts
- In office 1905–1906
- Preceded by: Henry P. Moulton
- Succeeded by: Asa P. French

Personal details
- Born: November 7, 1850 Ashburnham, Massachusetts
- Died: August 9, 1920 (aged 69) Boston, Massachusetts
- Resting place: Meetinghouse Hill Cemetery; Ashburnham, Massachusetts
- Party: Republican
- Spouse: Mary Colony
- Education: Dartmouth College
- Occupation: Attorney; Railroad executive Military officer

Melvin Ohio Adams (November 7, 1850 – August 9, 1920) was an American attorney and railroad executive who was part of Lizzie Borden's legal defense team, the United States Attorney for the District of Massachusetts from 1905 to 1906, and the president of the Boston, Revere Beach and Lynn Railroad.

== Early life ==
Adams was born in Ashburnham, Massachusetts on November 7, 1850, to Joseph Adams and Dolly Winship (Whitney) Adams. He attended school in his native Ashburnham, Massachusetts as well as the Appleton Academy in New Ipswich, New Hampshire. In 1871, he graduated from Dartmouth College. After graduation worked as a teacher in Fitchburg, Massachusetts, and studied law in the office of Amasa Norcross. On January 20, 1874, he married Mary Colony of Fitchburg. From 1874 to 1876, he served as Ashburnham's Town Moderator.

== Legal and military career ==
In 1875, Adams graduated from the Boston University School of Law. He was admitted to the bar that year and was soon thereafter became an assistant district attorney for Suffolk County, Massachusetts. In 1886, Adams resigned his position to go into private practice with Augustus Russ. Adams and Russ remained partners until Russ' death in the summer of 1892.

In 1892, Adams was retained by Andrew V. Jennings to serve as the associate defense counsel for Lizzie Borden, a Fall River, Massachusetts woman accused of killing her father and stepmother with a hatchet. After a much-publicized trial, Borden was acquitted on June 20, 1893.

An active member of the Massachusetts Republican Party, Adams served on the staff of Governor John Q. A. Brackett as assistant adjutant general with the rank of colonel.

In 1905, Adams was appointed by President Theodore Roosevelt to serve as the United States Attorney for the District of Massachusetts. He remained a U.S. Attorney until his resignation on December 5, 1906.

== Business career ==
In 1890, Adams joined the Boston, Revere Beach and Lynn Railroad as a director and general counsel. From 1891 until his death in 1920 he was the railroad's president.

Adams was also the vice-president of the Liberty Trust Company.

== Trustee ==
Adams served on the Board of Trustees of Dartmouth College and the Perkins School for the Blind. He was instrumental in securing the funds necessary to rebuild Dartmouth Hall.

== Death ==
Adams died on August 9, 1920, at his home in Boston. He was buried in the Meetinghouse Hill Cemetery in Ashburnham.

== See also ==
- List of railroad executives
