= John J. Higgins =

American attorney and politician (1865–1944)

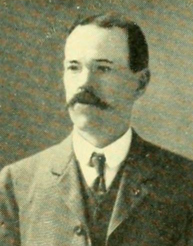

District Attorney of Middlesex County, Massachusetts
- In office 1908–1913
- Preceded by: Hugh Bancroft
- Succeeded by: William J. Corcoran

Member of the Massachusetts House of Representatives for the 25th Middlesex District
- In office 1906–1907

Personal details
- Born: May 17, 1865 Boston, Massachusetts, U.S.
- Died: January 25, 1944 (aged 78) Mount Dora, Florida, U.S.
- Resting place: Oak Grove Cemetery; Melrose, Massachusetts
- Party: Republican
- Education: Harvard Law School
- Occupation: Lawyer

John J. Higgins (May 17, 1865 – January 25, 1944) was an American politician who was a member of the Massachusetts House of Representatives from 1906 to 1907 and district attorney of Middlesex County, Massachusetts from 1908 to 1913.

== Early life ==
Higgins was born on May 17, 1865, in Boston. He prepared for college at Phillips Exeter Academy and graduated from Harvard Law School in 1890.

== Politics ==
Higgins was president of the Ward 3 Republican Club in Somerville, Massachusetts. He was a member of the city's board of aldermen from 1903 to 1905 and was president of the body in 1905. From 1906 to 1907 he represented the 25th Middlesex District in the Massachusetts House of Representatives.

In 1907, Higgins ran for Middlesex County district attorney. He faced Arnold Scott, Nelson P. Brown, Melvin M. Johnson, and James G. Hill for the Republican nomination. At the Republican county convention, the delegates deadlocked and adjourned after 18 hours. The following day, Higgins won the nomination on the 24th ballot.

In 1909, Higgins and his assistants secured the conviction of Chester S. Jordan, a vaudeville performer and the brother-in-law of Jesse Livermore, for the murder of his wife. Following the conviction, doubt was raised over the sanity of juror Willis A. White. The case was appealed all the way to the United States Supreme Court, which ruled on May 27, 1912, that "White was of sufficient mental capacity during the entire trial of Chester S. Jordan until after the verdict was returned, to intelligently consider the evidence, appreciate the arguments of counsel, the rulings of law, the charge of the court, and to arrive at a rational conclusion". Jordan was executed on September 24, 1912.

In 1909, Higgins office prosecuted Hattie Le Blanc, a 16-year-old Acadian maid from West Arichat, Nova Scotia, for the murder of her employer, Clarence F. Glover. Le Blanc was found not guilty.

In 1913, Higgins was upset in his bid for reelection by Democrat William J. Corcoran, who won a three-way contest that also included Progressive candidate Philip M. Clark.

== Death ==
In January 1944, Higgins visited Mount Dora, Florida to recuperate from pneumonia and an operation. He died on January 25, 1944, at Mount Dora Hospital at the age of 79.
