= Charles Bruce (mayor) =

American politician (1862–1937)

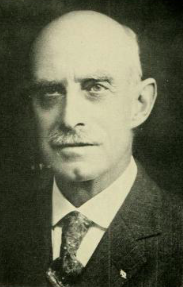
- Bruce as a member of the Massachusetts House of Representatives

Member of the Massachusetts House of Representatives from the 20th Middlesex District
- In office 1931–1932
- Preceded by: Joseph L. Larson
- Succeeded by: Joseph L. Larson

Mayor of Everett, Massachusetts
- In office 1908–1911
- Preceded by: Thomas J. Boynton
- Succeeded by: Herbert P. Wasgatt
- In office 1902–1904
- Preceded by: Charles C. Nichols
- Succeeded by: Thomas J. Boynton

Personal details
- Born: June 23, 1862 Shelburne, Nova Scotia, Canada
- Died: October 6, 1937 (aged 75) Everett, Massachusetts, U.S.
- Party: Republican

Charles Bruce (June 23, 1862 – October 6, 1937) was a Canadian-born American politician who was mayor of Everett, Massachusetts from 1902 to 1904 and 1908 to 1911 and a member of the Massachusetts House of Representatives from 1931 to 1932.

== Early life and professional career ==
Bruce was born on June 23, 1862, in Shelburne, Nova Scotia, Canada. He was educated at the Shelburne Academy. He worked in real estate, serving as a managing director of the Edward Harrington Company of Boston and chairman of the brokerage committee of the Massachusetts Real Estate Exchange.

== Politics ==
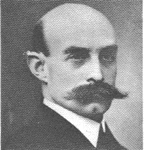
Bruce as mayor

Bruce was first elected to public office in 1895 when he was voted to Everett's common council. He was later elected to the board of aldermen and served as that body's president in 1899 and 1900. He was urged to run for mayor in 1900, but chose not to enter the race.

In 1901, Bruce challenged incumbent mayor Charles C. Nichols for the Republican Party nomination. He won the caucus by 60 votes. He defeated Democrat William J. Brickley by a plurality of 1029 votes. In 1902, he was reelected over Democratic and citizen's candidate Thomas J. Boynton by a plurality of 195 votes. He did not run for reelection in 1903.

In 1905, Bruce returned to elected office as a member of the Everett school committee. In 1907, he was elected mayor by a plurality of 1059 votes over Isaac C. Harvey. He was unopposed in 1908 and defeated former mayor Arthur W. Hatch 2330 votes to 1298 in 1909. He did not run for reelection in 1910.

Bruce was a delegate to the Massachusetts Constitutional Convention of 1917–1918. In 1917, he was a Republican candidate for Massachusetts State Auditor. He lost the primary to incumbent Alonzo B. Cook 63,331 votes to 31,186. In 1923, he returned to the Everett school committee. He was elected its chairman in 1932 after 19 ballots.

Bruce represented the 20th Middlesex district in the Massachusetts House of Representatives in the 1931–1932 Massachusetts legislature. He was defeated for reelection by his predecessor, Joseph L. Larson.

Bruce died on October 6, 1937, at his home in Everett. At the time of his death, he was chairman of the city's board of assessors.
