= George Butler Wason =

American grocer, banker and politician (1869-1933)

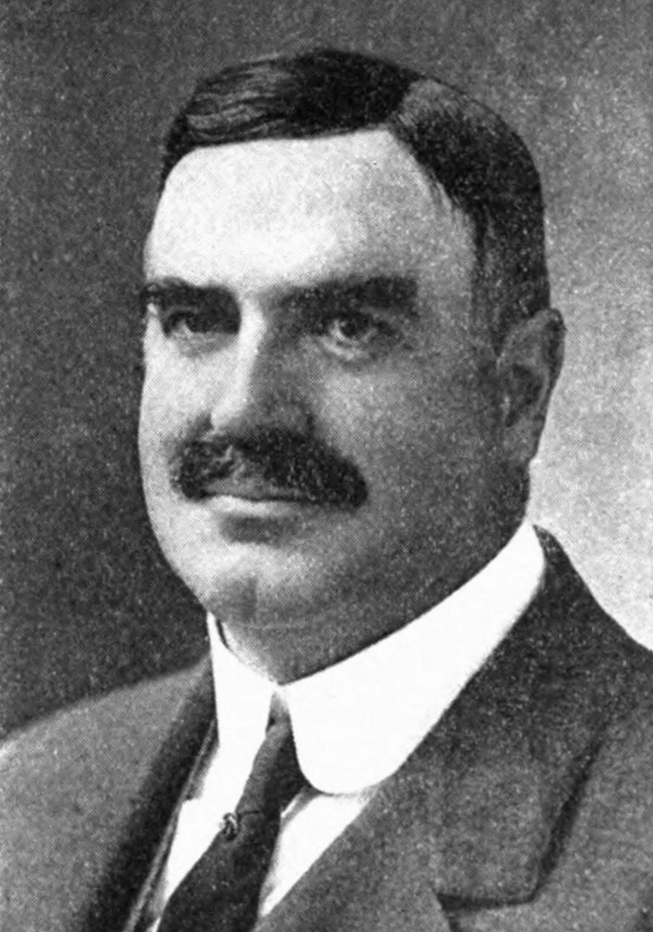

Member of the Massachusetts Executive Council 4th Councilor district
- In office 1918–1921
- Preceded by: Herbert P. Wasgatt
- Succeeded by: John C. F. Slayton

Personal details
- Born: April 20, 1869 New Boston, New Hampshire, U.S.
- Died: 1933
- Party: Republican
- Spouse(s): Lillian Maud Fletcher, m. April 20, 1896, in South Orange, New Jersey
- Education: Nashua High School
- Occupation: Grocer, Banker

George Butler Wason (April 20, 1869 – 1933) was an American grocer, banker and politician who served as a member of the Massachusetts Governor's Council.

== Early life ==
Wason was born in New Boston, New Hampshire. When he was fifteen Wason moved with his family to Nashua, New Hampshire. In 1889 Wason graduated from Nashua High School.

== Business ==
=== Grocery business ===
In July 1889 Wason went to work for the firm of Wason & Pierce Co. wholesale grocers, a firm that was co-owned by his uncle Robert B. Wason. Wason worked in the firm's various departments until 1896, at which time he became the representative of the firm in southern New Hampshire. After Mr. Pierce died in 1896, Wason became a principal of the firm. In 1906, after the death of his uncle, Wason became the head of the firm. The firm was incorporated as The Wason Company, of which Wason was the treasurer and general manager.

=== Banking career ===
When the Liberty Trust company was formed, Wason was elected president. He was also a trustee of the North Avenue Savings Bank.

Political offices
Preceded by Herbert P. Wasgatt	Member of the Massachusetts Executive Council; 4th Councilor district 1918-1921	Succeeded by John C. F. Slayton
