= Edgar J. Sherman =

American politician

Edgar Jay Sherman
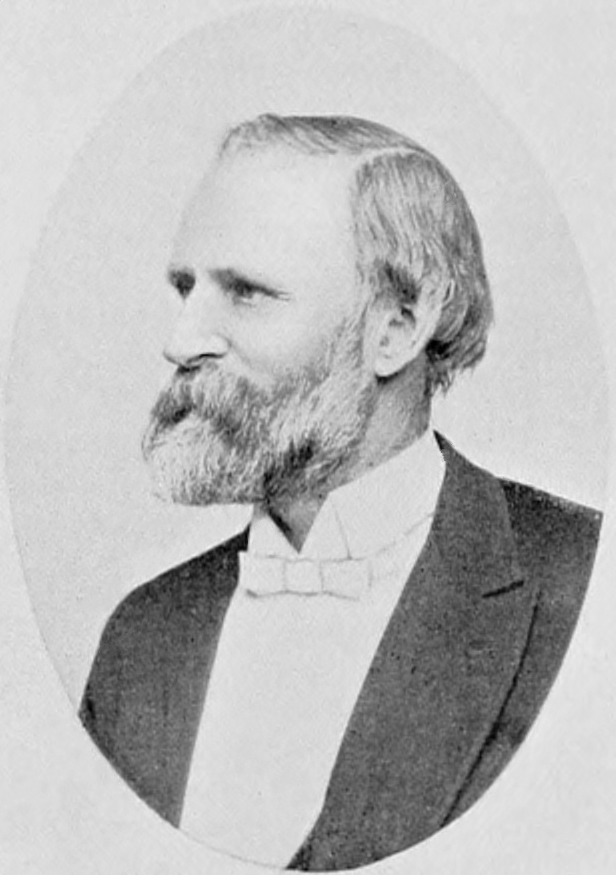

Associate Justice of the Massachusetts Superior Court
- In office 1887 – October 4, 1911
- Appointed by: Oliver Ames
- Preceded by: Marcus Perrin Knowlton
- Succeeded by: Richard W. Irwin

Massachusetts Attorney General
- In office 1883–1887
- Governor: Benjamin Butler; George D. Robinson
- Preceded by: George Marston
- Succeeded by: Andrew J. Waterman
- Majority: 22,555

District Attorney for Essex County, Massachusetts
- In office 1869–1883
- Preceded by: Alfred A. Abbott
- Succeeded by: Henry P. Moulton

Personal details
- Born: November 28, 1834 Weathersfield, Vermont, U.S.
- Died: June 9, 1914 (aged 79) Windsor, Vermont, U.S.
- Party: Republican
- Spouse(s): Abbie Louise Simmons, m. November 24, 1858; Virginia Bryant, m. February 1906.
- Profession: Lawyer

Military service
- Allegiance: United States of America; Union
- Branch/service: Union Army
- Years of service: 1862
- Rank: Private, Captain, Major
- Battles/wars: American Civil War: Battle of Port Hudson

Edgar Jay Sherman (November 28, 1834 – June 9, 1914) was an American attorney who served as District Attorney of the Eastern District of Massachusetts, as a member of the Massachusetts House of Representatives, Attorney General of Massachusetts and as an associate justice of the Massachusetts Superior Court.

== Early life ==
Sherman was born November 28, 1834, in Weathersfield, Vermont, to David and Fanny (Kendall) Sherman.

== Death ==
Sherman died June 9, 1914, in Windsor, Vermont.

Legal offices
Preceded by George Marston	Attorney General of Massachusetts; 1883–1887	Succeeded by Andrew J. Waterman
