= William H. Dolben =

American politician (1878-1948)

William Henry Dolben
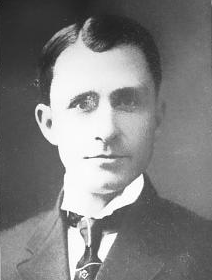

Member of the Massachusetts Executive Council 4th Councilor District
- In office January 24, 1922. – 1923
- Preceded by: John C. F. Slayton
- Succeeded by: Charles L. Burrill

Member of the Massachusetts House of Representatives 26th Middlesex District

Personal details
- Born: January 23, 1878 Boston, Massachusetts, U.S.
- Died: June 6, 1948 (aged 70)
- Party: Republican

William H. Dolben (January 23, 1878 – June 6, 1948) was an American politician who was in the Massachusetts House of Representatives, and the Massachusetts Executive Council.

== Massachusetts House of Representatives ==
Dolben represented the twenty sixth Middlesex District in the Massachusetts House of Representatives. In 1913 Dolben served on the Committee on Metropolitan Affairs, in 1914 he served on the Committee on Metropolitan Affairs and on the Committee on Federal Affairs.

== Massachusetts Executive Council ==
On January 23, 1922 Dolben was elected, by the Massachusetts General Court, to the Massachusetts Executive Council, replacing John C. F. Slayton who had died in office, Dolben was sworn in on January 24, 1922.

Dolben was from Somerville, Massachusetts.

Political offices
Preceded by John C. F. Slayton	Member of the Massachusetts Executive Council; 4th Councilor district January 22, 1924-January 1925	Succeeded by Charles L. Burrill
