= William J. Corcoran (attorney) =

American lawyer

District Attorney of Middlesex County, Massachusetts
- In office 1913–1917
- Preceded by: John J. Higgins
- Succeeded by: Nathan A. Tufts

Personal details
- Born: Stoneham, Massachusetts
- Party: Democratic
- Education: Boston University Law School
- Occupation: Lawyer

William J. Corcoran was an American lawyer who served as District Attorney of Middlesex County, Massachusetts from 1913 to 1917. He later faced a number of criminal indictments and was convicted of one count of extortion.

== Early life ==
Corcoran was born in Stoneham, Massachusetts. He graduated from Boston University Law School in 1903 and began practicing law the same year. In 1909 he moved from Stoneham to Cambridge, Massachusetts.

== District attorney ==
In 1913, Corcoran won in an upset to be District Attorney of Middlesex County. He received 32,676 votes to Republican incumbent John J. Higgins' 30,684, with Progressive candidate Philip M. Clark receiving 25,242.

== Legal problems ==
=== Extortion charges ===
==== Suffolk County ====
In June 1921, Massachusetts Attorney General J. Weston Allen accused Corcoran, Daniel H. Coakley, and others of conspiring with Middlesex County District Attorney Nathan A. Tufts to use the threat of criminal indictment to extort money from people. On September 29, 1921, the Boston Bar Association filed a petition for disbarment against Corcoran. On September 1, 1921, a former client, Scott Paul, sued Corcoran to recover a fair share of a $50,000 settlement he received. According to Paul, he only received $5,000 from Corcoran because Corcoran claimed the rest would barely cover expenses. Soon thereafter, the Boston Bar Association filed a petition for Corcoran's disbarment. Corcoran then moved to Port Chester, New York and attempted to resign from the Boston bar, but this request was refused and he was eventually disbarred. On December 27, 1921, Corcoran appeared in Suffolk County Superior Court and pled not guilty to charges of extortion and larceny. He was released on $10,000 bail. He agreed to turn over state's evidence in its case against Suffolk County District Attorney Joseph C. Pelletier, however he did not receive immunity and The Boston Globe reported that his motive was "an impulse of savage revenge" towards another lawyer.

Corcoran's trial was to begin on November 1, 1922, but he failed to appear in court. A default judgment against Corcoran was obtained on July 11, 1923. On July 25, 1923, Corcoran was arrested in the lobby of the Knickerbocker Building. At the time of his arrest, Corcoran was living in a room on 23rd Street and traveling frequently to avoid capture. He was held in The Tombs until his extradition to Massachusetts on July 31. His trial began on October 17. On November 9, Judge Joseph F. Quinn was seriously injured in a fall and could not continue to preside over the case. As a result, a mistrial was declared on November 19 and a second trial was scheduled for January 7. This trial too ended in a mistrial when a witness alleged that the jurors had been bribed. On May 20, 1924, Corcoran and Daniel H. Coakley were indicted on 11 charges of conspiracy to extort. They were found not guilty on July 3. His final trial in Suffolk County ended on January 9, 1925 when jurors were unable to come to an agreement on the guilt of Corcoran and Hartnett on a conspiracy to extort case.

==== Middlesex County ====
On February 5, 1924 Corcoran was indicted on blackmail charges in Middlesex County. On April 1 he was found guilty on one count of an indictment that charged him with extorting money from a married man in a Badger game. He was sentenced to 7 to 10 years in prison. He began his sentence on May 25, 1925 and was released on January 24, 1930.

=== Bond cases ===
On March 30, 1937, Corcoran was charged with violating the National Stolen Property Act by transporting $10,000 U.S. Treasury bond that had been stolen from a bank messenger in Louisville, Kentucky by a national bond theft gang. He was found not guilty on April 28.
