= Alonzo H. Evans =

American politician

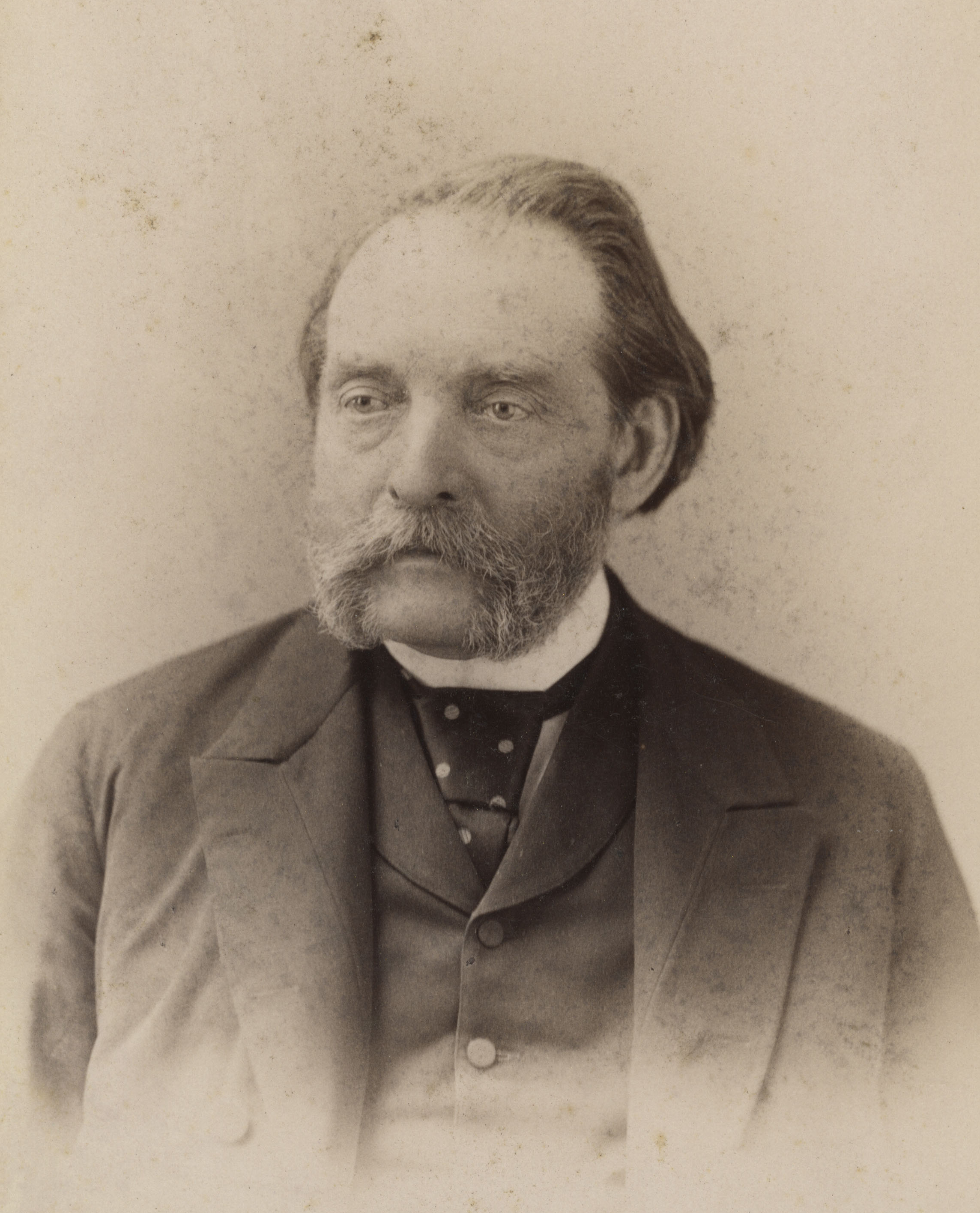

Mayor of Everett, Massachusetts
- In office 1893–1894
- Preceded by: First
- Succeeded by: Francis Batchelder

Personal details
- Born: February 24, 1820 Allenstown, New Hampshire
- Died: May 27, 1907 (aged 87) Everett, Massachusetts
- Party: Republican
- Occupation: Banker

Alonzo H. Evans (February 24, 1820 – May 27, 1907) was an American bank executive and politician who served in both branches of the Massachusetts General Court, and on the Massachusetts Governor's Council and was the first Mayor of Everett, Massachusetts.

== Early life ==
Evans was born on February 24, 1820, in Allenstown, New Hampshire. At the age of fifteen he moved to Lowell, Massachusetts, where he worked in a factory for one year. He then moved to Boston.

== Banking career ==
In 1854 he helped found the Boston Five Cent Savings Bank and was its first treasurer. When bank president Paul Adams retired in 1874, Evans succeeded him.

Evans also served as a director of the Winthrop National Bank.

== Political career ==
Evans was a leader in the movement to have Everett separate from Malden, Massachusetts. After Everett became separate, Evans was chosen to serve as its first Town Moderator. In 1874 and 1876, Evans represented Everett in the Massachusetts House of Representatives. In 1892 he was a member of the Massachusetts Governor's Council, representing the sixth district.

Evans was also active in the movement to establish a city government in Everett. The city charter was accepted in 1892. On November 21, 1892, the Town Committee acting on the petition of 506, held a general caucus to nominate candidates for the office of mayor. Evans and George E. Smith were chosen to run in the general election to be held on December 13. He defeated Smith 1,241 votes to 1,052 and was inaugurated on January 2, 1893.

In 1899 and 1900 he represented the Sixth Middlesex District in the Massachusetts Senate.

== Death ==
Evans died on May 27, 1907, at his home in Everett. His health had deteriorated after he suffered a fall the previous week.

== See also ==
- 1873 Massachusetts legislature
- 1876 Massachusetts legislature
- 1889 Massachusetts legislature
