= Sherman Hoar =

American lawyer and politician (1860–1898)

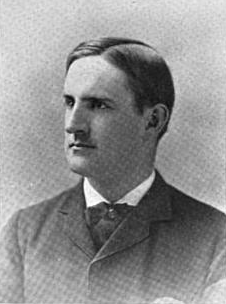

Member of the U.S. House of Representatives from Massachusetts's 5th district
- In office March 4, 1891 – March 3, 1893
- Preceded by: Nathaniel P. Banks
- Succeeded by: Moses T. Stevens

United States Attorney for the District of Massachusetts
- In office 1893–1897
- Preceded by: Frank D. Allen
- Succeeded by: Boyd B. Jones

Personal details
- Born: July 30, 1860 Concord, Massachusetts, U.S.
- Died: October 7, 1898 (aged 38) Concord, Massachusetts, U.S.
- Party: Democratic
- Education: Harvard University (BA, LLB)
- Profession: Attorney

Sherman Hoar (July 30, 1860 – October 7, 1898) was an American lawyer and politician who was a member of Congress representing Massachusetts, and U.S. District Attorney for Massachusetts. As a young man he was the model for the head of the John Harvard statue now in the Harvard Yard.

== Education and career ==
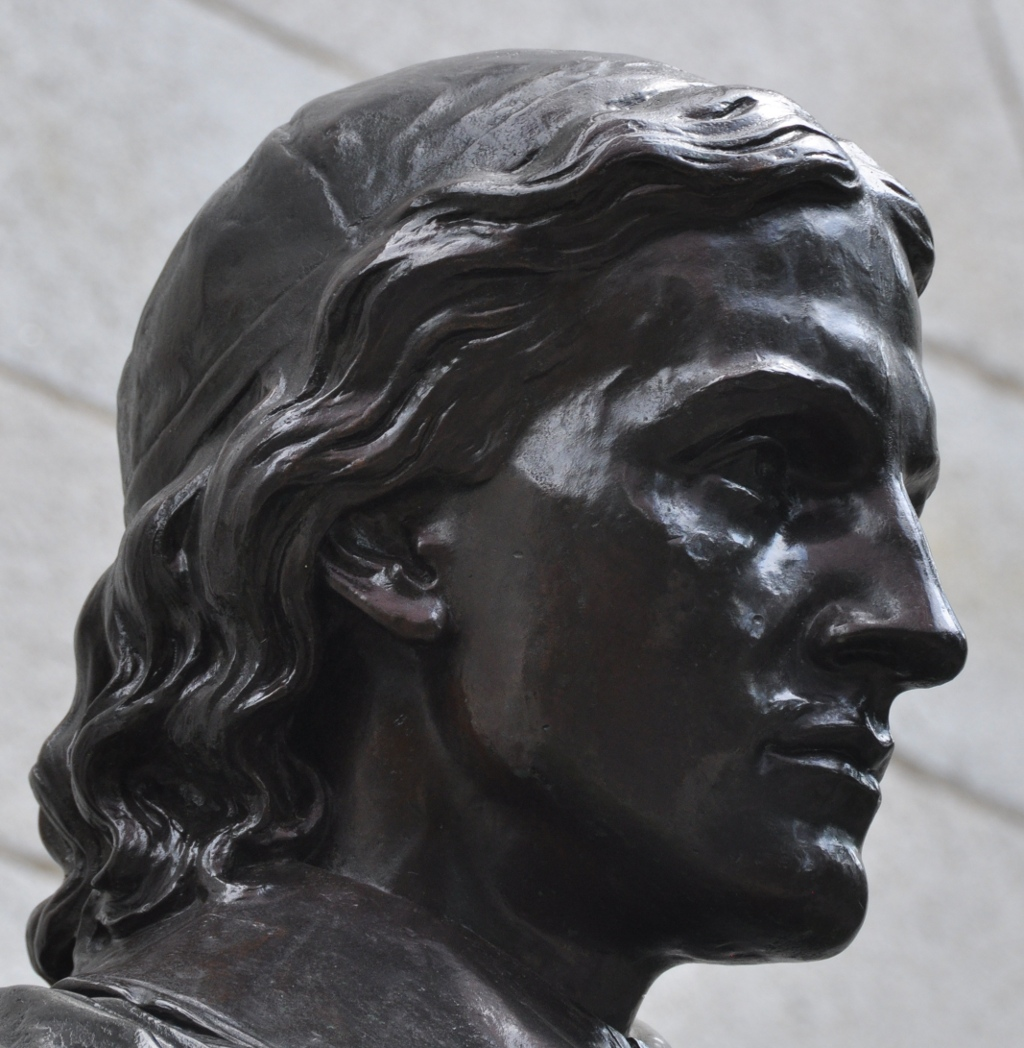
Hoar was the inspiration for the face of the John Harvard statue.

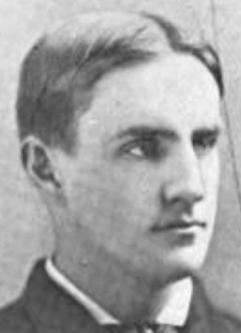
Hoar in his student days

Hoar graduated from Harvard College in 1882 and Harvard Law School in 1884. While at Harvard he sat as the model for the head of the John Harvard statue which now sits in Harvard Yard. In 1885 he was admitted to the bar of Middlesex County and commenced practicing law in Concord, Massachusetts.

Though from a prominent Republican family Hoar was a Mugwump, leading the Young Men's Democratic Club of Massachusetts during Grover Cleveland's 1884 campaign, and was a member of the House of Representatives in the Fifty-second U.S. Congress (1891–1893). He was U.S. Attorney for Massachusetts, 1893–1897.

Hoar was director of the Massachusetts Volunteer Aid Association during the Spanish–American War, and served in several US Army hospitals in the South. He was also a great believer in public education. He once said: "Our public school system is what makes this Nation superior to all other Nations—not the Army or the Navy system. Military display . . . does not belong here."

== Death ==
After an illness of three weeks, Sherman Hoar died at his home on Main street, Concord, of typhoid fever contracted while making a tour of the Southern camps as a General of the Massachusetts Volunteer Association.

== Family ==
Sherman Hoar came from a line of distinguished Massachusetts and New England politicians, lawyers and esteemed public servants. He was

- the great-grandson of Roger Sherman, a signer of both the Constitution and the Declaration of Independence;
- the grandson of Congressman Samuel Hoar;
- the son of U.S. Attorney General, Congressman and Massachusetts Supreme Judicial Court Justice Ebenezer Rockwood Hoar;
- the father of Massachusetts State Senator and Assistant Attorney General Roger Sherman Hoar;
- a nephew of U.S. Senator George Frisbie Hoar; and U.S. Representative George Merrick Brooks;
- the cousin to Massachusetts Congressman Rockwood Hoar.

U.S. House of Representatives
| Preceded by Nathaniel P. Banks | Member of the U.S. House of Representatives from Massachusetts's 5th congressional district March 4, 1891 – March 3, 1893 | Succeeded by Moses T. Stephens |
