= George Marston (Massachusetts politician) =

American politician

Massachusetts Attorney General
- In office January 1879 – January 1883
- Governor: Thomas Talbot; John Davis Long
- Preceded by: Charles R. Train
- Succeeded by: Edgar J. Sherman

District Attorney for the Southern District
- In office January 1860 – 1879

Judge of Probate of Barnstable County, Massachusetts
- In office 1855 – July 1, 1858

Registrar of Probate of Barnstable County, Massachusetts
- In office March 1853 – December 1854

Personal details
- Born: October 15, 1821 Barnstable, Massachusetts, U.S.
- Died: August 14, 1883 (aged 61) New Bedford, Massachusetts, U.S.
- Party: Republican
- Education: Harvard Law School
- Profession: Attorney

George Marston (October 15, 1821 – August 14, 1883), was an American lawyer who served in various political offices, including as the Attorney General of Massachusetts.

== Early life ==
Marston was born to Charles Marston in Barnstable, Massachusetts on October 15, 1821.

== Elected offices ==
In 1850 Marston was elected the District Attorney for the Southern District, he also served as the Judge of Probate of Barnstable County, Massachusetts, and the Registrar of Probate of Barnstable County, Massachusetts. In 1879 Marston was elected Attorney General of Massachusetts, he was re elected in 1880 and 1881.

== Death ==
Marston died in New Bedford, Massachusetts on August 14, 1883.

=== Footnotes ===
Legal offices
Preceded by Charles R. Train	Attorney General of Massachusetts; January 1879–January 1883	Succeeded by Edgar J. Sherman
