= Henry A. Wyman =

American lawyer (1861-1935)

Henry Augustus Wyman

Acting Massachusetts Attorney General
- In office 1919–1920
- Governor: Calvin Coolidge
- Preceded by: Henry Converse Atwill
- Succeeded by: J. Weston Allen

Acting Treasurer and Receiver-General of Massachusetts
- In office September 4, 1920 – September 8, 1920
- Governor: Calvin Coolidge
- Preceded by: Fred J. Burrell
- Succeeded by: James Jackson

Personal details
- Born: February 3, 1861 Skowhegan, Maine
- Died: September 26, 1935 (aged 74) Boston Harbor (aboard ship)
- Party: Republican
- Spouse(s): Anne Cora Southworth, m. February 13, 1891
- Education: Boston University School of Law
- Profession: Lawyer; Law Professor

Henry Augustus Wyman was an American attorney who served as Acting Attorney General of Massachusetts following the resignation of Henry Converse Atwill and Acting Treasurer and Receiver-General of Massachusetts (along with Albert P. Langtry and John R. Macomber) following the resignation of Fred J. Burrell.

== Early life ==
Wyman was born February 3, 1861, in Skowhegan, Maine to Henry A. and Fanny F. (Russell) Wyman.

== Education ==
Wyman was educated in the schools of Skowhegan, Maine and later studied law in the office of Edward H. Bennett in Boston, Massachusetts and at the Boston University School of Law.

== Family life ==
On February 13, 1891, in West Stoughton, Massachusetts, Wyman married Anne Cora Southworth

== Career as a lawyer ==
Wyman was admitted to the bar at Boston in July 1885. Wywam served as the second Assistant Attorney General of Massachusetts, and was a lecturer in criminal law at the Boston University School of Law. Wyman also served as an Assistant United States Attorney for the District of Massachusetts.

== Massachusetts Attorney General ==
In 1919 Wyman was appointed to the office of Attorney General of Massachusetts to fill the vacancy caused by the resignation of Henry C. Atwill. Wyman served as Attorney General during the Boston Police Strike.

== Death ==
Wyman died on September 26, 1935, aboard the ocean liner Caledonia as it was nearing port in East Boston. He was 74 years old.
