= Leyden riot =

The Leyden riot occurred on April 3, 1916, in Haverhill, Massachusetts following the cancelation of a controversial lecture by Dr. Thomas E. Leyden at Haverhill City Hall.

== Early attempts at giving the lecture ==
In March 1916, Haverhill Mayor Albert L. Bartlett refused to grant Dr. Thomas E. Leyden a permit to use City Hall for a lecture regarding the appropriation of state money for parochial schools, called "Why the Roman Hierarchy Is Opposed to the Public Schools", which was seen as anti-Catholic.Following the meeting, Leyden was attacked and he canceled the rest of his engagements in the city.

The Haverhill Ministers' Association, which was made up of ministers from all of the city's Protestant churches, held a protest meeting and adopted a resolution objecting to Bartlett's decision to deny Leyden use of City Hall "irrespective of our several opinions of the issues to be discussed by Dr. Leyden".

The board of aldermen overruled Bartlett's decision and granted Leyden permission to use City Hall for his lecture. On April 2 his lecture was disrupted by mock applause and he retreated to the police station until the crowd over 1,000 dispersed. Leyden was scheduled to give the lecture again the following night and elected to do so.

== Riot ==
On April 3, roughly 10,000 people took to the city streets. Anticipating trouble, the entire 40-man police force had been called out for duty. About 150 people were granted admission to the hall to hear the lecture, but due to the presence of the mob outside, police commissioner Charles M. Hoyt appeared on stage to announce that the meeting had been canceled. However, Leyden and Rev. Robert Atikinson appeared and Atikinson requested that Leyden be allowed to speak. Leyden attempted to speak but was jeered so loudly he gave up. Atkinson attempted to quiet the crowd again, but was grabbed and rushed down the stairs by angry attendees. A glass door on the fire escape was broken and about 100 people surged into the hall. Hoyt promised those who had paid admission that they would be refunded, however Leyden and his secretary, Clarence Howland were nowhere to be found and it was believed that they had already left with the door receipts, which resulted in increased anger from those in the hall (Leyden was actually under guard in the aldermen's room at city hall). Bricks and stones were hurled at City Hall and the police station and a crowd of thousands attempted to force their way past police into the hall. A revolver was fired at the police station and a group broke into the basement of the police station to demand the arrest of Leyden and Howland.

The mob also ransacked the National Club and looted a coal pocket so that the coal could be used as projectiles. A police officer who attempted to prevent entry into city hall was trampled and an officer who attempted to arrest a youth who had been throwing stones was assaulted by the crowd. Another man was beaten in the National Club. A portion of the crowd went to Leonard House, where Leyden was said to have been staying, but they were turned away by City Marshal John J. Mack, who told them Leyden was not there. Another group stoned the home of commissioner Hoyt. Another went to stone the home of Dr. Herbert E. Wales, a member of the committee that had organized the meeting. However, as no one in the group knew which home was Wales', a number homes were stoned before they found the Wales residence.

At 10 pm, Bartlett, arrived at the police station and asked the crowd outside to quietly disperse. The crowd fell back for a time, but the unrest continued. He eventually decided to sound the militia alarm, which alerted members of local command (Co. F of the 8th Regiment), who had been expecting trouble. They assembled the Haverhill armory and marched towards City Hall. They were ordered to charge the crowd with fix bayonets, which scattered the crowd. Two militiamen were injured by a projectiles. At 1 am, 15 officers from the Lawrence, Massachusetts police department arrived to assist the Haverhill police. The crowd was eventually dispersed and no arrests were made.

Leyden was eventually able to exit City Hall through a rear door and was taken by car to Newburyport, Massachusetts. The following day he returned to his home in Somerville, Massachusetts. Upon Leyden's departure from Haverhill, City Marshal Mack told him not to return and if he did he would be arrested for inciting to riot.

== Criminal charges ==
After the riot, Alderman Charles M. Hoyt and the Haverhill Ministers' Association requested a grand jury investigation into the riot. State detectives Arthur G. Wells and Fred F. Flynn spent several weeks investigating the case. On July 12, 1916, Essex County District Attorney Louis Cox issued 53 summons to Haverhill residents to appear before the grand jury investigating the case.

On July 18, Mayor Bartlett and all four members of the board of aldermen (Roswell L. Wood, Albert E. Stickney, Charles M. Hoyt, and Christopher C. Cook) were all indicted on a charge of neglect to suppress an unlawful assembly. They were the first to ever be charged with this crime. On September 13, four more men were indicted in connection with the case. They were:

- James Bradley - disturbing the peace, disturbance of a lawful assembly, and taking part in an unlawful assembly
- William Herlihy - disturbance of a public meeting and taking part in an unlawful assembly
- William F. Hamilton - taking part in an unlawful assembly
- James Henry Sweeney - taking part in an unlawful assembly.

The trial against Mayor Bartlett and the aldermen began on October 23, 1916. The other four defendants were tried separate from the city officials. On October 28, the jury returned not guilty verdicts on all of the charges against Charles M. Hoyt and on one of the two charges against Mayor Bartlett. They were unable to come to an agreement on the charges against Cook, Wood, and Stickney.
