= James M. Swift (lawyer) =

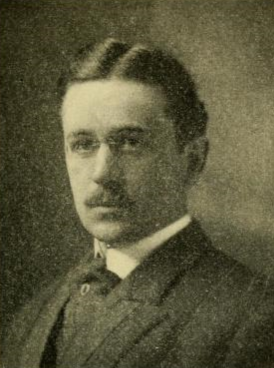

Massachusetts Attorney General
- In office 1911–1914
- Governor: Eugene Noble Foss
- Preceded by: Dana Malone
- Succeeded by: Thomas J. Boynton

District Attorney Southern District of Massachusetts
- In office December 1, 1902 – 1911

Assistant District Attorney Southern District of Massachusetts
- In office 1899–1902

Personal details
- Born: November 3, 1873 Ithaca, Michigan
- Died: July 12, 1946 (aged 72) Boston, Massachusetts
- Party: Republican
- Education: University of Michigan, Harvard Law School

James M. Swift (November 3, 1873 – July 12, 1946) was a lawyer, District Attorney of Massachusetts Southern District and Attorney General of Massachusetts. He had returned to private practice until his death in 1946.

Party political offices
Preceded by Dana Malone	Republican nominee for Attorney General of Massachusetts; 1910, 1911, 1912, 1913	Succeeded by Henry Converse Atwill
Legal offices
Preceded by Dana Malone	Attorney General of Massachusetts; 1911–1914	Succeeded by Thomas J. Boynton
