= Boyd B. Jones =

American attorney

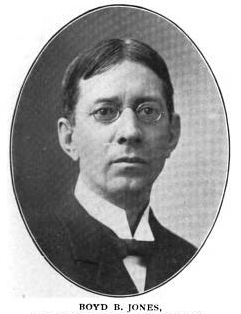

United States Attorney for the District of Massachusetts
- In office 1897–1901
- Preceded by: Sherman Hoar
- Succeeded by: Henry P. Moulton

Personal details
- Born: October 13, 1856 Georgetown, Massachusetts
- Died: June 5, 1930 (aged 73) Haverhill, Massachusetts
- Education: Boston University
- Occupation: Attorney

Boyd B. Jones (October 13, 1856 – June 5, 1930) was an American attorney who served as the United States Attorney for the District of Massachusetts from 1897 to 1901. He later served on the faculty at the Boston University School of Law and was one of the founding members of the Sentinels of the Republic.
