= John C. F. Slayton =

American produce dealer and politician (1856-1922)

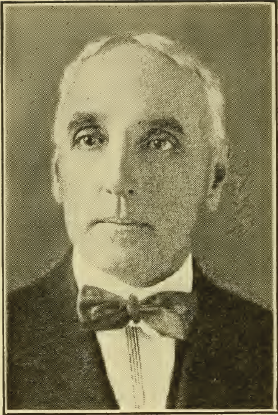

Member of the Massachusetts Executive Council 4th Councilor district
- In office 1921 – January 4, 1922
- Preceded by: George Butler Wason
- Succeeded by: William H. Dolben

Personal details
- Born: John Charles Fremont Slayton; June 27, 1856 Calais, Vermont, U.S.
- Died: January 4, 1922 (aged 65) Melrose, Massachusetts, U.S.
- Party: Republican
- Children: Ralph Slayton, Louise Slayton.
- Education: Morrisville, Vermont Academy
- Occupation: Produce business
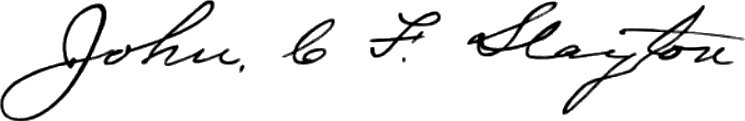
- Signature

John Charles Fremont Slayton (June 27, 1856 – January 4, 1922) was an American produce dealer and politician who served as a member of the Melrose, Massachusetts Board of Aldermen, and on the Massachusetts Executive Council.

== Early life ==
Slayton was born in Calais, Vermont on June 27, 1856. His family moved to Morrisville, Vermont, when he was 7 years old. Slayton was educated in the public schools there, graduating from Morrisville High School. After he graduated from high school, Slayton worked for his father. When he was 35, Slayton moved to Boston.

== Family ==
Slayton had two children Ralph Slayton and Louise (Slayton) Sheldon.

== Business career ==
When he was 35, Slayton moved to Boston and went to work in a produce company. Slayton worked for the firm A. & O. W. Mead. Later on in 1887 Slayton established the firm of Slayton & Boynton, Commission agents in Boston's Haymarket Square.

== Death ==
Slayton died on January 4, 1922.

Political offices
Preceded by George Butler Wason	Member of the Massachusetts Executive Council; 4th Councilor district 1921-January 4, 1922	Succeeded by William H. Dolben
