= Albert L. Bartlett =

American government official

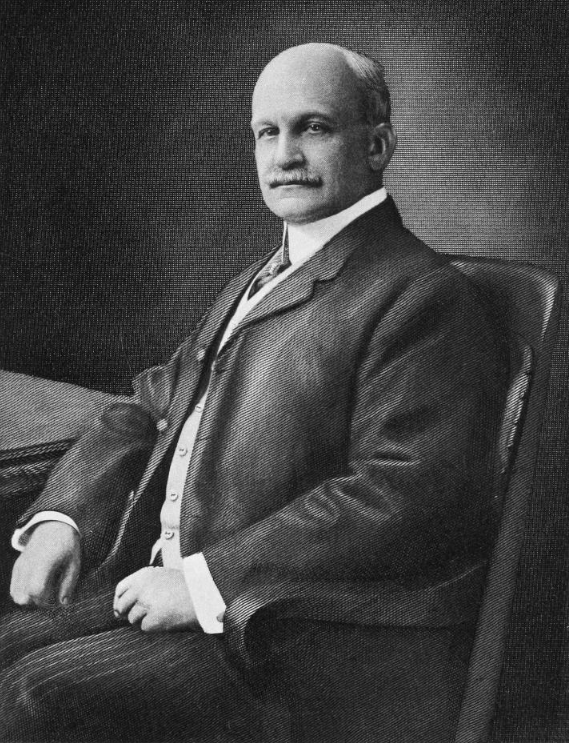

Member of the Massachusetts House of Representatives for the 2nd Essex District
- In office 1931–1934

Member of Haverhill Board of Aldermen and Commissioner of Public Safety
- In office 1920–1924
- Preceded by: Roswell L. Wood
- Succeeded by: Dummer R. Bean
- In office 1912–1915
- Preceded by: Joe W. Bean
- Succeeded by: Charles M. Hoyt

Mayor of Haverhill, Massachusetts
- In office 1915–1917
- Preceded by: Edwin H. Moulton
- Succeeded by: Leslie K. Morris

Superintendent of Haverhill Public Schools
- In office 1888–1897
- Preceded by: William E. Hatch
- Succeeded by: Roscoe D. McKeen

Personal details
- Born: June 1, 1851 Haverhill, Massachusetts
- Died: May 14, 1934 (aged 82) Haverhill, Massachusetts
- Party: Republican
- Education: Dartmouth College
- Occupation: Teacher
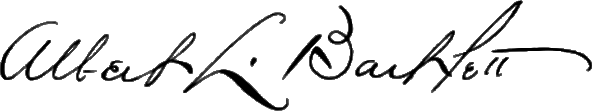
- Signature

Albert Leroy Bartlett (1851–1934) was an American politician who was mayor of Haverhill, Massachusetts from 1915 to 1917 and a member of the Massachusetts House of Representatives from 1931 to 1934.

== Early life ==
Bartlett was born on June 1, 1851, in Haverhill to Thomas and Patience (Hawkins) Bartlett. His father was a farmer and his ancestors included John Winthrop, Thomas Dudley, and Joseph Cilley. In 1872 he graduated from Dartmouth College.

== Teaching ==
After college, Bartlett began a career as an educator. He was a master at the Academy at Sherborn in 1872 and sub-master of Haverhill High School from 1873 to 1875. He then served as master of Bradford High School until that town was annexed by Haverhill in 1882. Afterwards he returned to his former position as Haverhill High's sub-master.

In 1888, Bartlett was named superintendent of Haverhill schools. He was removed from the position on June 2, 1897, when, after four years of trying, the anti-Bartlett faction on the school committee gained enough votes to prevent his reappointment.

After leaving the public school system, Bartlett began writing. He was the author of an elementary school English text book as well as several books on the history of Haverhill. He also continued his work as a public official. In 1889, Bartlett was made a trustee of the Haverhill Public Library. From 1901 to 1911 he served on the city's park commission. In 1907, Bartlett donated land to the city of Haverhill upon which a school bearing his name was constructed.

== Politics ==
In 1912, Bartlett was elected to the Haverhill board of Aldermen. In 1914 he was elected mayor of Haverhill.

In March 1916, Bartlett refused to grant Dr. Thomas E. Leyden a permit to use City Hall for a lecture which was seen as anti-Catholic. The board of aldermen overruled Bartlett and Leyden was eventually given permission to use City Hall for his lecture. On April 3, roughly 10,000 people took to the city streets, resulting in a riot that required the deployment of the state militia. Bartlett and the board of aldermen were indicted for neglecting to suppress an unlawful assembly. They were the first to ever be charged with this crime. Bartlett was found not guilty on one count and the jury did not reach a decision on the other.

In 1920, Bartlett returned to the board of aldermen, where he remained until his retirement in 1924. However, in 1931 Bartlett returned to public office as a member of the Massachusetts House of Representatives. He represented the 2nd Essex district until his death on May 14, 1934.

== See also ==
- 1931–1932 Massachusetts legislature
- 1933–1934 Massachusetts legislature
