= Thomas J. Boynton (politician) =

American politician (1856–1945)

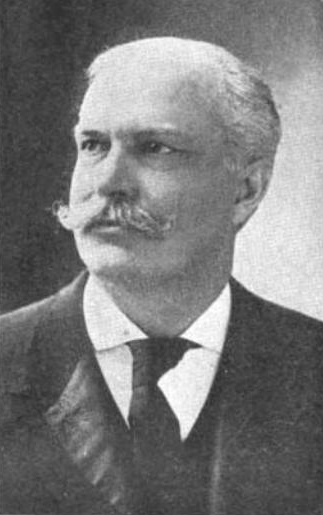

United States Attorney for the District of Massachusetts
- In office 1917–1920
- Preceded by: George W. Anderson
- Succeeded by: Daniel J. Gallagher

Massachusetts Attorney General
- In office 1914–1915
- Governor: David I. Walsh
- Preceded by: James M. Swift
- Succeeded by: Henry Converse Atwill
- Majority: 8,102

Delegate to the 1917 Massachusetts Constitutional Convention
- In office June 6, 1917 – April 6, 1918

Mayor of Everett, Massachusetts
- In office 1903–1904
- Preceded by: Charles Bruce
- Succeeded by: H. Huestis Newton
- In office 1905–1907
- Preceded by: H. Huestis Newton
- Succeeded by: Charles Bruce

Personal details
- Born: December 30, 1856 Westfield, Vermont
- Died: April 14, 1945 (aged 88)
- Party: Democratic

Thomas Jefferson Boynton (December 30, 1856 – April 14, 1945) was a U.S. political figure who served in 1882 as a member of the Vermont legislature, the city solicitor and the Mayor of Everett, Massachusetts and as the Massachusetts Attorney General.

Boynton was born in Westfield, Vermont.

== 1917 Massachusetts Constitutional Convention ==
In 1916 the Massachusetts legislature and electorate approved a calling of a Constitutional Convention. In May 1917, Boynton was elected to serve as a member of the Massachusetts Constitutional Convention of 1917, representing the Twentieth Middlesex District of the Massachusetts House of Representatives.

== Notes ==
Party political offices
Preceded by George W. Anderson	Democratic nominee for Attorney General of Massachusetts; 1913, 1914	Succeeded by Joseph Joyce Donahue
Legal offices
Preceded by James M. Swift	Attorney General of Massachusetts; 1914 - 1915	Succeeded by Henry Converse Atwill
