= J. Weston Allen =

American politician (1872-1942)

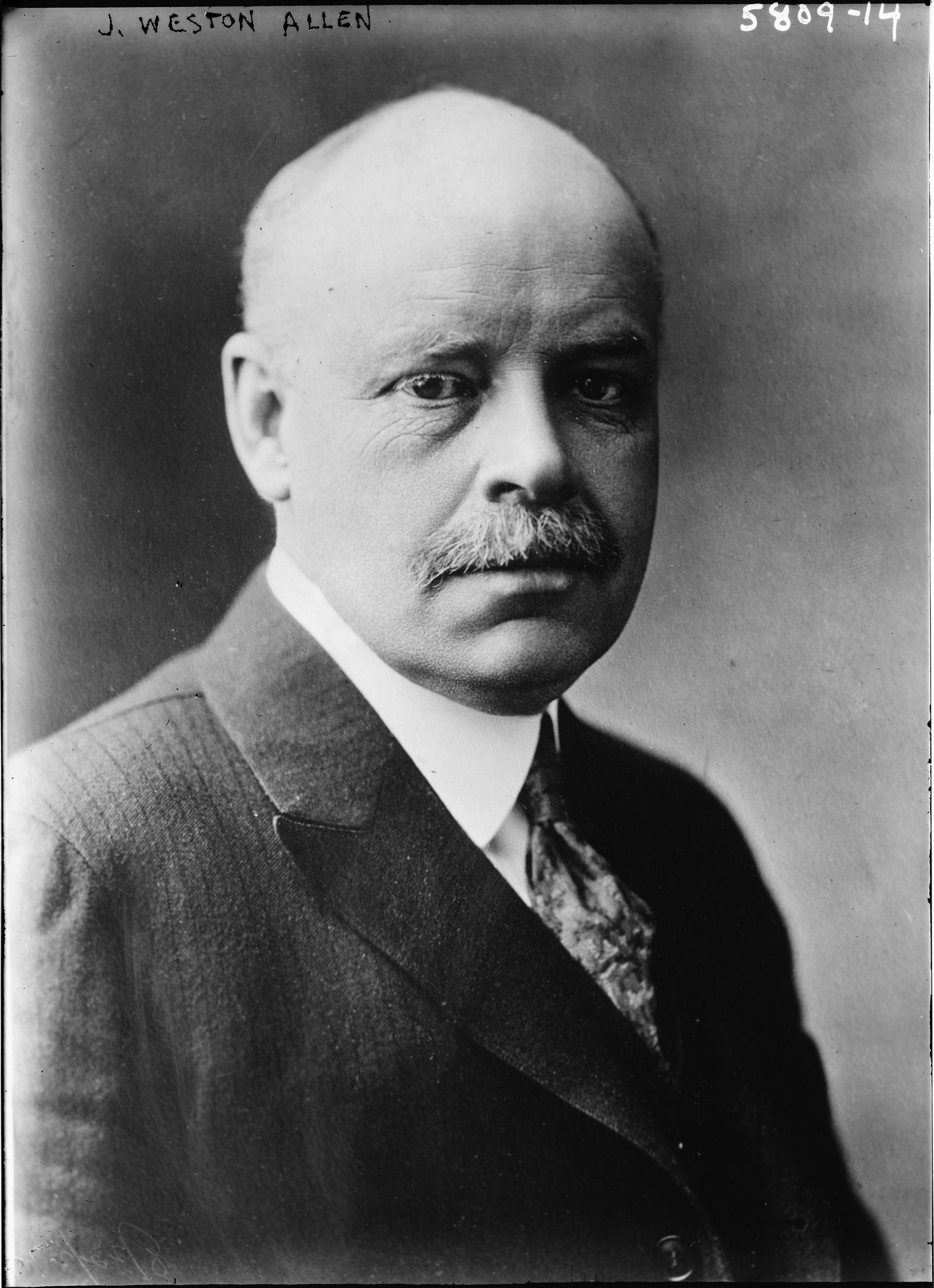
- Allen c. 1900

25th Attorney General of the Commonwealth of Massachusetts
- In office 1920–1923
- Governor: Calvin Coolidge; Channing H. Cox
- Preceded by: Henry A. Wyman
- Succeeded by: Jay R. Benton

Member of the Massachusetts House of Representatives from the 4th Middlesex district
- In office 1915–1918

Personal details
- Born: April 19, 1872 Newton Highlands, Massachusetts
- Died: January 1, 1942 (aged 69) Waverly, New York
- Party: Republican
- Spouse: Caroline Cheney Hills (1901–42)
- Education: Yale University; Harvard Law School
- Profession: Attorney

John Weston Allen (April 19, 1872 – January 1, 1942) was an American politician who served as a member of the Massachusetts House of Representatives from 1915 to 1918 and as Massachusetts Attorney General from 1920 to 1923.

As Attorney General, Allen was aggressive in his pursuit of white collar criminals. During his tenure, Allen prosecuted Thomas W. Lawson, L. C. Van Riper, and Charles Ponzi.

Instead of seeking reelection, Allen ran for Governor of Massachusetts in 1922 but lost the Republican primary election to incumbent Channing H. Cox. Allen served as a member of the United States Attorney General's National Crime Commission from 1926 to 1936 and was the commission's chairman from 1930 to 1936.

== See also ==
- 1915 Massachusetts legislature
- 1917 Massachusetts legislature
- 1918 Massachusetts legislature

Party political offices
| Preceded by Henry Converse Atwill | Republican nominee for Attorney General of Massachusetts; 1919, 1920 | Succeeded by Jay R. Benton |
Political offices
| Preceded by Henry A. Wyman | Massachusetts Attorney General; 1920–1923 | Succeeded by Jay R. Benton |
