= Massachusetts Attorney General =

Chief legal officer of Massachusetts

Attorney General of the Commonwealth of Massachusetts
- Seal of Massachusetts

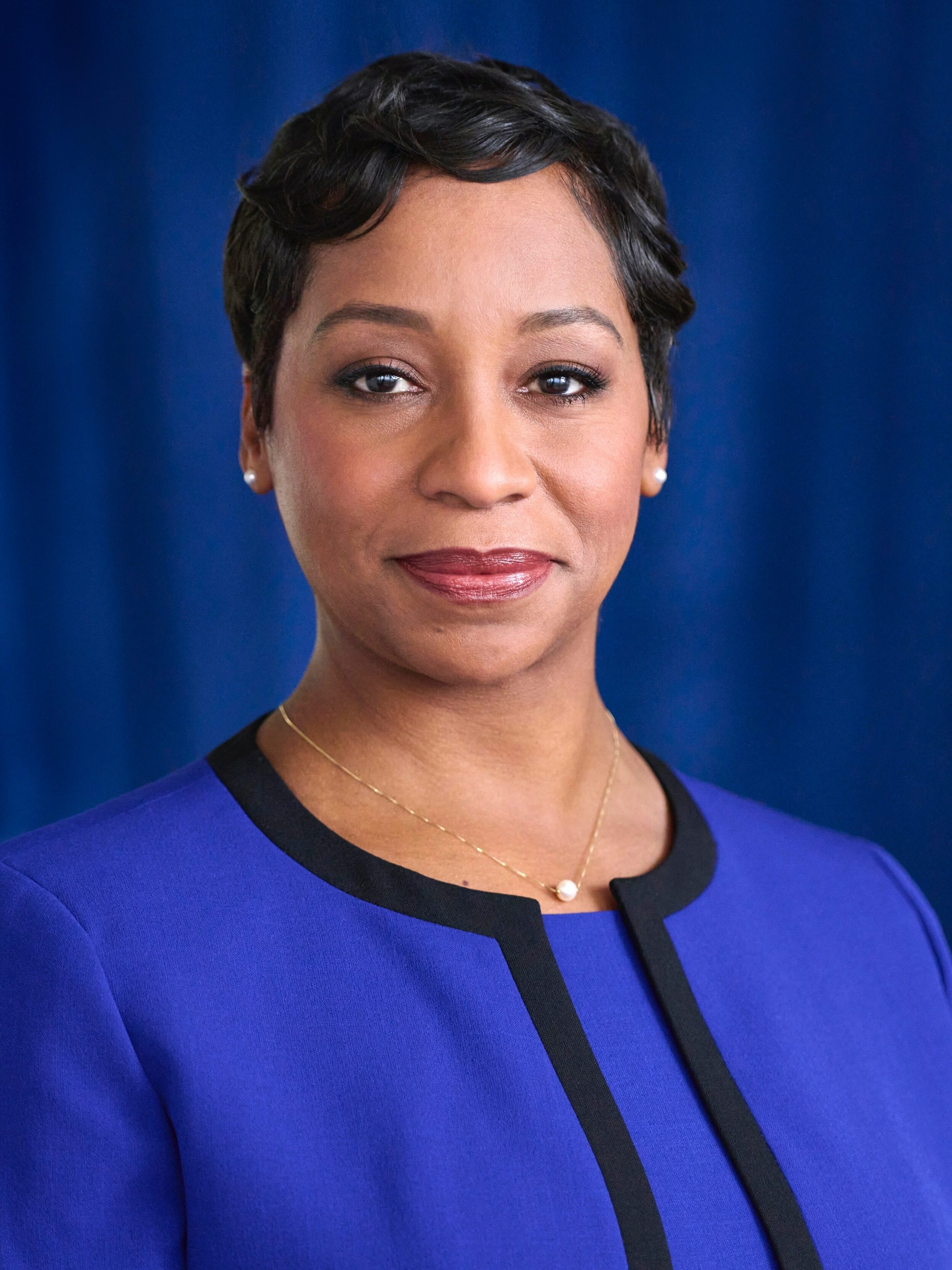
- Incumbent; Andrea Campbell since January 18, 2023
- Government of Massachusetts
- Style: The Honorable
- Type: Chief legal officer Constitutional officer
- Residence: None official
- Seat: One Ashburton Place, Boston, Massachusetts
- Nominator: Nominating petition, Political parties
- Appointer: Popular vote
- Term length: 4 years, no limit
- Constituting instrument: Constitution of Massachusetts
- Formation: 1702; 324 years ago
- First holder: Paul Dudley
- Succession: Third
- Website: www.mass.gov/ago

The Massachusetts attorney general is an elected constitutionally defined executive officer of the Massachusetts government. The officeholder is the chief lawyer and law enforcement officer of the Commonwealth of Massachusetts. The officeholder also acts as an advocate and resource for the Commonwealth and its residents in many areas, including consumer protection, combating fraud and corruption, protecting civil rights, and maintaining economic competition. The current attorney general is Andrea Campbell.

== Qualifications ==
Any person seeking to become the attorney general of Massachusetts must meet the following requirements:

- Be at least eighteen years of age
- Be a registered voter in Massachusetts
- Be a Massachusetts resident for at least five years when elected
- Receive 10,000 signatures from registered voters on nomination papers
- Be a member of the Massachusetts Bar

== History ==
When the 1780 state constitution was first enacted, the attorney general was appointed by the governor, with the advice and consent of the Governor's Council. The office was abolished in 1843 and re-established in 1849. In 1855 the constitution was amended so that the attorney general (along with a number of other constitutionally enumerated offices) was elected by the people. The length of the term of office has matched that of the governor, and elections are held concurrently with those for other constitutional office. Elections were first held annually, became biennial (every two years) in 1920, and quadrennial (every four years) in 1966.

== Organization ==
The Office of the Attorney General is organized into six bureaus: Executive; Energy and Environmental; Criminal; Government; Health Care and Fair Competition; and Public Protection and Advocacy. Each bureau is divided into divisions and teams. These bureaus and divisions have distinct missions but work closely together to ensure the Attorney General's Office provides the highest level of public protection.

== List of attorneys general ==
=== Province of Massachusetts Bay ===
Office established at the start of Queen Anne's War in 1702.

#	Name	Term of service
1	Paul Dudley	1702–1718
2	John Valentine	1718–1720
3	Thomas Newton	1720–1721
–	Vacant	1721–1722
4	John Overing	1722–1723
–	Vacant	1723–1725
5	John Read	1725–1728
6	Joseph Hiller	1728–1729
7	John Overing	1729–1736
8	William Brattle	1736–1738
9	John Overing	1739–1748
10	Edmund Trowbridge	1749–1767
11	Jeremiah Gridley	1767
–	Vacant	1767
12	Jonathan Sewall	1767–1774
–	Vacant	1774–1776
13	Benjamin Kent	1776–1777
14	Robert Treat Paine	1777–1780

=== Commonwealth of Massachusetts ===
Office reestablished upon the ratification of the Constitution of Massachusetts in 1780.

No.	Portrait	Name	Prior experience	Municipality of residence	Term of service	Political party
Party affiliation: Republican (25) Democratic (12) Democratic-Republican (3) Whig (3) Anti-Jacksonian (1) Independent (1)
1		Robert Treat Paine			1780–1790	Independent
2		James Sullivan			1790–1807	Democratic–Republican (Note: Sullivan was independent, but switched to the Democratic–Republican Party between 1792 and 1794.)
3		Barnabas Bidwell			1807–1810	Democratic–Republican
4		Perez Morton			1810–1832	Democratic–Republican
5		James T. Austin			1832–1843	National Republican
–		Office abolished			1843–1849	
6		John H. Clifford			1849–1853	Whig
7		Rufus Choate			1853–1854	Whig
8		John H. Clifford			1854–1858	Whig
9		Stephen Henry Phillips			1858–1861	Republican
10		Dwight Foster			1861–1864	Republican
11		Chester I. Reed			1864–1867	Republican
12		Charles Allen			1867–1872	Republican
13		Charles R. Train			1872–1879	Republican
14		George Marston			1879–1883	Republican
15		Edgar J. Sherman			1883–1887	Republican
16		Andrew J. Waterman			1887–1891	Republican
17		Albert E. Pillsbury			1891–1894	Republican
18		Hosea M. Knowlton			1894–1902	Republican
19		Herbert Parker			1902–1906	Republican
20		Dana Malone			1906–1911	Republican
21		James M. Swift			1911–1914	Republican
22		Thomas J. Boynton			1914–1915	Democratic
23		Henry Converse Atwill			1915–1919	Republican
24		Henry A. Wyman			1919–1920	Republican
25		J. Weston Allen	House 1915 to 1918, Attorney-at-Law	Newton	1920–1923	Republican
26		Jay R. Benton	Mass. House 1917, '18; Ass't Atty. Gen'l 1918-'22	Belmont	1923–1927	Republican
27		Arthur K. Reading	Mass House 1919 to 1922, Middlesex County District Attorney, 1923-'26, Lawyer	Cambridge	1927–1928	Republican
28		Joseph E. Warner	Taunton Municipal Council 1907-'11, Trust. Pub. Library, Mass. House 1913-'20, Speaker 1919-'20, Delegate to Rep. National Convention 1920, Asst. Atty. Gen. 1923-'28, Attorney-at-Law	Taunton	1928–1935	Republican
29		Paul A. Dever	Middlesex County Public Administrator, Mass. House 1929-'34, Lawyer	Cambridge	1935–1941	Democratic
30		Robert T. Bushnell	Middlesex County District Attorney, Lawyer	West Newton	1941–1945	Republican
31		Clarence A. Barnes	Mansfield Town Moderator and Counsel, Mass. House 1912-'13, Constitutional Convention, Governor's Council 1943-'44, Lawyer	Mansfield	1945–1949	Republican
32		Francis E. Kelly	Boston City Council, Lieutenant Governor, Fall River Finance Commissioner, Attorney at law	Dorchester, Boston	1949–1953	Democratic
33		George Fingold	Asst. Attorney General, Asst. District Attorney, City Council, Lawyer	Concord	1953–1958	Republican
34		Edward J. McCormack Jr.	Boston City Council, Lawyer	Dorchester, Boston	1958–1963	Democratic
35		Edward W. Brooke	Boston Finance Commission (chairman), Mass. Advisory Committee, U.S. Civil Rights Commission (chairman), Lawyer	Newton Centre	1963–1967	Republican
36		Edward T. Martin			1967	Republican
37		Elliot Richardson	Lieutenant Governor, United States Attorney for the District of Massachusetts, Assistant Secretary of the United States Department of Health, Education, and Welfare, Brookline Town Meeting member, Lawyer	Brookline	1967–1969	Republican
38		Robert H. Quinn	Speaker of the Massachusetts House of Representatives, Member of the Massachusetts House of Representatives, Lawyer	Dorchester, Boston	1969–1975	Democratic
39		Francis X. Bellotti	Lieutenant Governor, Attorney	Quincy	1975–1987	Democratic
40		James Shannon	Representative in Congress, Lawyer	Lawrence	1987–1991	Democratic
41		L. Scott Harshbarger	Middlesex County District Attorney; General Counsel, State Ethics Commission; Chief, Public Protection Bureau, Department of Attorney General; Deputy Chief Counsel, Massachusetts Defenders Committee	Westwood	1991–1999	Democratic
42		Thomas Reilly	Middlesex County District Attorney	Watertown	1999–2007	Democratic
43		Martha Coakley	Middlesex County District Attorney	Medford	2007–2015	Democratic
44		Maura Healey	Massachusetts Attorney General's Office as the Chief of the Civil Rights Division, Chief of the Public Protection and Advocacy Bureau, Chief of the Business and Labor Bureau, litigator and junior partner at the international law firm WilmerHale, Special Assistant District Attorney for Middlesex County, clerk for Judge David Mazzone in the United States District Court in Massachusetts, former professional basketball player	Boston	2015–2023	Democratic
Acting		Kate R. Cook	First Assistant Attorney General of Massachusetts from January 2022 until January 5, 2023	Boston	January 5, 2023	Independent
Acting		Bessie Dewar	State Solicitor of Massachusetts since January 2016	Boston	January 5–18, 2023	Democratic
45		Andrea Campbell	Member of the Boston City Council, President of the Boston City Council, 2021 Boston mayoral candidate, Lawyer	Boston	2023–present	Democratic

Maura Healey currently resides in Arlington, MA.
