= Political party strength in Massachusetts =

Politics in the US state of Massachusetts

The following table indicates the party of elected officials in Massachusetts:

- Governor
- Lieutenant Governor
- Secretary of the Commonwealth
- Attorney General
- Treasurer and Receiver-General
- Auditor

The table also indicates the historical party composition in the:

- Massachusetts Senate
- Massachusetts House of Representatives
- State delegation to the United States Senate
- State delegation to the United States House of Representatives

For years in which a United States presidential election was held, the table indicates which party's nominees received the state's electoral votes, and whether they ✓ won the election or ✗ lost the election.

Each time an official is elected or re-elected, a new box for that official is included to indicate their repeated political party strength.

== 1780–1843 ==
Year	Executive/Constitutional offices					General Court		United States Congress			Electoral votes
Year	Governor	Lt. Governor	Sec. of the Commonwealth	Attorney General	Treasurer	Senate	House	U.S. Senator (Class I)	U.S. Senator (Class II)	U.S. House	Electoral votes
1780	John Hancock (I)	Thomas Cushing (I)	John Avery Jr. (F)	Robert Treat Paine (F)	Henry Gardner (NP)						
1781	John Hancock (I)	Thomas Cushing (I)	John Avery Jr. (F)	Robert Treat Paine (F)	Henry Gardner (NP)	[?]	[?]				
1782	John Hancock (I)	Thomas Cushing (I)	John Avery Jr. (F)	Robert Treat Paine (F)	Henry Gardner (NP)	[?]	[?]				
1783	John Hancock (I)	Thomas Cushing (I)	John Avery Jr. (F)	Robert Treat Paine (F)	Thomas Ivers (NP)	[?]	[?]				
1784	John Hancock (I)	Thomas Cushing (I)	John Avery Jr. (F)	Robert Treat Paine (F)	Thomas Ivers (NP)	[?]	[?]				
1785	vacant (Note: Lieutenant Governor acted as governor for unexpired term.)	Thomas Cushing (I)	John Avery Jr. (F)	Robert Treat Paine (F)	Thomas Ivers (NP)	[?]	[?]				
1785	James Bowdoin (F)	Thomas Cushing (I)	John Avery Jr. (F)	Robert Treat Paine (F)	Thomas Ivers (NP)	[?]	[?]				
1786	James Bowdoin (F)	Thomas Cushing (I)	John Avery Jr. (F)	Robert Treat Paine (F)	Thomas Ivers (NP)	[?]	[?]				
1787	John Hancock (I)	Thomas Cushing (I)	John Avery Jr. (F)	Robert Treat Paine (F)	Alexander; Hodgdon (NP)	[?]	[?]				
1788	John Hancock (I)	Benjamin Lincoln (F)	John Avery Jr. (F)	Robert Treat Paine (F)	Alexander; Hodgdon (NP)	[?]	[?]				
1789	John Hancock (I)	Samuel Adams (DR)	John Avery Jr. (F)	Robert Treat Paine (F)	Alexander; Hodgdon (NP)	F majority	F majority	Tristram Dalton (PA)	Caleb Strong (PA)	6PA, 2AA	Washington ✓ / Adams ✓
1790	John Hancock (I)	Samuel Adams (DR)	John Avery Jr. (F)	James Sullivan (DR)	Alexander; Hodgdon (NP)	F majority	F majority	Tristram Dalton (PA)	Caleb Strong (PA)	6PA, 2AA	Washington ✓ / Adams ✓
1791	John Hancock (I)	Samuel Adams (DR)	John Avery Jr. (F)	James Sullivan (DR)	Alexander; Hodgdon (NP)	F majority	F majority	George Cabot (PA)	Caleb Strong (PA)	7PA, 1AA	Washington ✓ / Adams ✓
1792	John Hancock (I)	Samuel Adams (DR)	John Avery Jr. (F)	James Sullivan (DR)	Thomas Davis (NP)	F majority	F majority	George Cabot (PA)	Caleb Strong (PA)	7PA, 1AA	Washington ✓ / Adams ✓
1793	vacant	Samuel Adams (DR)	John Avery Jr. (F)	James Sullivan (DR)	Thomas Davis (NP)	F majority	F majority	George Cabot (PA)	Caleb Strong (PA)	11PA, 3AA	Washington ✓ / Adams ✓
1794	Samuel Adams (DR)	Moses Gill (F)	John Avery Jr. (F)	James Sullivan (DR)	Thomas Davis (NP)	F majority	F majority	George Cabot (PA)	Caleb Strong (PA)	11PA, 3AA	Washington ✓ / Adams ✓
1795	Samuel Adams (DR)	Moses Gill (F)	John Avery Jr. (F)	James Sullivan (DR)	Thomas Davis (NP)	F majority	F majority	George Cabot (F)	Caleb Strong (F)	10F, 4DR	Washington ✓ / Adams ✓
1796	Samuel Adams (DR)	Moses Gill (F)	John Avery Jr. (F)	James Sullivan (DR)	Thomas Davis (NP)	F majority	F majority	Benjamin Goodhue (F)	Theodore Sedgwick (F)	9F, 5DR	Washington ✓ / Adams ✓
1797	Increase Sumner (F)	Moses Gill (F)	John Avery Jr. (F)	James Sullivan (DR)	Peleg Coffin Jr. (F)	29F, 1DR, 10?	93F, 54DR, 52?	Benjamin Goodhue (F)	Theodore Sedgwick (F)	11F, 3DR	Adams (F) ✓ / T. Pinckney (F) ✗
1798	Increase Sumner (F)	Moses Gill (F)	John Avery Jr. (F)	James Sullivan (DR)	Peleg Coffin Jr. (F)	29F, 4DR, 7?	139F, 54DR, 22?	Benjamin Goodhue (F)	Theodore Sedgwick (F)	11F, 3DR	Adams (F) ✓ / T. Pinckney (F) ✗
1799	vacant	Moses Gill (F)	John Avery Jr. (F)	James Sullivan (DR)	Peleg Coffin Jr. (F)	35F, 3DR, 2?	122F, 61DR, 30?	Benjamin Goodhue (F)	Samuel Dexter (F)	12F, 2DR	Adams (F) ✓ / T. Pinckney (F) ✗
1800	Governor's Council (Note: Due to the offices of both governor and lieutenant governor being vacant, the council acted as governor.)	vacant	John Avery Jr. (F)	James Sullivan (DR)	Peleg Coffin Jr. (F)	33F, 4DR, 3?	166F, 81DR, 13?	Benjamin Goodhue (F)	Samuel Dexter (F)	11F, 3DR	Adams (F) ✓ / T. Pinckney (F) ✗
1800	Caleb Strong (F)	Samuel Phillips Jr. (F)	John Avery Jr. (F)	James Sullivan (DR)	Peleg Coffin Jr. (F)	33F, 4DR, 3?	166F, 81DR, 13?	Jonathan Mason (F)	Dwight Foster (F)	11F, 3DR	Adams (F) ✓ / T. Pinckney (F) ✗
1801	Caleb Strong (F)	Samuel Phillips Jr. (F)	John Avery Jr. (F)	James Sullivan (DR)	Peleg Coffin Jr. (F)	23F, 16DR, 1?	152F, 113DR, 14?	Jonathan Mason (F)	Dwight Foster (F)	7F, 7DR	Adams/ C. C. Pinckney (F) ✗
1802	Caleb Strong (F)	Edward Robbins (F)	John Avery Jr. (F)	James Sullivan (DR)	Jonathan Jackson (F)	28F, 12DR	133F, 88DR, 13?	Jonathan Mason (F)	Dwight Foster (F)	8F, 6DR	Adams/ C. C. Pinckney (F) ✗
1803	Caleb Strong (F)	Edward Robbins (F)	John Avery Jr. (F)	James Sullivan (DR)	Jonathan Jackson (F)	28F, 12DR	152F, 102DR, 4?	John Quincy Adams (F)	Timothy Pickering (F)	10F, 7DR	Adams/ C. C. Pinckney (F) ✗
1804	Caleb Strong (F)	Edward Robbins (F)	John Avery Jr. (F)	James Sullivan (DR)	Jonathan Jackson (F)	26F, 14DR	150F, 129DR, 2?	John Quincy Adams (F)	Timothy Pickering (F)	10F, 7DR	Adams/ C. C. Pinckney (F) ✗
1805	Caleb Strong (F)	Edward Robbins (F)	John Avery Jr. (F)	James Sullivan (DR)	Jonathan Jackson (F)	22F, 18DR	181F, 163DR, 1I, 2?	John Quincy Adams (F)	Timothy Pickering (F)	10DR, 7F	Jefferson/ G. Clinton (DR) ✓
1806	Caleb Strong (F)	Edward Robbins (F)	Jonathan L. Austin (DR)	James Sullivan (DR)	Thomson J. Skinner (DR)	21DR, 19F	263DR, 215F, 3?	John Quincy Adams (F)	Timothy Pickering (F)	10DR, 7F	Jefferson/ G. Clinton (DR) ✓
1807	Jonathan L. Austin (DR)	Thomson J. Skinner (DR)	James Sullivan (DR)	Levi Lincoln Sr. (DR)	Barnabas Bidwell (DR)	21DR, 19F	250DR, 130F, 2?	John Quincy Adams (F)	Timothy Pickering (F)	11DR, 6F	Jefferson/ G. Clinton (DR) ✓
1808	vacant	William Tudor (F)	Josiah Dwight (I)	Levi Lincoln Sr. (DR)	Barnabas Bidwell (DR)	23F, 17DR	253F, 231DR	James Lloyd (F)	Timothy Pickering (F)	11DR, 6F	Jefferson/ G. Clinton (DR) ✓
1809	Christopher Gore (F)	William Tudor (F)	Josiah Dwight (I)	David Cobb (F)	Barnabas Bidwell (DR)	22F, 18DR	316F, 278DR	James Lloyd (F)	Timothy Pickering (F)	9F, 8DR	C. C. Pinckney/ King (F) ✗
1810	Elbridge Gerry (DR)	William Gray (DR)	Benjamin Homans (DR)	Perez Morton (DR)	Thomas Harris (NP)	20F, 20DR (Note: Elected Harrison Gray Otis, a Federalist, as Senate President.)	335DR, 308F	James Lloyd (F)	Timothy Pickering (F)	10F, 7DR	C. C. Pinckney/ King (F) ✗
1811	Elbridge Gerry (DR)	William Gray (DR)	Benjamin Homans (DR)	Perez Morton (DR)	Jonathan L. Austin (DR)	21DR, 19F	345DR, 315F	James Lloyd (F)	Joseph Bradley; Varnum (DR)	9DR, 8F	C. C. Pinckney/ King (F) ✗
1812	Caleb Strong (F)	William Phillips Jr. (F)	Alden Bradford (F)	Perez Morton (DR)	John T. Apthorp (F)	29DR, 11F	429F, 320DR	James Lloyd (F)	Joseph Bradley; Varnum (DR)	9DR, 8F	C. C. Pinckney/ King (F) ✗
1813	Caleb Strong (F)	William Phillips Jr. (F)	Alden Bradford (F)	Perez Morton (DR)	John T. Apthorp (F)	29F, 11DR	420F, 215DR, 1?	Christopher Gore (F)	Joseph Bradley; Varnum (DR)	16F, 4DR	D. Clinton/ Ingersoll (F) ✗
1814	Caleb Strong (F)	William Phillips Jr. (F)	Alden Bradford (F)	Perez Morton (DR)	John T. Apthorp (F)	27F, 13DR	354F, 159DR, 1?	Christopher Gore (F)	Joseph Bradley; Varnum (DR)	16F, 4DR	D. Clinton/ Ingersoll (F) ✗
1815	Caleb Strong (F)	William Phillips Jr. (F)	Alden Bradford (F)	Perez Morton (DR)	John T. Apthorp (F)	25F, 15DR	303F, 149DR	Christopher Gore (F)	Joseph Bradley; Varnum (DR)	18F, 2DR	D. Clinton/ Ingersoll (F) ✗
1816	Caleb Strong (F)	William Phillips Jr. (F)	Alden Bradford (F)	Perez Morton (DR)	John T. Apthorp (F)	22F, 18DR	324F, 214DR, 3?	Eli P. Ashmun (F)	Joseph Bradley; Varnum (DR)	18F, 2DR	D. Clinton/ Ingersoll (F) ✗
1817	Caleb Strong (F)	William Phillips Jr. (F)	Alden Bradford (F)	Perez Morton (DR)	Daniel Sargent (F)	27F, 13DR	189F, 92DR, 5?	Eli P. Ashmun (F)	Harrison Gray Otis (F)	11F, 9DR	King/ Howard (F) ✗
1818	Caleb Strong (F)	William Phillips Jr. (F)	Alden Bradford (F)	Perez Morton (DR)	Daniel Sargent (F)	26F, 14DR	132F, 82DR, 10?	Prentiss Mellen (F)	Harrison Gray Otis (F)	11F, 9DR	King/ Howard (F) ✗
1819	Caleb Strong (F)	William Phillips Jr. (F)	Alden Bradford (F)	Perez Morton (DR)	Daniel Sargent (F)	22F, 18DR	231F, 161DR, 16?	Prentiss Mellen (F)	Harrison Gray Otis (F)	13DR, 7F	King/ Howard (F) ✗
1820	Caleb Strong (F)	William Phillips Jr. (F)	Alden Bradford (F)	Perez Morton (DR)	Daniel Sargent (F)	23F, 8DR	87F, 64DR, 42?	Prentiss Mellen (F)	Harrison Gray Otis (F)	14DR, 6F	King/ Howard (F) ✗
1821	Caleb Strong (F)	William Phillips Jr. (F)	Alden Bradford (F)	Perez Morton (DR)	Daniel Sargent (F)	24F, 7DR	F majority	Elijah H. Mills (F)	Harrison Gray Otis (F)	7F, 6DR	8 – Monroe ✓ / Stockton ✗ (DR/F); 7 – Monroe/ Tompkins ✓ (DR)
1822	Caleb Strong (F)	William Phillips Jr. (F)	Alden Bradford (F)	Perez Morton (DR)	Nahum Mitchell (F)	31F, 9DR	105F, 53DR, 2?	Elijah H. Mills (F)	James Lloyd (F)	7F, 6DR	8 – Monroe ✓ / Stockton ✗ (DR/F); 7 – Monroe/ Tompkins ✓ (DR)
1823	William Eustis (DR)	Levi Lincoln Jr. (DR)	Alden Bradford (F)	Perez Morton (DR)	Nahum Mitchell (F)	24DR, 16F	DR majority	Elijah H. Mills (F)	James Lloyd (F)	7F, 6DR	8 – Monroe ✓ / Stockton ✗ (DR/F); 7 – Monroe/ Tompkins ✓ (DR)
1824	William Eustis (DR)	Marcus Morton (DR)	Edward D. Bangs (NR)	Perez Morton (DR)	Nahum Mitchell (F)	28DR, 12F	DR majority	Elijah H. Mills (F)	James Lloyd (F)	7F, 6DR	8 – Monroe ✓ / Stockton ✗ (DR/F); 7 – Monroe/ Tompkins ✓ (DR)
1825	vacant	Marcus Morton (DR)	Edward D. Bangs (NR)	Perez Morton (DR)	Nahum Mitchell (F)	NR majority	NR majority	Elijah H. Mills (NR)	James Lloyd (NR)	12NR, 1J	Adams/ Calhoun (NR) ✓
1825	Levi Lincoln Jr. (NR)	Thomas L. Winthrop (DR)	Edward D. Bangs (NR)	Perez Morton (DR)	Nahum Mitchell (F)	NR majority	NR majority	Elijah H. Mills (NR)	James Lloyd (NR)	12NR, 1J	Adams/ Calhoun (NR) ✓
1826	Levi Lincoln Jr. (NR)	Thomas L. Winthrop (DR)	Edward D. Bangs (NR)	Perez Morton (DR)	Nahum Mitchell (F)	NR majority	NR majority	Elijah H. Mills (NR)	Nathaniel Silsbee (NR)	12NR, 1J	Adams/ Calhoun (NR) ✓
1827	Levi Lincoln Jr. (NR)	Thomas L. Winthrop (DR)	Edward D. Bangs (NR)	Perez Morton (DR)	Joseph Sewall (NP)	NR majority	NR majority	Daniel Webster (NR)	Nathaniel Silsbee (NR)	13NR	Adams/ Calhoun (NR) ✓
1828	Levi Lincoln Jr. (NR)	Thomas L. Winthrop (DR)	Edward D. Bangs (NR)	Perez Morton (DR)	Joseph Sewall (NP)	NR majority	NR majority	Daniel Webster (NR)	Nathaniel Silsbee (NR)	13NR	Adams/ Calhoun (NR) ✓
1829	Levi Lincoln Jr. (NR)	Thomas L. Winthrop (DR)	Edward D. Bangs (NR)	Perez Morton (DR)	Joseph Sewall (NP)	37NR, 1D, 2?	NR majority	Daniel Webster (NR)	Nathaniel Silsbee (NR)	13NR	Adams/ Rush (NR) ✗
1830	Levi Lincoln Jr. (NR)	Thomas L. Winthrop (DR)	Edward D. Bangs (NR)	Perez Morton (DR)	Joseph Sewall (NP)	38NR, 1A-M, 1D	NR majority	Daniel Webster (NR)	Nathaniel Silsbee (NR)	13NR	Adams/ Rush (NR) ✗
1831	Levi Lincoln Jr. (NR)	Thomas L. Winthrop (DR)	Edward D. Bangs (NR)	Perez Morton (DR)	Joseph Sewall (NP)	29NR, 6A-M, 2D, 3?	320NR, 87A-M, 68D, 6WM	Daniel Webster (NR)	Nathaniel Silsbee (NR)	13NR	Adams/ Rush (NR) ✗
1832	Levi Lincoln Jr. (NR)	Thomas L. Winthrop (DR)	Edward D. Bangs (NR)	James T. Austin (NR)	Hezekiah Barnard (NR)	36NR, 3A-M, 1D	313NR, 119A-M, 92D, 4?	Daniel Webster (NR)	Nathaniel Silsbee (NR)	13NR	Adams/ Rush (NR) ✗
1833	Levi Lincoln Jr. (NR)	Samuel Turell; Armstrong (NR)	Edward D. Bangs (NR)	James T. Austin (NR)	Hezekiah Barnard (NR)	37NR, 3A-M	372NR, 117A-M, 73D, 11?	Daniel Webster (NR)	Nathaniel Silsbee (NR)	9NR, 2A-M, 1J	Clay/ Sergeant (AJ) ✗
1834	John Davis (W)	Samuel Turell; Armstrong (W)	Edward D. Bangs (W)	James T. Austin (NR)	Hezekiah Barnard (NR)	32NR, 8A-M	314NR, 131A-M, 116D	Daniel Webster (NR)	Nathaniel Silsbee (NR)	9NR, 2A-M, 1J	Clay/ Sergeant (AJ) ✗
1835	vacant	Samuel Turell; Armstrong (W)	Edward D. Bangs (W)	James T. Austin (NR)	Hezekiah Barnard (NR)	40W	450W, 87D, 78A-M, 3WM	Daniel Webster (NR)	John Davis (NR)	8W, 3A-M, 1J	Clay/ Sergeant (AJ) ✗
1836	Edward Everett (W)	George Hull (W)	John P. Bigelow (W)	James T. Austin (NR)	Hezekiah Barnard (NR)	22W, 10D, 8A-M	397W, 174D, 53A-M	Daniel Webster (NR)	John Davis (NR)	8W, 3A-M, 1J	Clay/ Sergeant (AJ) ✗
1837	Edward Everett (W)	George Hull (W)	John P. Bigelow (W)	James T. Austin (NR)	David Wilder Jr. (W)	24W, 16D	373W, 262D	Daniel Webster (W)	John Davis (W)	10W, 2D	Webster/ Granger (W) ✗
1838	Edward Everett (W)	George Hull (W)	John P. Bigelow (W)	James T. Austin (NR)	David Wilder Jr. (W)	40W	363W, 114D, 3?	Daniel Webster (W)	John Davis (W)	10W, 2D	Webster/ Granger (W) ✗
1839	Edward Everett (W)	George Hull (W)	John P. Bigelow (W)	James T. Austin (NR)	David Wilder Jr. (W)	37W, 3D	344W, 178D	Daniel Webster (W)	John Davis (W)	10W, 2D	Webster/ Granger (W) ✗
1840	Marcus Morton (D)	George Hull (W)	John P. Bigelow (W)	James T. Austin (NR)	David Wilder Jr. (W)	21W, 19D	277W, 242D	Daniel Webster (W)	John Davis (W)	10W, 2D	Webster/ Granger (W) ✗
1841	John Davis (W)	George Hull (W)	John P. Bigelow (W)	James T. Austin (NR)	David Wilder Jr. (W)	37W, 3D	278W, 119D	Rufus Choate (W)	Isaac C. Bates (W)	11W, 1D	Harrison/ Tyler (W) ✓
1842	John Davis (W)	George Hull (W)	John P. Bigelow (W)	James T. Austin (NR)	Thomas Russell (NP)	27W, 13D	201W, 135D	Rufus Choate (W)	Isaac C. Bates (W)	11W, 1D	Harrison/ Tyler (W) ✓
1843	Marcus Morton (D)	Henry H. Childs (D)	John A. Bolles (W)	office abolished	John Mills (W)	28D, 12W	177W, 172D, 3Lty	Rufus Choate (W)	Isaac C. Bates (W)	8W, 2D	Harrison/ Tyler (W) ✓

== 1844–present ==
Year	Executive/Constitutional offices						General Court		United States Congress			Electoral votes
Year	Governor	Lt. Governor	Sec. of the Commonwealth	Attorney General	Treasurer	Auditor	Senate	House	U.S. Senator (Class I)	U.S. Senator (Class II)	U.S. House	Electoral votes
1844	George N. Briggs (W)	John Reed Jr. (W)	John G. Palfrey (W)	no such office	Thomas Russell (NP)	no such office	34W, 6D	185W, 133D, 4Lty	Rufus Choate (W)	Isaac C. Bates (W)	8W, 2D	
1845	George N. Briggs (W)	John Reed Jr. (W)	John G. Palfrey (W)	no such office	Joseph Barrett (NP)	no such office	40W	200W, 70D, 2Lty	Daniel Webster (W)	John Davis (W)	10W	Clay/ Frelinghuysen (W) ✗
1846	George N. Briggs (W)	John Reed Jr. (W)	John G. Palfrey (W)	no such office	Joseph Barrett (NP)	no such office	40W	198W, 63D, 4KN	Daniel Webster (W)	John Davis (W)	10W	Clay/ Frelinghuysen (W) ✗
1847	George N. Briggs (W)	John Reed Jr. (W)	John G. Palfrey (W)	no such office	Joseph Barrett (NP)	no such office	40W	208W, 43D, 3Lty, 1KN	Daniel Webster (W)	John Davis (W)	10W	Clay/ Frelinghuysen (W) ✗
1848	George N. Briggs (W)	John Reed Jr. (W)	William B. Calhoun (W)	no such office	Joseph Barrett (NP)	no such office	39W, 1D	191W, 78D, 3Lty, 1?	Daniel Webster (W)	John Davis (W)	10W	Clay/ Frelinghuysen (W) ✗
1849	George N. Briggs (W)	John Reed Jr. (W)	William B. Calhoun (W)	John H. Clifford (W)	Ebenezer Bradbury (W)	David Wilder Jr. (W)	40W	178W, 83Co, 1? (Note: Starting at the 1848 election, the Free Soilers (mostly former members of the Liberty Party) and Democrats in Massachusetts established a formal coalition to contest elections for the General Court and for state offices. The makeup of the members of the coalition in the House in 1849 after the election was 53 Free Soilers and 30 Democrats.)	Daniel Webster (W)	John Davis (W)	8W, 1FS, 1 vac.	Taylor/ Fillmore (W) ✓
1850	George N. Briggs (W)	John Reed Jr. (W)	William B. Calhoun (W)	John H. Clifford (W)	Ebenezer Bradbury (W)	David Wilder Jr. (W)	27W, 13Co (Note: The makeup of the members of the minority coalition in the Senate in 1850 after the election was 7 Free Soilers and 6 Democrats.)	168W, 129Co, 1? (Note: The makeup of the members of the minority coalition in the House in 1850 after the election was 56 Democrats, 42 Free Soilers, and 32 Free Soil Democrats.)	Daniel Webster (W)	John Davis (W)	8W, 1FS, 1 vac.	Taylor/ Fillmore (W) ✓
1850	George N. Briggs (W)	John Reed Jr. (W)	William B. Calhoun (W)	John H. Clifford (W)	Ebenezer Bradbury (W)	David Wilder Jr. (W)	27W, 13Co	168W, 129Co, 1?	Robert C. Winthrop (W)	John Davis (W)	8W, 1FS, 1 vac.	Taylor/ Fillmore (W) ✓
1851	George S. Boutwell (D)	Henry W. Cushman (D)	Amasa Walker (W)	John H. Clifford (W)	Charles B. Hall (NP)	David Wilder Jr. (W)	26Co, 14W (Note: The makeup of the members of the majority coalition in the Senate in 1851 after the election was 15 Democrats and 11 Free Soilers.)	218Co, 183W (Note: The makeup of the members of the majority coalition in the House in 1851 after the election was 110 Democrats, 98 Free Soilers, and 10 Free Soil Democrats.)	Robert Rantoul Jr. (D)	John Davis (W)	7W, 2FS, 1D	Taylor/ Fillmore (W) ✓
1851	George S. Boutwell (D)	Henry W. Cushman (D)	Amasa Walker (W)	John H. Clifford (W)	Charles B. Hall (NP)	David Wilder Jr. (W)	26Co, 14W	218Co, 183W	Charles Sumner (FS)	John Davis (W)	7W, 2FS, 1D	Taylor/ Fillmore (W) ✓
1852	George S. Boutwell (D)	Henry W. Cushman (D)	Amasa Walker (W)	John H. Clifford (W)	Charles B. Hall (NP)	David Wilder Jr. (W)	28Co, 12W (Note: The makeup of the members of the majority coalition in the Senate in 1852 after the election was 15 Democrats and 13 Free Soilers.)	208Co, 194W (Note: The makeup of the members of the majority coalition in the House in 1852 after the election was 118 Democrats and 90 Free Soilers.)	Charles Sumner (FS)	John Davis (W)	7W, 2FS, 1D	Taylor/ Fillmore (W) ✓
1853	John H. Clifford (W)	Elisha Huntington (W)	Ephraim M. Wright (W)	Rufus Choate (W)	Jacob H. Loud (W)	David Wilder Jr. (W)	32W, 8Co (Note: The makeup of the members of the minority coalition in the Senate in 1853 after the election was 4 Democrats and 4 Free Soilers.)	151W, 137Co (Note: The makeup of the members of the minority coalition in the House in 1853 after the election was 83 Democrats and 54 Free Soilers.)	Charles Sumner (FS)	Edward Everett (W)	9W, 1FS, 1D	Scott/ Graham (W) ✗
1854	Emory Washburn (W)	William C. Plunkett (W)	Ephraim M. Wright (W)	John H. Clifford (W)	Jacob H. Loud (W)	Joseph Mitchell (NP)	30W, 10Co (Note: The makeup of the members of the minority coalition in the Senate in 1854 after the election was 6 Democrats and 4 Free Soilers.)	198W, 112Co (Note: The makeup of the members of the minority coalition in the House in 1854 after the election was 64 Democrats and 48 Free Soilers.)	Charles Sumner (FS)	Edward Everett (W)	9W, 1FS, 1D	Scott/ Graham (W) ✗
1854	Emory Washburn (W)	William C. Plunkett (W)	Ephraim M. Wright (W)	John H. Clifford (W)	Jacob H. Loud (W)	Joseph Mitchell (NP)	30W, 10Co	198W, 112Co	Charles Sumner (FS)	Julius Rockwell (W)	9W, 1FS, 1D	Scott/ Graham (W) ✗
1855	Henry Gardner (KN)	Simon Brown (KN)	Ephraim M. Wright (W)	John H. Clifford (W)	Thomas J. Marsh (NP)	Stephen N. Gifford (W)	40KN	376KN, 1D, 1R, 1W, 1?	Charles Sumner (FS)	Henry Wilson (FS)	11KN	Scott/ Graham (W) ✗
1856	Henry Gardner (KN)	Henry W. Benchley (KN)	Francis DeWitt (KN)	John H. Clifford (W)	Moses Tenney Jr. (KN)	Chandler R. Ransom (NP)	29KN, 9R, 2D	168KN, 68R, 58W, 34D, 1Lib	Charles Sumner (FS)	Henry Wilson (R)	11KN	Scott/ Graham (W) ✗
1857	Henry Gardner (KN)	Henry W. Benchley (KN)	Francis DeWitt (KN)	John H. Clifford (W)	Moses Tenney Jr. (KN)	Chandler R. Ransom (NP)	23R, 17KN	314R, 27KN, 8D, 4W, 2?	Charles Sumner (R)	Henry Wilson (R)	11R	Frémont/ Dayton (R) ✗
1858	Nathaniel P. Banks (R)	Eliphalet Trask (R)	Oliver Warner (R)	Stephen Henry Phillips (Note: First elected attorney general (position was previously appointed).) (R)	Moses Tenney Jr. (KN)	Charles White (NP)	33R, 4KN, 2D, 1W	169R, 41D, 29KN, 1Cit	Charles Sumner (R)	Henry Wilson (R)	11R	Frémont/ Dayton (R) ✗
1859	Nathaniel P. Banks (R)	Eliphalet Trask (R)	Oliver Warner (R)	Stephen Henry Phillips (R)	Moses Tenney Jr. (KN)	Charles White (NP)	37R, 3D	197R, 29D, 10KN, 4?	Charles Sumner (R)	Henry Wilson (R)	11R	Frémont/ Dayton (R) ✗
1860	Nathaniel P. Banks (R)	Eliphalet Trask (R)	Oliver Warner (R)	Stephen Henry Phillips (R)	Moses Tenney Jr. (KN)	Charles White (NP)	34R, 6D	183R, 50D, 6KN, 1?	Charles Sumner (R)	Henry Wilson (R)	11R	Frémont/ Dayton (R) ✗
1861	John Albion Andrew (R)	John Z. Goodrich (R)	Oliver Warner (R)	Dwight Foster (R)	Henry K. Oliver (R)	Levi Reed (R)	28R, 8U, 4D	223R, 15D, 2NR	Charles Sumner (R)	Henry Wilson (R)	10R, 1CU	Lincoln/ Hamlin (R) ✓
1862	John Albion Andrew (R)	John Nesmith (R)	Oliver Warner (R)	Dwight Foster (R)	Henry K. Oliver (R)	Levi Reed (R)	31R, 6D, 3U	156R, 45U, 24D, 4?	Charles Sumner (R)	Henry Wilson (R)	9R, 2U	Lincoln/ Hamlin (R) ✓
1863	John Albion Andrew (R)	Joel Hayden (R)	Oliver Warner (R)	Dwight Foster (R)	Henry K. Oliver (R)	Levi Reed (R)	35R, 5D	198R, 41D, 1?	Charles Sumner (R)	Henry Wilson (R)	10R	Lincoln/ Hamlin (R) ✓
1864	John Albion Andrew (R)	Joel Hayden (R)	Oliver Warner (R)	Chester I. Reed (R)	Henry K. Oliver (R)	Levi Reed (R)	40R	228R, 12D	Charles Sumner (R)	Henry Wilson (R)	10R	Lincoln/ Hamlin (R) ✓
1865	John Albion Andrew (R)	Joel Hayden (R)	Oliver Warner (R)	Chester I. Reed (R)	Henry K. Oliver (R)	Julius L. Clarke (R)	40R	234R, 6D	Charles Sumner (R)	Henry Wilson (R)	10R	Lincoln/ Johnson (NU) ✓
1866	Alexander Bullock (R)	William Claflin (R)	Oliver Warner (R)	Chester I. Reed (R)	Jacob H. Loud (R)	Henry Shaw Briggs (R)	39R, 1D	221R, 19D	Charles Sumner (R)	Henry Wilson (R)	10R	Lincoln/ Johnson (NU) ✓
1867	Alexander Bullock (R)	William Claflin (R)	Oliver Warner (R)	Charles Allen (R)	Jacob H. Loud (R)	Henry Shaw Briggs (R)	40R	229R, 11D	Charles Sumner (R)	Henry Wilson (R)	10R	Lincoln/ Johnson (NU) ✓
1868	Alexander Bullock (R)	William Claflin (R)	Oliver Warner (R)	Charles Allen (R)	Jacob H. Loud (R)	Henry Shaw Briggs (R)	32R, 8D	180R, 60D	Charles Sumner (R)	Henry Wilson (R)	10R	Lincoln/ Johnson (NU) ✓
1869	William Claflin (R)	Joseph Tucker (R)	Oliver Warner (R)	Charles Allen (R)	Jacob H. Loud (R)	Henry Shaw Briggs (R)	38R, 2D	224R, 16D	Charles Sumner (R)	Henry Wilson (R)	10R	Grant/ Colfax (R) ✓
1870	William Claflin (R)	Joseph Tucker (R)	Oliver Warner (R)	Charles Allen (R)	Jacob H. Loud (R)	Henry Shaw Briggs (R)	29R, 10D, 1LR	160R, 58D, 11LR	Charles Sumner (R)	Henry Wilson (R)	10R	Grant/ Colfax (R) ✓
1871	William Claflin (R)	Joseph Tucker (R)	Oliver Warner (R)	Charles Allen (R)	Charles Adams Jr. (R)	Charles Endicott (R)	34R, 5D, 1LR	195R, 34D, 1 vac.	Charles Sumner (R)	Henry Wilson (R)	10R	Grant/ Colfax (R) ✓
1872	William B. Washburn (R)	Joseph Tucker (R)	Oliver Warner (R)	Charles R. Train (R)	Charles Adams Jr. (R)	Charles Endicott (R)	35R, 5D-LR	179R, 55D-LR, 9?	Charles Sumner (R)	Henry Wilson (R)	10R	Grant/ Colfax (R) ✓
1873	William B. Washburn (R)	Thomas Talbot (R)	Oliver Warner (R)	Charles R. Train (R)	Charles Adams Jr. (R)	Charles Endicott (R)	39R, 1D	211R, 24D, 5 vac.	Charles Sumner (LR)	George S. Boutwell (R)	11R	Grant/ Wilson (R) ✓
1874	vacant	Thomas Talbot (R)	Oliver Warner (R)	Charles R. Train (R)	Charles Adams Jr. (R)	Charles Endicott (R)	25R, 11D, 4I	168R, 70D, 2I	William B. Washburn (R)	George S. Boutwell (R)	11R	Grant/ Wilson (R) ✓
1875	William Gaston (D)	Horatio G. Knight (R)	Oliver Warner (R)	Charles R. Train (R)	Charles Adams Jr. (R)	Charles Endicott (R)	24R, 15D, 1I	155R, 79D, 6I	Henry L. Dawes (R)	George S. Boutwell (R)	5R, 4D, 2I	Grant/ Wilson (R) ✓
1876	Alexander H. Rice (R)	Horatio G. Knight (R)	Henry B. Pierce (R)	Charles R. Train (R)	Charles Endicott (R)	Julius L. Clarke (R)	30R, 9D, 1I	182R, 58D	Henry L. Dawes (R)	George S. Boutwell (R)	5D, 4R, 2I	Grant/ Wilson (R) ✓
1877	Alexander H. Rice (R)	Horatio G. Knight (R)	Henry B. Pierce (R)	Charles R. Train (R)	Charles Endicott (R)	Julius L. Clarke (R)	33R, 7D	178R, 62D	Henry L. Dawes (R)	George F. Hoar (R)	10R, 1D	Hayes/ Wheeler (R) ✓
1878	Alexander H. Rice (R)	Horatio G. Knight (R)	Henry B. Pierce (R)	Charles R. Train (R)	Charles Endicott (R)	Julius L. Clarke (R)	35R, 5D	171R, 69D	Henry L. Dawes (R)	George F. Hoar (R)	9R, 2D	Hayes/ Wheeler (R) ✓
1879	Thomas Talbot (R)	John Davis Long (R)	Henry B. Pierce (R)	George Marston (R)	Charles Endicott (R)	Charles R. Ladd (R)	35R, 5D	178R, 48D, 11GB, 3I	Henry L. Dawes (R)	George F. Hoar (R)	10R, 1D	Hayes/ Wheeler (R) ✓
1880	John Davis Long (R)	Byron Weston (R)	Henry B. Pierce (R)	George Marston (R)	Charles Endicott (R)	Charles R. Ladd (R)	32R, 5D, 3?	175R, 48D, 12I, 5GB	Henry L. Dawes (R)	George F. Hoar (R)	10R, 1D	Hayes/ Wheeler (R) ✓
1881	John Davis Long (R)	Byron Weston (R)	Henry B. Pierce (R)	George Marston (R)	Daniel A. Gleason (R)	Charles R. Ladd (R)	35R, 5D	191R, 47D, 2GB	Henry L. Dawes (R)	George F. Hoar (R)	10R, 1D	Garfield/ Arthur (R) ✓
1882	John Davis Long (R)	Byron Weston (R)	Henry B. Pierce (R)	George Marston (R)	Daniel A. Gleason (R)	Charles R. Ladd (R)	36R, 4D	179R, 53D, 5IR, 2I, 1ID	Henry L. Dawes (R)	George F. Hoar (R)	10R, 1D	Garfield/ Arthur (R) ✓
1883	Benjamin Butler (D)	Oliver Ames (R)	Henry B. Pierce (R)	Edgar J. Sherman (R)	Daniel A. Gleason (R)	Charles R. Ladd (R)	22R, 18D	151R, 84D, 4I, 1Nat	Henry L. Dawes (R)	George F. Hoar (R)	8R, 4D	Garfield/ Arthur (R) ✓
1884	George D. Robinson (R)	Oliver Ames (R)	Henry B. Pierce (R)	Edgar J. Sherman (R)	Daniel A. Gleason (R)	Charles R. Ladd (R)	25R, 14D, 1?	137R, 92D, 6I, 3GB, 1IR, 1ID	Henry L. Dawes (R)	George F. Hoar (R)	8R, 4D	Garfield/ Arthur (R) ✓
1885	George D. Robinson (R)	Oliver Ames (R)	Henry B. Pierce (R)	Edgar J. Sherman (R)	Daniel A. Gleason (R)	Charles R. Ladd (R)	34R, 5D, 1IR	164R, 65D, 3Pop, 1ID, 1?	Henry L. Dawes (R)	George F. Hoar (R)	10R, 2D	Blaine/ Logan (R) ✗
1886	George D. Robinson (R)	Oliver Ames (R)	Henry B. Pierce (R)	Edgar J. Sherman (R)	Alanson W. Beard (R)	Charles R. Ladd (R)	28R, 11D, 1?	157R, 75D, 8I	Henry L. Dawes (R)	George F. Hoar (R)	10R, 2D	Blaine/ Logan (R) ✗
1887	Oliver Ames (R)	John Q. A. Brackett (R)	Henry B. Pierce (R)	Andrew J. Waterman (R)	Alanson W. Beard (R)	Charles R. Ladd (R)	25R, 15D	158R, 78D, 3ID, 1I, 1IR, 1?	Henry L. Dawes (R)	George F. Hoar (R)	8R, 4D	Blaine/ Logan (R) ✗
1888	Oliver Ames (R)	John Q. A. Brackett (R)	Henry B. Pierce (R)	Andrew J. Waterman (R)	Alanson W. Beard (R)	Charles R. Ladd (R)	30R, 10D	164R, 71D, 3I, 1ID, 1IR	Henry L. Dawes (R)	George F. Hoar (R)	8R, 4D	Blaine/ Logan (R) ✗
1889	Oliver Ames (R)	John Q. A. Brackett (R)	Henry B. Pierce (R)	Andrew J. Waterman (R)	George A. Marden (R)	Charles R. Ladd (R)	33R, 7D	181R, 58D, 1ID	Henry L. Dawes (R)	George F. Hoar (R)	10R, 2D	Harrison/ Morton (R) ✓
1890	John Q. A. Brackett (R)	William H. Haile (R)	Henry B. Pierce (R)	Andrew J. Waterman (R)	George A. Marden (R)	Charles R. Ladd (R)	29R, 11D	161R, 79D	Henry L. Dawes (R)	George F. Hoar (R)	10R, 2D	Harrison/ Morton (R) ✓
1891	William E. Russell (D)	William H. Haile (R)	William M. Olin (R)	Albert E. Pillsbury (R)	George A. Marden (R)	William D. T. Trefry (D)	20R, 20D (Note: After a tied vote on the first ballot, the Democrats negotiated an agreement to give the Republicans, led by Henry H. Sprague, the Senate Presidency pro tempore in exchange for an even division of all committees.)	140R, 98D, 1I, 1Proh	Henry L. Dawes (R)	George F. Hoar (R)	7D, 5R	Harrison/ Morton (R) ✓
1892	William E. Russell (D)	William H. Haile (R)	William M. Olin (R)	Albert E. Pillsbury (R)	George A. Marden (R)	John W. Kimball (R)	25R, 14D, 1I	149R, 90D, 1Proh	Henry L. Dawes (R)	George F. Hoar (R)	7D, 5R	Harrison/ Morton (R) ✓
1893	William E. Russell (D)	Roger Wolcott (R)	William M. Olin (R)	Albert E. Pillsbury (R)	George A. Marden (R)	John W. Kimball (R)	30R, 10D	166R, 73D, 1Lab-ID	Henry Cabot Lodge (R)	George F. Hoar (R)	9R, 4D	Harrison/ Reid (R) ✗
1894	Frederic T. Greenhalge (R)	Roger Wolcott (R)	William M. Olin (R)	Hosea M. Knowlton (R)	Henry M. Phillips (R)	John W. Kimball (R)	33R, 7D	183R, 56D, 1I	Henry Cabot Lodge (R)	George F. Hoar (R)	9R, 4D	Harrison/ Reid (R) ✗
1895	Frederic T. Greenhalge (R)	Roger Wolcott (R)	William M. Olin (R)	Hosea M. Knowlton (R)	Edward P. Shaw (R)	John W. Kimball (R)	36R, 4D	194R, 46D	Henry Cabot Lodge (R)	George F. Hoar (R)	12R, 1D	Harrison/ Reid (R) ✗
1896	Frederic T. Greenhalge (R)	Roger Wolcott (R)	William M. Olin (R)	Hosea M. Knowlton (R)	Edward P. Shaw (R)	John W. Kimball (R)	33R, 7D	182R, 58D	Henry Cabot Lodge (R)	George F. Hoar (R)	12R, 1D	Harrison/ Reid (R) ✗
1896	vacant	Roger Wolcott (R)	William M. Olin (R)	Hosea M. Knowlton (R)	Edward P. Shaw (R)	John W. Kimball (R)	33R, 7D	182R, 58D	Henry Cabot Lodge (R)	George F. Hoar (R)	12R, 1D	Harrison/ Reid (R) ✗
1897	Roger Wolcott (R)	Winthrop M. Crane (R)	William M. Olin (R)	Hosea M. Knowlton (R)	Edward P. Shaw (R)	John W. Kimball (R)	35R, 5D	202R, 38D	Henry Cabot Lodge (R)	George F. Hoar (R)	12R, 1D	McKinley/ Hobart (R) ✓
1898	Roger Wolcott (R)	Winthrop M. Crane (R)	William M. Olin (R)	Hosea M. Knowlton (R)	Edward P. Shaw (R)	John W. Kimball (R)	33R, 7D	181R, 57D, 1Proh, 1I	Henry Cabot Lodge (R)	George F. Hoar (R)	12R, 1D	McKinley/ Hobart (R) ✓
1899	Roger Wolcott (R)	Winthrop M. Crane (R)	William M. Olin (R)	Hosea M. Knowlton (R)	Edward P. Shaw (R)	John W. Kimball (R)	33R, 7D	168R, 64D, 2IC, 2I, 1ID, 1Proh, 1RC	Henry Cabot Lodge (R)	George F. Hoar (R)	10R, 3D	McKinley/ Hobart (R) ✓
1900	Winthrop M. Crane (R)	John L. Bates (R)	William M. Olin (R)	Hosea M. Knowlton (R)	Edward S. Bradford (R)	John W. Kimball (R)	31R, 9D	166R, 70D, 2IC, 2SD	Henry Cabot Lodge (R)	George F. Hoar (R)	10R, 3D	McKinley/ Hobart (R) ✓
1901	Winthrop M. Crane (R)	John L. Bates (R)	William M. Olin (R)	Hosea M. Knowlton (R)	Edward S. Bradford (R)	Henry E. Turner (R)	31R, 9D	179R, 58D, 2SD, 1I	Henry Cabot Lodge (R)	George F. Hoar (R)	10R, 3D	McKinley/ Roosevelt (R) ✓
1902	Winthrop M. Crane (R)	John L. Bates (R)	William M. Olin (R)	Herbert Parker (R)	Edward S. Bradford (R)	Henry E. Turner (R)	33R, 7D	159R, 70D, 3IR, 3RC, 2ID, 2SD, 1?	Henry Cabot Lodge (R)	George F. Hoar (R)	10R, 3D	McKinley/ Roosevelt (R) ✓
1903	John L. Bates (R)	Curtis Guild Jr. (R)	William M. Olin (R)	Herbert Parker (R)	Edward S. Bradford (R)	Henry E. Turner (R)	31R, 9D	154R, 83D, 3Soc	Henry Cabot Lodge (R)	George F. Hoar (R)	10R, 4D	McKinley/ Roosevelt (R) ✓
1904	John L. Bates (R)	Curtis Guild Jr. (R)	William M. Olin (R)	Herbert Parker (R)	Edward S. Bradford (R)	Henry E. Turner (R)	31R, 9D	154R, 85D, 1Soc	Henry Cabot Lodge (R)	George F. Hoar (R)	10R, 4D	McKinley/ Roosevelt (R) ✓
1905	William Lewis Douglas (D)	Curtis Guild Jr. (R)	William M. Olin (R)	Herbert Parker (R)	Arthur Chapin (R)	Henry E. Turner (R)	34R, 6D	169R, 69D, 1I, 1RC	Henry Cabot Lodge (R)	Winthrop M. Crane (R)	11R, 3D	Roosevelt/ Fairbanks (R) ✓
1906	Curtis Guild Jr. (R)	Eben Sumner Draper (R)	William M. Olin (R)	Dana Malone (R)	Arthur Chapin (R)	Henry E. Turner (R)	31R, 9D	165R, 69D, 3RC, 1ID, 1IC	Henry Cabot Lodge (R)	Winthrop M. Crane (R)	11R, 3D	Roosevelt/ Fairbanks (R) ✓
1907	Curtis Guild Jr. (R)	Eben Sumner Draper (R)	William M. Olin (R)	Dana Malone (R)	Arthur Chapin (R)	Henry E. Turner (R)	28R, 12D	173R, 63D, 2IR, 1ID, 1IC	Henry Cabot Lodge (R)	Winthrop M. Crane (R)	11R, 3D	Roosevelt/ Fairbanks (R) ✓
1908	Curtis Guild Jr. (R)	Eben Sumner Draper (R)	William M. Olin (R)	Dana Malone (R)	Arthur Chapin (R)	Henry E. Turner (R)	31R, 9D	175R, 65D	Henry Cabot Lodge (R)	Winthrop M. Crane (R)	11R, 3D	Roosevelt/ Fairbanks (R) ✓
1909	Eben Sumner Draper (R)	Louis A. Frothingham (R)	William M. Olin (R)	Dana Malone (R)	Elmer A. Stevens (R)	Henry E. Turner (R)	34R, 6D (Note: The Massachusetts General Court did not meet for this session.)	180R, 60D	Henry Cabot Lodge (R)	Winthrop M. Crane (R)	9R, 5D	Taft/ Sherman (R) ✓
1910	Eben Sumner Draper (R)	Louis A. Frothingham (R)	William M. Olin (R)	Dana Malone (R)	Elmer A. Stevens (R)	Henry E. Turner (R)	33R, 7D	169R, 69D, 1I, 1Soc	Henry Cabot Lodge (R)	Winthrop M. Crane (R)	9R, 5D	Taft/ Sherman (R) ✓
1911	Eugene Foss (D)	Louis A. Frothingham (R)	Albert P. Langtry (R)	James M. Swift (R)	Elmer A. Stevens (R)	John E. White (R)	26R, 14D	127R, 112D, 1Soc	Henry Cabot Lodge (R)	Winthrop M. Crane (R)	10R, 4D	Taft/ Sherman (R) ✓
1912	Eugene Foss (D)	Robert Luce (R)	Albert P. Langtry (R)	James M. Swift (R)	Elmer A. Stevens (R)	John E. White (R)	26R, 14D	143R, 94D, 2I, 1Soc	Henry Cabot Lodge (R)	Winthrop M. Crane (R)	10R, 4D	Taft/ Sherman (R) ✓
1913	Eugene Foss (D)	David I. Walsh (D)	Frank J. Donahue (D)	James M. Swift (R)	Elmer A. Stevens (R)	John E. White (R)	26R, 14D	139R, 94D, 5Prog, 1I, 1S	Henry Cabot Lodge (R)	John W. Weeks (R)	9R, 7D	Wilson/ Marshall (D) ✓
1914	David I. Walsh (D)	Edward P. Barry (D)	Frank J. Donahue (D)	Thomas J. Boynton (D)	Frederick Mansfield (D)	Frank H. Pope (D)	21R, 17D, 2Prog	118R, 104D, 17Prog, 1S	Henry Cabot Lodge (R)	John W. Weeks (R)	8R, 8D	Wilson/ Marshall (D) ✓
1915	David I. Walsh (D)	Grafton D. Cushing (R)	Albert P. Langtry (R)	Henry Converse Atwill (R)	Charles L. Burrill (R)	Alonzo B. Cook (R)	28R, 12D	150R, 90D	Henry Cabot Lodge (R)	John W. Weeks (R)	13R, 3D	Wilson/ Marshall (D) ✓
1916	Samuel W. McCall (R)	Calvin Coolidge (R)	Albert P. Langtry (R)	Henry Converse Atwill (R)	Charles L. Burrill (R)	Alonzo B. Cook (R)	34R, 6D	168R, 72D	Henry Cabot Lodge (R)	John W. Weeks (R)	13R, 3D	Wilson/ Marshall (D) ✓
1917	Samuel W. McCall (R)	Calvin Coolidge (R)	Albert P. Langtry (R)	Henry Converse Atwill (R)	Charles L. Burrill (R)	Alonzo B. Cook (R)	34R, 5D, 1LD	175R, 65D	Henry Cabot Lodge (R)	John W. Weeks (R)	13R, 3D	Hughes/ Fairbanks (R) ✗
1918	Samuel W. McCall (R)	Calvin Coolidge (R)	Albert P. Langtry (R)	Henry Converse Atwill (R)	Charles L. Burrill (R)	Alonzo B. Cook (R)	33R, 7D	179R, 61D	Henry Cabot Lodge (R)	John W. Weeks (R)	13R, 3D	Hughes/ Fairbanks (R) ✗
1919	Calvin Coolidge (R)	Channing H. Cox (R)	Albert P. Langtry (R)	vacant	Charles L. Burrill (R)	Alonzo B. Cook (R)	30R, 10D	182R, 58D	Henry Cabot Lodge (R)	David I. Walsh (D)	13R, 3D	Hughes/ Fairbanks (R) ✗
1920	Calvin Coolidge (R)	Channing H. Cox (R)	Albert P. Langtry (R)	J. Weston Allen (R)	Fred J. Burrell (R)	Alonzo B. Cook (R)	33R, 7D	176R, 64D	Henry Cabot Lodge (R)	David I. Walsh (D)	13R, 3D	Hughes/ Fairbanks (R) ✗
1921	Channing H. Cox (R)	Alvan T. Fuller (R)	J. Weston Allen (R)	Frederic W. Cook (R)	James Jackson (R)	Alonzo B. Cook (R)	35R, 5D	188R, 52D	Henry Cabot Lodge (R)	David I. Walsh (D)	14R, 2D	Harding/ Coolidge (R) ✓
1922	Channing H. Cox (R)	Alvan T. Fuller (R)	J. Weston Allen (R)	Frederic W. Cook (R)	James Jackson (R)	Alonzo B. Cook (R)	35R, 5D	188R, 52D	Henry Cabot Lodge (R)	David I. Walsh (D)	14R, 2D	Harding/ Coolidge (R) ✓
1923	Channing H. Cox (R)	Alvan T. Fuller (R)	Frederic W. Cook (R)	Jay R. Benton (R)	James Jackson (R)	Alonzo B. Cook (R)	33R, 7D	160R, 80D	Henry Cabot Lodge (R)	David I. Walsh (D)	13R, 3D	Harding/ Coolidge (R) ✓
1924	Channing H. Cox (R)	Alvan T. Fuller (R)	Frederic W. Cook (R)	Jay R. Benton (R)	William S. Youngman (R)	Alonzo B. Cook (R)	33R, 7D	160R, 80D	Henry Cabot Lodge (R)	David I. Walsh (D)	13R, 3D	Harding/ Coolidge (R) ✓
1925	Alvan T. Fuller (R)	Frank G. Allen (R)	Frederic W. Cook (R)	Jay R. Benton (R)	William S. Youngman (R)	Alonzo B. Cook (R)	34R, 6D	170R, 70D	William M. Butler (R)	Frederick H. Gillett (R)	13R, 3D	Coolidge/ Dawes (R) ✓
1926	Alvan T. Fuller (R)	Frank G. Allen (R)	Frederic W. Cook (R)	Jay R. Benton (R)	William S. Youngman (R)	Alonzo B. Cook (R)	34R, 6D	170R, 70D	William M. Butler (R)	Frederick H. Gillett (R)	13R, 3D	Coolidge/ Dawes (R) ✓
1927	Alvan T. Fuller (R)	Frank G. Allen (R)	Frederic W. Cook (R)	Arthur Kenneth Reading (R)	William S. Youngman (R)	Alonzo B. Cook (R)	35R, 5D	177R, 63D	David I. Walsh (D)	Frederick H. Gillett (R)	13R, 3D	Coolidge/ Dawes (R) ✓
1928	Alvan T. Fuller (R)	Frank G. Allen (R)	Frederic W. Cook (R)	Joseph E. Warner (R)	John W. Haigis (R)	Alonzo B. Cook (R)	35R, 5D	177R, 63D	David I. Walsh (D)	Frederick H. Gillett (R)	13R, 3D	Coolidge/ Dawes (R) ✓
1929	Frank G. Allen (R)	William S. Youngman (R)	Frederic W. Cook (R)	Joseph E. Warner (R)	John W. Haigis (R)	Alonzo B. Cook (R)	31R, 9D	157R, 83D	David I. Walsh (D)	Frederick H. Gillett (R)	13R, 3D	Smith/ Robinson (D) ✗
1930	Frank G. Allen (R)	William S. Youngman (R)	Frederic W. Cook (R)	Joseph E. Warner (R)	vacant	Alonzo B. Cook (R)	31R, 9D	157R, 83D	David I. Walsh (D)	Frederick H. Gillett (R)	13R, 3D	Smith/ Robinson (D) ✗
1931	Joseph B. Ely (D)	William S. Youngman (R)	Frederic W. Cook (R)	Joseph E. Warner (R)	Charles F. Hurley (D)	Francis X. Hurley (D)	30R, 10D	141R, 99D	David I. Walsh (D)	Marcus A. Coolidge (D)	12R, 4D	Smith/ Robinson (D) ✗
1932	Joseph B. Ely (D)	William S. Youngman (R)	Frederic W. Cook (R)	Joseph E. Warner (R)	Charles F. Hurley (D)	Francis X. Hurley (D)	30R, 10D	141R, 99D	David I. Walsh (D)	Marcus A. Coolidge (D)	12R, 4D	Smith/ Robinson (D) ✗
1933	Joseph B. Ely (D)	Gaspar G. Bacon (R)	Frederic W. Cook (R)	Joseph E. Warner (R)	Charles F. Hurley (D)	Francis X. Hurley (D)	26R, 14D	147R, 93D	David I. Walsh (D)	Marcus A. Coolidge (D)	10R, 5D	Roosevelt/ Garner (D) ✓
1934	Joseph B. Ely (D)	Gaspar G. Bacon (R)	Frederic W. Cook (R)	Joseph E. Warner (R)	Charles F. Hurley (D)	Francis X. Hurley (D)	26R, 14D	147R, 93D	David I. Walsh (D)	Marcus A. Coolidge (D)	10R, 5D	Roosevelt/ Garner (D) ✓
1935	James Michael Curley (D)	Joseph L. Hurley (D)	Frederic W. Cook (R)	Paul A. Dever (D)	Charles F. Hurley (D)	Thomas H. Buckley (D)	21R, 19D	124R, 116D	David I. Walsh (D)	Marcus A. Coolidge (D)	8R, 7D	Roosevelt/ Garner (D) ✓
1936	James Michael Curley (D)	Joseph L. Hurley (D)	Frederic W. Cook (R)	Paul A. Dever (D)	Charles F. Hurley (D)	Thomas H. Buckley (D)	21R, 19D	124R, 116D	David I. Walsh (D)	Marcus A. Coolidge (D)	8R, 7D	Roosevelt/ Garner (D) ✓
1937	Charles F. Hurley (D)	Francis E. Kelly (D)	Frederic W. Cook (R)	Paul A. Dever (D)	William E. Hurley (R)	Thomas H. Buckley (D)	26R, 14D	136R, 104D	David I. Walsh (D)	Henry Cabot Lodge Jr. (R)	10R, 5D	Roosevelt/ Garner (D) ✓
1938	Charles F. Hurley (D)	Francis E. Kelly (D)	Frederic W. Cook (R)	Paul A. Dever (D)	William E. Hurley (R)	Thomas H. Buckley (D)	26R, 14D	136R, 104D	David I. Walsh (D)	Henry Cabot Lodge Jr. (R)	10R, 5D	Roosevelt/ Garner (D) ✓
1939	Leverett Saltonstall (R)	Horace T. Cahill (R)	Frederic W. Cook (R)	Paul A. Dever (D)	William E. Hurley (R)	Thomas H. Buckley (D)	28R, 12D	143R, 97D	David I. Walsh (D)	Henry Cabot Lodge Jr. (R)	10R, 5D	Roosevelt/ Garner (D) ✓
1940	Leverett Saltonstall (R)	Horace T. Cahill (R)	Frederic W. Cook (R)	Paul A. Dever (D)	William E. Hurley (R)	Thomas H. Buckley (D)	28R, 12D	143R, 97D	David I. Walsh (D)	Henry Cabot Lodge Jr. (R)	10R, 5D	Roosevelt/ Garner (D) ✓
1941	Leverett Saltonstall (R)	Horace T. Cahill (R)	Frederic W. Cook (R)	Robert T. Bushnell (R)	William E. Hurley (R)	Thomas J. Buckley (D)	25R, 15D	143R, 97D	David I. Walsh (D)	Henry Cabot Lodge Jr. (R)	9R, 6D	Roosevelt/ Wallace (D) ✓
1942	Leverett Saltonstall (R)	Horace T. Cahill (R)	Frederic W. Cook (R)	Robert T. Bushnell (R)	William E. Hurley (R)	Thomas J. Buckley (D)	25R, 15D	143R, 97D	David I. Walsh (D)	Henry Cabot Lodge Jr. (R)	9R, 6D	Roosevelt/ Wallace (D) ✓
1943	Leverett Saltonstall (R)	Horace T. Cahill (R)	Frederic W. Cook (R)	Robert T. Bushnell (R)	Francis X. Hurley (D)	Thomas J. Buckley (D)	26R, 14D	143R, 97D	David I. Walsh (D)	Henry Cabot Lodge Jr. (R)	10R, 4D	Roosevelt/ Wallace (D) ✓
1944	Leverett Saltonstall (R)	Horace T. Cahill (R)	Frederic W. Cook (R)	Robert T. Bushnell (R)	Francis X. Hurley (D)	Thomas J. Buckley (D)	26R, 14D	143R, 97D	David I. Walsh (D)	Sinclair Weeks (R)	10R, 4D	Roosevelt/ Wallace (D) ✓
1945	Maurice J. Tobin (D)	Robert F. Bradford (R)	Frederic W. Cook (R)	Clarence A. Barnes (R)	John E. Hurley (D)	Thomas J. Buckley (D)	23R, 17D	138R, 102D	David I. Walsh (D)	Leverett Saltonstall (R)	10R, 4D	Roosevelt/ Truman (D) ✓
1946	Maurice J. Tobin (D)	Robert F. Bradford (R)	Frederic W. Cook (R)	Clarence A. Barnes (R)	John E. Hurley (D)	Thomas J. Buckley (D)	23R, 17D	138R, 102D	David I. Walsh (D)	Leverett Saltonstall (R)	10R, 4D	Roosevelt/ Truman (D) ✓
1947	Robert F. Bradford (R)	Arthur W. Coolidge (R)	Frederic W. Cook (R)	Clarence A. Barnes (R)	Laurence Curtis (R)	Thomas J. Buckley (D)	24R, 16D	144R, 96D	Henry Cabot Lodge Jr. (R)	Leverett Saltonstall (R)	9R, 5D	Roosevelt/ Truman (D) ✓
1948	Robert F. Bradford (R)	Arthur W. Coolidge (R)	Frederic W. Cook (R)	Clarence A. Barnes (R)	Laurence Curtis (R)	Thomas J. Buckley (D)	24R, 16D	144R, 96D	Henry Cabot Lodge Jr. (R)	Leverett Saltonstall (R)	9R, 5D	Roosevelt/ Truman (D) ✓
1949	Paul A. Dever (D)	Charles F. Sullivan (D)	Edward J. Cronin (D)	Francis E. Kelly (D)	John E. Hurley (D)	Thomas J. Buckley (D)	20R, 20D (Note: After 114 ballots, an agreement was negotiated, with Democrats led by Chester A. Dolan Jr. receiving the Presidency for 1949, while Republicans led by Harris S. Richardson receiving it in 1950. Additionally, the Democrats received the majority on the Ways and Means Committee while all Republican-appointed employees of the Senate retained their jobs.)	122D, 118R	Henry Cabot Lodge Jr. (R)	Leverett Saltonstall (R)	8R, 6D	Truman/ Barkley (D) ✓
1950	Paul A. Dever (D)	Charles F. Sullivan (D)	Edward J. Cronin (D)	Francis E. Kelly (D)	John E. Hurley (D)	Thomas J. Buckley (D)	20R, 20D	122D, 118R	Henry Cabot Lodge Jr. (R)	Leverett Saltonstall (R)	8R, 6D	Truman/ Barkley (D) ✓
1951	Paul A. Dever (D)	Charles F. Sullivan (D)	Edward J. Cronin (D)	Francis E. Kelly (D)	John E. Hurley (D)	Thomas J. Buckley (D)	22R, 18D	124D, 116R	Henry Cabot Lodge Jr. (R)	Leverett Saltonstall (R)	8R, 6D	Truman/ Barkley (D) ✓
1952	Paul A. Dever (D)	Charles F. Sullivan (D)	Edward J. Cronin (D)	Francis E. Kelly (D)	Foster Furcolo (D)	Thomas J. Buckley (D)	22R, 18D	124D, 116R	Henry Cabot Lodge Jr. (R)	Leverett Saltonstall (R)	8R, 6D	Truman/ Barkley (D) ✓
1953	Christian Herter (R)	Sumner G. Whittier (R)	Edward J. Cronin (D)	George Fingold (R)	Foster Furcolo (D)	Thomas J. Buckley (D)	25R, 15D	123R, 117D	John F. Kennedy (D)	Leverett Saltonstall (R)	8R, 6D	Eisenhower/ Nixon (R) ✓
1954	Christian Herter (R)	Sumner G. Whittier (R)	Edward J. Cronin (D)	George Fingold (R)	Foster Furcolo (D)	Thomas J. Buckley (D)	25R, 15D	123R, 117D	John F. Kennedy (D)	Leverett Saltonstall (R)	8R, 6D	Eisenhower/ Nixon (R) ✓
1955	Christian Herter (R)	Sumner G. Whittier (R)	Edward J. Cronin (D)	George Fingold (R)	John Francis Kennedy (D)	Thomas J. Buckley (D)	21R, 19D	128D, 112R	John F. Kennedy (D)	Leverett Saltonstall (R)	7R, 7D	Eisenhower/ Nixon (R) ✓
1956	Christian Herter (R)	Sumner G. Whittier (R)	Edward J. Cronin (D)	George Fingold (R)	John Francis Kennedy (D)	Thomas J. Buckley (D)	21R, 19D	128D, 112R	John F. Kennedy (D)	Leverett Saltonstall (R)	7R, 7D	Eisenhower/ Nixon (R) ✓
1957	Foster Furcolo (D)	Robert F. Murphy (D)	Edward J. Cronin (D)	George Fingold (R)	John Francis Kennedy (D)	Thomas J. Buckley (D)	21R, 19D	132D, 108R	John F. Kennedy (D)	Leverett Saltonstall (R)	7R, 7D	Eisenhower/ Nixon (R) ✓
1958	Foster Furcolo (D)	Robert F. Murphy (D)	J. Henry Goguen (D)	vacant	John Francis Kennedy (D)	Thomas J. Buckley (D)	21R, 19D	132D, 108R	John F. Kennedy (D)	Leverett Saltonstall (R)	7R, 7D	Eisenhower/ Nixon (R) ✓
1959	Foster Furcolo (D)	Robert F. Murphy (D)	Joseph D. Ward (D)	Edward J. McCormack Jr. (D)	John Francis Kennedy (D)	Thomas J. Buckley (D)	24D, 16R	145D, 95R	John F. Kennedy (D)	Leverett Saltonstall (R)	8D, 6R	Eisenhower/ Nixon (R) ✓
1960	Foster Furcolo (D)	Robert F. Murphy (D)	Joseph D. Ward (D)	Edward J. McCormack Jr. (D)	John Francis Kennedy (D)	Thomas J. Buckley (D)	24D, 16R	145D, 95R	John F. Kennedy (D)	Leverett Saltonstall (R)	8D, 6R	Eisenhower/ Nixon (R) ✓
1961	John A. Volpe (R)	Edward McLaughlin (D)	Kevin White (D)	Edward J. McCormack Jr. (D)	John T. Driscoll (D)	Thomas J. Buckley (D)	26D, 14R	156D, 84R	Benjamin A. Smith II (D)	Leverett Saltonstall (R)	8D, 6R	Kennedy/ Johnson (D) ✓
1962	John A. Volpe (R)	Edward McLaughlin (D)	Kevin White (D)	Edward J. McCormack Jr. (D)	John T. Driscoll (D)	Thomas J. Buckley (D)	26D, 14R	156D, 84R	Benjamin A. Smith II (D)	Leverett Saltonstall (R)	8D, 6R	Kennedy/ Johnson (D) ✓
1963	Endicott Peabody (D)	Francis Bellotti (D)	Kevin White (D)	Edward Brooke (R)	John T. Driscoll (D)	Thomas J. Buckley (D)	28D, 12R	150D, 90R	Ted Kennedy (D)	Leverett Saltonstall (R)	7D, 5R	Kennedy/ Johnson (D) ✓
1964	Endicott Peabody (D)	Francis Bellotti (D)	Kevin White (D)	Edward Brooke (R)	John T. Driscoll (D)	Thaddeus M. Buczko (D)	28D, 12R	150D, 90R	Ted Kennedy (D)	Leverett Saltonstall (R)	7D, 5R	Kennedy/ Johnson (D) ✓
1965	John A. Volpe (R)	Elliot Richardson (R)	Kevin White (D)	Edward Brooke (R)	Robert Q. Crane (D)	Thaddeus M. Buczko (D)	27D, 13R	170D, 69R, 1I	Ted Kennedy (D)	Leverett Saltonstall (R)	7D, 5R	Johnson/ Humphrey (D) ✓
1966	John A. Volpe (R)	Elliot Richardson (R)	Kevin White (D)	Edward Brooke (R)	Robert Q. Crane (D)	Thaddeus M. Buczko (D)	27D, 13R	170D, 69R, 1I	Ted Kennedy (D)	Leverett Saltonstall (R)	7D, 5R	Johnson/ Humphrey (D) ✓
1967	John A. Volpe (R)	Francis Sargent (R)	John Davoren (D)	Elliot Richardson (R)	Robert Q. Crane (D)	Thaddeus M. Buczko (D)	26D, 14R	168D, 71R, 1I	Ted Kennedy (D)	Edward Brooke (R)	7D, 5R	Johnson/ Humphrey (D) ✓
1968	John A. Volpe (R)	Francis Sargent (R)	John Davoren (D)	Elliot Richardson (R)	Robert Q. Crane (D)	Thaddeus M. Buczko (D)	26D, 14R	168D, 71R, 1I	Ted Kennedy (D)	Edward Brooke (R)	7D, 5R	Johnson/ Humphrey (D) ✓
1969	vacant	Francis Sargent (R)	John Davoren (D)	Robert H. Quinn (D)	Robert Q. Crane (D)	Thaddeus M. Buczko (D)	27D, 13R	172D, 68R	Ted Kennedy (D)	Edward Brooke (R)	8D, 4R	Humphrey/ Muskie (D) ✗
1970	vacant	Francis Sargent (R)	John Davoren (D)	Robert H. Quinn (D)	Robert Q. Crane (D)	Thaddeus M. Buczko (D)	27D, 13R	172D, 68R	Ted Kennedy (D)	Edward Brooke (R)	8D, 4R	Humphrey/ Muskie (D) ✗
1971	Francis Sargent (R)	Donald Dwight (R)	John Davoren (D)	Robert H. Quinn (D)	Robert Q. Crane (D)	Thaddeus M. Buczko (D)	30D, 10R	178D, 62R	Ted Kennedy (D)	Edward Brooke (R)	8D, 4R	Humphrey/ Muskie (D) ✗
1972	Francis Sargent (R)	Donald Dwight (R)	John Davoren (D)	Robert H. Quinn (D)	Robert Q. Crane (D)	Thaddeus M. Buczko (D)	30D, 10R	178D, 62R	Ted Kennedy (D)	Edward Brooke (R)	8D, 4R	Humphrey/ Muskie (D) ✗
1973	Francis Sargent (R)	Donald Dwight (R)	John Davoren (D)	Robert H. Quinn (D)	Robert Q. Crane (D)	Thaddeus M. Buczko (D)	33D, 7R	186D, 52R, 2I	Ted Kennedy (D)	Edward Brooke (R)	9D, 3R	McGovern/ Shriver (D) ✗
1974	Francis Sargent (R)	Donald Dwight (R)	John Davoren (D)	Robert H. Quinn (D)	Robert Q. Crane (D)	Thaddeus M. Buczko (D)	33D, 7R	186D, 52R, 2I	Ted Kennedy (D)	Edward Brooke (R)	9D, 3R	McGovern/ Shriver (D) ✗
1975	Michael Dukakis (D)	Thomas P. O'Neill III (D)	Paul Guzzi (D)	Francis Bellotti (D)	Robert Q. Crane (D)	Thaddeus M. Buczko (D)	33D, 7R	191D, 46R, 3I	Ted Kennedy (D)	Edward Brooke (R)	10D, 2R	McGovern/ Shriver (D) ✗
1976	Michael Dukakis (D)	Thomas P. O'Neill III (D)	Paul Guzzi (D)	Francis Bellotti (D)	Robert Q. Crane (D)	Thaddeus M. Buczko (D)	33D, 7R	191D, 46R, 3I	Ted Kennedy (D)	Edward Brooke (R)	10D, 2R	McGovern/ Shriver (D) ✗
1977	Michael Dukakis (D)	Thomas P. O'Neill III (D)	Paul Guzzi (D)	Francis Bellotti (D)	Robert Q. Crane (D)	Thaddeus M. Buczko (D)	33D, 7R	194D, 43R, 3I	Ted Kennedy (D)	Edward Brooke (R)	10D, 2R	Carter/ Mondale (D) ✓
1978	Michael Dukakis (D)	Thomas P. O'Neill III (D)	Paul Guzzi (D)	Francis Bellotti (D)	Robert Q. Crane (D)	Thaddeus M. Buczko (D)	33D, 7R	194D, 43R, 3I	Ted Kennedy (D)	Edward Brooke (R)	10D, 2R	Carter/ Mondale (D) ✓
1979	Edward J. King (D)	Thomas P. O'Neill III (D)	Michael J. Connolly (D)	Francis Bellotti (D)	Robert Q. Crane (D)	Thaddeus M. Buczko (D)	34D, 6R	129D, 30R, 1I	Ted Kennedy (D)	Paul Tsongas (D)	10D, 2R	Carter/ Mondale (D) ✓
1980	Edward J. King (D)	Thomas P. O'Neill III (D)	Michael J. Connolly (D)	Francis Bellotti (D)	Robert Q. Crane (D)	Thaddeus M. Buczko (D)	34D, 6R	129D, 30R, 1I	Ted Kennedy (D)	Paul Tsongas (D)	10D, 2R	Carter/ Mondale (D) ✓
1981	Edward J. King (D)	Thomas P. O'Neill III (D)	Michael J. Connolly (D)	Francis Bellotti (D)	Robert Q. Crane (D)	John J. Finnegan (D)	32D, 7R, 1I	128D, 31R, 1I	Ted Kennedy (D)	Paul Tsongas (D)	10D, 2R	Reagan/ Bush (R) ✓
1982	Edward J. King (D)	Thomas P. O'Neill III (D)	Michael J. Connolly (D)	Francis Bellotti (D)	Robert Q. Crane (D)	John J. Finnegan (D)	32D, 7R, 1I	128D, 31R, 1I	Ted Kennedy (D)	Paul Tsongas (D)	10D, 2R	Reagan/ Bush (R) ✓
1983	Michael Dukakis (D)	John Kerry (D)	Michael J. Connolly (D)	Francis Bellotti (D)	Robert Q. Crane (D)	John J. Finnegan (D)	32D, 8R	128D, 29R, 3I	Ted Kennedy (D)	Paul Tsongas (D)	10D, 1R	Reagan/ Bush (R) ✓
1984	Michael Dukakis (D)	John Kerry (D)	Michael J. Connolly (D)	Francis Bellotti (D)	Robert Q. Crane (D)	John J. Finnegan (D)	32D, 8R	128D, 29R, 3I	Ted Kennedy (D)	Paul Tsongas (D)	10D, 1R	Reagan/ Bush (R) ✓
1985	Michael Dukakis (D)	vacant	Michael J. Connolly (D)	Francis Bellotti (D)	Robert Q. Crane (D)	John J. Finnegan (D)	32D, 8R	125D, 34R, 1I	Ted Kennedy (D)	John Kerry (D)	10D, 1R	Reagan/ Bush (R) ✓
1986	Michael Dukakis (D)	vacant	Michael J. Connolly (D)	Francis Bellotti (D)	Robert Q. Crane (D)	John J. Finnegan (D)	32D, 8R	125D, 34R, 1I	Ted Kennedy (D)	John Kerry (D)	10D, 1R	Reagan/ Bush (R) ✓
1987	Michael Dukakis (D)	Evelyn Murphy (D)	Michael J. Connolly (D)	James Shannon (D)	Robert Q. Crane (D)	A. Joseph DeNucci (D)	31D, 9R	127D, 33R	Ted Kennedy (D)	John Kerry (D)	10D, 1R	Reagan/ Bush (R) ✓
1988	Michael Dukakis (D)	Evelyn Murphy (D)	Michael J. Connolly (D)	James Shannon (D)	Robert Q. Crane (D)	A. Joseph DeNucci (D)	31D, 9R	127D, 33R	Ted Kennedy (D)	John Kerry (D)	10D, 1R	Reagan/ Bush (R) ✓
1989	Michael Dukakis (D)	Evelyn Murphy (D)	Michael J. Connolly (D)	James Shannon (D)	Robert Q. Crane (D)	A. Joseph DeNucci (D)	32D, 8R	128D, 32R	Ted Kennedy (D)	John Kerry (D)	10D, 1R	Dukakis/ Bentsen (D) ✗
1990	Michael Dukakis (D)	Evelyn Murphy (D)	Michael J. Connolly (D)	James Shannon (D)	Robert Q. Crane (D)	A. Joseph DeNucci (D)	32D, 8R	128D, 32R	Ted Kennedy (D)	John Kerry (D)	10D, 1R	Dukakis/ Bentsen (D) ✗
1991	Bill Weld (R)	Paul Cellucci (R)	Michael J. Connolly (D)	Scott Harshbarger (D)	Joe Malone (R)	A. Joseph DeNucci (D)	24D, 16R	121D, 38R, 1I	Ted Kennedy (D)	John Kerry (D)	11D	Dukakis/ Bentsen (D) ✗
1992	Bill Weld (R)	Paul Cellucci (R)	Michael J. Connolly (D)	Scott Harshbarger (D)	Joe Malone (R)	A. Joseph DeNucci (D)	24D, 15R, 1 vac.	121D, 38R, 1I	Ted Kennedy (D)	John Kerry (D)	11D	Dukakis/ Bentsen (D) ✗
1993	Bill Weld (R)	Paul Cellucci (R)	Michael J. Connolly (D)	Scott Harshbarger (D)	Joe Malone (R)	A. Joseph DeNucci (D)	31D, 9R	124D, 35R, 1I	Ted Kennedy (D)	John Kerry (D)	8D, 2R	Clinton/ Gore (D) ✓
1994	Bill Weld (R)	Paul Cellucci (R)	Michael J. Connolly (D)	Scott Harshbarger (D)	Joe Malone (R)	A. Joseph DeNucci (D)	31D, 9R	124D, 35R, 1I	Ted Kennedy (D)	John Kerry (D)	8D, 2R	Clinton/ Gore (D) ✓
1995	Bill Weld (R)	Paul Cellucci (R)	William F. Galvin (D)	Scott Harshbarger (D)	Joe Malone (R)	A. Joseph DeNucci (D)	30D, 10R	125D, 34R, 1NP	Ted Kennedy (D)	John Kerry (D)	8D, 2R	Clinton/ Gore (D) ✓
1996	Bill Weld (R)	Paul Cellucci (R)	William F. Galvin (D)	Scott Harshbarger (D)	Joe Malone (R)	A. Joseph DeNucci (D)	28D, 10R, 2 vac.	125D, 34R, 1NP	Ted Kennedy (D)	John Kerry (D)	8D, 2R	Clinton/ Gore (D) ✓
1997	Bill Weld (R)	Paul Cellucci (R)	William F. Galvin (D)	Scott Harshbarger (D)	Joe Malone (R)	A. Joseph DeNucci (D)	33D, 7R	124D, 35R, 1I	Ted Kennedy (D)	John Kerry (D)	10D	Clinton/ Gore (D) ✓
1998	vacant	Paul Cellucci (R)	William F. Galvin (D)	Scott Harshbarger (D)	Joe Malone (R)	A. Joseph DeNucci (D)	33D, 7R	124D, 35R, 1I	Ted Kennedy (D)	John Kerry (D)	10D	Clinton/ Gore (D) ✓
1999	Paul Cellucci (R)	Jane Swift (R)	William F. Galvin (D)	Thomas Reilly (D)	Shannon O'Brien (D)	A. Joseph DeNucci (D)	33D, 7R	131D, 28R, 1I	Ted Kennedy (D)	John Kerry (D)	10D	Clinton/ Gore (D) ✓
2000	Paul Cellucci (R)	Jane Swift (R)	William F. Galvin (D)	Thomas Reilly (D)	Shannon O'Brien (D)	A. Joseph DeNucci (D)	33D, 7R	131D, 28R, 1I	Ted Kennedy (D)	John Kerry (D)	10D	Clinton/ Gore (D) ✓
2001	Paul Cellucci (R)	Jane Swift (R)	William F. Galvin (D)	Thomas Reilly (D)	Shannon O'Brien (D)	A. Joseph DeNucci (D)	34D, 6R	137D, 23R	Ted Kennedy (D)	John Kerry (D)	10D	Gore/ Lieberman (D) ✗
2002	vacant	Jane Swift (R)	William F. Galvin (D)	Thomas Reilly (D)	Shannon O'Brien (D)	A. Joseph DeNucci (D)	34D, 6R	137D, 23R	Ted Kennedy (D)	John Kerry (D)	10D	Gore/ Lieberman (D) ✗
2003	Mitt Romney (R)	Kerry Healey (R)	William F. Galvin (D)	Thomas Reilly (D)	Tim Cahill (D)	A. Joseph DeNucci (D)	34D, 6R	135D, 23R, 1I	Ted Kennedy (D)	John Kerry (D)	10D	Gore/ Lieberman (D) ✗
2004	Mitt Romney (R)	Kerry Healey (R)	William F. Galvin (D)	Thomas Reilly (D)	Tim Cahill (D)	A. Joseph DeNucci (D)	33D, 7R (Note: Republican Scott Brown won a special election to succeed Democrat Cheryl Jacques)	135D, 23R, 1I	Ted Kennedy (D)	John Kerry (D)	10D	Gore/ Lieberman (D) ✗
2005	Mitt Romney (R)	Kerry Healey (R)	William F. Galvin (D)	Thomas Reilly (D)	Tim Cahill (D)	A. Joseph DeNucci (D)	34D, 6R	139D, 20R, 1I	Ted Kennedy (D)	John Kerry (D)	10D	Kerry/ Edwards (D) ✗
2006	Mitt Romney (R)	Kerry Healey (R)	William F. Galvin (D)	Thomas Reilly (D)	Tim Cahill (D)	A. Joseph DeNucci (D)	34D, 6R	139D, 20R, 1I	Ted Kennedy (D)	John Kerry (D)	10D	Kerry/ Edwards (D) ✗
2007	Deval Patrick (D)	Tim Murray (D)	William F. Galvin (D)	Martha Coakley (D)	Tim Cahill (D)	A. Joseph DeNucci (D)	35D, 5R	141D, 19R	Ted Kennedy (D)	John Kerry (D)	10D	Kerry/ Edwards (D) ✗
2008	Deval Patrick (D)	Tim Murray (D)	William F. Galvin (D)	Martha Coakley (D)	Tim Cahill (D)	A. Joseph DeNucci (D)	35D, 5R	141D, 19R	Ted Kennedy (D)	John Kerry (D)	10D	Kerry/ Edwards (D) ✗
2009	Deval Patrick (D)	Tim Murray (D)	William F. Galvin (D)	Martha Coakley (D)	Tim Cahill (D)	A. Joseph DeNucci (D)	35D, 5R	144D, 15R, 1I	Ted Kennedy (D)	John Kerry (D)	10D	Obama/ Biden (D) ✓
2009	Deval Patrick (D)	Tim Murray (D)	William F. Galvin (D)	Martha Coakley (D)	Tim Cahill (D)	A. Joseph DeNucci (D)	35D, 5R	144D, 15R, 1I	Paul G. Kirk (D)	John Kerry (D)	10D	Obama/ Biden (D) ✓
2010	Deval Patrick (D)	Tim Murray (D)	William F. Galvin (D)	Martha Coakley (D)	Tim Cahill (I)	A. Joseph DeNucci (D)	35D, 5R	144D, 15R, 1I	Paul G. Kirk (D)	John Kerry (D)	10D	Obama/ Biden (D) ✓
2010	Deval Patrick (D)	Tim Murray (D)	William F. Galvin (D)	Martha Coakley (D)	Tim Cahill (I)	A. Joseph DeNucci (D)	35D, 5R	144D, 15R, 1I	Scott Brown (R)	John Kerry (D)	10D	Obama/ Biden (D) ✓
2011	Deval Patrick (D)	Tim Murray (D)	William F. Galvin (D)	Martha Coakley (D)	Steve Grossman (D)	Suzanne Bump (D)	36D, 4R	127D, 33R	Scott Brown (R)	John Kerry (D)	10D	Obama/ Biden (D) ✓
2012	Deval Patrick (D)	Tim Murray (D)	William F. Galvin (D)	Martha Coakley (D)	Steve Grossman (D)	Suzanne Bump (D)	36D, 4R	127D, 33R	Scott Brown (R)	John Kerry (D)	10D	Obama/ Biden (D) ✓
2013	Deval Patrick (D)	Tim Murray (D)	William F. Galvin (D)	Martha Coakley (D)	Steve Grossman (D)	Suzanne Bump (D)	36D, 4R	131D, 29R	Elizabeth Warren (D)	Mo Cowan (D)	9D	Obama/ Biden (D) ✓
2013	Deval Patrick (D)	vacant	William F. Galvin (D)	Martha Coakley (D)	Steve Grossman (D)	Suzanne Bump (D)	36D, 4R	131D, 29R	Elizabeth Warren (D)	Ed Markey (D)	9D	Obama/ Biden (D) ✓
2014	Deval Patrick (D)	vacant	William F. Galvin (D)	Martha Coakley (D)	Steve Grossman (D)	Suzanne Bump (D)	36D, 4R	131D, 29R	Elizabeth Warren (D)	Ed Markey (D)	9D	Obama/ Biden (D) ✓
2015	Charlie Baker (R)	Karyn Polito (R)	William F. Galvin (D)	Maura Healey (D)	Deb Goldberg (D)	Suzanne Bump (D)	34D, 6R	125D, 35R	Elizabeth Warren (D)	Ed Markey (D)	9D	Obama/ Biden (D) ✓
2016	Charlie Baker (R)	Karyn Polito (R)	William F. Galvin (D)	Maura Healey (D)	Deb Goldberg (D)	Suzanne Bump (D)	34D, 6R	125D, 35R	Elizabeth Warren (D)	Ed Markey (D)	9D	Obama/ Biden (D) ✓
2017	Charlie Baker (R)	Karyn Polito (R)	William F. Galvin (D)	Maura Healey (D)	Deb Goldberg (D)	Suzanne Bump (D)	33D, 7R	125D, 35R	Elizabeth Warren (D)	Ed Markey (D)	9D	Clinton/ Kaine (D) ✗
2018	Charlie Baker (R)	Karyn Polito (R)	William F. Galvin (D)	Maura Healey (D)	Deb Goldberg (D)	Suzanne Bump (D)	33D, 7R	125D, 35R	Elizabeth Warren (D)	Ed Markey (D)	9D	Clinton/ Kaine (D) ✗
2019	Charlie Baker (R)	Karyn Polito (R)	William F. Galvin (D)	Maura Healey (D)	Deb Goldberg (D)	Suzanne Bump (D)	34D, 6R	127D, 32R, 1I	Elizabeth Warren (D)	Ed Markey (D)	9D	Clinton/ Kaine (D) ✗
2020	Charlie Baker (R)	Karyn Polito (R)	William F. Galvin (D)	Maura Healey (D)	Deb Goldberg (D)	Suzanne Bump (D)	36D, 4R	127D, 31R, 1I	Elizabeth Warren (D)	Ed Markey (D)	9D	Clinton/ Kaine (D) ✗
2021	Charlie Baker (R)	Karyn Polito (R)	William F. Galvin (D)	Maura Healey (D)	Deb Goldberg (D)	Suzanne Bump (D)	37D, 3R	129D, 30R, 1I	Elizabeth Warren (D)	Ed Markey (D)	9D	Biden/ Harris (D) ✓
2022	Charlie Baker (R)	Karyn Polito (R)	William F. Galvin (D)	Maura Healey (D)	Deb Goldberg (D)	Suzanne Bump (D)	37D, 3R	130D, 29R, 1I	Elizabeth Warren (D)	Ed Markey (D)	9D	Biden/ Harris (D) ✓
2023	Maura Healey (D)	Kim Driscoll (D)	William F. Galvin (D)	Andrea Campbell (D)	Deb Goldberg (D)	Diana DiZoglio (D)	37D, 3R	134D, 25R, 1I	Elizabeth Warren (D)	Ed Markey (D)	9D	Biden/ Harris (D) ✓
2024	Maura Healey (D)	Kim Driscoll (D)	William F. Galvin (D)	Andrea Campbell (D)	Deb Goldberg (D)	Diana DiZoglio (D)	36D, 4R	134D, 25R, 1I	Elizabeth Warren (D)	Ed Markey (D)	9D	Biden/ Harris (D) ✓
2025	Maura Healey (D)	Kim Driscoll (D)	William F. Galvin (D)	Andrea Campbell (D)	Deb Goldberg (D)	Diana DiZoglio (D)	35D, 5R	134D, 25R, 1I	Elizabeth Warren (D)	Ed Markey (D)	9D	Harris/ Walz (D) ✗
2026	Maura Healey (D)	Kim Driscoll (D)	William F. Galvin (D)	Andrea Campbell (D)	Deb Goldberg (D)	Diana DiZoglio (D)	35D, 5R	134D, 25R, 1I	Elizabeth Warren (D)	Ed Markey (D)	9D	Harris/ Walz (D) ✗
2027	Maura Healey (D)	Kim Driscoll (D)	William F. Galvin (D)	Andrea Campbell (D)	Deb Goldberg (D)	Diana DiZoglio (D)	35D, 5R	138D, 21R, 1I	Elizabeth Warren (D)	Ed Markey (D)	9D	Harris/ Walz (D) ✗

== See also ==
- Politics of Massachusetts
- Elections in Massachusetts
- Government of Massachusetts
- United States state legislatures' partisan trend
