= Senator Reed =

Senator Reed may refer to:

== Members of the United States State Senate ==
- Philip Reed (politician) (1760–1829), Democratic-Republican Senator from Maryland from 1806 to 1813
- Thomas Buck Reed (1787–1829), Jacksonian Senator from Mississippi from 1826 to 1827 and again in 1829
- James A. Reed (politician) (1861–1944), Democratic Senator from Missouri from 1911 to 1929
- Clyde M. Reed (1871–1949), Republican Senator from Kansas from 1939 to 1949
- David A. Reed (1880–1953), Republican Senator from Pennsylvania from 1922 to 1935
- Jack Reed (Rhode Island politician) (born 1949), Democratic Senator from Rhode Island since 1997

== Members of state senates in the United States ==
- Levi Reed (1814–1869), member of the Massachusetts State Senate from 1860 to 1861
- Joseph Rea Reed (1835–1925), member of the Iowa State Senate in 1866 and 1868
- Thomas Brackett Reed (1839–1902), Republican member of the Maine State Senate in 1870
- John H. Reed (1921–2012), Republican member of the Maine State Senate in the 1950s
- Greg Reed (born 1965), Republican member of the Alabama State Senate since 2010
- Kasim Reed (born 1969), Democratic member of the Georgia State Senate from 2003 to 2009
- Carlton Day Reed Jr. (1930–2012), Maine State Senate
- Charles A. Reed (New Jersey politician) (1857–1940), New Jersey State Senate
- Chester I. Reed (1823–1873), Massachusetts State Senate
- Duncan Reed (1815–1890), Wisconsin State Senate
- George B. Reed (1807–1883), Wisconsin State Senate
- Isaac Reed (politician) (1809–1887), Maine State Senate
- Levi Reed (1814–1869), Massachusetts State Senate
- Milton Reed (1848–1932), Massachusetts State Senate
- Myron Reed (1836–____), Wisconsin State Senate
- Perry A. C. Reed (1871–1943), Nebraska State Senate
- Stuart F. Reed (1866–1935), West Virginia State Senate
- William W. Reed (1825–1916), Wisconsin State Senate

== See also ==
- Senator Read (disambiguation)
- Senator Reid (disambiguation)
