= Senator Rhodes =

Senator Rhodes may refer to:

- Doris Lindsey Holland Rhodes (1909–1997), Louisiana State Senate
- Stephen H. Rhodes (1825–1909), Massachusetts State Senate

== See also ==
- Senator Rhoads (disambiguation)
