= Senator Rhoads =

Senator Rhoades may refer to:

- Elijah Rhoades (1791–1858), New York State Senate
- James J. Rhoades (1941–2008), Pennsylvania State Senate

== See also ==
- Dean Rhoads (born 1935), Nevada State Senate
- Senator Rhodes (disambiguation)
