= 10th Massachusetts Infantry Regiment =

- Active: June 21, 1861 – July 6, 1864
- Disbanded: July 6, 1864
- Country: United States
- Allegiance: Union
- Branch: Infantry
- Size: 1,218
- Part of: In 1862: 2nd Brigade (Devens's), 3rd Division (Newton's), VI Corps, Army of the Potomac

Commanders
- Colonel: Henry Shaw Briggs
- Colonel: Henry L. Eustis

Insignia
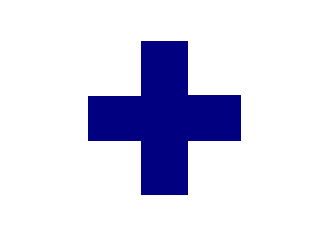
- VI Corps (3rd Division) badge

The 10th Massachusetts Infantry Regiment was a regiment of infantry in the Union Army during the American Civil War. Organized at Hampden Park in Springfield, Massachusetts in the early summer of 1861 and consisting mostly of men from western Massachusetts, the regiment was mustered in on June 21, 1861. It was originally led by Colonel Henry Shaw Briggs, an attorney and prominent citizen of Pittsfield, Massachusetts. A formation of the 10th Massachusetts Infantry

== See also ==
- Massachusetts in the Civil War
- List of Massachusetts Civil War units
