= Senator Reid =

Senator Reid may refer to:

- Albert Reid (1887–1962), former senator from New South Wales
- Clarence A. Reid (1892–1978), Michigan State Senate
- David Settle Reid (1813–1891), North Carolina State Senate
- Harry Reid (1939-2021), former U.S. Senator from Nevada
- Matthew Reid (politician) (1856–1947), former Senator from Queensland
- Stuart Reid (politician) (fl. 1980s–2010s), Utah State Senate

== See also ==
- Senator Read (disambiguation)
- Senator Reed (disambiguation)
