= John K. Tarbox =

American politician (1838–1887)

John Kemble Tarbox
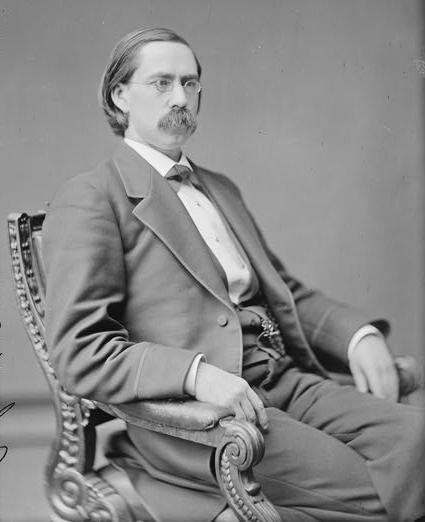

Member of the U.S. House of Representatives from Massachusetts's 7th district
- In office March 4, 1875 – March 3, 1877
- Preceded by: Ebenezer R. Hoar
- Succeeded by: Benjamin Butler

13th Insurance Commissioner of Massachusetts
- In office April 21, 1883 – May 28, 1887
- Nominated by: Benjamin F. Butler
- Preceded by: Julius L. Clarke
- Succeeded by: George S. Merrill

16th Mayor of Lawrence, Massachusetts
- In office 1873–1874
- Preceded by: S. B. W. Davis
- Succeeded by: Robert H. Tewksbury

Member of the Massachusetts Senate
- In office 1872

Member of the Massachusetts House of Representatives
- In office 1868; 1870

Personal details
- Born: May 6, 1838 Methuen, Massachusetts
- Died: May 28, 1887 (aged 49) Boston, Massachusetts
- Resting place: Bellevue Cemetery, Lawrence, Massachusetts
- Party: Democratic
- Spouse(s): Sarah Ann Harmon, m. May 1859. died 1874; Agnes Belle Mullen, m. 1882.
- Education: Franklin Academy, North Andover, Massachusetts
- Profession: Lawyer

Military service
- Allegiance: United States of America; Union
- Branch/service: (United States) Union Army
- Years of service: 1861 – August 28, 1863
- Rank: First Lieutenant
- Unit: 4th Massachusetts Infantry Regiment; Army of the Potomac
- Commands: Company B 4th Massachusetts Infantry Regiment
- Battles/wars: American Civil War

John Kemble Tarbox (May 6, 1838 – May 28, 1887) was a U.S. representative from Massachusetts.

== Biography ==
=== Early life and education ===
Tarbox was born in that part of Methuen, Massachusetts that became incorporated into Lawrence, Massachusetts, Tarbox pursued classical studies, engaged in newspaper work, studied law and was admitted to the bar in 1860 and practiced law.

In May 1859 Tarbox married Sarah Ann Harmon. She died in 1874.

=== American Civil War service ===
During the Civil War he served in the Union Army as a first lieutenant in Company B of the Fourth Regiment, Massachusetts Volunteer Infantry. He was mustered out with his regiment on August 28, 1863.

For a time after his military service Tarbox was the political editor of the Lawrence Sentinel.

=== Early public service career ===
Tarbox was a delegate at the 1864 Democratic National Convention, and an alternate delegate at the 1868 Democratic National Convention. Tarbox served as a member of the Massachusetts House of Representatives in 1868, 1870, and 1871, in the Massachusetts State Senate in 1872, and as the sixteenth Mayor of Lawrence from 1873 to 1874.

=== Congressional service ===
Tarbox was elected as a Democrat to the Forty-fourth Congress (March 4, 1875 – March 3, 1877). He was an unsuccessful candidate for reelection in 1876 to the Forty-fifth Congress.

=== Later public service career ===
Tarbox was the City solicitor of Lawrence, Massachusetts, in 1882 and 1883. From April 21, 1883 to May 28, 1887, Tarbox was the Massachusetts State Insurance Commissioner.

== Death and burial ==
Tarbox died in Boston, Massachusetts, on May 28, 1887 and was interred in Bellevue Cemetery, Lawrence, Massachusetts.

== See also ==
- 1868 Massachusetts legislature
- 1872 Massachusetts legislature

== Notes ==
U.S. House of Representatives
Preceded by Ebenezer R. Hoar	Member of the U.S. House of Representatives from Massachusetts's 7th congressional district March 4, 1875 – March 3, 1877	Succeeded by Benjamin F. Butler
Political offices
Preceded by S. B. W. Davis	16th Mayor of Lawrence, Massachusetts; 1873–1874	Succeeded by Robert H. Tewksbury
Preceded by Julius L. Clarke	13th Insurance Commissioner of Massachusetts; April 21, 1883 – May 28, 1887	Succeeded by George S. Merrill
