= Edmund H. Bennett =

American politician, judge, and academic

Edmund Hatch Bennett
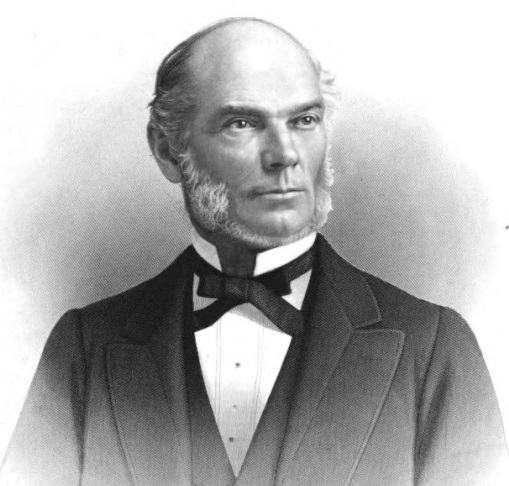

1st Mayor of Taunton, Massachusetts
- In office January 2, 1865 – June 19, 1867
- Preceded by: Allen Presbrey, Esq., (Chairman of the Taunton, Massachusetts; Board of Selectmen)
- Succeeded by: Stephen H. Rhodes

Personal details
- Born: April 6, 1824 Manchester, Vermont
- Died: January 2, 1898 (aged 73) Boston, Massachusetts
- Party: Whig Party, Republican Party
- Spouse: Sally Crocker (m. 1853)
- Children: Caroline, Edmund Neville, Samuel and Mary
- Education: University of Vermont
- Profession: Attorney

Edmund Hatch Bennett (April 6, 1824 – January 2, 1898) was an American lawyer, judge, the first Mayor of Taunton, Massachusetts, and Dean of Boston University School of Law.

== Early life ==
Bennett was born in Manchester, Vermont. His father was Milo Lyman Bennett and his mother was Abigail Hatch. Milo Bennett came from Sharon, Connecticut, and was a graduate of Yale College in 1811. His father studied at the Litchfield Law School, then lived in Burlington, Vermont, and finally settled in Manchester. He served as the State attorney and was also judge of probate. In 183, he became judge of the Vermont Supreme Court, and in 1859 served as a commissioner revising the state's statutes. Conrad Reno in his memoir of New England judges recorded that the Bennett family's ancestors hailed from New England.

Bennett was educated at the Manchester and Burlington Academies, and then studied at the University of Vermont, where he was a member of the Lambda Iota Society. He was graduated in 1843 with a Bachelor of Arts degree. He taught for a while in a private school in Virginia, but abandoned this for a career in law. He started that career as an employee in his father's law office and was admitted to the bar of Vermont in 1847. In July 1848 he relocated to Massachusetts and was admitted to the Suffolk bar. He then moved to Taunton as a partner in the firm of Nathaniel Morton, Henry Williams, Henry J. Fuller and Fred S. Hall. In 1853 Bennett married Sally Crocker, the daughter of the congressman Samuel Leonard Crocker. She outlived him and died in 1911. They had four children: Caroline, Edmund Neville, Samuel and Mary. The first two children died in infancy, while Samuel Bennett later became the Dean of Boston University Law School.

In 1872 the University of Vermont conferred the Doctor of Laws degree (LL. D.) on Bennett.

== Career ==
Bennett maintained an active legal practice in Taunton for many years. In May 1858, he was appointed judge of probate and insolvency in Bristol County, and he held that post until he resigned from it in 1883. In 1864 the city of Taunton was formally incorporated, and Bennett was elected the city's first mayor, he was inaugurated on January 2, 1865. Bennett was re-elected mayor in 1866 and 1867, he served until his resignation on June 19, 1867. In his political career he began as a supporter of the Whig Party and then as a founding member of the Republican Party.

From 1870-1872 he held the post of a lecturer in the Dane Law School at Harvard University. In the fall of 1872 he was appointed as the inaugural Dean of Boston University's Law School but due to ill health had to decline the appointment. He did however teach the law at Boston University, and then in 1875 assumed the post of Dean of the Law School. He held that position until his death in 1898. He lectured in many areas of the law such as contracts, constitutional law, and probate. As an experienced practitioner, judge and law school lecturer Bennett wrote a number of legal textbooks concerning agricultural law, business law, constitutional law, fire insurance, and collated various volumes of English law reports and cases in equity. He also edited and revised a number of existing legal textbooks written by earlier authorities such as Joseph Story's Conflict of Laws (1857), Story's Agency (1862), Blackwell's Tax Titles (1864), and John Indermaur's Principles of the Common Law (1876). According to Jones' Index of Legal Periodical Literature (1888), Bennett is listed as the author of fifty-nine articles in various legal periodicals such as the Harvard Law Review, Law Quarterly Review and American Law Register. He also acted as an editor of various legal journals.

In 1891 Governor William Russell appointed Bennett as chairman of the Board of Commissioners for the Promotion of Uniformity of Legislation in the USA. In 1896 he was appointed by Governor Roger Wolcott as chairman of the Commission on the Revision of the Public Statutes.

Bennett was also interested in early colonial history and belonged to the Old Colony Historical Society. In 1889 he delivered the society's historical address on the occasion of the 250th anniversary of settlement in Taunton. Bennett is remembered and honored in Taunton with a public school named after him. He was elected a Fellow of the American Academy of Arts and Sciences in 1892.

== Religious beliefs ==
Bennett was a lifelong Episcopalian. During his residency in Taunton, Massachusetts Bennett served as a warden at St. Thomas's Episcopal church. He also served as a delegate to the Episcopal church's Diocesan Convention in 1874, 1877, 1880 and 1883, and he was a member of Diocesan Board of Trustees. He was one of the trustees of the Episcopal Theological School in Cambridge, Massachusetts, and served as the school's president from 1895-1898.

Bennett also delivered talks about his faith. One of his lectures was in the field of Christian apologetics. His apologetic work, which was published posthumously, was The Four Gospels from a Lawyer's Standpoint. In this text Bennett argued that the New Testament gospels were trustworthy sources for the life and teachings of Jesus Christ. He accepted the traditional authorship of the gospels - Matthew, Mark, Luke, and John - and applied legal principles of reasoning in examining their accounts about Christ. Bennett opened his lecture by stating:

It is, as you know, a part of the lawyer's profession to examine and cross-examine witnesses, to detect their errors, and expose their falsehoods; or, on the other hand, to reconcile their conflicting statements, and from seeming discord to evolve and make manifest the real truth. And this paper is the result of an effort, on my own part, to ascertain whether or not, independently of divine revelation, independently of the exercise of a devout Christian faith, independently of any appeal to our religious sentiments, the truth of the story told in the four Gospels could be satisfactorily established by a mere reasoning process, and by applying the same principles and the same tests to the Gospel narratives that we observe in determining the truth or falsity of any other documents, or any other historical accounts. (pp 1-2)

Bennett believed that the distinctive content and perspectives about Jesus that appear in the four gospels points to the independence of each writer. He held to the common literary and juridical principle of harmonization when looking at the differences and apparent discrepancies in details as recounted in parallel accounts. Bennett was convinced that the gospels were not forged documents but rather could be depended on as primary sources.

In the late twentieth century Bennett's book was reprinted in the inaugural edition of The Simon Greenleaf School of Law Review (1981–82). His work was also appraised in Ross Clifford's Leading Lawyers' Case for the Resurrection (1996). Bennett's apologetic text is now categorized as belonging to the "juridical" or "legal" school of thought in Christian apologetics.

== Selected writings ==
- English Reports in Law and Equity: Containing Reports of Cases Heard in the House of Lords, Privy Council, courts of equity and common law, and in the Admiralty and Ecclesiastical courts, (Boston: C. C. Little and J. Brown, 1851–1858).
- Farm Law: a treatise on the legal rights and liabilities of farmers, reprint edition, (Littleton: Fred B. Rothman, 1996). ISBN 0-8377-1981-X
- "Forebearance to Sue," Harvard Law Review, vol. 10, no. 2 (May 25, 1896), pp. 113–118.
- The Four Gospels from a Lawyer's Standpoint, (Boston and New York: Houghton, Mifflin & Co, 1899).
- The Four Gospels from a Lawyer's Standpoint reprinted in The Simon Greenleaf Law Review, Vol. 1 (1981–82), pp. 15–74.
- Hints About Business: A Manual of Business Law, Customs and Methods, (Portland, Me: Hoyt, Fogg and Donham, 1881).
- "Is Mere Gain to a Promisor a Good Consideration for His Promise?" Harvard Law Review, Vol. 10, no. 5 (December 26, 1896), pp. 257–264.
- Selection of Leading Cases in Criminal Law, second edition (Boston: Little, Brown & Co, 1869).

== See also ==
- List of mayors of Taunton, Massachusetts

Political offices
Preceded by Allen Presbrey, Esq., Chairman of the Board of Selectmen	1st Mayor of Taunton, Massachusetts; January 2, 1865-June 19, 1867	Succeeded by Stephen H. Rhodes
