= Senator Read =

Senator Read may refer to:

== Members of the United States Senate ==
- George Read (American politician, born 1733) (1733–1798), U.S. Senator from Delaware from 1789 to 1793
- Jacob Read (1752–1816), U.S. Senator from South Carolina from 1795 to 1801

== United States state senate members ==
- Almon Heath Read (1790–1844), Pennsylvania State Senate
- Gilbert E. Read (1822–1898), Michigan State Senate
- John Milton Read (1842–1881), Wisconsin State Senate
- John Read (lawyer) (1769–1854), Pennsylvania State Senate
- Seth Read (1746–1797), Massachusetts State Senate
- Thomas Read (politician) (1881–1962), Michigan State Senate
- William B. Read (1817–1880), Kentucky State Senate

== See also ==
- Senator Reed (disambiguation)
- Senator Reid (disambiguation)
- Edwin Godwin Reade, American judge and Confederate States Senator
