= Henry Shaw Briggs =

American politician

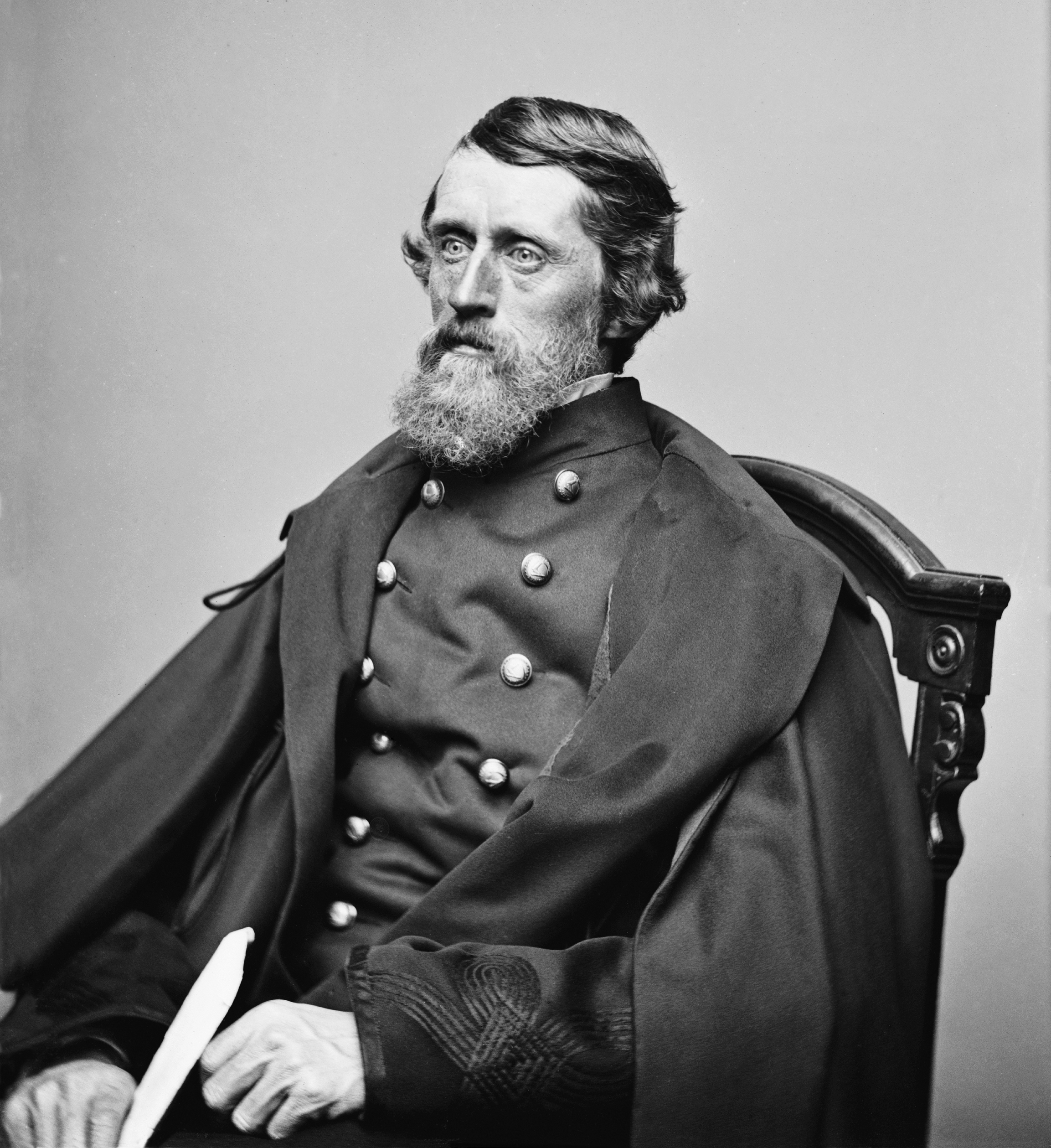

Justice of the Central Berkshire District Court
- In office 1869–1873
- Succeeded by: Joseph Tucker

8th Massachusetts Auditor
- In office 1866–1870
- Governor: Alexander H. Bullock; William Claflin
- Preceded by: Julius L. Clarke
- Succeeded by: Charles Endicott

Police Justice of the Town of Pittsfield, Massachusetts
- In office 1857–1857

Member of the Massachusetts House of Representatives
- In office January 1856 – June 1856

Personal details
- Born: August 1, 1824 Lanesborough, Massachusetts, US
- Died: September 23, 1887 (aged 63) Pittsfield, Massachusetts, US
- Resting place: Pittsfield Cemetery, Pittsfield, Massachusetts
- Party: Republican
- Spouse: Mary Elizabeth Talcott
- Children: Mary Talcott Briggs
- Education: Williams College, class of 1844

Military service
- Allegiance: United States of America; Union
- Branch/service: United States Army; Union Army
- Years of service: 1861–1865
- Rank: Brigadier General
- Commands: Company K, 8th Regiment Massachusetts Volunteer Infantry; 10th Regiment Massachusetts Volunteer Infantry; 1st Brigade, 1st Division (Couch's), IV Corps; Briggs's Brigade, VIII Corps; Briggs's Brigade, 1st Division, I Corps
- Battles/wars: American Civil War; Peninsula Campaign; Battle of Seven Pines

Henry Shaw Briggs (August 1, 1824 – September 23, 1887) was brigadier general in the Union Army during the American Civil War.

During the war, Briggs served as a captain with the 8th Regiment Massachusetts Volunteer Infantry. He was the colonel and first commander of the 10th Regiment Massachusetts Volunteer Infantry. After suffering serious wounds during the Battle of Fair Oaks in 1862, Briggs was promoted to brigadier general and served primarily administrative commands in Baltimore, Washington, D.C., and Alexandria, Virginia. He was, however, periodically assigned various brigade commands in the field for brief periods during the latter half of the war.

Both prior to and after the war, Briggs was a lawyer and politician. He served as a state legislator, Massachusetts Auditor and a judge.

== Early years ==
Briggs was born to George Nixon Briggs, (governor of Massachusetts from 1844–1851) on August 1, 1824, in Lanesborough, Massachusetts. Henry Briggs graduated from Williams College in 1844 and was admitted to the Massachusetts Bar in 1848.

On August 6, 1849, Briggs married Mary Elizabeth Talcott, daughter of Nathianiel P. Talcott of Lanesborough, Massachusetts.

Shortly before the war, Briggs established a law practice in Pittsfield, Massachusetts. He took an interest in military affairs as well and became captain of a company of state militia in Pittsfield known as the "Allen Guards." Briggs also took an active interest in politics. In 1856, he served as a member of the Massachusetts Legislature.

== Civil War service ==
=== 8th Massachusetts ===
In the days following the attack on Fort Sumter, Briggs's company became Company K of the 8th Massachusetts. After reaching Maryland, Company K was detached from the regiment and assigned garrison duty at Fort McHenry near Baltimore. The company eventually rejoined the rest of the regiment and labored to repair and guard the railroads in the vicinity of Baltimore.

=== 10th Massachusetts ===
On June 21, 1861, Briggs was detached from service with the 8th Massachusetts, promoted to colonel and placed in command of the newly formed 10th Massachusetts. The regiment reached Washington, D.C., on July 28 and spent the remainder of 1861 in camp near Washington, drilling and preparing for the spring campaign. The regiment was eventually attached to the IV Corps.

In March 1862, Major General George B. McClellan commenced his Peninsular Campaign aimed at capturing the Confederate capital of Richmond, Virginia. As the Army of the Potomac (of which the 10th Massachusetts was a part), moved by water to the Virginia Peninsula, Col. Briggs was placed in command of the 1st Brigade, 1st Division of the IV Corps on March 13, 1862. He served in this capacity until May 1862 when he was replaced by Brig. Gen. Charles Devens and returned to command the 10th Massachusetts. The 10th Massachusetts, led by Briggs, saw its first major action during the Battle of Fair Oaks on May 31, 1862. The regiment suffered severe casualties during this engagement and Col. Briggs was seriously wounded, shot through both legs.

=== Brigade commands ===
The severity of his wounds obliged Briggs to relinquish command of the 10th Massachusetts. He returned to Massachusetts for the remainder of the summer of 1862 to recover. For his "gallant conduct on the field" during the Battle of Fair Oaks, Briggs was promoted to brigadier general on July 17, 1862. In September 1862, Briggs was reassigned to command Camp Chase on Arlington Heights just outside Washington. This was a training camp for new regiments arriving in Washington from across the country. During the Maryland Campaign in September 1862, Briggs was briefly assigned to command the 2nd Brigade, 3rd Division of the V Corps taking several fresh regiments to reinforce McClellan's Army of the Potomac. Briggs, however, had not fully recovered from his wounds and was unable to take the field.

In February 1863, Briggs was assigned to the Army's Middle Department, commanding a brigade in the VIII Corps serving guard duty in Maryland. Serving in this capacity until July 1863, Briggs's headquarters was in Baltimore.

For two weeks in the latter part of July 1863, during the Confederate retreat from Gettysburg, Pennsylvania, Briggs was placed in command of a brigade of the 1st Division, I Corps. His brigade did not see any significant action during this time. August 1863 found Briggs in command of another training camp in Alexandria, Virginia known as the "Rendezvous for Draftees," a post he maintained until July 1864.

From that date until his resignation on December 4, 1865, Briggs served on court-martial boards in Washington.

== Post-war career ==
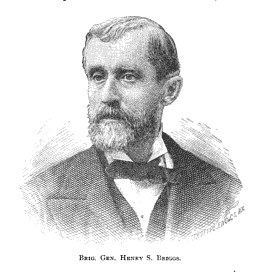
As a civilian

Briggs returned to a political and law career after the war. From 1865 to 1868, he served as Massachusetts Auditor. With the establishment of the District Court of Central Berkshire in 1869, Briggs was appointed a standing justice of that court in recognition of his law career and his duty on court-martial boards during the war. Briggs resigned from the bench in 1873.

Briggs died of heart disease on September 23, 1887.

== See also ==
- List of American Civil War generals (Union)
- List of Massachusetts generals in the American Civil War
- Massachusetts in the American Civil War

== Notes ==
Political offices
Preceded by Julius L. Clarke	Massachusetts Auditor; 1866 – 1870	Succeeded by Charles Endicott
