= Massachusetts State Auditor =

Chief accountability officer of the Commonwealth of Massachusetts

State Auditor of the Commonwealth of Massachusetts
- Seal of Massachusetts

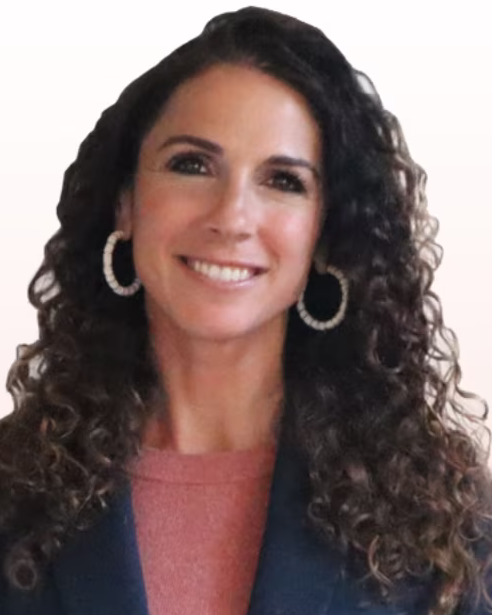
- Incumbent; Diana DiZoglio since January 18, 2023
- Government of Massachusetts
- Style: Mister or Madam Auditor (informal); The Honorable (formal)
- Type: Constitutional officer Auditor general
- Residence: None official
- Seat: State House, Boston, Massachusetts
- Nominator: Nominating petition, Political parties
- Appointer: Direct election
- Term length: Four years, no term limit
- Constituting instrument: Constitution of Massachusetts
- Formation: 1849; 177 years ago
- First holder: David Wilder Jr.
- Succession: Fifth
- Website: www.mass.gov/auditor/

The state auditor of Massachusetts is an elected constitutional officer in the executive branch of the U.S. state of Massachusetts. Twenty-six individuals have occupied the office of state auditor since the office's creation in 1849. The incumbent is Diana DiZoglio, a Democrat.

== Election ==
=== Term of office ===
The state auditor is elected by the people on Election Day in November to four-year terms, and takes office on the third Wednesday of the January following a general election. There is no limit to the number of terms a state auditor may hold. Institutionally speaking, the state auditor is thus completely independent of both the governor and General Court for the purpose of performing their official duties. These constitutional protections notwithstanding, the state auditor may still be impeached for misconduct or maladministration by the House of Representatives and, if found guilty, removed from office by the Senate.

=== Qualifications ===
Any person seeking election to the office of state auditor must meet the following requirements:

1. Be at least eighteen years of age;
2. Be a registered voter in Massachusetts;
3. Be a Massachusetts resident for at least five years when elected; and
4. Receive 5,000 signatures from registered voters on nomination papers.

=== Vacancies ===
In the event of a vacancy in the office of state auditor, the General Court is charged, if in session, with electing from among the eligible citizens of the Commonwealth a successor to serve the balance of the prior auditor's term in office. (Note: Citizens of the Commonwealth of the Massachusetts are officially designated as "Bay Staters". Being a Bay Stater implies concurrent U.S. citizenship, which is required in order to vote in Massachusetts and to run for any public office, including that of state auditor.) If, however, the vacancy occurs while the General Court is not in session, then responsibility for appointing a successor falls to the governor. The appointment is not valid without the advice and consent of the Governor's Council.

== Powers and duties ==
The state auditor conducts independent and objective performance audits of each department, office, commission, agency, authority, institution, court, county, and any other activity of the Commonwealth, including programs and contractors of the foregoing entities, at least once in every three fiscal years. By virtue of this same mandate, the state auditor may also audit any city, town, or school district upon request of the governing body thereof or pursuant to a petition of the residents from the locality concerned. Regardless of the entity subject to audit, all audits conducted by the Office of the State Auditor are performed in accordance with Government Auditing Standards. (Note: Also known as "The Yellow Book", Government Auditing Standards is promulgated by the comptroller general of the United States, the head of the Government Accountability Office.)

In addition to performance audits, the Office of the State Auditor provides other assurance services to citizens and taxpayers alike. For instance, the state auditor investigates alleged or suspected instances of welfare fraud in social safety net programs. Moreover, the state auditor ascertains whether state laws impose burdensome mandates on local governments, reviews proposals from state agencies to privatize services, and monitors the ownership, organization, and financial condition of private occupational schools operating in Massachusetts.

Functional responsibilities aside, the state auditor chairs the Municipal Finance Oversight Board and is a member of the Advisory Board to the Office of the Comptroller of the Commonwealth. The former considers applications from local governments to use the Commonwealth's bond rating to finance capital improvement projects, land acquisition, and emergency repairs. By using the state's bond rating, municipalities can secure lower interest rates, thereby saving taxpayer money. The latter, on the other hand, advises the comptroller of the Commonwealth in the performance of their duties, approves accounting standards promulgated by the comptroller prior to their implementation, and reviews both the statewide single audit and the annual comprehensive financial report for the Commonwealth as prepared by the comptroller's office.

== History ==
The office of state auditor was created by the General Court pursuant to Massachusetts Acts and Resolves 1849, Chapter 56. The auditor was initially a legislative appointee chosen annually by a joint session of the General Court, but became an elective office in the executive branch with the approval of a constitutional amendment put to the voters in 1855.

From its inception, the office of state auditor functioned as both the Commonwealth's comptroller and external auditor. Thus, the auditor maintained the statewide accounting system, administered payroll to state employees, settled claims by and against the Commonwealth, and certified to the Executive Council those claims eligible to be paid by warrant. If both the governor and the Executive Council agreed with the auditor's recommendation, the Governor-in-Council would then draw its warrant on the state treasurer in payment of claims approved. In turn, the state auditor annually examined the revenues and expenses of all state agencies and reconciled their accounting records with the statewide accounts kept in the auditor's office. It was from this annual financial audit that the state auditor prepared year-end reports on the financial condition and operations of the Commonwealth for the consideration of the governor and General Court.

These functions changed substantially in 1922, when the precursor to what is today the Department of Administration and Finance was created and all of the state auditor's accounting responsibilities were thereto transferred. The motive for this reorganization was rather straightforward: the agency responsible for independently auditing the Commonwealth's financial statements should not be involved in their preparation or in the operation of the central accounting system. Doing so otherwise violates the principle of auditor independence. Thus, the General Court passed legislation redesignating the state auditor exclusively as Massachusetts' auditor general. Over the course of the ensuing six decades, state auditors annually examined and passed upon the presentation of financial statements prepared by both individual state agencies and the state government as a whole.

The most recent change to the state auditor's remit came about in 1986, when the Office of the Comptroller of the Commonwealth was established as an independent state agency. Upon its creation, the comptroller's office was granted the authority to prescribe uniform internal control systems in consultation with the state auditor. The comptroller's office was also directed at inception to engage certified public accountants of the comptroller's own choosing to conduct both the audit of the annual comprehensive financial report as well as the statewide single audit of federal programs administered by the Commonwealth on behalf of the U.S. government. It was at this time the Office of the State Auditor transitioned away from financial auditing and instead towards risk-based performance audits of state agencies, their vendors, and political subdivisions. Performance auditing remains a core function of the auditor's office to the present day.

== List of State Auditors of Massachusetts ==
#	Auditor	Picture	Term	Party
1	David Wilder Jr.		1849–1854	Whig
2	Joseph Mitchell		1854–1855	
3	Stephen N. Gifford		1855–1856	Whig
4	Chandler R. Ranson		1856 – January 20, 1858	
5	Charles White		January 20, 1858 – 1861	
6	Levi Reed		1861 – December 20, 1865	Republican
7	Julius L. Clarke		December 1865 – 1866	Republican
8	Henry S. Briggs		1866–1870	Republican
9	Charles Endicott		1871–1876	Republican
10	Julius L. Clarke		1876 – May 5, 1879	Republican
11	Charles R. Ladd		May 5, 1879 – 1891	Republican
12	William D. T. Trefry		1891–1892	Democratic
13	John W. Kimball		1892–1901	Republican
14	Henry E. Turner		1901–1911	Republican
15	John E. White		July 6, 1911 – 1914	Republican
16	Frank H. Pope		1914–1915	Democratic
17	Alonzo B. Cook		1915–1931	Republican
18	Francis X. Hurley		1931–1935	Democratic
19	Thomas H. Buckley		1935–1939	Democratic
20	Russell A. Wood		1939–1941	Republican
21	Thomas J. Buckley		1941 – September 10, 1964	Democratic
22	Thaddeus M. Buczko		September 24, 1964 – 1981	Democratic
23	John J. Finnegan		1981–1987	Democratic
24	A. Joseph DeNucci		1987–2011	Democratic
25	Suzanne Bump		2011–2023	Democratic
26	Diana DiZoglio		2023–present	Democratic
