= John J. Finnegan =

American politician (1938–2025)

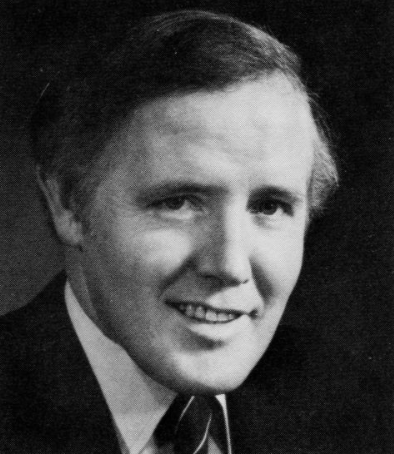

Massachusetts State Auditor
- In office 1981–1987
- Governor: Edward J. King; Michael Dukakis
- Preceded by: Thaddeus M. Buczko
- Succeeded by: A. Joseph DeNucci

Member of the Massachusetts House of Representatives
- In office 1967–1981
- Preceded by: Thomas A. Sheehan
- Succeeded by: James T. Brett

Personal details
- Born: July 21, 1938 Boston, Massachusetts, U.S.
- Died: March 31, 2025 (aged 86) Boston, Massachusetts, U.S.
- Party: Democratic
- Education: University of Massachusetts Amherst; New England School of Law
- Profession: Attorney

John J. Finnegan (July 21, 1938 – March 31, 2025) was an American politician who served as Massachusetts State Auditor from 1981 to 1987. Before this, he served as a member of the Massachusetts House of Representatives between 1967 and 1981.

After serving as a member of the Massachusetts House of Representatives since 1967, Finnegan was elected by the state legislature to fill the unexpired term of State Auditor Thaddeus M. Buczko, who resigned to become Justice of the Essex County Probate and Family Court. He was elected in his own right in 1982. He did not run for re-election in 1986 and was succeeded by Joe DeNucci.

Finnegan died on 31 March 2025, at the age of 86.

== See also ==
- Massachusetts House of Representatives' 18th Suffolk district

Party political offices
Preceded by Thaddeus M. Buczko	Democratic nominee for Auditor of Massachusetts; 1982	Succeeded by A. Joseph DeNucci
Political offices
Preceded by Thaddeus M. Buczko	Massachusetts State Auditor; 1981–1987	Succeeded by A. Joseph DeNucci
