= Stephen H. Rhodes =

American politician

Stephen Holbrook Rhodes
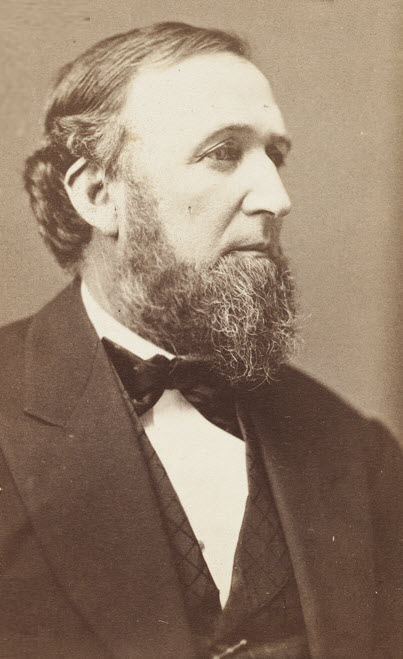

2nd Mayor of Taunton, Massachusetts
- In office June 19, 1867 – 1870
- Preceded by: Edmund H. Bennett
- Succeeded by: Daniel L. Mitchell

Member of the Massachusetts State Senate
- In office 1870–1871

Member of the Taunton, Massachusetts Board of Aldermen Ward One
- In office 1867 – June 19, 1867
- Preceded by: Edgar H. Reed
- Succeeded by: Abram Biggs

4th President of The John Hancock Mutual Life Insurance Company.
- In office March 1879 – June 11, 1909
- Preceded by: George Thornton
- Succeeded by: Roland O. Lamb

11th Insurance Commissioner of Massachusetts
- In office December 8, 1874 – March 12, 1879
- Preceded by: Julius L. Clarke
- Succeeded by: Julius L. Clarke

Personal details
- Born: November 7, 1825 Franklin, Massachusetts
- Died: June 11, 1909 (aged 83) Brookline, Massachusetts
- Spouse: E. M. Godfry

Stephen Holbrook Rhodes (November 7, 1825 – June 11, 1909) was a Massachusetts businessman and politician who served in the Massachusetts Senate, as the second Mayor of Taunton, Massachusetts, and as the fourth President of The John Hancock Mutual Life Insurance Company.

== Early life ==
Rhodes was born in Franklin, Massachusetts, on November 7, 1825, to Stephen and Betsy (Bird) Rhodes.

== Family life ==
Rhodes married E. M. Godfry in Taunton, Massachusetts, on November 27, 1847.

== Death ==
Rhodes died on June 11, 1909, at his home in Brookline, Massachusetts.

== See also ==
- 1870 Massachusetts legislature
- 1871 Massachusetts legislature

== Notes ==
Business positions
Preceded by George Thornton	4th President of The John Hancock Mutual Life Insurance Company; March 1879–June 11, 1909	Succeeded by Roland O. Lamb
Political offices
Preceded by Edmund H. Bennett	2nd Mayor of Taunton, Massachusetts; June 19, 1867-1870	Succeeded by Daniel L. Mitchell
Preceded by Edgar H. Reed	Member of the Taunton, Massachusetts; Board of Aldermen; Ward 1; 1867 – June 19, 1867	Succeeded by Abram Biggs
Preceded by Julius L. Clarke	11th Insurance Commissioner of Massachusetts; December 8, 1874–March 12, 1879	Succeeded by Julius L. Clarke
