= Stephen N. Gifford =

American politician

Stephen Nye Gifford
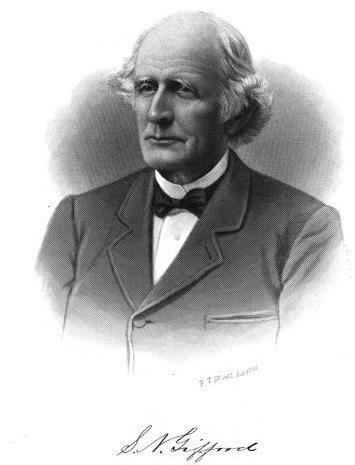

3rd Massachusetts Auditor
- In office 1855–1856
- Governor: Henry Gardner
- Preceded by: Joseph Mitchell
- Succeeded by: Chandler R. Ranson

Massachusetts House of Representatives
- In office 1850, 1851 – 1852

Personal details
- Born: July 21, 1815 Pembroke, Massachusetts
- Died: April 18, 1886 (aged 71) Duxbury, Massachusetts
- Party: Whig

Stephen Nye Gifford (1815-1886) was an American politician who served as a member of the Massachusetts House of Representatives, Massachusetts Auditor and was clerk of the Massachusetts Senate from January 6, 1858, to April 18, 1886.

Born in Pembroke, Massachusetts on July 21, 1815, he was educated at Hanover Academy and the academy at Bridgewater. As a young man he was employed as a schoolteacher, eventually establishing a private academy at Duxbury. In 1850 he was elected as a Whig to represent Duxbury in the state house of representatives. In 1851 he was appointed Inspector in the Boston Custom House; in 1855 he was chosen to supply a vacancy in the office of State Auditor. In 1855 and 1857 he served as assistant clerk of the Massachusetts House of Representatives, and in 1858 he became Clerk of the Senate, holding that post for 28 years until his death in 1886. During this time he was noted as a parliamentary expert and authority on technical points of legislation.

== Bibliography ==
- Massachusetts Senate, A Memorial of Stephen Nye Gifford: Clerk of the Massachusetts Senate from January 6, 1858 to April 18, 1886. (1886).
- New York Times, Obituary – Stephen N. Gifford, Page 4, (April 19, 1886).
- Andrews, Geo. F. Commonwealth of Massachusetts Official Gazette. State Government, 1886. Pages 22–23, (1886).

Political offices
Preceded by Joseph Mitchel	3rd Massachusetts Auditor; 1855–1856	Succeeded by Chandler R. Ranson
