= Charles R. Ladd =

American politician

Charles Rensselaer Ladd
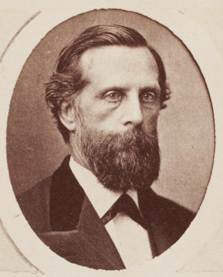

11th Massachusetts Auditor
- In office May 5, 1879 – 1891
- Appointed by: Thomas Talbot
- Preceded by: Julius L. Clarke
- Succeeded by: William D. T. Trefry

Member of the Massachusetts House of Representatives
- In office 1879–1879

Member of the Massachusetts State Senate First Hampden District
- In office 1869–1870

Member of the Massachusetts House of Representatives
- In office 1853–1854

Member of the Springfield, Massachusetts Board of Aldermen

Member of the Springfield, Massachusetts Common Council

Treasurer of Hampden County, Massachusetts
- In office 1859–1867
- Preceded by: Norman Norton
- Succeeded by: M. Wells Bridge

Register of Probate Hampden County, Massachusetts
- In office 1857–1859
- Preceded by: Charles A. Winchester
- Succeeded by: William S. Shurtleff

Member of the Chicopee, Massachusetts Board of Selectmen

Personal details
- Born: April 9, 1822 Tolland, Connecticut
- Died: October 27, 1903 (aged 81) Jacksonville, Florida
- Party: Republican
- Spouse: Ella M. Weaver
- Profession: Attorney

Charles Rensselaer Ladd (April 9, 1822 – October 27, 1903) was an American attorney and politician who served as Massachusetts Auditor.

== See also ==
- 1869 Massachusetts legislature
- 1870 Massachusetts legislature
- 1873 Massachusetts legislature

== Bibliography ==
- Andrews, George F.:, Official Gazette 1888 State House Directory, p. 13, (1888).
- Copeland, Alfred Minott: Our county and its people: A History of Hampden County Massachusetts, Volume One, pages. 149, 151 (1902).
- Hennessy, Michael Edmund: Twenty-Five Years of Massachusetts Politics: from Russell to McCall, 1890–1915, page 2, (1917).
- Rand, John Clark:, One of a Thousand: a Series of Biographical Sketches of One Thousand Representative Men, Boston, MA: First National Publishing Company, p. 362, (1890).
- The Atlanta Constitution, Charles R. Ladd., p. 9, (October 28, 1903).
- The New York Times, DEATH LIST OF A DAY. Charles Rensselaer Ladd, p. 9, (October 28, 1903).

Political offices
Preceded by Julius L. Clarke	11th Massachusetts Auditor; May 5, 1879–1891	Succeeded by William D. T. Trefry
