= David Wilder Jr. =

American politician

Massachusetts Auditor
- In office 1849–1854
- Governor: George N. Briggs; George S. Boutwell; John H. Clifford

Treasurer and Receiver-General of Massachusetts
- In office 1837–1842
- Governor: Edward Everett; Marcus Morton
- Preceded by: Hezekiah Barnard
- Succeeded by: Thomas Russell

Personal details
- Born: 3 May 1778
- Died: 21 September 1866 (aged 88) Duxbury, Massachusetts
- Party: Whig

David Wilder Jr. (3 May 1778 – 21 September 1866) was an American politician who served as the Treasurer and Receiver-General of Massachusetts and as the first Massachusetts Auditor.

In January 1837, Wilder was elected Treasurer of Massachusetts, having received 396 votes compared to his closest opponent's 236 votes.

Political offices
Preceded by New Office	Massachusetts Auditor; 1849 – 1854	Succeeded by Joseph Mitchel
Preceded by Hezekiah Barnard	Treasurer and Receiver-General of Massachusetts; 1837 – 1842	Succeeded by Thomas Russell
