= Thaddeus M. Buczko =

American politician (1926–2021)

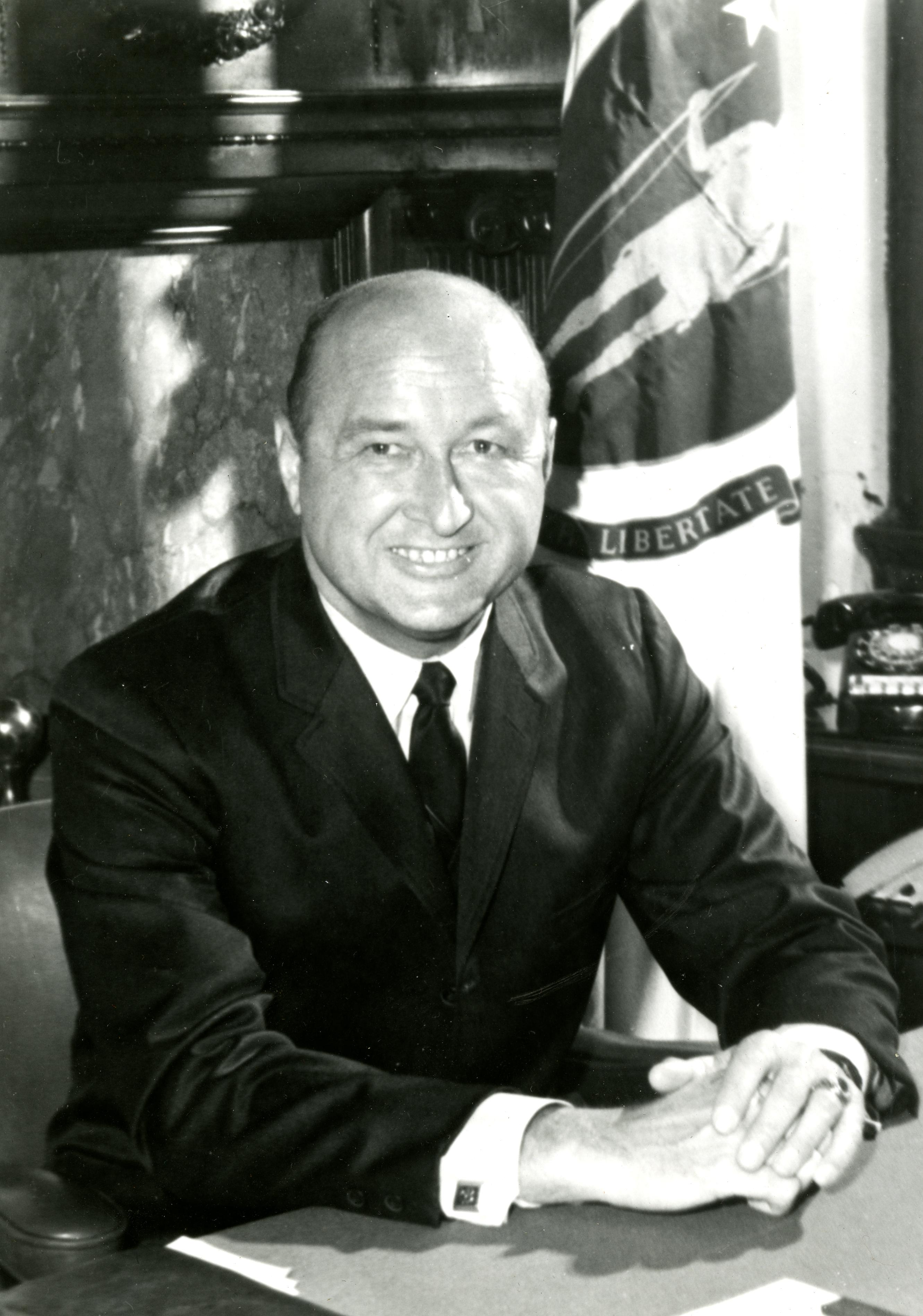

Justice of the Essex County Probate and Family Court
- In office February 4, 1981 – 1996.
- Nominated by: Edward J. King

19th Massachusetts Auditor
- In office September 24, 1964 – February 1981
- Governor: Endicott Peabody; John Volpe; Francis Sargent; Michael Dukakis; Edward J. King
- Preceded by: Thomas J. Buckley
- Succeeded by: John J. Finnegan

Member Massachusetts House of Representatives 10th Essex District
- In office 1959–1964
- Preceded by: John E. Murphy
- Succeeded by: Michael J. Harrington

Member of the Salem, Massachusetts City Council

Personal details
- Born: February 23, 1926 Salem, Massachusetts
- Died: March 7, 2021 (aged 95) Salem, Massachusetts
- Party: Democratic
- Education: Norwich University, 1947; Boston University Law School, 1951
- Profession: Attorney
- Awards: Meritorious Service Medal, 1975, Legion of Merit, 1979, U.S. Army

Military service
- Allegiance: United States of America
- Branch/service: United States Navy
- Rank: Colonel, Major
- Battles/wars: World War II; Korean War

Thaddeus M. Buczko (February 23, 1926 – March 7, 2021) was an American politician who served as a Salem, Massachusetts city councillor, a member of the Massachusetts House of Representatives and as Massachusetts Auditor. Additionally, from 1981 to 1996, Buczko served as a justice of the Essex County Probate and Family Court; Buczko, retired in 1996.

He died on March 7, 2021, in Salem, Massachusetts, at age 95.

== Bibliography ==
- Commonwealth of Massachusetts, 1961-1962 Public Officers of the Commonwealth of Massachusetts, p. 110, (1961).
- Commonwealth of Massachusetts, 1967-1968 Public Officers of the Commonwealth of Massachusetts, p. 25, (1967).
- Wierzbianski, Boleslaw.: Who's Who in Polish America 1st Edition 1996–1997, (1996).

Party political offices
Preceded by Thomas J. Buckley	Democratic nominee for Auditor of Massachusetts; 1964, 1966, 1970, 1974, 1978	Succeeded by John J. Finnegan
Political offices
Preceded by Thomas J. Buckley	19th Massachusetts Auditor; September 24, 1964 –1981	Succeeded by John J. Finnegan
Legal offices
Preceded by	Justice of the Essex County Probate and Family Court; February 4, 1981 – 1996	Succeeded by
