= Hezekiah Barnard =

American politician

Treasurer and Receiver-General of Massachusetts
- In office 1832–1837
- Governor: Levi Lincoln Jr. Samuel Turell Armstrong; Edward Everett
- Preceded by: Joseph Sewall
- Succeeded by: David Wilder Jr.

Member of the Massachusetts House of Representatives Nantucket County

Hezekiah Barnard was an American politician who served as a member of the Massachusetts House of Representatives and as the Treasurer and Receiver-General of Massachusetts.

== Notes ==
Political offices
Preceded by Joseph Sewall	Treasurer and Receiver-General of Massachusetts; 1832 – 1837	Succeeded by David Wilder Jr.
