= Julius L. Clarke =

American politician (1828–1907)

Julius Laurens Clarke

12th Insurance Commissioner of Massachusetts
- In office May 3, 1879 – February 14, 1883
- Preceded by: Stephen H. Rhodes
- Succeeded by: John K. Tarbox

10th Massachusetts Auditor
- In office 1877 – May 5, 1879
- Governor: Alexander H. Rice
- Preceded by: Charles Endicott
- Succeeded by: Charles R. Ladd

10th Insurance Commissioner of Massachusetts
- In office October 28, 1869 – January 1, 1875
- Preceded by: John E. Sanford
- Succeeded by: Stephen H. Rhodes

7th Massachusetts Auditor
- In office December 1865 – 1869
- Governor: John Albion Andrew; Alexander H. Bullock
- Preceded by: Levi Reed
- Succeeded by: Henry S. Briggs

Personal details
- Born: November 13, 1828 Chatham, Connecticut, U.S.
- Died: November 21, 1907 (aged 79) Newton Upper Falls, Massachusetts, U.S.
- Party: Republican
- Education: Kimble Union Academy

Julius Laurens Clarke (November 13, 1828 – November 22, 1907) was an American newspaper publisher and politician who served as Massachusetts Auditor, and as Massachusetts' Insurance Commissioner.

Clarke was born in Chatham, Connecticut, in an area that became Portland, Connecticut.

In 1845 Clarke started the first daily newspaper in Worcester, Massachusetts. The Worcester Transcript was started on the June 9, 1845.

Political offices
Preceded by Levi Reed	7th Massachusetts Auditor; December 1865–1866	Succeeded by Henry S. Briggs
Preceded by John E. Sanford	10th Insurance Commissioner of Massachusetts; October 28, 1869 – January 1, 1875	Succeeded by Stephen H. Rhodes
Preceded by Charles Endicott	10th Massachusetts Auditor; 1876 – May 5, 1879	Succeeded by Charles R. Ladd
Preceded by Stephen H. Rhodes	12th Insurance Commissioner of Massachusetts; Mav 3, 1879 – February 14, 1883	Succeeded by John K. Tarbox
