= Charles Endicott =

American politician

Charles W. Endicott
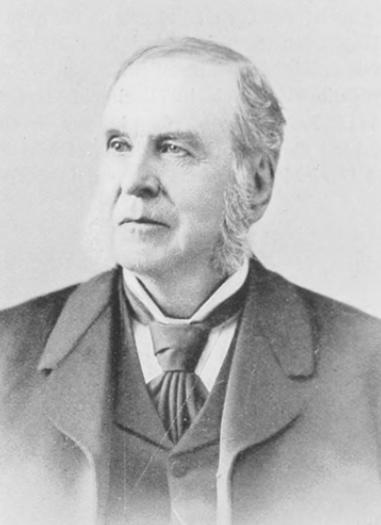

Massachusetts Treasurer
- In office 1877–1881
- Governor: Alexander H. Rice; Thomas Talbot; John D. Long
- Preceded by: Henry S. Briggs
- Succeeded by: Julius L. Clarke

Massachusetts Auditor
- In office 1871–1876
- Governor: William Claflin; William B. Washburn; Thomas Talbot; William Gaston
- Preceded by: Henry S. Briggs
- Succeeded by: Julius L. Clarke

Member of the Massachusetts Executive Council
- In office 1868–1869

Member of the Massachusetts Senate
- In office 1866–1867

Member of the Massachusetts House of Representatives
- In office 1851, 1857, 1858

Personal details
- Born: October 28, 1822 Canton, Massachusetts
- Died: August 19, 1899 (aged 76) Boston, Massachusetts
- Party: Republican
- Spouses: Miriam Webb (m. 1845) Augusta G. Dinsmore (m. 1848)
- Children: Charles W. Endicott, (child of Miriam Webb); Edward D. Endicott, Cynthia Endicott (m. R. Montgomery Field 1887) (children of Augusta G. Dinsmore).
- Profession: Attorney

Charles W. Endicott (October 28, 1822 – August 19, 1899) was an American attorney and politician who served as Auditor and Treasurer of Massachusetts, and was a member of both houses of the state legislature.

== Early life ==
Endicott was born in Canton, Massachusetts to Elijah Endicott and Cynthia (Childs) Endicott, and attended the local schools.

He married Miriam Webb on September 30, 1845, and they had one child. He remarried to Augusta G. Dinsmore on October 2, 1848, and they had two children.

He was appointed a Norfolk County deputy sheriff in 1846. He read law, and was admitted to the bar in 1857.

Endicott served in Canton as a town clerk, member of the school committee, and representative to both the House of Representatives (in 1851, 1857, and 1858), and the State Senate (in 1866 and 1867).

== State treasurer ==
In November 1875 Endicott was elected state treasurer for a term beginning in January 1876.

Endicott retired from the treasurer's office after his fifth term. Endicott had served five consecutive one year terms as treasurer and he was barred by term limits from running for re-election.

Endicott died on August 20, 1899, after fainting in his home, with heatstroke being identified as a possible cause. At the time of his death, he was thought to be in good health.

== See also ==
- 88th Massachusetts General Court (1867)

Political offices
Preceded by Henry S. Briggs	Massachusetts Auditor; 1871–1876	Succeeded by Julius L. Clarke
Preceded by Charles Adams, Jr.	Massachusetts Treasurer; 1876-1881	Succeeded by Daniel A. Gleason
