= Levi Reed =

American politician

Massachusetts Auditor
- In office 1861 – December 20, 1865
- Governor: John Albion Andrew
- Preceded by: Charles White
- Succeeded by: Julius L. Clarke

Massachusetts State Senator for Plymouth County
- In office 1860–1861

Personal details
- Born: December 31, 1814 East Abington, Massachusetts
- Died: October 18, 1869 (aged 54)
- Spouse: Louisa C. Drake
- Education: Philips Academy

Levi Reed (December 31, 1814 – October 18, 1869) was an American politician. He was a descendant of William Reed, an early settler in Massachusetts. Reed married Louisa C. Drake in 1837. Before entering politics, Reed was a public school teacher. In 1860, he was elected as a state senator, and from 1861 to 1866, he served as Auditor of the Commonwealth of Massachusetts.

Political offices
Preceded by Charles White	Massachusetts Auditor; January 1861–December 20, 1865	Succeeded by Julius L. Clarke
