= Timeline of Lowell, Massachusetts =

Coordinates: 42.639444°N 71.314722°W

The following is a timeline of the history of Lowell, Massachusetts, US.

== 19th century ==
- 1822
  - Merrimack Manufacturing Company incorporated.
  - Hugh Cummiskley leads 30 Irishmen up the Middlesex Canal starting in Charlestown, Mass to Pawtucket falls in Chelmsford, Ma
- 1824
  - St. Anne's Church organized.
  - Lowell Daily Journal and Courier begins publication.
- 1825 - Middlesex Mechanic Association, Hamilton Manufacturing Company,and Mechanic Phalanx established.
- 1826
  - Town of Lowell established from Chelmsford land.
  - First Baptist Church and First Universalist Church organized.
  - Merrimack Journal newspaper in publication.
  - Central Bridge opens.
- 1827 - First Methodist Episcopal Church organized.
- 1828 - Appleton Company, Lowell Bank, and Lowell Manufacturing Company incorporated.
  - Labor Organizing Begins: Early mill workers, mostly young Yankee women, form informal mutual aid groups to address 14-hour workdays and low wages ($2–$3/week, minus boarding costs).
- 1829
  - Lowell Institution for Savings incorporated.
  - Lowell Fire Department established.
- 1830
  - Lawrence Manufacturing Company, Middlesex Company, Suffolk Manufacturing Company, and Tremont Mills incorporated.
  - Appleton Street Church, South Congregational Church, and Worthen Street Baptist Church established.
  - Town Hall built.
  - Population: 6,474.
- 1831
  - First Roman Catholic Church organized.
  - Railroad Bank incorporated.
- 1832 - Lowell Bleachery incorporated.
- 1833 - Police Court established.
- 1834
  - Lowell Mill Girls Strike, Female textile workers, primarily young Yankee women, stage one of America’s first labor strikes after the Lowell mills cut wages by 15%. About 800 workers walk out, protesting exploitation and poor boardinghouse conditions. The strike fails to reverse the cuts but sparks union organizing

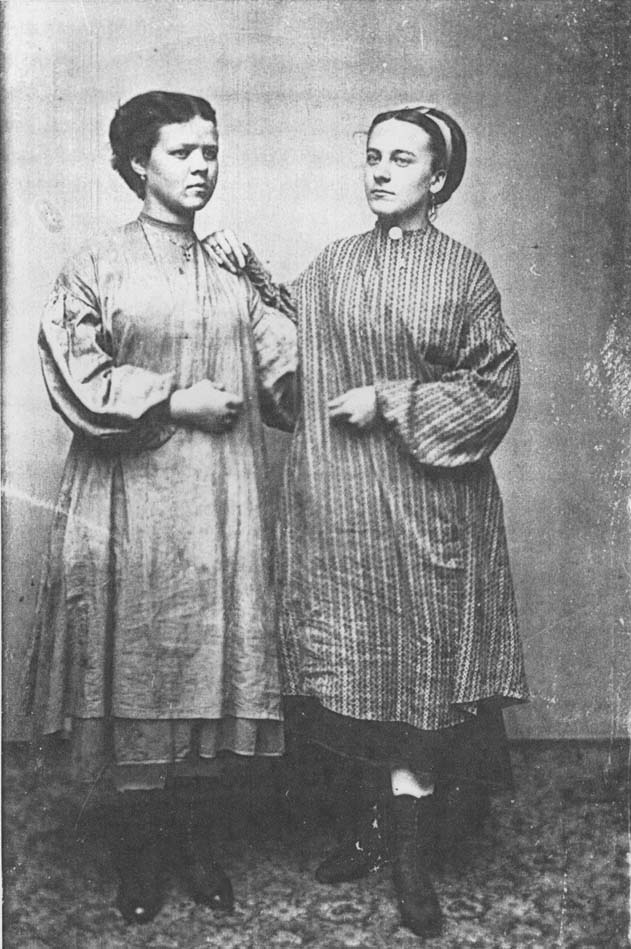
Lowell mill girls photographed with a tintype (c. 1870)

  - First Freewill Baptist Church organized.
  - Lowell Advertiser and Lowell Patriot newspapers begin publication.
  - Lowell Circulating Library in business.
  - James Abbott McNeill Whistler, painter born.
- 1835
  - Boston and Lowell Railroad begins operating.
  - Boott Cotton Mills incorporated.
  - Lucy Larcom, teacher, poet and author moves to Lowell.
- 1836
  - City of Lowell incorporated.
  - Lowell mill girls Second Mill Girls Strike with over 1,500 female mill workers strike when mill owners raise boardinghouse rents by 12.5%, effectively cutting take-home pay. Workers form the Lowell Factory Girls Association, circulating petitions and halting production for days. The strike partially succeeds, with some rent hikes rescinded.
- 1838
  - Nashua and Lowell Railroad begins operating.
  - County jail built.
- 1839
  - Massachusetts Cotton Mills incorporated.
  - Middlesex Horticultural Society and Lowell Medical Association founded.
- 1840
  - Hospital Association and Lowell Museum established.
  - Lowell Offering begins publication.
  - By now, Lowell mills had recruited over 8,000 Lowell mill girls.
  - Population: 20,796.
- 1841
  - Lowell Cemetery established.
  - Vox Populi newspaper begins publication.
- 1842 - Charles Dickens visits Lowell.
- 1843 - First Wesleyan Methodist Churchand Missionary Association established.
- 1844 - City Library, Lowell Female Labor Reform Association, and New Jerusalem Swedenborgian Church established.
- 1845 - Lowell Machine Shop incorporated.
  - Lowell Female Labor Reform Association: Led by Sarah Bagley, workers demand a 10-hour workday (vs. 12–14 hours). They gather 2,000 signatures for state petitions but face firings. Source: Lowell National Historical Park Archives. Wages: Women earn $2–$2.75/week; skilled male mechanics earn $5–$7/week.
- 1846
  - Lowell and Lawrence Railroad incorporated.
  - Jefferson Bancroft becomes mayor.
- 1847 - June: U.S. president Polk visits Lowell.
- 1848 - Francis floodgate and Colburn School built.
- 1850
  - Lowell Gas Light Company in business.
  - Salem and Lowell Railroad begins operating.
  - Middlesex County Law Library founded.
  - Court-House built.
  - Population: 33,383.
- 1851 - Lowell Daily Citizen newspaper begins publication.
- 1852 - May: Lajos Kossuth visits Lowell.
- 1853
  - Belvidere Woollen Manufacturing Company organized.
  - St. Patrick's Church and Merrimack Street Depot built.
- 1856 - Jail built.
- 1857 - Varnum School built.
- 1863 - High School Association organized.
- 1864 - Lowell Horse Railroad begins operating.
- 1865
  - United States Bunting Company in business.
  - Wamesit Power Company incorporated.
- 1867 - St. John's Hospital and Young Men's Christian Association established.
- 1868 - Old Franklin Literary Association and Old Residents' Historical Association organized.
- 1870 - Coggeshall's Circulating Library in business.
- 1873 - Young Women's Home established.
- 1875 - Riding Park, and Club Dramatique established.
- 1876
  - Moxie beverage invented.
  - Lowell Art Association founded.
- 1882 - Butler School built.
- 1883
  - Public Library opens.
  - Yorick Club active.
- 1887 - Board of Trade established.
- 1889 - Opera House built.
- 1890 - Population: 77,696.
- 1891 - Lowell General Hospital founded.
- 1893 - Lowell Post Office built.
- 1894 - Normal School and Middlesex Women's Club founded.
- 1895 - Middlesex Village School built.
- 1897 - Lowell Textile School opens.
- 1898 - Pawtucket Congregational Church built.
- 1900
  - Gaity Theatre opens.
  - Population: 94,969.

== 20th century ==
- 1902 - Lowell Historical Society incorporated.
- 1905 - Tewksbury's Wigginville neighborhood annexed to the City of Lowell.
- 1908 - Holy Trinity Greek Orthodox Church built.
- 1909 - Lowell's Merrimack Valley Course hosted a motor racing festival that featured four AAA-sanctioned championship car races.
- 1910 - Population: 106,294.
- 1911 - Colonial Theatre opens.
- 1917 - Demoulas Market (grocery) in business.
- 1918 - International Institute active.
- 1922 - Lowell Memorial Auditorium built.
- 1924 - Commodore Ballroom opens.
- 1925 - Edith Nourse Rogers becomes U.S. representative for Massachusetts's 5th congressional district.
- 1927 - Victory Theater opens.
- 1930 - Post Office built.
- 1937 - Cawley Memorial Stadium built.
- 1942 - Lowell Ordnance Plant active.
- 1946 - New England Golden Gloves boxing tournament begins.
- 1951
  - WCAP (AM) radio begins broadcasting.
  - Monarch Diner in business.
- 1970 - Lowell Community Health Center established.
- 1971 - Lowell Historic District Commission proposed by City Councilor M. Brendan Fleming approved by the Lowell City Council
- 1974 - Lowell Regional Transit Authority created.
- 1975
  - University of Massachusetts Lowell established.
  - Paul Tsongas becomes U.S. representative for Massachusetts's 5th congressional district.
- 1976 - Wang Laboratories relocates to Lowell.
- 1978
  - Lowell National Historical Park established.
  - Yorick Club goes bankrupt.
- 1979
  - B. Joseph Tully becomes city manager.
  - Merrimack Regional Theatre active.
- 1980
  - Wang headquarters construction begins.
  - Population: 92,418.
- 1983 - Lowell Historic Board and Downtown Lowell Historic District established.
- 1987
  - Middlesex Community College opens campus in Lowell.
  - New England Quilt Museum founded.
- 1989
  - Glory Buddhist Temple established.
  - Sister city relationship established with Saint-Dié-des-Vosges, France.
- 1990
  - Lowell Folk Festival begins.
  - Baystate Marathon begins.
- 1991
  - Richard Johnson becomes city manager.
  - University of Massachusetts' Industrial History Center established.
- 1992 - August: Wang goes bankrupt.
- 1995
  - Brian J. Martin becomes city manager.
  - Chamber of Commerce formed.
- 1996
  - Lowell Spinners baseball team founded.
  - Stoklosa Alumni Field opens.
- 1997
  - Showcase Cinema in business.
  - Merrimack Valley Textile Museum relocated to Lowell.
- 1998
  - Edward A. LeLacheur Park and Paul E. Tsongas Center at UMass Lowell open.
  - Lowell Lock Monsters hockey team formed.
  - City website online (approximate date).

== 21st century ==
- 2000
  - John Cox becomes city manager.
  - String Project (music education) established.
- 2001
  - Cultural Organization of Lowell established.
  - Winterfest begins.
  - Sister city relationships established with Phnom Penh and Siem Reap, Cambodia.
- 2006
  - Bernard Lynch becomes city manager.
  - Shree Swaminarayan Temple established.
  - Sister city relationship established with Bryansk, Russia.
- 2007 - Niki Tsongas becomes U.S. representative for Massachusetts's 5th congressional district.
- 2010
  - Patrick O. Murphy becomes mayor.
  - Sister city relationship established with Winneba, Ghana.
  - Population: 106,519.
- 2011
  - Patrick O. Murphy ran for reelection. He finished fourth of seventeen candidates, earning another term on the Lowell City Council. On January 3, 2012, the City Council voted 5 to 4 to name Murphy Mayor of Lowell. At 29, he was youngest Mayor in Lowell history.
- 2014
  - July: Fire.
  - Kevin Murphy becomes city manager. served as Lowell’s city manager from 2014 to 2018, managing municipal operations and economic development. From 1997 to 2014, he was a Massachusetts House of Representatives member for the 18th Middlesex District, focusing on housing, urban development, and veterans’ affairs. Admitted to the Massachusetts Bar in 1983, Murphy is active in the American, Massachusetts, and Greater Lowell Bar Associations, contributing to legal and community advocacy.
- 2015
  - UMass Lowell bolsters its reputation as a research and innovation hub by opening the Mark and Elisia Saab Emerging Technologies and Innovation Center. This state-of-the-art facility enhances the university’s capacity for cutting-edge research in fields like nanotechnology and advanced manufacturing, solidifying Lowell’s status as a center for higher education and economic growth.
- 2017
  - The Hamilton Canal Innovation District celebrates the opening of its first major residential and commercial building, housing 100+ residents and new retail spaces, marking a step toward a vibrant, mixed-use urban core.
  - The Lowell Transitional Living Center expands its shelter capacity by 20 beds through a partnership with the city and private donors, providing more unhoused individuals with meals, job training, and case management.
  - The Lowell National Historical Park reports 250,000 visitors, with the Tsongas Industrial History Center launching a new textile machinery exhibit, per NPS data. The park generates $20M in tourism revenue.
- 2019
  - The “Canal Place” mixed-use development opens in the Hamilton Canal District, with 200 apartments and a 15,000 sq ft innovation hub, per city planning reports. It creates 100 jobs and houses 400 residents.
- 2020
  - The City of Lowell invested big at the Pollard Memorial Library, $3M to restore the historic Pollard Memorial Library, upgrading digital resources and accessibility, per library records. It serves 100,000 patrons annually.
- 2025
  - Lowell implemented a public camping ban targeting unhoused individuals erecting tent encampments in city parks and other public spaces. According to the January 2025 homeless census reported to the U.S. Department of Housing and Urban Development, 150 people were living outdoors in the city. Lowell officials are currently informing those on the streets about the ban and the availability of beds or floor mats at local shelters, as mandated by the ordinance. Citations will only be issued to individuals who persist in camping on city property after being offered shelter space.

== See also ==
- History of Lowell, Massachusetts
- List of mayors and city managers of Lowell, Massachusetts
- National Register of Historic Places listings in Lowell, Massachusetts
- Timelines of other municipalities in Middlesex County, Massachusetts: Cambridge, Somerville, Waltham

== Bibliography ==
Published in the 19th century

- Lowell Directory. Lowell, Massachusetts: Benjamin Floyd. 1832.
- Lowell Directory. Lowell: Benjamin Floyd. 1835.
- Benjamin Floyd (1840). Lowell Directory. Lowell.
- William H. Prescott (1841). Lowell Directory. Lowell: Leonard Huntress, printer.
- Charles Dickens (1842), "Lowell", American Notes, London: Chapman and Hall
- Lowell Directory ... 1844. Lowell: Turner. 1844.
- Lowell Directory. Lowell: Oliver March. 1847.
- Lowell Directory. Lowell: Oliver March. 1849.
- George Adams (1851). Lowell Directory. Lowell: Oliver March.
- Charles Cowley (1856), Hand Book of Business in Lowell, Lowell: E.D. Green, OCLC 9488073, OL 6905491M
- Adams, Sampson & Co. (1857). Lowell Directory ... 1858. Lowell: Joshua Merrill and B.C. Sargeant.
- Jeremiah Spofford (1860), "Lowell", Historical and Statistical Gazetteer of Massachusetts (2nd ed.), Haverhill: E.G. Frothingham
- Adams, Sampson & Co. (1861). Lowell Directory. Lowell: Joshua Merrill and B.C. Sargeant.
- Lowell Directory, 1866. Boston: Sampson, Davenport, & Co. 1866.
- Sampson, Davenport, & Co. (1868). Lowell Directory, 1868. Lowell: Joshua Merrill & Son.
- Sampson, Davenport, & Co. (1870). Lowell Directory, 1870. Lowell: Joshua Merrill & Son.
- "Lowell Business Directory". Merrimack River Directory. Boston: Greenough, Jones. 1872.
- Sampson, Davenport, & Co. (1875). Lowell Directory, 1875-6. Lowell: Joshua Merrill & Son.
- Joseph Sabin, ed. (1878). "Lowell, Mass.". Bibliotheca Americana. Vol. 10. New York. OCLC 13972268.
- Hopkins (1879). City Atlas of Lowell, Massachusetts – via State Library of Massachusetts.
- "Lowell" . Encyclopædia Britannica. Vol. 15 (9th ed.). 1883.
- "City of Lowell", Industries of Massachusetts, New York: International Pub. Co., 1886, OCLC 19803267
- Exercises of the Fiftieth Anniversary Commemorative of the Incorporation of the City of Lowell, Lowell, Mass: Vox Populi Press, S.W. Huse & Co., 1886, OL 14007310M
- Atlas of the City of Lowell, Massachusetts. L.J. Richards & Co. 1896 – via State Library of Massachusetts.
- The Lowell Book, Boston: G.H. Ellis, 1899, OCLC 14177988, OL 6997495M

Published in the 20th century

- Atlas of the City of Lowell, Massachusetts. L.J. Richards & Co. 1906 – via State Library of Massachusetts.
- "Lowell" . Encyclopædia Britannica. Vol. 17 (11th ed.). 1910. pp. 76–77.
- George F. Kenngott (1912), Record of a City: a Social Survey of Lowell, Massachusetts, New York: Macmillan Co., OCLC 2048985, OL 13542090M
- Frederick William Coburn (1920). History of Lowell and Its People. New York: Lewis Historical Publishing Company – via HathiTrust.
- Atlas of the City of Lowell, Massachusetts. L.J. Richards & Co. 1924 – via State Library of Massachusetts.
- Federal Writers' Project (1937), "Lowell", Massachusetts: a Guide to its Places and People, American Guide Series, Boston: Houghton Mifflin, hdl:2027/mdp.39015014440781
- Eno, Arthur L. Jr., ed. (1976). Cotton Was King: A History of Lowell, Massachusetts (1976 ed.). New Hampshire Publishing Company. p. 190. ISBN 0912274611.
- Lowell Cultural Resources Inventory, 1980, archived from the original on February 3, 2014
- Lowell Neighborhoods: Historical and Architectural Survey, 1981, archived from the original on February 3, 2014
- "Boom to Bust: Wang Bankruptcy Leaves Lowell Sagging Under the Weight of Recession", Boston Globe, August 25, 1992
- George Thomas Kurian (1994), "Lowell, Massachusetts", World Encyclopedia of Cities, vol. 1: North America, Santa Barbara, Calif.: ABC-CLIO, OL 1431653M (fulltext via Open Library)

Published in the 21st century

- Carolyn M. Goldstein (2000). "Many Voices, True Stories, and the Experiences We Are Creating in Industrial History Museums: Reinterpreting Lowell, Massachusetts". Public Historian. 22 (3): 129–137. doi:10.2307/3379583. JSTOR 3379583.
- "Around Boston: Lowell", New England (3rd ed.), Lonely Planet, 2002, p. 172+, OL 24765202M
- Cathy Stanton (2006). The Lowell Experiment: Public History in a Postindustrial City. University of Massachusetts Press. ISBN 1-55849-547-9.

== Images ==
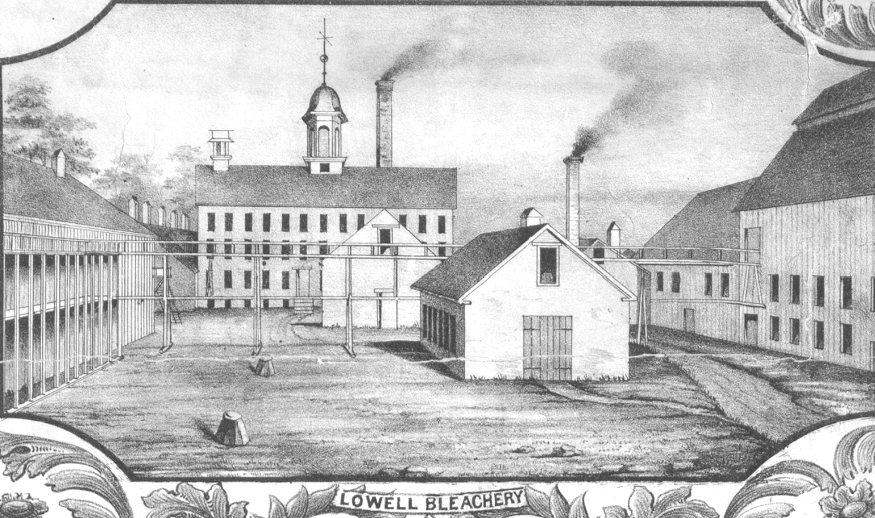
Lowell Bleachery, incorporated 1832

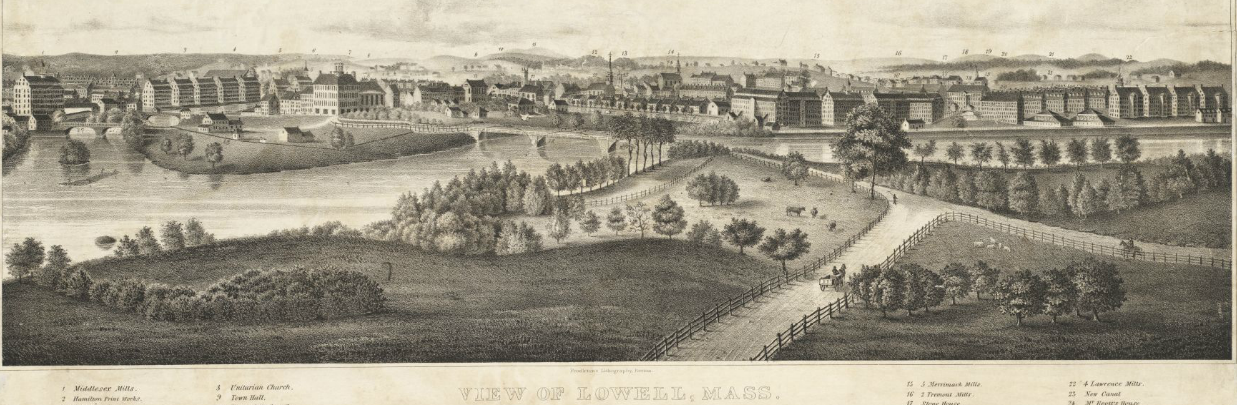
Lowell, 1834

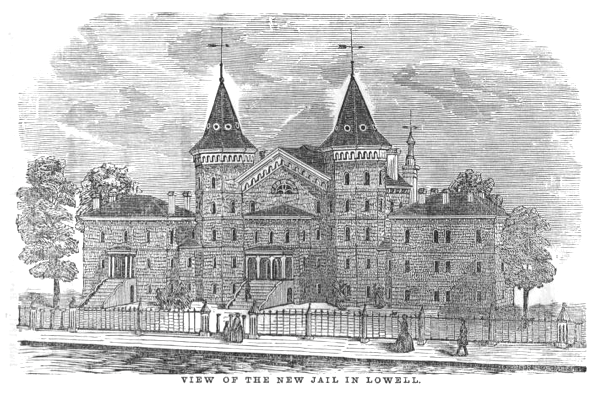
Jail, built 1856

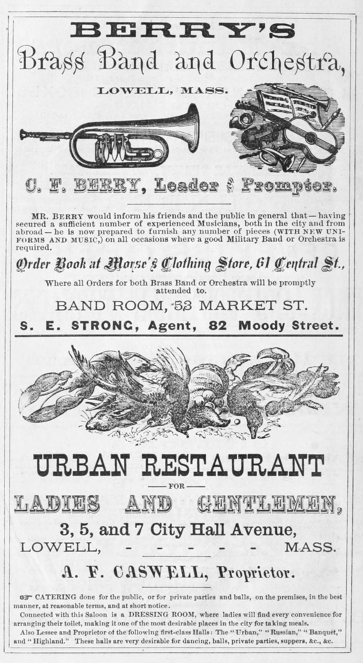
Advertisements, 1875

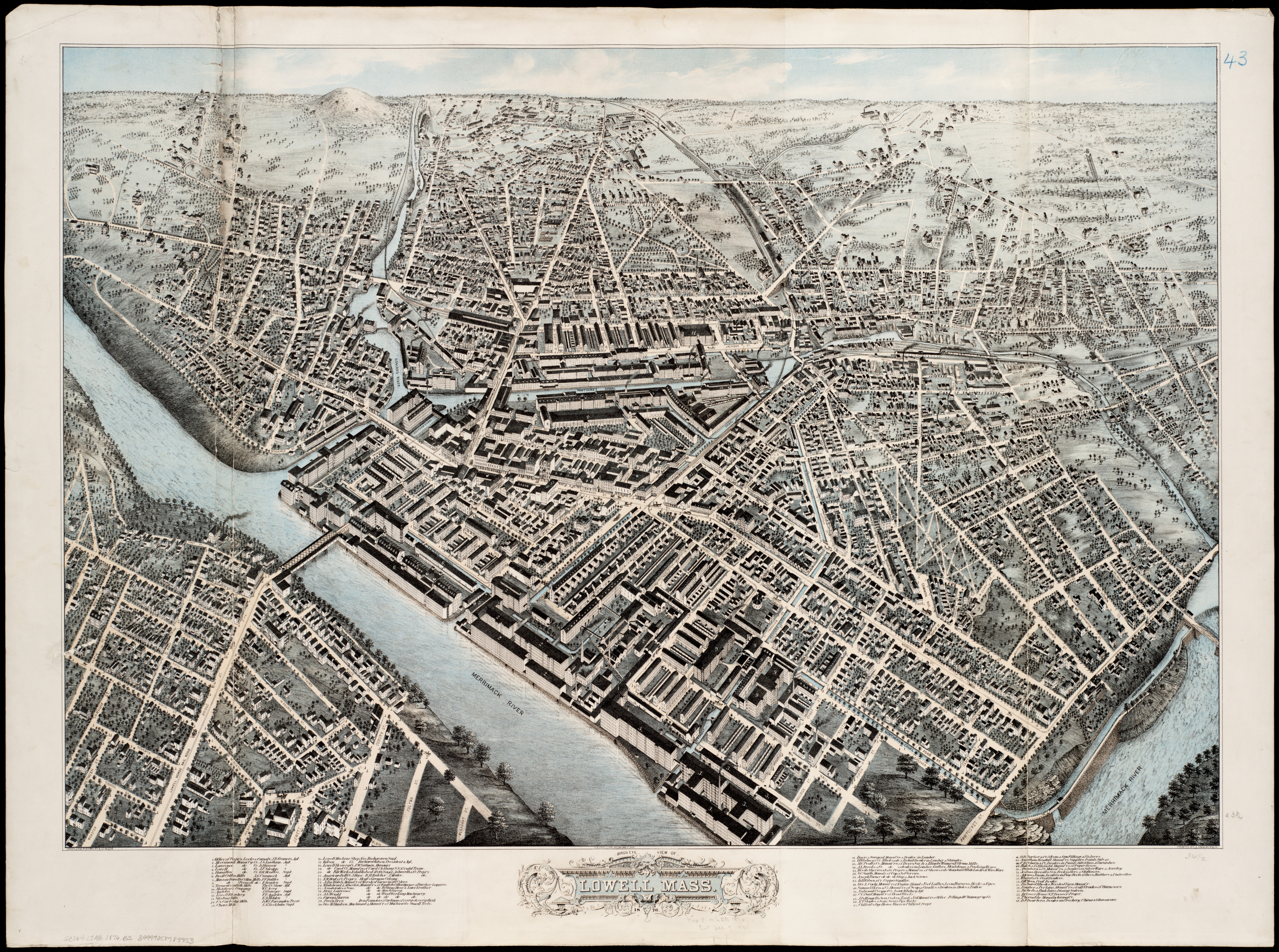
Map of Lowell, 1876
