= Richard Warner =

Richard Warner may refer to:

- Richard Warner (actor) (1911–1989), English actor
- Richard Warner (botanist) (1711/3–1775), English scholar
- Richard Warner (antiquary) (1763–1857), English clergyman and antiquarian
- Richard Warner (Tennessee politician) (1835–1915), U.S. Representative from Tennessee
- Richard Everett Warner (1861–?), American businessman and politician who served as the mayor of Taunton, Massachusetts
- Richard Warner, American drummer and former member of the power metal band Kamelot
- Dick Warner (1946–2017), Irish environmentalist, writer and broadcaster
