= John Francis Parker =

American politician (1907-1992)

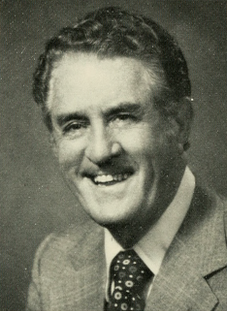

Minority Leader of the Massachusetts Senate
- In office 1967–1989
- Preceded by: Philip A. Graham
- Succeeded by: David H. Locke

Member of the Massachusetts Senate
- In office 1953–1989
- Preceded by: Francis J. O'Neill
- Succeeded by: Theodore J. Aleixo Jr.
- Constituency: 1st Bristol district Bristol and Norfolk (1975–79)

Mayor of Taunton, Massachusetts
- In office 1947–1954
- Preceded by: Merrill Aldrich
- Succeeded by: Joseph C. Chamberlain

Chair of the Massachusetts Republican Party
- In office 1965–1967
- Preceded by: Frederic C. Dumaine Jr.
- Succeeded by: Josiah Spaulding

Personal details
- Born: May 29, 1907 Dorchester, Massachusetts, U.S.
- Died: December 1992 (aged 85)
- Party: Republican
- Profession: Newspaper compositor

John Francis Parker (May 29, 1907-December 1992) was an American Republican Party politician from Massachusetts who served as the mayor of Taunton and represented the area in the Massachusetts Senate from 1953 to 1989. He was a leader within the Massachusetts Republican Party, serving as its chair from 1967 to 1969 and leading the minority in the Senate from 1967 to 1989.

He was the last of a long line of part-time mayors of Taunton, Massachusetts. By his efforts the city council decided to make the position full-time. Parker was elected to the State Senate in 1953, and served for many years as the Minority Leader of the Massachusetts Senate, the post he held when he retired from public life in 1989. He was also a member of the Taunton School Committee.

Parker desired to succeed Congressman Joseph William Martin Jr. in the U.S. House of Representatives, however Parker refused to oppose the elderly former Speaker in the Republican primary of 1968. Martin was defeated in the primary by Governor’s Councilor Margaret Heckler effectively ending Parker's efforts of attaining higher office.

A middle school within the city is named in honor of his service to the city, and a section of U.S. Route 44 is named in honor of Parker and his wife, Mae, who had no children. The Taunton Municipal Golf Course was changed to the John F. Parker Municipal Golf Course.

== See also ==
- Massachusetts legislature: 1953–1954, 1955–1956, 1957–1958, 1959–1960, 1961–1962, 1963–1964, 1965–1966, 1967–1968, 1969–1970, 1971–1972, 1973–1974, 1975–1976, 1977–1978, 1979–1980, 1981–1982, 1983–1984, 1985–1986, 1987–1988
