= Brian J. Martin =

American politician

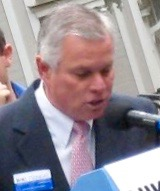
- Martin in 2007

City Manager of Lowell, Massachusetts
- In office 1995–2000
- Preceded by: Richard Johnson
- Succeeded by: John F. Cox

76th Mayor of Lowell, Massachusetts
- In office 1984–1985
- Preceded by: M. Brendan Fleming
- Succeeded by: Robert B. Kennedy

Personal details
- Occupation: Political figure Educator

Brian J. Martin is an American education and political figure who served as Headmaster of Lowell High School in Lowell, Massachusetts from 2013 to 2017. He previously served as Lowell's Mayor and City Manager.

== Early life ==
Martin attended Lowell High School, where he was a star baseball player. He attended the University of Massachusetts Amherst and was a member of the UMass Minutemen baseball team. After graduating, Martin worked as a gym teacher, coach, and administrator at Greater Lowell Technical High School.

== City councilor and mayor ==
In 1981, Martin was elected to the Lowell City Council. In 1983 he was chosen by his fellow councilors to serve as Mayor of Lowell, a strictly ceremonial role as the city is administered by a professional city manager. At the age of 33, he was the youngest mayor in the city's history.

== City manager ==
Martin remained on the city council until 1988, when he stepped down to become assistant city manager of Lowell. He was a contender for the city manager's job in 1991 when James Campbell stepped down, but Taunton Mayor Richard Johnson was chosen instead. He remained assistant city manager under Johnson and in 1995 succeeded him as city manager. In 1999, the city of Lowell paid $70,000 to settle a lawsuit brought by a security company that had been passed over for a contract in favor of a firm owned by two friends of Martin. The State Ethics Commission investigated and fined Martin $1,750 for violating the state's conflict of interest law. In 2000, Martin left the city manager's post to work in the private sector.

== Later career ==
In 2003, Martin was named interim president and general manager of the Lowell Lock Monsters of the American Hockey League. At the end of the 2004-05 AHL season, he left the Lock Monsters to become athletic director at Lowell High School. In November 2007 he left LHS to work for Congresswoman Niki Tsongas. He worked in her Lowell office as district director and Senior Advisor on Economic Development. In 2013 Martin was named Headmaster of Lowell High School, a position which he held until 2017.

== See also ==
- Timeline of Lowell, Massachusetts, 1990s
