= Senator Pacheco =

Senator Pacheco may refer to:

- Marc Pacheco (born 1952), Massachusetts State Senate
- Romualdo Pacheco (1831–1899), California State Senate
