= List of sister cities in New England =

This is a list of sister cities in the U.S. states of New England (i.e. Connecticut, Maine, Massachusetts, New Hampshire, Rhode Island, and Vermont). Sister cities, known in Europe as town twins, are cities which partner with each other to promote human contact and cultural links, although this partnering is not limited to cities and often includes counties, regions, states and other sub-national entities.

Many New England jurisdictions work with foreign cities through Sister Cities International, an organization whose goal is to "promote peace through mutual respect, understanding, and cooperation."

== Connecticut ==
Bridgeport

- Qingyuan, China

Coventry

- Coventry, England, United Kingdom

Danbury

- Gouveia, Portugal

Enfield

- Ronneby, Sweden
- Zhongli (Taoyuan), Taiwan

Essex

- Deschapelles (Verrettes), Haiti

Greenwich

- Hangzhou, China
- Kitzbühel, Austria
- Morra De Sanctis, Italy
- Nacka, Sweden
- Rose, Italy
- Vienne, France

Groton

- Kingston, Jamaica

Hartford

- Caguas, Puerto Rico
- Dongguan, China
- Floridia, Italy
- Morant Bay, Jamaica
- (Republic of Ireland) New Ross, Ireland
- Ocotal, Nicaragua
- Sogakope, Ghana
- Thessaloniki, Greece

Middletown

- Melilli, Italy

New Britain

- Atsugi, Japan
- Giannitsa, Greece
- Pułtusk, Poland
- Rastatt, Germany
- Solarino, Italy

New Haven

- Afula, Israel
- Amalfi, Italy
- Changsha, China
- Freetown, Sierra Leone
- Huế, Vietnam
- León, Nicaragua
- San Francisco Tetlanohcan, Mexico

New London

- Kingston, Jamaica

Norwalk

- Nagarote, Nicaragua
- Riobamba, Ecuador

Ridgefield

- Druzhkivka, Ukraine

Seymour

- Nakło nad Notecią, Poland

Stamford

- Afula, Israel
- Jiangdu (Yangzhou), China
- Kramatorsk, Ukraine
- Lima, Peru
- Minturno, Italy
- Nanping, China
- Nezahualcóyotl, Mexico
- Pune, India
- Rose, Italy
- Settefrati, Italy
- Sparta, Greece

Stratford

- Stratford (Wellington), Australia
- Stratford, Ontario, Canada
- Stratford, Prince Edward Island, Canada
- Stratford, New Zealand
- Stratford-upon-Avon, England, United Kingdom

Torrington

- Changzhou, China

Trumbull

- Xinyi, China

Waterbury

- Pontelandolfo, Italy
- Struga, North Macedonia

West Hartford

- Afula, Israel

Westport

- Marigny-le-Lozon, France
- Saint Petersburg, Russia
- Yangzhou, China

Wethersfield

- Nagayo, Japan

== Maine ==
Bangor

- Carasque (Arcatao), El Salvador
- Saint John, Canada

Bath

- Tsugaru, Japan

Brunswick

- Trinidad, Cuba

Farmington

- Lac-Mégantic, Canada

Old Orchard Beach

- Mimizan, France

Portland

- Arkhangelsk, Russia
- Cap-Haïtien, Haiti
- Garissa Township, Kenya
- Mytilene, Greece
- Shinagawa (Tokyo), Japan

Topsfield

- Toppesfield, England, United Kingdom

Waterville

- Kotlas, Russia

== Massachusetts ==
Amesbury

- Esabalu, Kenya

Amherst

- Kanegasaki, Japan
- Nyeri, Kenya
- La Paz Centro, Nicaragua

Andover

- Andover, England, United Kingdom

Arlington

- Nagaokakyō, Japan
- (Republic of Ireland) Portarlington, Ireland
- Teosinte (San Francisco Morazán), El Salvador

Barnstable

- Barnstaple, England, United Kingdom

Billerica

- Billericay, England, United Kingdom

Boston

- Barcelona, Spain
- Beira, Mozambique
- Belfast, Northern Ireland, United Kingdom
- Hangzhou, China
- Kyoto, Japan
- Melbourne, Australia
- Padua, Italy
- Praia, Cape Verde
- Sekondi-Takoradi, Ghana
- Strasbourg, France
- Taipei, Taiwan

Brewster

- Budleigh Salterton, England, United Kingdom

Brockton

- Mosteiros, Cape Verde
- São Felipe, Cape Verde

Brookline

- Quezalguaque, Nicaragua

Cambridge

- Les Cayes, Haiti
- Coimbra, Portugal
- Gaeta, Italy
- (Republic of Ireland) Galway, Ireland
- San José Las Flores, El Salvador
- Tsukuba, Japan
- Yerevan, Armenia

Concord

- Nanae, Japan
- Saint-Mandé, France

Dartmouth

- Dartmouth, England, United Kingdom
- Lagoa, Portugal
- Nordeste, Portugal
- Povoação, Portugal

Fairhaven

- Lagoa, Portugal
- Tosashimizu, Japan

Fall River

- Lagoa, Portugal
- Ponta Delgada, Portugal
- Ribeira Grande, Portugal

Fitchburg

- Kleve, Germany
- Kokkola, Finland

Framingham

- Governador Valadares, Brazil
- Lomonosov, Russia

Gloucester

- Lunenburg, Canada
- Shelburne, Canada
- Tamano, Japan

Great Barrington

- Fada N'gourma, Burkina Faso
- Ingersoll, Canada

Holyoke

- Svaliava, Ukraine
- (Republic of Ireland) Tralee, Ireland

Hudson

- Vila do Porto, Portugal

Lanesborough

- (Republic of Ireland) Lanesborough–Ballyleague, Ireland

Lexington

- Antony, France

Lowell

- Bamenda, Cameroon
- Barclayville, Liberia
- Berdiansk, Ukraine
- Kalamata, Greece
- Nairobi, Kenya
- (Republic of Ireland) Limerick, Ireland
- Lobito, Angola
- Phnom Penh, Cambodia
- Saint-Dié-des-Vosges, France
- Winneba, Ghana

Mansfield

- Mansfield, England, United Kingdom

Marblehead

- Grasse, France

Marlborough

- Akiruno, Japan

Medford

- Nobeoka, Japan

Nantucket

- Beaune, France

New Bedford

- Derry, Northern Ireland, United Kingdom
- Grimsby, England, United Kingdom
- Figueira da Foz, Portugal
- Funchal, Portugal
- Horta, Portugal
- Ílhavo, Portugal
- São Vicente, Cape Verde
- Tosashimizu, Japan
- Utqiagvik, United States
- (Republic of Ireland) Youghal, Ireland

Newburyport

- Bura, Kenya

Newton

- San Donato Val di Comino, Italy
- San Juan del Sur, Nicaragua

North Adams

- Tremosine sul Garda, Italy

Pittsfield

- (Republic of Ireland) Ballina, Ireland
- Cava de' Tirreni, Italy
- Larreynaga, Nicaragua

Plymouth

- Plymouth, England, United Kingdom
- Shichigahama, Japan

Rehoboth

- Lagoa, Portugal

Revere

- Date, Japan

Salem

- Ōta (Tokyo), Japan

Scituate

- Santa Catarina do Fogo, Cape Verde
- Sucy-en-Brie, France
- (Republic of Ireland) West Cork, Ireland

Somerville

- Gaeta, Italy
- Nordeste, Portugal
- Tiznit, Morocco
- Yucuaiquín, El Salvador

Springfield

- Bracigliano, Italy
- Takikawa, Japan
- (Republic of Ireland) Tralee, Ireland

Sturbridge

- Stourbridge, England, United Kingdom

Taunton

- Angra do Heroísmo, Portugal
- Lagoa, Portugal
- Taunton, England, United Kingdom

Watertown

- Nueva Esperanza (Jiquilisco), El Salvador

Winchester

- Saint-Germain-en-Laye, France

Worcester

- Afula, Israel
- Piraeus, Greece
- Pushkin, Russia
- Worcester, England, United Kingdom

== New Hampshire ==
Concord

- Agua Caliente, El Salvador

Hanover

- Joigny, France
- Nihonmatsu, Japan

Keene

- Einbeck, Germany

Manchester

- Neustadt an der Weinstraße, Germany
- Taichung, Taiwan

Nashua

- Mysore, India

Portsmouth

- Agadir, Morocco
- Carrickfergus, Northern Ireland, United Kingdom
- Kitase, Ghana
- Nichinan, Japan
- Pärnu, Estonia
- Severodvinsk, Russia

Rye

- Rye, England, United Kingdom

== Rhode Island ==
Bristol

- Lagoa, Portugal

Coventry

- Coventry, England, United Kingdom
- Selwyn, New Zealand

Cranston

- Itri, Italy

Cumberland

- Penalva do Castelo, Portugal

East Providence

- Ribeira Grande, Portugal

Johnston

- Panni, Italy

Newport

- Imperia, Italy
- (Republic of Ireland) Kinsale, Ireland
- Ponta Delgada, Portugal
- Saint John, Canada
- Shimoda, Japan
- Skiathos, Greece

Pawtucket

- Belper, England, United Kingdom

Providence

- (Republic of Ireland) Athlone, Ireland
- Guatemala City, Guatemala
- Praia, Cape Verde
- Santo Domingo, Dominican Republic
- Zhuhai, China

West Warwick

- Fornelli, Italy

== Vermont ==
Bennington

- Somotillo, Nicaragua

Burlington

- Arad, Israel
- Bethlehem, Palestine
- Honfleur, France
- Moss Point, United States
- Puerto Cabezas, Nicaragua

Hartford

- Cenon, France

Rutland

- Hanamaki, Japan
