= List of mayors of Taunton, Massachusetts =

List of mayors of Taunton

This is a list of mayors of Taunton in the U.S. state of Massachusetts. Taunton was led by a Board of Selectmen from 1639 until its re-incorporation as a city in 1864. The first city government was inaugurated on January 2, 1865.

#	Mayor	Term Began	Term Ended	Notes
1st	Edmund H. Bennett	January 2, 1865	June 19, 1867	First mayor of Taunton; resigned June 19, 1867.
2nd	Stephen H. Rhodes	June 19, 1867	1870	
3rd	Daniel L. Mitchell	1870	1873	
4th	William H. Fox	1873	1874	
5th	George H. Babbitt	1874	1876	
6th	Onias S. Paige	1877	1879	
7th	Charles F. Johnson	1880	1882	
8th	Horatio Cushman	1883		
9th	Charles Hanson	1884	1885	
10th	Richard Henry Hall	1886	1886	
11th	Everett D. Godfrey	1887		
12th	Richard Henry Hall	1888	1889	
13th	Arthur Alger	1890		
14th	Francis Babbitt	1891	1892	
15th	Willis Hodgman	1894		
16th	Charles A. Reed	1895		
17th	Benjamin Morris	1896		
18th	Nathaniel J.W. Fish	1897	1899	
19th	Arthur Alger	1900		
20th	John O'Hearn	1901		
21st	Richard Everett Warner	1902	1905	
22nd	John H. Eldredge	1905	1906	
23rd	John B. Tracey	1906	1907	
24th	Edgar Crossman	1908	1909	
25th	William S. Woods	1910	1912	
26th	Nathaniel Jarvis Wyeth Fish	1912	1916	
27th	William Flood	1916	1919	His son, Joseph E. Flood, Sr., was Mayor in 1970–1972
28th	Leo Coughlin	1919	1925	
29th	Andrew McGraw	1926	1929	
30th	Wllis K. Hodgman, Jr.	1930	1932	
31st	Andrew McGraw	1932	1935	
32nd	Arthur Poole	1936	1939	
33rd	John Fitzgerald	1940	February 20, 1941	Died in Office
Acting	Harold B. Johnston	February 20, 1941	April 30, 1941	
34th	Merrill Aldrich	April 30, 1941	November 25, 1946	Won special election to succeed Fitzgerald. Resigned to serve prison sentence for Cohabitation.
Acting	Frederick H. Smith	November 25, 1946	February 7, 1947	
35th	John F. Parker	1947	1953	Won special election to succeed Aldrich.
36th	Joseph C. Chamberlain	1953	1960	
37th	Bernard F. Cleary	1960	1963	Died in office shortly before completing his final term.
38th	Benjamin A. Friedman	1963	1970	
39th	Joseph E. Flood	1970	1972	
40th	Rudolph H. De Silva	1972	1974	
41st	Theodore J. Aleixo, Jr.	1974	1976	
42nd	Benjamin A. Friedman	1976	1978	
43rd	Joseph L. Amaral	1978	1982	
44th	Richard Johnson	1982	1992	
45th	Robert G. Nunes	1992	1999	
46th	Thaddeus M. Strojny	2000	2003	
47th	Robert G. Nunes	2004	March 12, 2007	Resigned to serve as Director of Municipal Affairs for Gov. Deval Patrick. First mayor of Taunton to leave the office voluntarily before his term ended.
48th	Charles E. Crowley	March 12, 2007	January 2, 2012	
49th	Thomas Hoye, Jr.	January 2, 2012	November 13, 2019	Resigned to become interim Register of Probate for Bristol County, appointed by Gov. Charlie Baker.
Acting	Jeffrey Postell	November 13, 2019	November 23, 2019	Taunton city council president; became acting mayor until the council voted to select one of its members as acting mayor.
50th	Donald Cleary	November 23, 2019	January 6, 2020	City councilor, elected by a 5–4 vote of the council to serve the balance of Mayor Hoye's term. Pursuant to the City Charter, if the office of mayor becomes vacant, the city council will select one of its members by a majority vote to serve as mayor for the remainder of that term.
51st	Shaunna O'Connell	January 6, 2020	Incumbent	First elected female mayor of Taunton. Former State Representative for the 3rd Bristol district, which includes most of Taunton (wards 1, 2, 5, 7, and 8, as well as precinct A of ward 3) and precinct 6 of Easton.

== Gallery ==
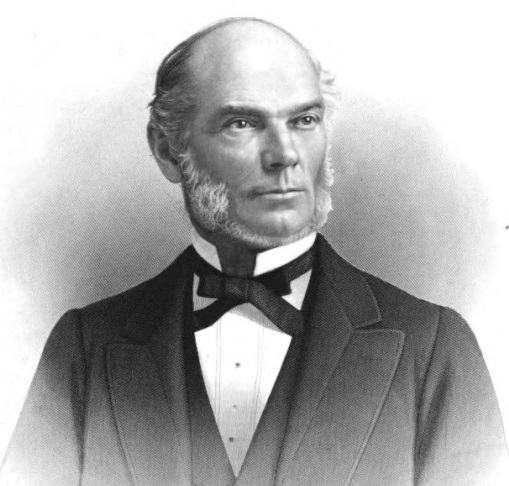
Edmund H. Bennett
First mayor of Taunton

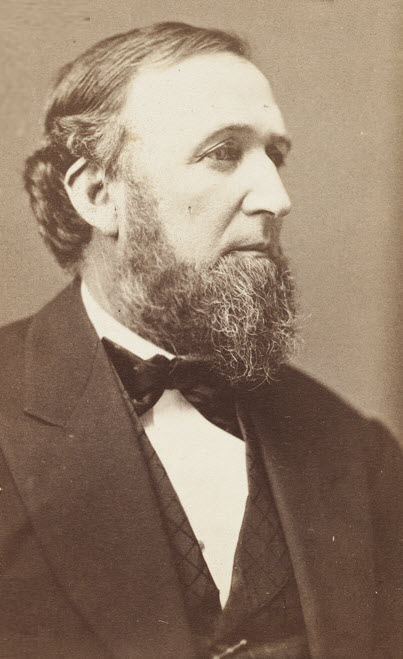
Stephen H. Rhodes
Second mayor of Taunton

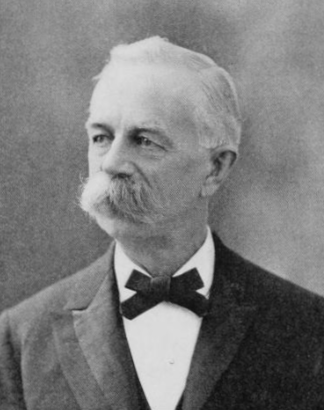
William H. Fox
Fourth mayor of Taunton

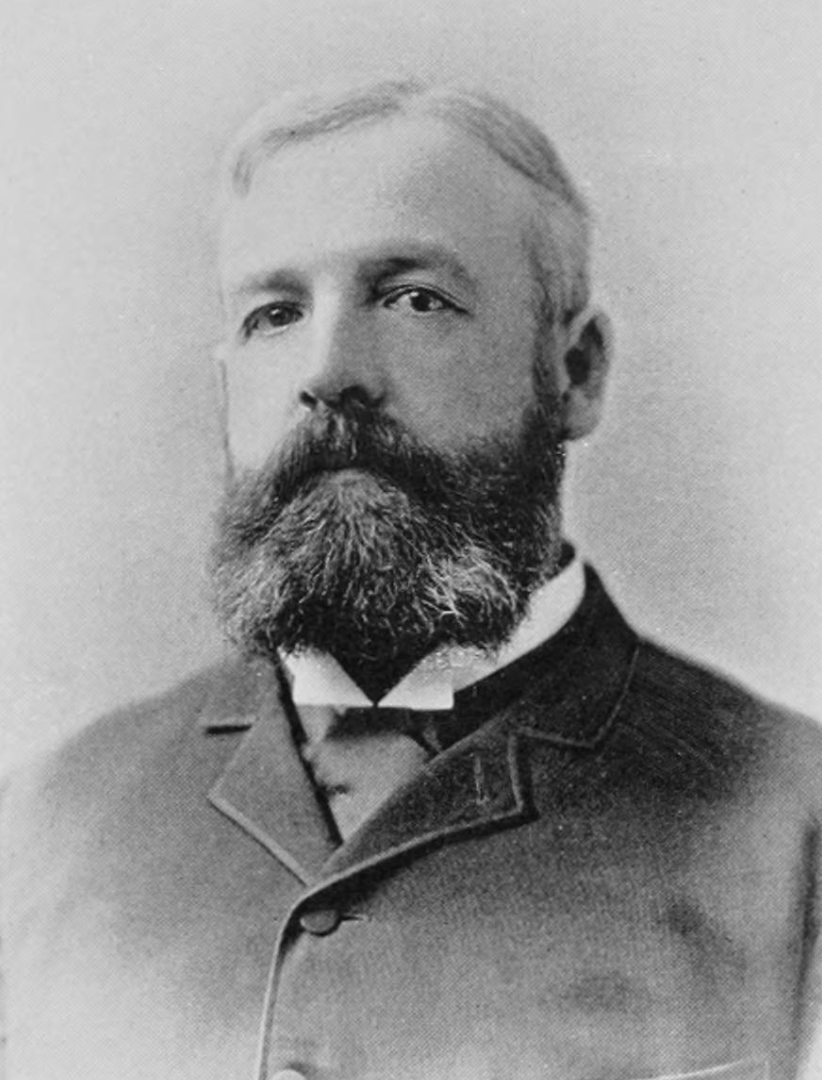
Francis Babbitt
14th mayor of Taunton

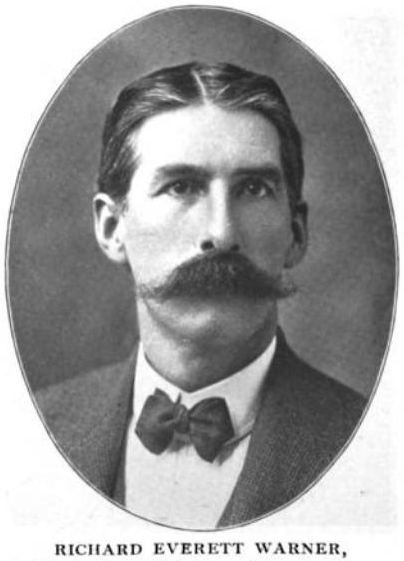
Richard Everett Warner
21st mayor of Taunton

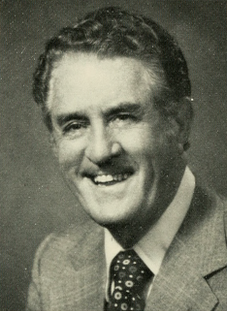
John F. Parker
35th mayor of Taunton

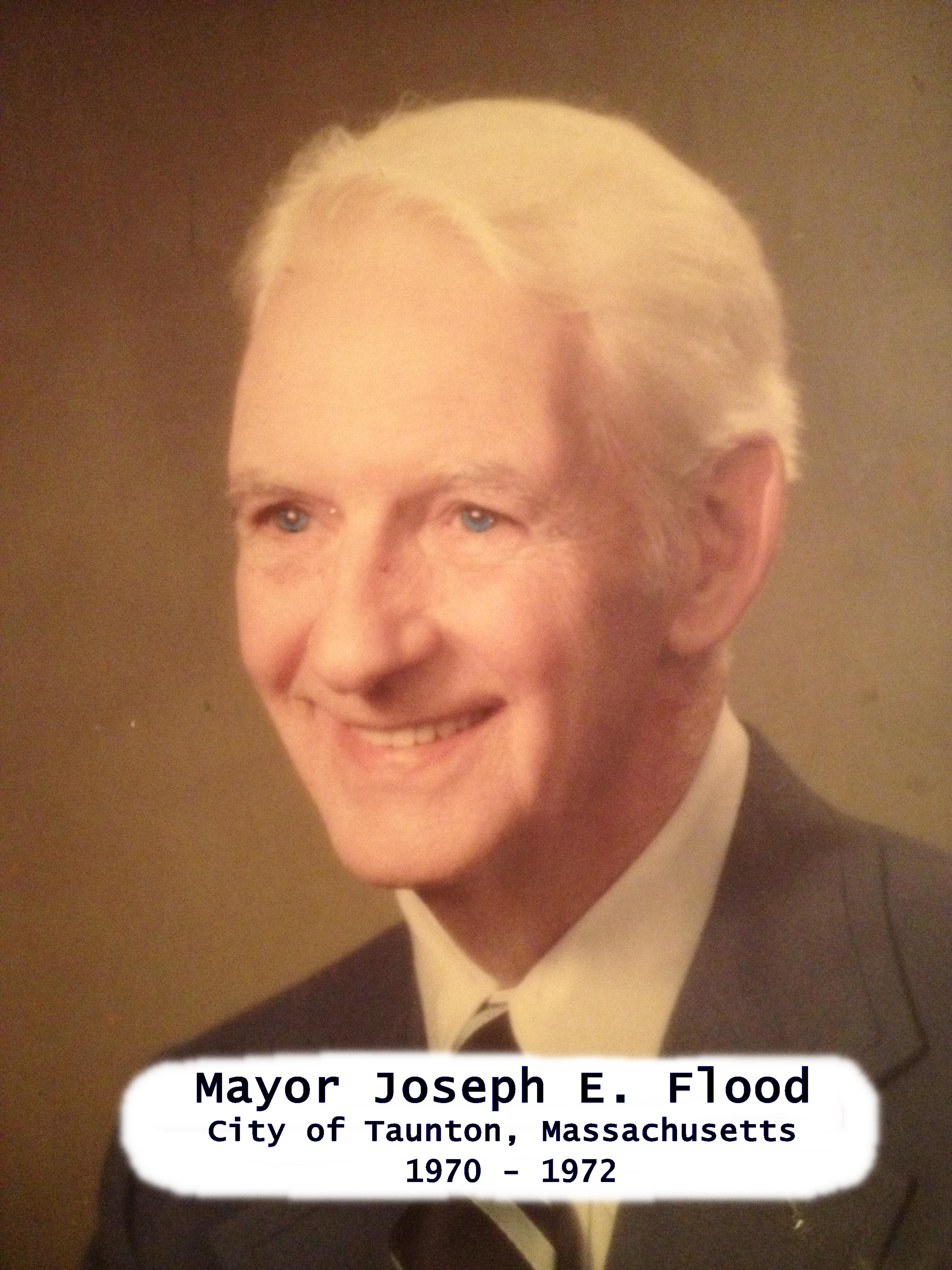
Joseph E. Flood
39th mayor of Taunton

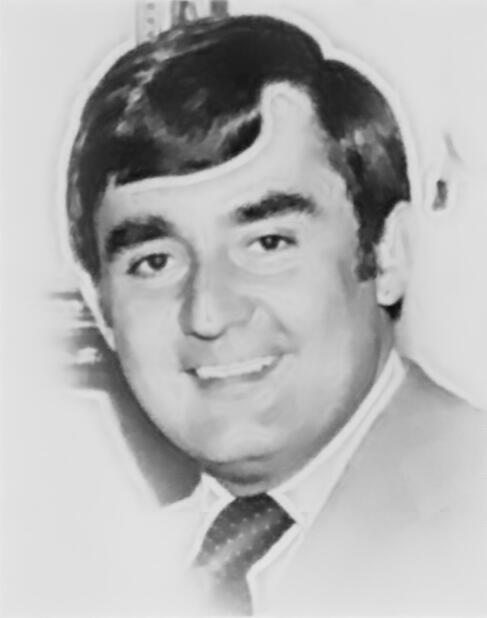
Theodore J. Aleixo Jr.
41st mayor of Taunton

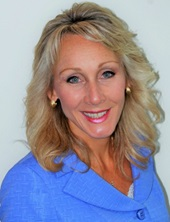
Shaunna O'Connell
51st mayor of Taunton
