= Lisa Field =

American politician

Member of the Massachusetts House of Representatives from the 3rd Bristol district
- Incumbent
- Assumed office July 16, 2025
- Preceded by: Carol Doherty

Personal details
- Party: Democratic
- Website: Campaign website

Lisa Field is an American politician and labor organizer who serves as a member of the Massachusetts House of Representatives for the 3rd Bristol district. A member of the Democratic Party, Field was first elected in a special election in 2025 by a margin of 15 votes.

Field is a trade unionist from Taunton, Massachusetts. She previously worked for the Massachusetts Nurses Association as an associate director.

== Committee Assignments ==
For the 2025-26 Session, Field sits on the following committees in the House:

- Joint Committee on Aging and Independence
- Joint Committee on Bonding, Capital Expenditures and State Assets
- Joint Committee on Children, Families and Persons with Disabilities
- Joint Committee on Consumer Protection and Professional Licensure

== See also ==
- 2025–2026 Massachusetts legislature
- 2025 United States state legislative elections
