= Francis Babbitt =

American politician

Francis Sanford Babbitt
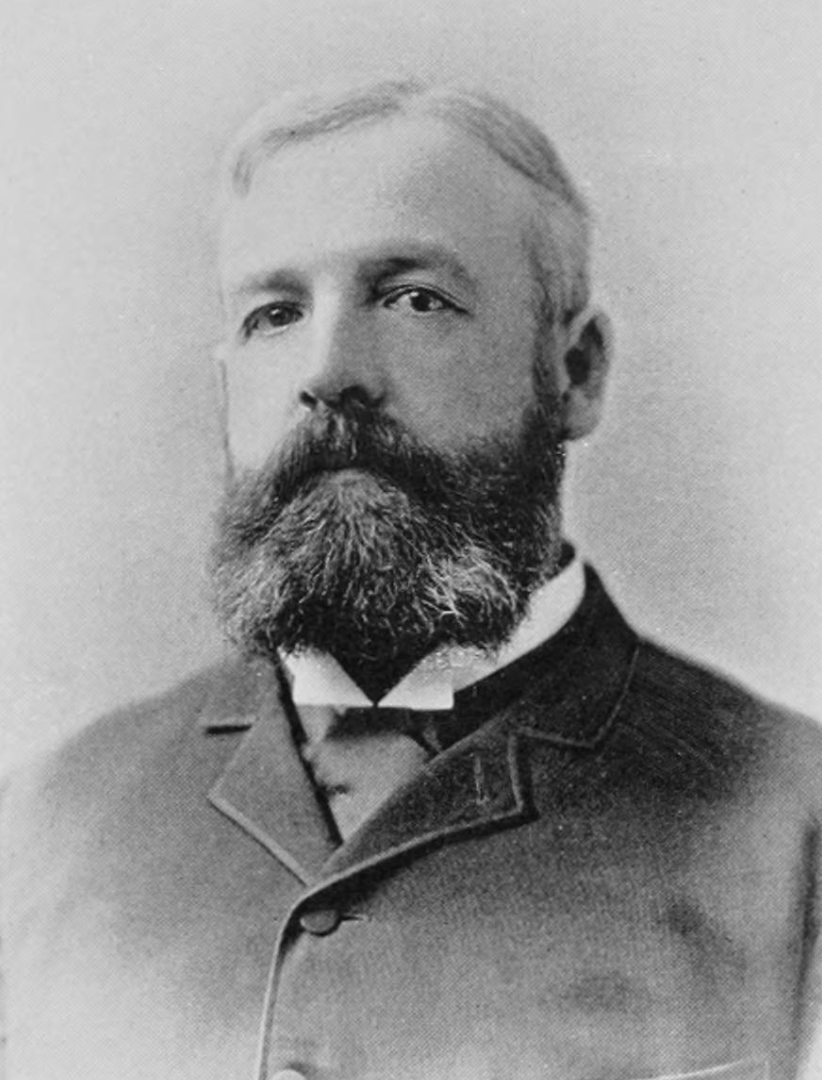

14th Mayor of Taunton, Massachusetts
- In office 1891–1893
- Preceded by: Arthur Alger
- Succeeded by: Willis Hodgman
- Majority: 193 (1890)

Chief of Police of Taunton, Massachusetts
- In office 1897–1900

Member of the Taunton, Massachusetts Board of Aldermen
- In office 1887–1887

Chairman of the Bristol County, Massachusetts County Commission
- In office 1888–1893

Member of the Bristol County, Massachusetts County Commission
- In office 1887–1893

Member of the Massachusetts House of Representatives
- In office 1882–1883

Personal details
- Born: December 22, 1843 Taunton, Massachusetts
- Died: August 22, 1917 Taunton, Massachusetts
- Spouse: Abbie L. Hitch
- Children: A. Louise Babbitt

Military service
- Allegiance: United States of America; Union
- Branch/service: United States Army
- Years of service: 1862; August 1862-June 28, 1865
- Unit: Company F, 4th Regiment; Massachusetts Volunteer Militia; Company F, 39th Regiment; Massachusetts Volunteer Militia
- Commands: United States Signal Corps
- Battles/wars: American Civil War

Francis Sanford Babbitt (December 22, 1843 – August 22, 1917) was a Massachusetts politician who served as the fourteenth Mayor of Taunton, Massachusetts.

Babbitt was born in Taunton, Massachusetts to George H. and Seraphene S. Babbitt on December 22, 1843.

== Mayor of Taunton ==
Babbitt ran for the Mayor of Taunton in 1890. On December 2, 1890, he was elected Mayor as the candidate of the Beau. and Citizen party by a plurality of 193 over Brown, (Ind.).

== Notes ==
Political offices
Preceded by Arthur Alger	14th Mayor of Taunton, Massachusetts; 1891 - 1892	Succeeded by Willis Hodgman
