= William H. Fox =

American politician

William Henry Fox
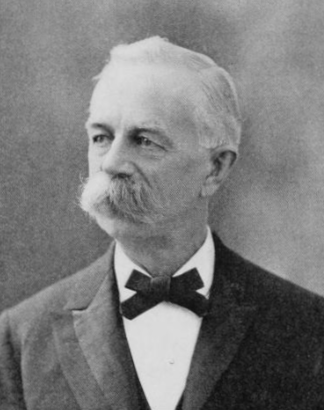

Presiding Justice of the First Bristol District Court
- In office 1875 – May 14, 1913
- Preceded by: New office

4th Mayor of Taunton, Massachusetts
- In office 1873–1874
- Preceded by: Daniel L. Mitchell
- Succeeded by: George H. Babbitt

Justice of the Taunton, Massachusetts Municipal Court
- In office August 1864 – 1875
- Appointed by: John Albion Andrew
- Succeeded by: Office abolished

Personal details
- Born: August 29, 1837 Taunton, Massachusetts
- Died: May 14, 1913 (aged 75) Taunton, Massachusetts
- Spouse: Anna M. Anthony
- Education: Harvard, 1858

William Henry Fox (August 29, 1837 – May 14, 1913) was a Massachusetts lawyer, jurist, and politician who served as the fourth Mayor of Taunton, Massachusetts, and as the Presiding Justice of the First Bristol District Court.

== Notes ==
Legal offices
Preceded by None	Presiding Justice of the First Bristol District Court; 1875-May 14, 1913	Succeeded by
Political offices
Preceded by Daniel L. Mitchell	4th Mayor of Taunton, Massachusetts; 1873-1874	Succeeded by George H. Babbitt
