= Massachusetts House of Representatives' 3rd Bristol district =

American legislative district

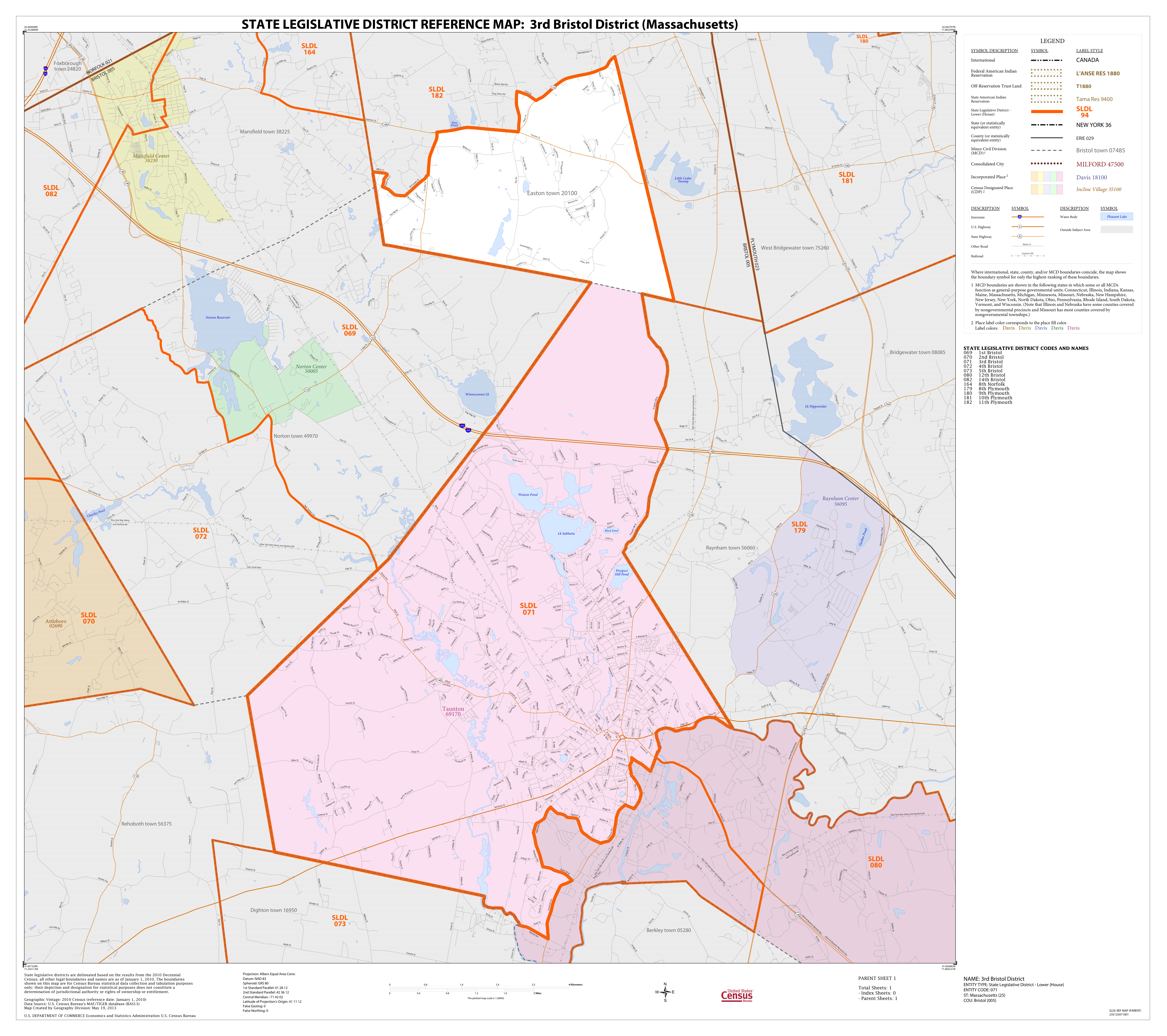
Map of Massachusetts House of Representatives' 3rd Bristol district, based on the 2010 United States census.

Massachusetts House of Representatives' 3rd Bristol district is one of 160 districts included in the lower house of the Massachusetts General Court. It covers part of Bristol County. Democrat Lisa Field of Taunton has represented the district since July 2025.

== Towns represented ==
The district includes the following localities:

- part of Easton
- part of Taunton

The current district geographic boundary overlaps with those of the Massachusetts Senate's Norfolk, Bristol and Plymouth and 1st Plymouth and Bristol districts.

=== Former locales ===
The district previously covered Raynham, circa 1872.

== Representatives ==
- Horace D. Howard, circa 1858
- John D. G. Williams, circa 1859
- Rollin H. Babbitt, circa 1888
- Frederick Stanley Hall, circa 1888
- William L. White, circa 1888
- Matthew A. Higgins, circa 1920
- Francis X. Casey, circa 1951
- Thomas D. Lopes, circa 1975
- Theodore J. Aleixo Jr.
- Marc R. Pacheco, January 1989 – January 1993
- James H. Fagan, 1993–2011
- Shaunna L. O'Connell, 2011-January 2020
- Carol Doherty, 2020-2025
- Lisa Field, 2025-present

== See also ==
- List of Massachusetts House of Representatives elections
- Other Bristol County districts of the Massachusetts House of Representatives: 1st, 2nd, 4th, 5th, 6th, 7th, 8th, 9th, 10th, 11th, 12th, 13th, 14th
- List of Massachusetts General Courts
- List of former districts of the Massachusetts House of Representatives

== Representatives ==
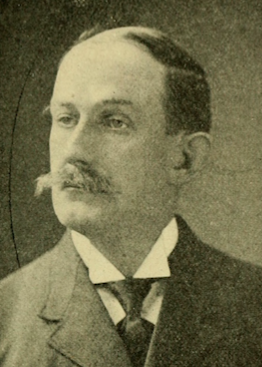
Michael Kenney

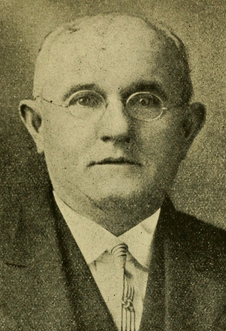
Matthew Higgins

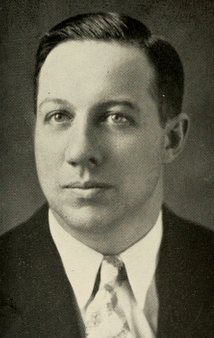
Joseph Dooley

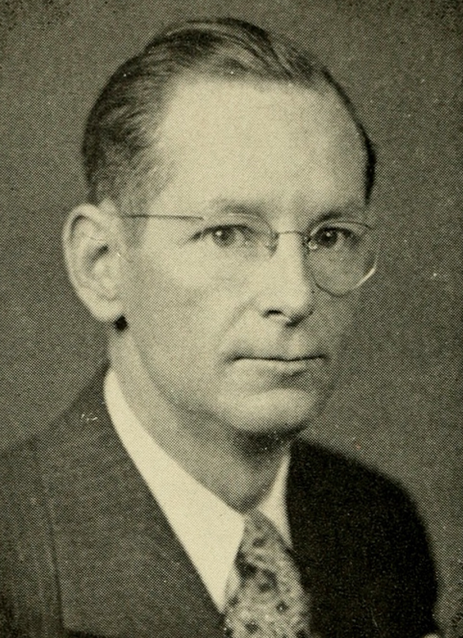
Francis Casey

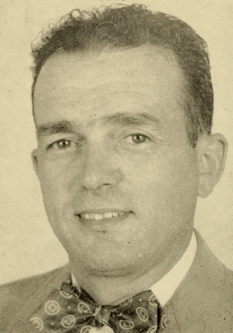
Frank Rico

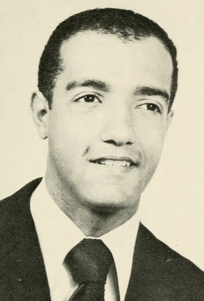
Thomas Lopes

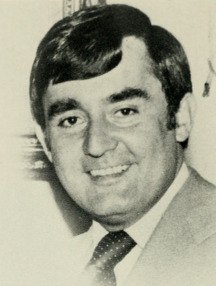
Theodore Aleixo

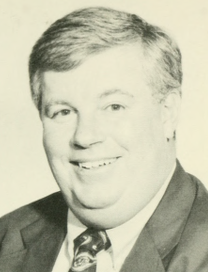
James Fagan
