= James H. Fagan =

American politician

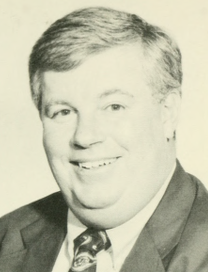
- Portrait of James H. Fagan

Member of the Massachusetts House of Representatives from the 3rd Bristol district
- In office 1993–2011
- Preceded by: Marc Pacheco
- Succeeded by: Shaunna O'Connell

Personal details
- Born: October 13, 1947 (age 78) Taunton, Massachusetts
- Party: Democratic
- Education: Bridgewater State College; Suffolk University Law School
- Occupation: Attorney

James H. "Jim" Fagan (born October 13, 1947, in Taunton, Massachusetts) is an American attorney and politician who represented the 3rd Bristol District in the Massachusetts House of Representatives from 1993 to 2011.

== Education and career ==
Fagan graduated with a BA from Bridgewater State College in 1969. Between 1969 and 1970, he taught at Mulcahey Elementary School in Taunton, where he was also a coach. In 1973, Fagan earned his JD from Suffolk University Law School. After joining a private law practice for two years, Fagan became a Bristol County assistant district attorney, serving at the Taunton District Court; he would hold this position from 1975 to 1976.

Following his term as assistant district attorney, Fagan returned to private practice in 1976 as a partner of Fagan & Goldrick, PC. Fagan has stated that he represents “serious people,” and he has also remarked that “the people I represent know how to bleeping kill a guy”.

Fagan is known for his off-the-cuff remarks, illustrated by his characterization in the Boston Herald as “an outspoken lawmaker and defense lawyer.” In one instance, Fagan's local newspaper, the Taunton Gazette notes that Fagan's “brash and quick wit” is viewed by some observers as a “propensity for occasional over-the-top outbursts.”

== Massachusetts House of Representatives ==
=== 1992 ===
In 1992, incumbent Representative Marc Pacheco decided to run for Massachusetts Senate, leaving open his 3rd Bristol District seat in the Massachusetts House of Representatives. At the time, the 3rd Bristol district included all of wards 1, 2, 3, 4, 5, 7, and 8 in the city of Taunton.

Fagan ran in the Democratic Party primary for the seat, facing opponents Carol Doherty, Gail Tardo, Alfred Baptista Jr, and George Bertoldo. In a close race, Fagan won the nomination with 2,106 votes to Doharty's 2,024 and Tardo's 1,993.

Fagan faced Republican Audrey Zrebiec in the general election. He defeated her by a 35-point margin, garnering 10,870 votes to Zrebiec's 5,130 votes. This would prove to be Fagan's most competitive election for nearly two decades.

=== 1994 ===
Due to the results of the 1990 United States census, the boundaries of Fagan's districts were altered slightly prior to the 1994 election. The newly drawn district, still wholly within the city of Taunton, now included all of wards 1, 2, 3, 4, and 5, as well as ward 7, precinct A; and ward 8, precinct B. Running for re-election, Fagan faced no opposition in the Democratic primary or the general election, and thus secured a second term in the House.

=== 1996 ===
In 1996, Fagan again faced no opposition in the primary or general election, and was re-elected to a third term.

=== 1998 ===
Fagan's path to a fourth term was easy again in 1998, as he was re-elected without any opposition in the primary or general election for the third consecutive cycle.

=== 2000 ===
In 2000, Fagan again faced no opposition in the primary or general election, securing a fifth term with relative ease.

=== 2002 ===
As a result of the 2000 United States census, the district boundaries were somewhat changed prior to the 2002 election. The new 3rd Bristol district, which was still completely within the city of Taunton, now included all of wards 2, 3, 5, 7, and 8, as well as ward 1, precinct B.
Fagan again faced no opposition in the primary election, and only minor opposition in the general. He received 7,809 votes compared to 45 votes for all other candidates, sending him to a sixth term in the House.

=== 2004 ===
Seeking a seventh term in 2004, Fagan faced only trivial opposition in both the primary and general elections, winning with over 99% of the vote in both contests.

=== 2006 ===
Fagan yet again faced only minor opposition in the 2006 primary and general campaigns, prevailing with over 99% of voters for both elections.

=== 2008 ===
In 2008, Fagan sought re-election to a ninth term in the House. He faced minor opposition in both the primary and general, and claimed victory with over 98% of votes in both elections.

=== 2010 ===
Fagan ran for re-election to a tenth term in the House in 2010. In the primary election, he faced no major opposition, and won with 97.9% of the votes cast. However, for the first time since his initial election in 1992, Fagan faced serious opposition in the general election. His Republican opponent was court reporter Shaunna O'Connell.
O'Connell cited comments that Fagan had made on the House floor in 2008 as her inspiration to challenge Fagan. During debate on Jessica's Law, a bill which would set mandatory 20-year prison sentences for child rapists, Fagan noted that the law would require the young victims to take the stand. As a defense attorney, Fagan argued, he would have no choice but to interrogate the victims, stating,

I'm gonna rip them apart. I'm going to make sure that the rest of their life is ruined, that when they’re 8 years old, they throw up; when they’re 12 years old, they won’t sleep; when they’re 19 years old, they’ll have nightmares and they’ll never have a relationship with anybody.

Fagan's comments drew national outrage, yet Fagan himself defended the comments as hyperbole intended to demonstrate the negative consequences of the bill. Nevertheless, O'Connell sought to make the issue central to her campaign; a mailer distributed to voters by her campaign included an audio clip of Fagan making the infamous remarks. O'Connell also questioned whether Fagan's job as a defense attorney was a conflict of interest, as Fagan would be defending people from laws he had a role in crafting. She referenced Fagan's previous support for tough-on-gun stances, yet noted the irony that Fagan would then request leniency for a client charged with illegal firearm possession. In the same interview, O'Connell went a step further, asserting that "intimidating, bullying and unnecessarily going after people is classic Jim Fagan," a straightforward and personal attack on Fagan's well-documented outspoken nature.
The contentious campaign came to a head when, during a debate between the candidates, Fagan questioned O'Connell's ability to count, a charge that was viewed by some as sexist. During the same debate, O'Connell refused to look at Fagan, and took her cell phone out while he made his closing remarks. The Taunton Gazette endorsed Fagan in the days prior to the election, citing his experience in the House and track record as a lifelong Tauntonian with deep ties to the community.
On election night, O'Connell narrowly defeated Fagan by a razor-thin 44 vote margin. Both candidates requested a recount, the results of which showed O'Connell indeed defeating Fagan, albeit by a slimmer margin of only 31 votes. With the victory, O'Connell became the first Republican to represent the 3rd Bristol district in at least 40 years.

== Personal life ==
Fagan is a lifelong resident of Taunton. He is married to Christine (née Lussier), a member of the Taunton School Committee. Together, he and Christine had six sons, Michael, Patrick, Daniel, Kevin, Matthew, and James. Fagan is a Roman Catholic.

=== Patrick Fagan shooting incident ===
In January 2002, Fagan's son Patrick was shot in the aftermath of a “feud.” Fagan went on the record admonishing his son and criticizing him for being unemployed.

=== Death of Kevin Fagan ===
In the early morning hours of 3 February 2008, Fagan's son Kevin was killed after accidentally slipping and falling from the Washington Bridge in East Providence, Rhode Island, which was under construction at the time. Representative Fagan lamented, “this is just an absolutely devastating loss to our family.”
