= Carol Doherty =

Massachusetts politician (1942–2025)

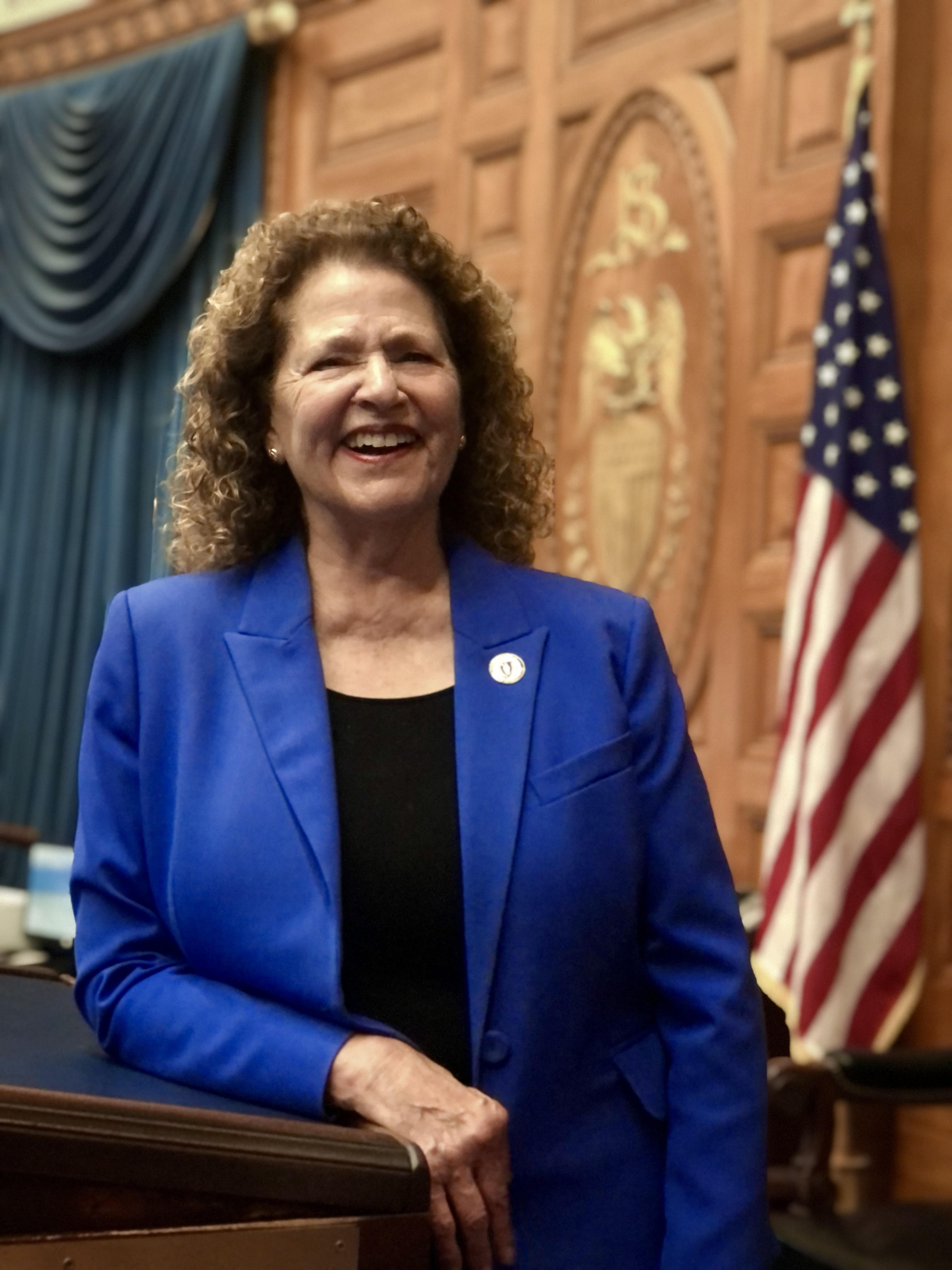

Member of the Massachusetts House of Representatives from the 3rd Bristol district
- In office June 10, 2020 – February 15, 2025
- Preceded by: Shaunna O'Connell
- Succeeded by: Lisa Field

Personal details
- Born: February 28, 1942 Fall River, Massachusetts, U.S.
- Died: February 15, 2025 (aged 82) Taunton, Massachusetts, U.S.
- Party: Democratic
- Spouse: Dennis Cook
- Education: Boston University (BS); Bridgewater State College (MEd)
- Website: Campaign website (archived)

Carol A. Doherty (February 28, 1942 – February 15, 2025) was an American educator and politician who served as a member of the Massachusetts House of Representatives from the 3rd Bristol district. A member of the Democratic Party, she previously served as president of the Massachusetts Teachers Association and five terms on the Taunton School Committee.

== Early life and education ==
Doherty was born on February 28, 1942, in Fall River, Massachusetts. A 1959 graduate of Westport High School, Doherty received a bachelor's degree in business administration from Boston University and a master's degree in education from Bridgewater State College.

Early in her career, Doherty was a third grade teacher in New Bedford and Taunton before becoming a guidance counselor. During this time, she served as president of the Massachusetts Teachers Association for four years. She would later work as an education and political consultant and hold positions at Lesley College and Northeastern University.

== Political career ==
=== Early political involvement ===
In 1988, Doherty ran for the Massachusetts House of Representatives from the 3rd Bristol district. She lost the Democratic primary to Marc Pacheco, who would serve two terms in the House and sixteen terms in the Senate.

In 1992, with Pacheco running for Senate, Doherty again sought the Democratic nomination for the 3rd Bristol district. She placed second among five candidates, falling 82 votes short of Pacheco's eventual successor James H. Fagan.

=== Taunton School Committee ===
Doherty was elected to the Taunton School Committee in 2011, placing second among eleven candidates. She would be reelected four times.

=== Massachusetts House of Representatives ===
In 2020, after incumbent Shaunna O'Connell was elected mayor of Taunton, Doherty again ran for the 3rd Bristol district. She defeated businessman Muzi Nazir in the special Democratic primary and Republican Kelly Dooner in the special election on June 2, 2020, which had been postponed due to the coronavirus pandemic. She was elected to a full term in November 2020 and again in 2022 and 2024.

In the House, Doherty introduced legislation to require public schools to offer courses in American Sign Language (ASL) and that those courses be counted for world language credit. She also introduced legislation to make training in CPR and AED usage a statewide high school graduation requirement. In the wake of the 2019 murder of Harmony Montgomery, Doherty introduced legislation alongside State Senator Michael Moore to create a "Harmony Montgomery Commission" to review Massachusetts' child welfare system.

In her 2025 State of the Commonwealth Address, Massachusetts Governor Maura Healey endorsed Doherty's American Sign Language Inclusion Act, saying "ASL is used by millions of Americans, and interpreters are in short supply. So we're going to work to get this done."

=== Legislative Committees ===
==== 193rd General Court (2023–24) ====
- House Committee on Global Warming and Climate Change
- House Committee on Ways and Means
- Joint Committee on Bonding, Capital Expenditures and State Assets
- Joint Committee on Children, Families and Persons with Disabilities
- Joint Committee on Election Laws
- Joint Committee on Ways and Means

== Personal life ==
Doherty was married to Dennis Cook. She resided in Taunton from 1965.

For over 17 years, she co-hosted Silver City Meetinghouse, a local radio show on WVBF, alongside co-host Barry Sanders.

Doherty served on the boards of TRIUMPH Inc., the Downtown Taunton Foundation, and the Taunton Area Community Table. She was the founder of the Taunton Community Gardens, and was an active member of the Taunton Civic Chorus, the Easton Lions Club, Taunton Elks Lodge #150, the Prince Henry Society of Taunton, the Kiwanis Club of Taunton, and the Rotary Club of Taunton.

== Illness and death ==
Doherty was diagnosed with pancreatic cancer in 2024. Governor Maura Healey extended her best wishes to Doherty in her 2025 State of the Commonwealth Address.

On February 5, 2025, Healey swore Doherty in for her third term in a private ceremony at her home in Taunton, surrounded by family, friends, and colleagues. She died from pancreatic cancer on February 15, 2025, at the age of 82.

Her death drew remembrances from many Massachusetts politicians and public figures. Governor Maura Healey ordered flags across the Commonwealth to be lowered to half staff until February 28, 2025. She remembered Doherty as someone who "dedicated her life to helping children grow and succeed as an educator, a school committee member, and legislator." Speaker of the House Ronald Mariano remembered Doherty as "kind, passionate, and a fierce advocate for the residents of Taunton and Easton on Beacon Hill, [who] served them honorably until her final days." US Senator Ed Markey honored Doherty as "a joyful and compassionate champion for a better Commonwealth."

== Electoral history ==
Massachusetts State Representative 3rd Bristol District, General Election 2022
| Party | Candidate | Votes | % | ±% |
|---|---|---|---|---|
| Democratic | Carol A. Doherty | 8,011 | 57 | −1 |
| Republican | Christopher P. Coute | 6,036 | 43 | +1.1 |
| Total votes | | 14,488 | 100 | |
| Democratic hold | | | | |

Massachusetts State Representative 3rd Bristol District, General Election 2020
| Party | Candidate | Votes | % | ±% |
|---|---|---|---|---|
| Democratic | Carol A. Doherty | 11,505 | 58 | +0.9 |
| Republican | Kelly A. Dooner | 8,320 | 41.9 | −1 |
| Total votes | | 20,967 | 99.9 | |
| Democratic hold | | | | |

Massachusetts State Representative 3rd Bristol District, Special Election 2020
| Party | Candidate | Votes | % | ±% |
|---|---|---|---|---|
| Democratic | Carol A. Doherty | 2,195 | 57.1 | +18.6 |
| Republican | Kelly A. Dooner | 1,646 | 42.9 | −18.6 |
| Total votes | | 3,850 | 100.0 | |
| Democratic gain from Republican | | | | |

== See also ==
- 2019–2020 Massachusetts legislature
- 2021–2022 Massachusetts legislature
