= Marc Pacheco =

American politician (born 1952)

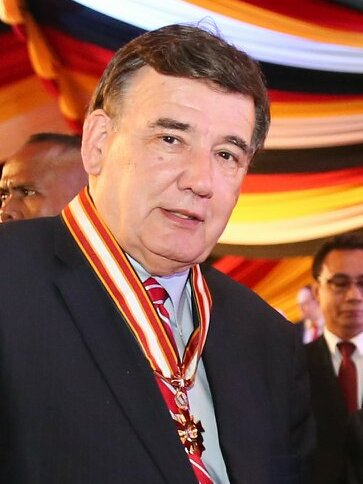
- Pacheco in 2019

President pro tempore of the Massachusetts Senate
- In office January 21, 2015 – March 20, 2019
- Preceded by: Richard T. Moore
- Succeeded by: Will Brownsberger

Member of the Massachusetts Senate from the 1st Plymouth and Bristol district
- In office January 1993 – January 2025
- Preceded by: Erving Wall
- Succeeded by: Kelly Dooner

Member of the Massachusetts House of Representatives from the 3rd Bristol district
- In office January 1989 – January 1993
- Preceded by: Theodore J. Aleixo Jr.
- Succeeded by: James H. Fagan

Personal details
- Born: October 29, 1952 (age 73) Taunton, Massachusetts, U.S.
- Party: Democratic
- Education: University of Massachusetts, Amherst (AS); New Hampshire University (BS); Suffolk University (MPA)

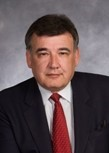
Official portrait

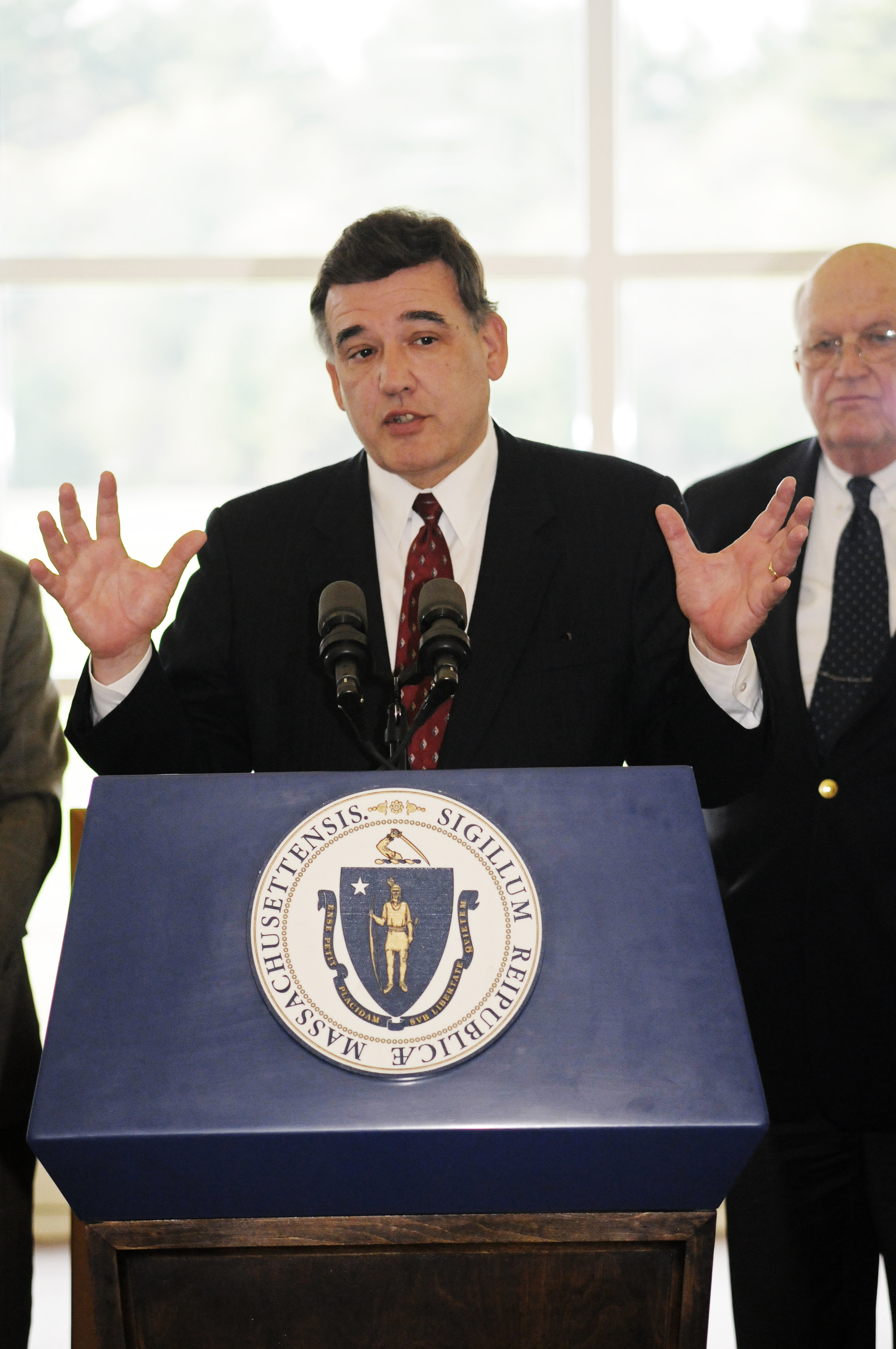
Pacheco in 2008

Marc R. Pacheco (born October 29, 1952) is an American state legislator who served as a member of the Massachusetts Senate from the 1st Plymouth and Bristol district from 1993 to 2025. A member of the Democratic Party, he previously represented the 3rd Bristol district in the Massachusetts House of Representatives from 1989 to 1993.

== Early life and education ==
Pacheco was born on October 29, 1952 in Taunton, Massachusetts to Emily L. Pacheco (née Henriques) and Richard Pacheco.

A graduate of Taunton High School, Pacheco received an associate degree from the Stockbridge School of Agriculture at the University of Massachusetts Amherst, a bachelor's degree from New Hampshire College (now Southern New Hampshire University), and a master's degree from Suffolk University.

== Political career ==
Pacheco entered politics in 1980 when he was elected to the Taunton School Committee. He served until 1989, including two years as chair from 1987 to 1988. From 1982 to 1988, he also served as chief assistant to Mayor Richard Johnson.

In 1988, with incumbent Theodore J. Aleixo Jr. running for Senate, Pacheco was elected to the 3rd Bristol district of the Massachusetts House of Representatives. He defeated fellow Taunton residents Carol Doherty and Gail Tardo in the Democratic primary and faced no opposition in the general election. Doherty would later be elected to the seat in a special election in 2020.

In 1992, Pacheco ran for Senate and defeated incumbent Republican Erving H. Wall Jr.

In 2001, Pacheco ran in the 9th congressional district special election caused by the death of Congressman Joe Moakley. He finished fourth in the Democratic primary with 13% of the vote, placing behind colleagues Brian A. Joyce, Cheryl Jacques, and the eventual winner Stephen Lynch.

In 2016, Pacheco served as a presidential elector, casting his vote for Hillary Clinton.

On February 13, 2024, Pacheco announced he would not seek another term.

=== Committee Assignments ===
==== 193rd General Court (2023-24) ====
- Chairperson, Senate Committee on Post Audit and Oversight
- Chairperson, Joint Committee on Emergency Preparedness and Management
- Vice Chair, Joint Committee on Telecommunications, Utilities and Energy
- Senate Committee on Global Warming and Climate Change
- Joint Committee on State Administration and Regulatory Oversight

== Personal life ==
Pacheco lives in Taunton with his wife Barbara, a few blocks from where he grew up.

== See also ==
- 2019–2020 Massachusetts legislature
- 2021–2022 Massachusetts legislature

Massachusetts Senate
Preceded by Richard T. Moore	President pro tempore of the Massachusetts Senate; 2015–2019	Succeeded by Will Brownsberger
