= Richard Johnson (mayor) =

City Manager of Lowell, Massachusetts
- In office 1991–1995
- Preceded by: James Campbell
- Succeeded by: Brian J. Martin

Mayor of Taunton, Massachusetts
- In office 1982–1992
- Preceded by: Joseph L. Amaral
- Succeeded by: Robert G. Nunes

Personal details
- Born: June 11, 1942 (age 84)
- Party: Democratic Party
- Education: Bridgewater State College

Richard Johnson (born June 11, 1942) is an American politician and city manager who served as Mayor of Taunton, Massachusetts and City Manager of Lowell, Massachusetts.

== Early life ==
Johnson spent his youth in Tyngsborough, Massachusetts and Dracut, Massachusetts. His father worked in a Lowell textile mill then served on the city's police force. The family moved to Taunton when Johnson was twelve and he played football at Taunton High School. One of his teammates was future Taunton mayor Theodore J. Aleixo Jr. Johnson attended Boston University and was a member of the Boston University Terriers football team. He graduated from Bridgewater State College.

== Career ==
=== Early career ===
From 1971 to 1975, Johnson worked in Taunton's recreation department. He then served as an administrative assistant to Mayor Aleixo. From 1976 to 1982, he was director of the Taunton Housing Authority.

=== Mayor of Taunton ===
In 1981, incumbent Mayor Joseph Amaral chose not to seek re-election and Johnson ran to succeed him. He finished first in the preliminary election with 4289 votes, defeating Amaral's administrative assistant Walter Precourt Jr. (2776 votes), City Councilman Tijuana Goldstein-Star (2729 votes), recent Syracuse University graduate David Goren (262 votes), and rock musician Russell N. Hurst (76 votes). He defeated Precourt in the general election 7266 votes to 6030.

During Johnson's first term, the city suffered economic misfortune as Parker Brothers and Paragon Gear shut down their Taunton plants. Although the city suffered through an economic slump and high unemployment during Johnson's early years as mayor, by 1987 unemployment in Taunton was at the lowest point on record. In 1986, GTE chose Taunton as the location for its new plant. In 1989, The Pyramid Companies announced plans to build a mall in Taunton, which would become the Silver City Galleria.

In 1990, Johnson prevented hip hop group 2 Live Crew from performing in Taunton, stating that he wanted to protect his community from the potential for violence and from the band's "outward display of immorality".

In 1991, Johnson was defeated in his bid for a sixth term, losing to Robert Nunes 6922 votes to 6741.

=== City Manager of Lowell ===
Shortly after his defeat, Johnson was chosen by the Lowell City Council to serve as City Manager. He was sworn in on December 16, 1991 and served concurrently as mayor of Taunton until his term ended on January 5, 1992.

In 1992, Lowell lost control of its budget to the state finance commission due to its unstable financial condition. It regained control in 1995. That same year, the City Council approved bond sales for the Tsongas Center and Edward A. LeLacheur Park.

=== Post-government career ===
After leaving government, Johnson served as vice president of Veolia Water North America. As of 2019, he resides in Sandwich, Massachusetts.

== See also ==
- Timeline of Lowell, Massachusetts, 1990s
