= John F. Cox =

American politician

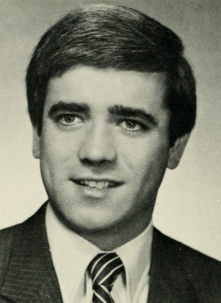

City Manager of Lowell, Massachusetts
- In office 2000–2006
- Preceded by: Brian J. Martin
- Succeeded by: Bernard F. Lynch

Member of the Massachusetts House of Representatives from the 17th Middlesex District
- In office 1983–1995
- Preceded by: Nikolas Lambros
- Succeeded by: Thomas Golden, Jr.

Personal details
- Born: July 27, 1955 (age 71) Lowell, Massachusetts
- Party: Democratic
- Education: Salem State College; New England School of Law
- Occupation: Attorney; Politician; City Manager

John F. Cox is an American attorney, politician, and city manager who served as a member of the Massachusetts House of Representatives and as City Manager of Lowell, Massachusetts.

== Early life ==
Cox was born on July 27, 1955, in Lowell to John E. and Arlene M. Cox. His father was an insurance salesman who served He graduated from Lowell High School in 1973 and went on to earn a bachelor's degree in political science from Salem State College in 1977 and a J.D. degree from the New England School of Law in 1980. Cox served as an assistant Middlesex district attorney for one year before opening his own law practice in Lowell.

== State representative ==
In 1982, Cox was elected to the Massachusetts House of Representatives, defeating incumbent Nikolas Lambros in the Democratic primary. He would go on to serve a total of six terms.

In 1994, Cox was fined $1,750 by the State Ethics Commission for accepting free meals and other gratuities from lobbyists in violation of state conflict-of-interest rules.

== City manager ==
In 2000, Cox was named City Manager of Lowell. He had some success as city manager, but his style clashed with that of the city council. In April 2006, city councilors met with Cox to inform him that the majority of the council wanted him to step down. Later that month he announced his resignation.

== See also ==
- Timeline of Lowell, Massachusetts, 2000s
