= Thomas Golden Jr. =

American politician

Thomas A. Golden Jr.
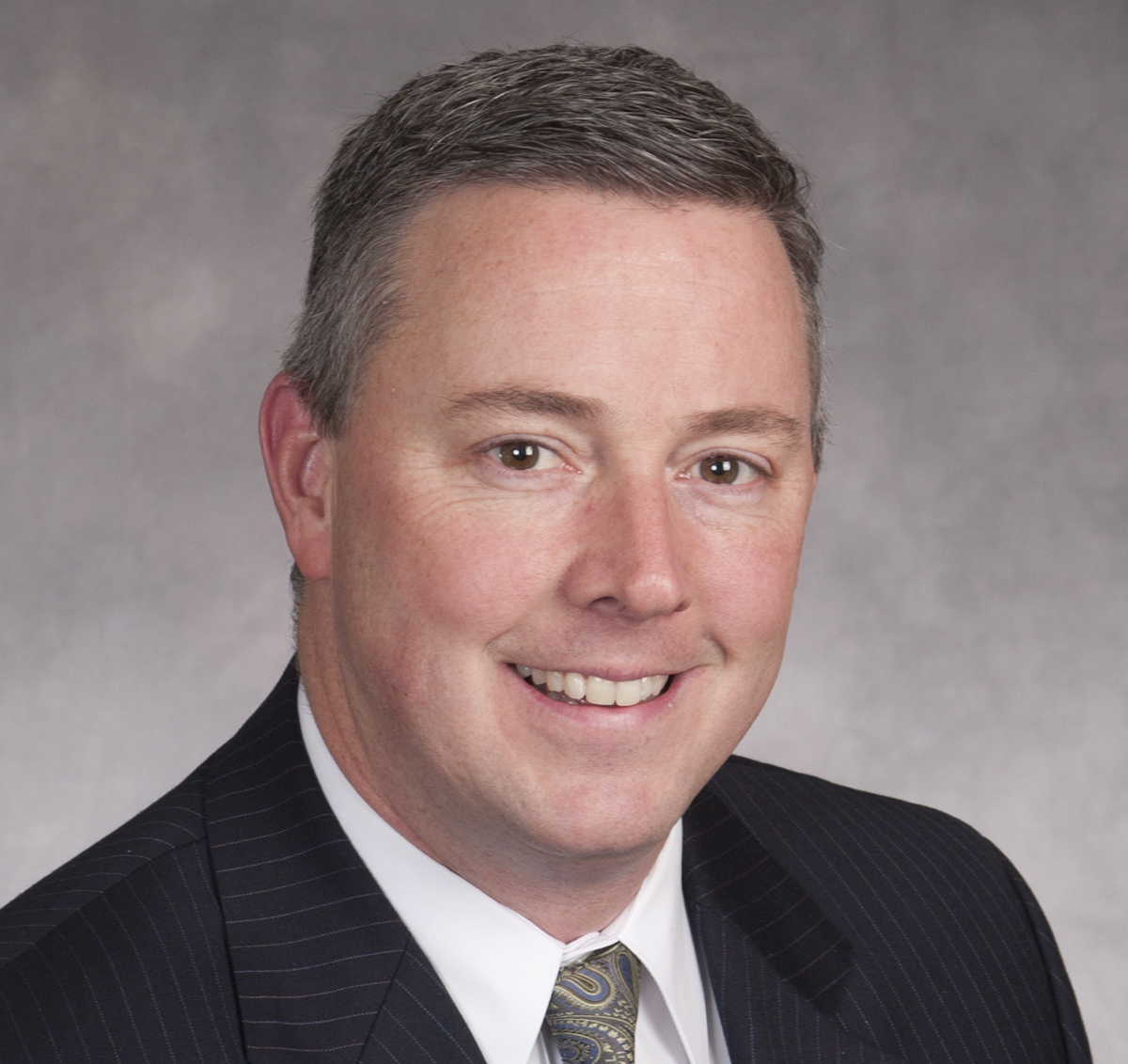

City Manager of Lowell, Massachusetts
- Incumbent
- Assumed office April 11, 2022
- Preceded by: Eileen Donoghue

Member of the Massachusetts House of Representatives from the 16th Middlesex district
- In office 1995–2022
- Preceded by: John F. Cox
- Succeeded by: Rodney Elliott

Personal details
- Born: March 5, 1971 (age 55) Lowell, Massachusetts
- Party: Democratic
- Education: University of Massachusetts Lowell
- Occupation: Politician; Realtor

Thomas A. Golden, Jr. (born March 5, 1971) is an American politician who is the city manager of Lowell, Massachusetts. He previously represented the 16th Middlesex District in the Massachusetts House of Representatives, where he was the Co-Chair of the Joint Committee on Telecommunications, Utilities and Energy.

== See also ==
- 2019–2020 Massachusetts legislature
- 2021–2022 Massachusetts legislature

Massachusetts House of Representatives
Preceded by John F. Cox	Member of the Massachusetts House of Representatives from the 17th Middlesex district 1995–2003	Succeeded by David Nangle
Preceded by John F. Cox	Member of the Massachusetts House of Representatives from the 16th Middlesex district 2003–2022	Succeeded by Rodney Elliott
