= Shaunna O'Connell =

American politician (born 1970)

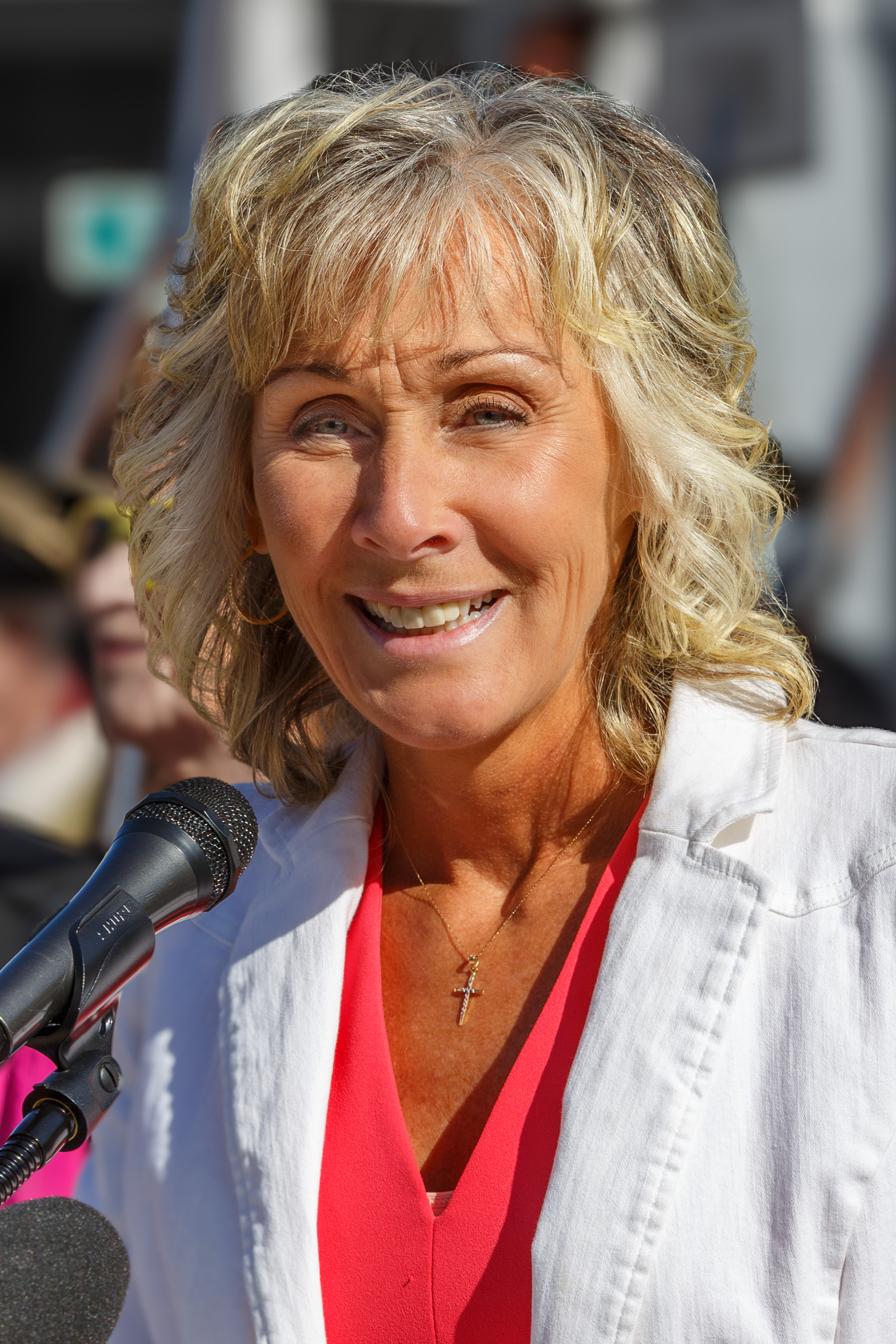

51st Mayor of Taunton
- Incumbent
- Assumed office January 6, 2020
- Preceded by: Donald Cleary

Member of the; Massachusetts House of Representatives; from the 3rd Bristol district
- In office January 2011 – January 6, 2020
- Preceded by: James H. Fagan
- Succeeded by: Carol Doherty

Personal details
- Born: March 14, 1970 (age 56) Taunton, Massachusetts, U.S.
- Party: Republican
- Spouse: Ted O'Connell
- Children: 2
- Education: Massasoit Community College; Massachusetts Bay Community College
- Occupation: Freelance Court Reporter

Shaunna O'Connell is an American politician and court reporter from Taunton, Massachusetts. A Republican, she currently serves as the 51st Mayor of Taunton, having served in office since January 2020. O’Connell was previously a member of the Massachusetts House of Representatives, serving in that office from 2011 until 2020 and representing the Third Bristol District.

== Early life and education ==
O'Connell grew up in Taunton to divorced parents who ended up on housing assistance to meet family expenses. She worked her way through college by working two jobs. She worked in the food service department of the Morton Hospital and Medical Center, working her way up to a supervisory position.

O'Connell attended the Massachusetts Bay Community College (Wellesley, Massachusetts) and Massasoit Community College (Brockton, Massachusetts).

== Political career ==
O'Connell launched her first state representative campaign against incumbent Democratic state representative James Fagan in June 2009, citing comments Fagan made in 2008 during a debate on a child sexual assault bill as her inspiration to run. She defeated Fagan in the 2010 general election by 44 votes on election day, prompting a recount. She held on in the recount, with her margin of victory narrowing by only 13 votes and winning by 31 votes.

O'Connell won re-election in 2012, 2014, 2016, and 2018, facing a Democratic opponent in each election. In 2019, O'Connell ran for Mayor of Taunton and won, becoming the 50th mayor and first female mayor in Taunton's history. She won re-election in 2022 and 2025. The 2025 race was highly contested by Democrat Estelle Borges, who came to within a point of defeating her and was leading for most of the night. In fact, a media outlet called the race for Borges, before late votes swung it back into O’Connells’ favor, She faced controversy at the start of her mayoral campaign, with CommonWealth Magazine reporting that Massachusetts Lieutenant Governor Karyn Polito had given O'Connell notice that incumbent Taunton Mayor Thomas Hoye would not run for re-election.

== Personal life ==
O'Connell and her husband, Ted, have two daughters. In June 2023, their younger daughter went missing from an addiction and mental health treatment center in Hilliard, Ohio. She was found in Columbus four days later.

On July 22, 2024, O'Connell was arraigned on charges of assault and battery on a household member and assault and battery with a dangerous weapon after she allegedly bit and struck her husband with a crowbar during an argument at their home on July 19. Her attorney entered a plea of not guilty on her behalf and she was released on personal recognizance.

== Electoral history ==
Taunton Mayoral General Election 2023
Party	Candidate	Votes	%	±%
Republican	Shaunna O'Connell	5,276	58.7	−3.7
Democratic	Edward A.Correira	3,673	40.1	
Total votes		9,152	98	
Republican hold				

Taunton Mayoral General Election 2021
Party	Candidate	Votes	%	±%
Republican	Shaunna O'Connell	4,369	62.4	+0.4
Write-In	Write-Ins	257	3.7	
	Blanks	2,376	33.9	
Total votes		7,002	100	
Republican hold				

Taunton Mayoral General Election 2019
Party	Candidate	Votes	%	±%
Republican	Shaunna O'Connell	6,696	62	
Democratic	Estele C.Borges	3,888	36	
Total votes		10,800	98	
Republican gain from Democratic				

Massachusetts State Representative 3rd Bristol District, 2018
Party	Candidate	Votes	%	±%
Republican	Shaunna O'Connell	8,334	61.5	+2.9
Democratic	Estele C.Borges	5,215	38.5	−2.8
Total votes		14,219	100	
Republican hold				

Massachusetts State Representative 3rd Bristol District, 2016
Party	Candidate	Votes	%	±%
Republican	Shaunna O'Connell	10,520	58.6	−2.7
Democratic	Estele C.Borges	7,417	41.3	+2.7
Total votes		18,942	99.9	
Republican hold				

Massachusetts State Representative 3rd Bristol District, 2014
Party	Candidate	Votes	%	±%
Republican	Shaunna O'Connell	6,824	61.3	+4.9
Democratic	Keavin P.Duffy, Jr	4,300	38.6	−4.9
Total votes		11,637	99.9	
Republican hold				

Massachusetts State Representative 3rd Bristol District, 2012
Party	Candidate	Votes	%	±%
Republican	Shaunna O'Connell	9,434	56.4	+6.3
Democratic	Sherry Costa-Hanlon	7,274	43.5	−6.4
Total votes		18,069	99.9	
Republican hold				

Massachusetts State Representative 3rd Bristol District, 2010
Party	Candidate	Votes	%	±%
Democratic	James H.Fagan	5,694	49.9	−49
Republican	Shaunna O'Connell	5,725	50.1	+50.1
Total votes		11,917	100.0	
Republican gain from Democratic				
