= Merrill Aldrich =

American politician

Mayor of Taunton, Massachusetts
- In office 1941–1946
- Preceded by: John E. Fitzgerald
- Succeeded by: John F. Parker

Personal details
- Born: February 11, 1899 Taunton, Massachusetts
- Died: January 14, 1957 (aged 57) Boston
- Party: Republican
- Spouse: Irene A. Hewitt (1920–1934; divorce)
- Domestic partner: Eileen Kelliher (1934–1946)

Merrill Drake Aldrich (1899 – 1957) was an American politician who served as mayor of Taunton, Massachusetts from 1941 to 1946.

== Early life ==
Aldrich was born in 1899 in Taunton. He served in the United States Army during World War I. Prior to entering politics, he worked in a furniture store. He also worked for many years as a funeral director.

== Political career ==
In 1930, Aldrich was appointed chief of police by the Taunton's new mayor, Wllis K. Hodgman. He was not retained by Hodgman's successor and in 1932 he ran for the Republican nomination for Sheriff of Bristol County. He finished fourth in the five candidate primary with 15% of the vote. The Republican nominee, Patrick H. Dupuis, defeated Democratic incumbent Edmond P. Talbot in the general election and appointed Aldrich as a deputy sheriff.

In 1941, Aldrich ran in the special election held following the death of Taunton mayor John E. Fitzgerald. He finished second in the eleven candidate nonpartisan primary behind acting mayor Harold B. Johnston. Aldrich defeated Johnston 5,968 votes to 5,795 to finish Fitzgerald's term. He was elected to a full term in December 1947 - defeating Bernard Cleary 79% votes to 21%. Two years later he defeated city councilor Robert Heap to win a second term.

In February 1944, Aldrich was indicted on charges of conspiracy to violate the Corrupt Practices act. He was alleged to have "corruptly promised to use his official authority" to reappoint Israel Louison to the office of License Commissioner during his reelection campaign. District Attorney Frank A. Smith's only piece of evidence was an undated letter signed by Aldrich stating that he would reappoint Louison. Judge John V. Sullivan instructed the jury that this was to enough to convict. On January 15, 1945, Aldrich, Louison, and a third defendant - county commissioner Leo Coughlin, were found not guilty. That December, Aldrich was reelected in a close race with city council president William Duffy. During the campaign, Aldrich donated a $10,000 ambulance to the city.

In 1946, Aldrich was an unsuccessful candidate for both the Democratic and Republican nominations in a June special election for the Massachusetts Senate seat in the First Bristol District.

On May 30, 1946, Aldrich fell ill with a heart condition after marching in a Memorial Day parade. On doctor's advice he went to his summer home in Falmouth, Massachusetts to rest. In July 1946, doctors told him that he had less than six months to live.

== Personal life ==
On June 15, 1920, Aldrich married Irene A. Hewitt. On June 2, 1934 she filed for divorce on the grounds of "neglect to provide". The divorce was granted on June 22 and she was awarded $7 a week in alimony.

Following the divorce, Aldrich was seen with Eileen Kelliher, a bookkeeper ten years his junior. It was believed that the two had married on a trip they took to Florida following Aldrich's divorce. On June 21, 1946, Kelliher filed a paternity suit against Aldrich, alleging that he had fathered her 2-year-old daughter out of wedlock. Records failed to show a marriage license, but showed a birth certificate issued May 10, 1944 listing Merrill D. Aldrich and Elieen L. Kelliher and the parents of Mary L. Kelliher.

On July 8, 1946, Aldrich was arrested for "lewd and lascivious cohabitation". Aldrich admitted to living with Kelliher for several years. He also admitted being the father and offered to set up a trust fund for the child. After several postponements due to Aldrich's ill health, Aldrich and Kelliher were convicted of cohabitation and each sentenced to a year in jail. Aldrich appealed and was released on bail. He pled guilty on November 25, 1946 and his sentence was reduced to three months. He resigned as mayor after entering the guilty plea.

== Later life ==
While in jail, Aldrich ran in the special election to finish his term. He finished fifth in the ten candidate primary. Aldrich also ran in the 1947 and 1951 elections, but lost both times to his successor, John F. Parker.

Aldrich spent his later years residing in Falmouth, where he worked in the real estate business.

== Death ==
On January 13, 1957, Aldrich, who was scheduled to undergo a serious abdominal operation, saw 2000 A.D. a television program on WBZ-TV about the Boston Eye Bank. When the program ended, he called the bank and donated his eyes to them. He died the following day. His eyes were donated to a 21-year-old mother of three from Saint John, New Brunswick, who had lost almost all of the vision in her left eye, and a 42-year-old Maine grandmother who had been totally blind for the past ten years.
