= Richard Everett Warner =

American politician (1861–1931)

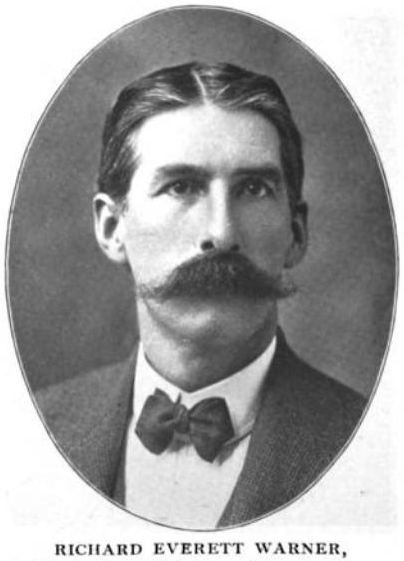

Mayor of Taunton, Massachusetts
- In office 1902–1905
- Preceded by: John O'Hearn
- Succeeded by: John H. Eldredge

Personal details
- Born: October 6, 1861; New Bedford, Massachusetts
- Died: October 1, 1931 (aged 69); Taunton, Massachusetts
- Spouse: Ida Evelyn Briggs
- Children: Joseph Everett Warner
- Profession: Treasurer of the White-Warner Company

Richard Everett Warner (October 6, 1861 – October 1, 1931) was an American businessman and politician who served as the Mayor of Taunton, Massachusetts.

On December 3, 1901, Warner defeated John O'Hearn, the incumbent Democratic mayor. Warner received 3,002 voted against 2,023 for O'Hearn.

On December 6, 1904, Mayor Warner lost the election to independent Republican candidate John H. Eldredge by 65 votes.

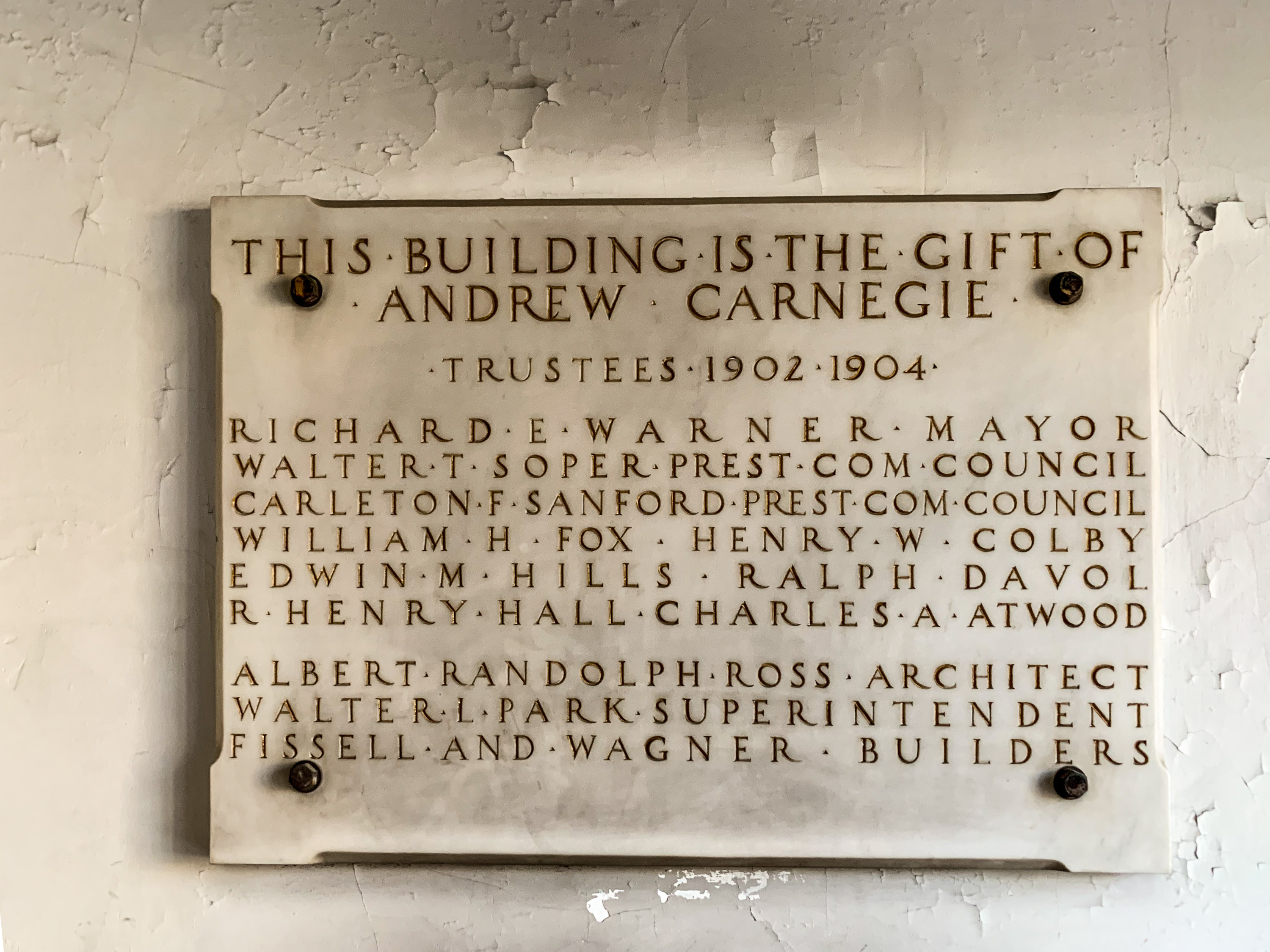
As this plaque indicates, the Taunton Public Library was dedicated during Warner's term

Political offices
Preceded by John O'Hearn	Mayor of Taunton, Massachusetts; 1902 – 1905	Succeeded by John H. Eldredge
