= M. Brendan Fleming =

American politician

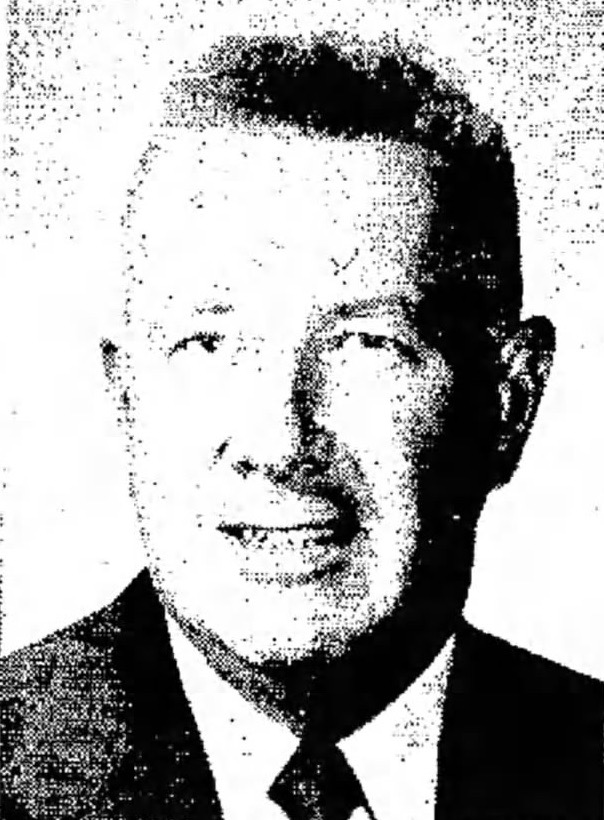
- Fleming photographed in 1973.

75th Mayor of Lowell, Massachusetts
- In office 1982–1984
- Preceded by: Robert C. Maguire
- Succeeded by: Brian J. Martin

Member of the Lowell, Massachusetts City Council
- In office 1969–1992

Personal details
- Born: February 2, 1926 Lowell, Massachusetts
- Died: May 28, 2016 (aged 90)

Military service
- Allegiance: United States
- Branch/service: US Navy
- Battles/wars: World War II

Martin Brendan Fleming (February 2, 1926 – May 28, 2016) was the mayor of Lowell, Massachusetts, from 1982 to 1984, and a member of the Lowell City Council for nine terms between the years of 1969 and 1992. Fleming was a faculty member in the mathematics department at Lowell Technological Institute and the University of Lowell for decades, retiring in 1996.

== Life and career ==
In 1963, Fleming served on the Board of the Lowell Redevelopment Authority, chaired by Homer Bourgeois, President of the Lowell Union National Bank. During this time, the Lowell Redevelopment Authority initiated a Federal Urban Renewal project which would demolish Lowell's Little Canada neighborhood, Merrimack Manufacturing Company, and the Dutton Street Boardinghouses. Against Chairman Bourgeois' wishes, Fleming, along with several other LTI faculty members and community activist Lydia Howard, worked tirelessly to save and preserve the red brick Dutton Street Boardinghouses built in 1845. They failed, and shortly thereafter Chairman Bourgeois replaced Fleming on the Board of the Lowell Housing Authority.

Committed to the historic preservation of Lowell canal system and historic mill buildings, in 1966 Fleming went before the Lowell City Council and suggested the creation of the Lowell Historic Commission and was rejected, told that the history of Lowell best be forgotten. Fleming then ran for the Lowell City Council in 1967 and finished in 11th place of 18 candidates — missing a seat on the Lowell City Council by two spots, but won his first council election in 1969 with a first-place finish receiving 16,639 votes; finishing with 56.7 percent of the vote and 1331 votes more than second-place finisher Ellen Sampson.

In 1971, Fleming proposed the creation of the Lowell Historic District Commission and the establishment of the "Lowell Locks and Canals Historic District" and the "City Hall Historic District." Fleming efforts were the foundation of the Historic Preservation and Restoration that has taken place in Lowell, Massachusetts.

At the start of Fleming's short run as mayor, Lowell had been in serious decline during the textile recession as factories closed down. From 1950 to 1980 the city of Lowell declined in population by 20,000 as many families fled the city to find new work. By the mid-'70s, the city was witnessing a deep depression, with more than 100 acres of industrial land vacant and unemployment close to 15 percent. During his time as mayor and tenure in city council, he watched over 100 new electronics and computer companies relocate headquarters to Lowell. The city quickly rebounded in that decade cutting unemployment rate in half while tripling the tax revenue at the same time.

During the Boston desegregation busing crisis where various cities in Massachusetts began adopting forced bussing as a means to desegregate public schools, Fleming criticized Senator Ted Kennedy for a proposal to bring celebrities into the city of Lowell to ride buses by calling the idea an “attack team” and said “many residents were offended” because Lowell had been a city that historically had open arms toward immigrants. In response Senator Kennedy replied “This is the worst problem of all, to have Lowell labeled a bigoted city”, after several Lowell School Committee candidates campaigned on an antibusing platform. Governor Michael Dukakis then directed Education Commissioner Harold Raynolds and Massachusetts Attorney General James Shannon to threaten lawsuit against the Lowell School Committee charging school officials and city council members with violating equal rights guarantee of the 14th amendment.

When the Lowell city council voted to create a park in honor of Jack Kerouac, Fleming voted against naming the park after Kerouac. "I didn’t think, and I still don’t think, that this particular person would be the best example for our children," Fleming said. "And there were other people who we could have voted for, like (Air Force commander) Hoyt Vandenberg – he came from Lowell – or Bette Davis. Kerouac is not someone about whom I want to say, 'This is the type of person who comes from Lowell.'" Using his voting power he also played a large role in forcing the removal of and keeping away adult-themed stores and cinemas in the city, saying "If you put garbage in, you'll get garbage out."
