= San Francisco Tetlanohcan Municipality =

Coordinates: 19.2667°N 98.1667°W

- Municipality
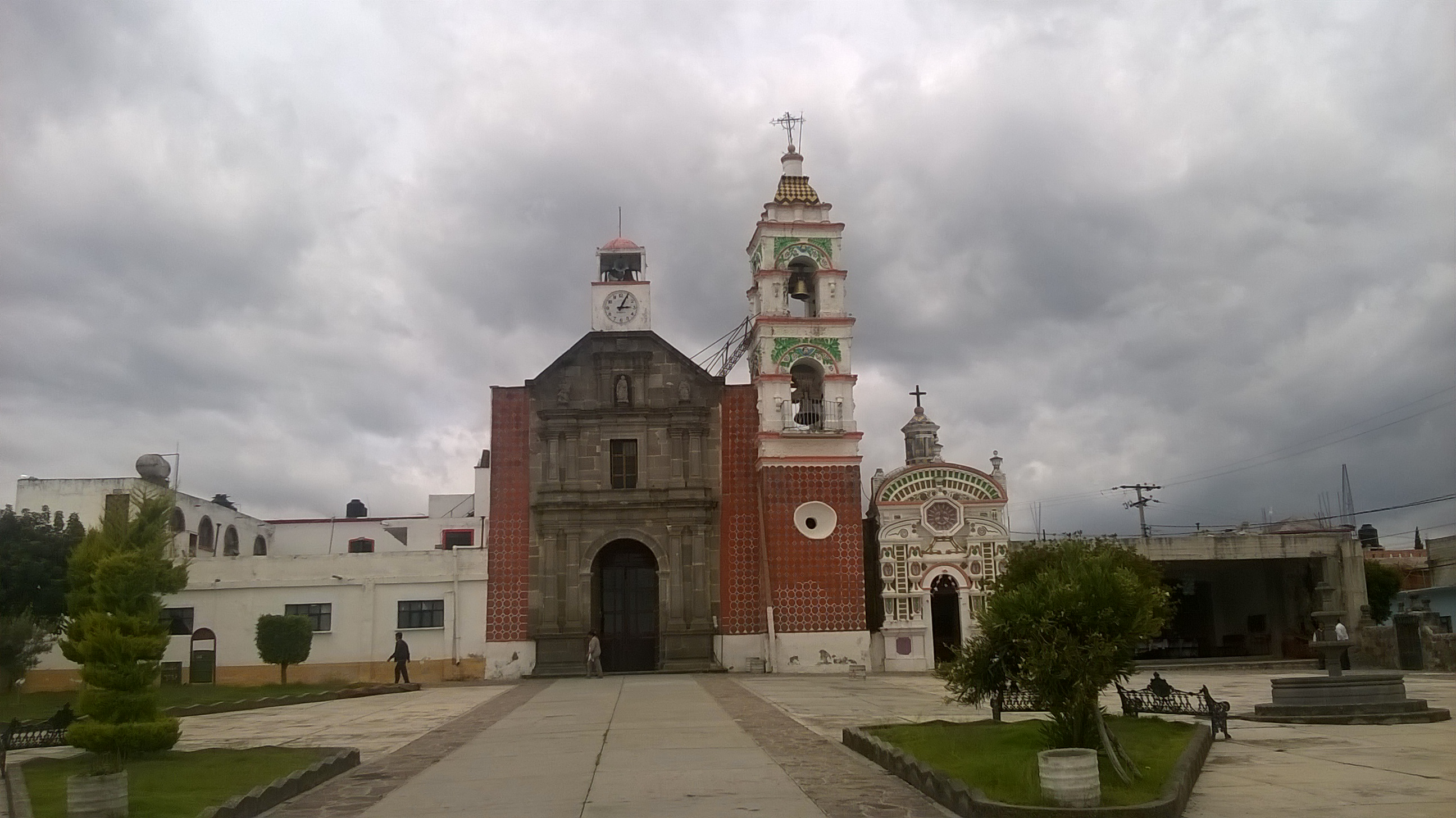
- Interactive map of San Francisco Tetlanohcan Municipality
- Country: Mexico
- State: Tlaxcala
- Time zone: UTC-6 (Central Standard Time)
  - Summer (DST): UTC-5 (Central Daylight Time)

San Francisco Tetlanohcan is a municipality in Tlaxcala in south-eastern Mexico.
