= Theodore J. Aleixo Jr. =

American lawyer and politician (born 1942)

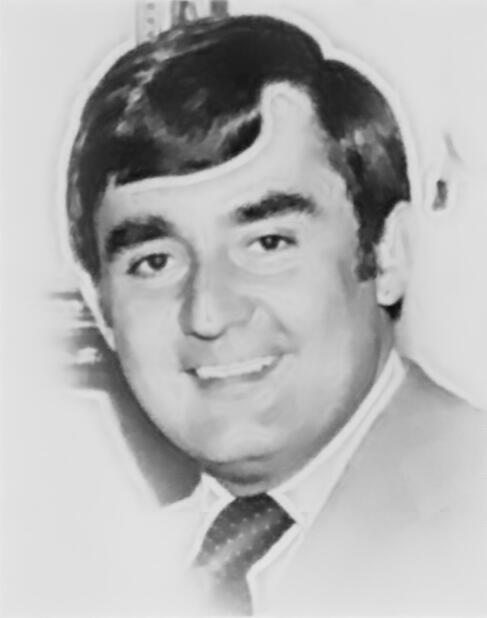
- Aleixo c. 1990

Mayor of Taunton, Massachusetts
- In office 1974–1976
- Preceded by: Rudolph H. DeSilva
- Succeeded by: Benjamin A. Friedman

Member of the Massachusetts Senate from the Bristol and Plymouth district
- In office 1989–1991
- Succeeded by: Erving H. Wall Jr.

Member of the Massachusetts House of Representatives from the 3rd Bristol district
- In office 1969–1989
- Succeeded by: Marc R. Pacheco

Personal details
- Born: August 23, 1942 (age 83) Taunton, Massachusetts
- Party: Democratic
- Education: Boston University (A.B.); Suffolk University (J.D.)

Theodore J. Aleixo Jr. (born August 23, 1942) is an American lawyer and politician from Massachusetts. He served in both houses of the Massachusetts General Court and as the Mayor of Taunton, Massachusetts.

Aleixo was elected to the Massachusetts House of Representatives in 1968 and served for 20 years. During his time in the House, he simultaneously served as Mayor of Taunton from 1974 to 1976. In 1988, he was elected to one term in the Massachusetts Senate.

Aleixo Tiger Stadium at Taunton High School and the Aleixo Skating Arena in Taunton are named in his honor.

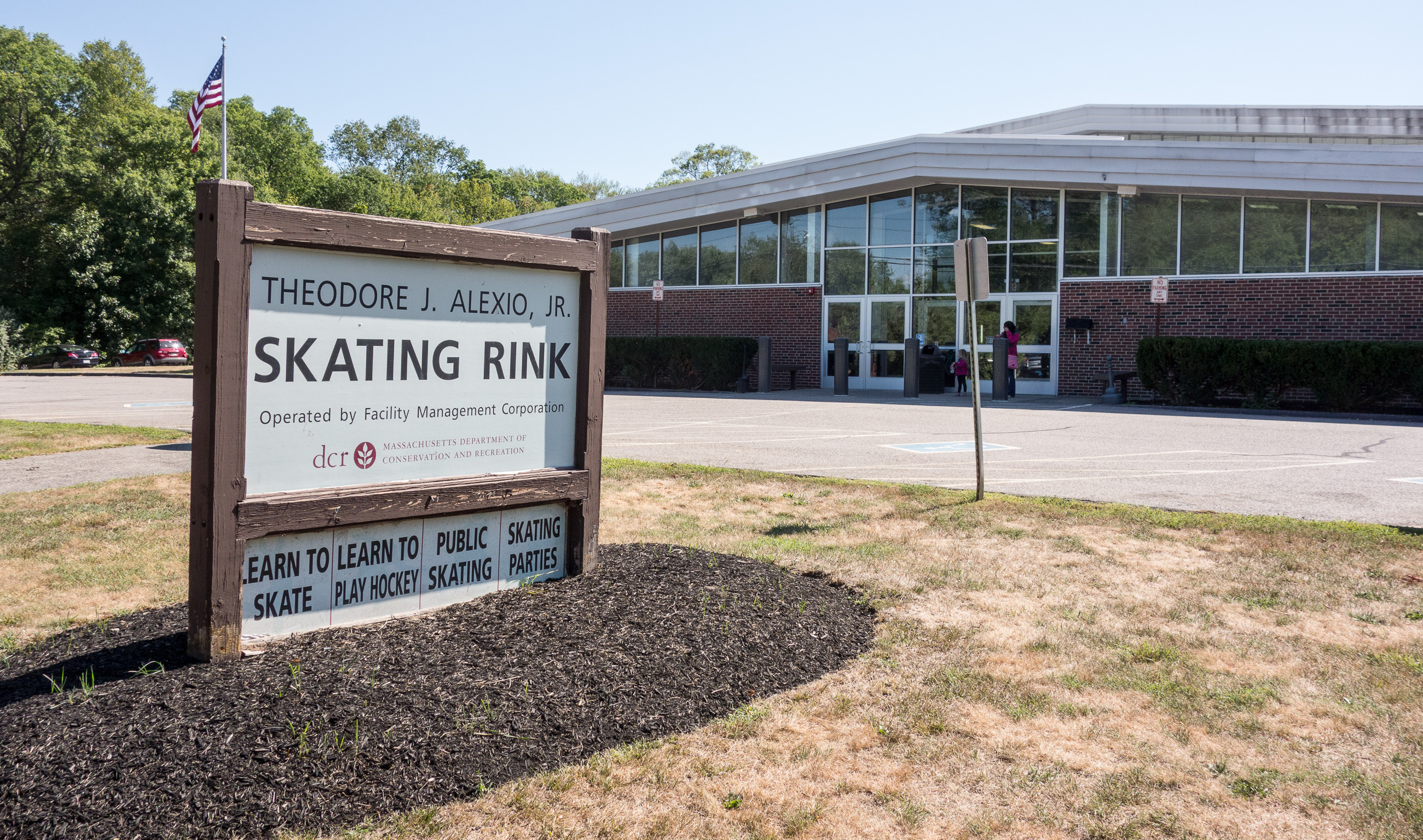
Alexio Skating Rink in Taunton, Massachusetts.

== See also ==
- 1977–1978 Massachusetts legislature
- 1987–1988 Massachusetts legislature
- Massachusetts House of Representatives' 14th Bristol district

== Notes ==
Political offices
Preceded by Rudolph H. DeSilva	Mayor of Taunton, Massachusetts; 1974-1976	Succeeded by Benjamin A. Friedman
