= Thomas J. Kenny (politician) =

American politician

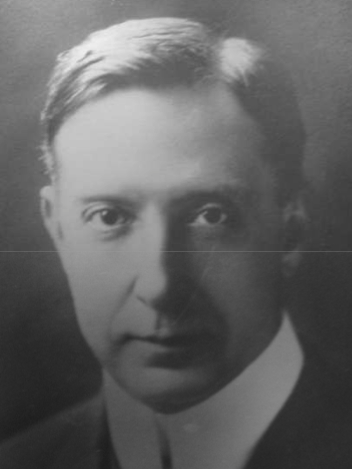
- Kenny circa 1910

President of the Boston City Council
- In office 1913–1913
- Preceded by: John J. Attridge
- Succeeded by: Daniel J. McDonald

Member of the Boston City Council
- In office 1910–1915
- Preceded by: council created
- Succeeded by: Henry E. Hagan

Member of the Boston School Committee
- In office 1905–1907
- Preceded by: board reconstituted
- Constituency: at-large
- In office 1898–1904
- Succeeded by: board reconstituted as a body elected at-large
- Constituency: 14th ward

Personal details
- Born: November 18, 1863 South Boston
- Died: May 17, 1926 (aged 63) South Boston
- Party: Democratic

Thomas Joseph Kenny (November 18, 1863 – May 17, 1926) was an American politician who served as a member of the Boston City Council and the Boston School Committee. He was runner up in the 1914 Boston mayoral election.

== Early life ==
Kenny was born on November 18, 1863. He was raised in South Boston and attended Boston Public Schools. He began working at the law firm of Morse, Loomis, & Lane at the age of 16 and was admitted to the bar in 1897. That same year he entered a partnership with George W. Morse. In 1903 the firm was reorganized as Morse, Hickey, & Kenny. Following Morse’s death in 1905, Kenny became the senior partner of the firm following. In addition to practicing law, Kenny also served as president of the Atlas Chemical Company and Newton Building Company, was an officer of the George G. Carter Company, Henry L. Sawyer Company, Hub Wire Cloth and Wire Work Company, and the Wakefield Paper Box Company, and was a director of the Ketchikan Consolidated Mines Company.

== Politics ==
From 1898 to 1904 he represented Ward 15 on the school committee. In 1905 he was elected to the reorganized at-large committee. He declined renomination in 1907 after the Democratic Party failed to renominate his ally on the board, William S. Kenny (no relation).

In 1909, Kenny was elected to the Boston City Council. He was reelected in 1911. In 1913 he was elected council president. Kenny served as acting mayor during John F. Fitzgerald’s vacation to Palm Beach, Florida in February 1913.

On October 29, 1913, Kenny entered the 1914 Boston mayoral election. His campaign was managed by fellow councilor Walter Ballantyne, a Republican. Kenny ran on a platform supporting a reduced tax rate, street improvements, centralizing all city purchasing under the supply department, public advertisement of contracts, and establishing a merit system for hiring and promotions in all departments. Following Mayor John F. Fitzgerald’s unexpected withdrawal from the race, the Kenny campaign sought to capture a majority of the Fitzgerald vote, however the mayor stayed neutral in the race between Kenny and the only remaining candidate, James Michael Curley. Kenny received the endorsement of the Citizens' Municipal League, the majority of Democratic ward chairs, as well as many Republican leaders. Curley defeated Kenny by a margin of about 6,000 votes. Kenny’s defeat was blamed on poor turnout from the largely Republican Goo-goos (members of the Good Government Association).

== Later life ==
Kenny remained on the city council until his term ended on January 30, 1915. He endorsed James A. Gallivan in the 1917 Boston mayoral election over the GGA-backed Andrew James Peters.

Kenny died on May 17, 1926. Never married, Kenny was survived by a brother and a sister. He left the bulk of his estate to Boston College.
