= Matthews Arena =

Multi-purpose arena in Boston, Massachusetts

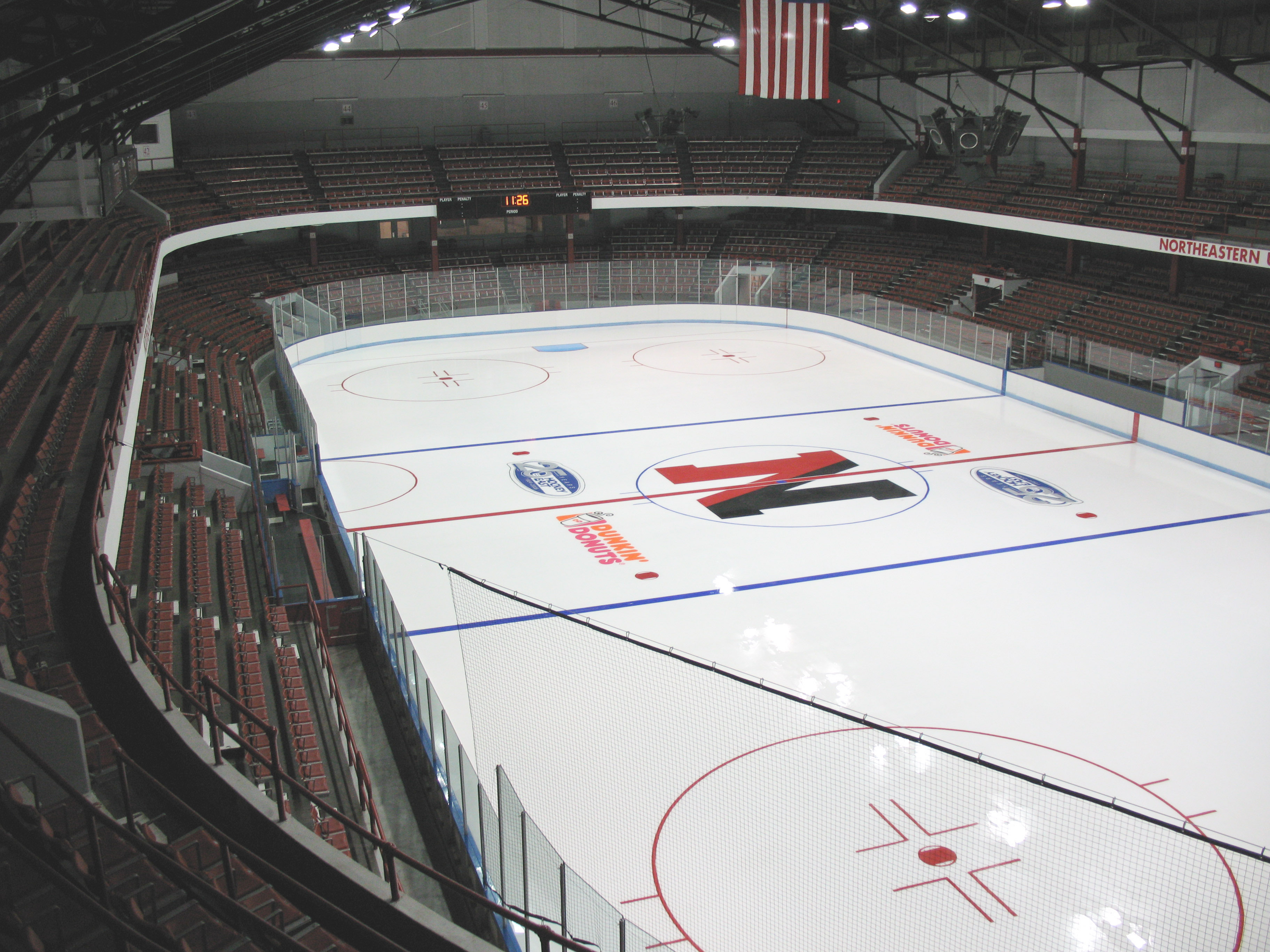
- Interior of arena in 2009
- Interactive map of Matthews Arena
- Former names: Boston Arena (1909–1982)
- Location: 238 St. Botolph Street, Boston, Massachusetts
- Coordinates: 42°20′28″N 71°5′4″W
- Owner: Northeastern University
- Operator: Northeastern University
- Capacity: Ice hockey: 4,666; Basketball: 5,066
- Surface: 200 ft × 90 ft (61 m × 27 m) (hockey)
- Designation: National Register and Boston Landmark eliglible
- Public transit: Orange Line at Massachusetts Avenue; Green Line at Symphony

Construction
- Groundbreaking: October 11, 1909
- Opened: April 25, 1910
- Closed: December 13, 2025
- Demolished: February 25, 2026 (started)

Tenants
- Northeastern Huskies (Hockey East, CAA) (1930–1943, 1946–2025); WIT Leopards (ECAC) (1992–2025); Harvard Crimson men's ice hockey (independent/IHL/TL/QL/PL) (1911–1917, 1921–1943, 1945–1956); Boston College Eagles men's ice hockey (independent) (1917–1929, 1932–1943, 1945–1958); Boston University Terriers men's ice hockey (independent/ECAC) (1918–1943, 1945–1971); Boston Bruins (NHL) (1924–1928); Boston Tigers/Cubs (CAHL) (1926–1936); Boston Olympics (EAHL/QSHL) (1940–1952); Boston Celtics (BAA/NBA) (1946–1955); New England Whalers (WHA) (1972–1973)

Matthews Arena (formerly Boston Arena) was a multi-purpose arena in Boston, Massachusetts, owned by Northeastern University. At the time of its closure, it was the world's oldest multi-purpose athletic building still in use, as well as the oldest arena in use for ice hockey. The university demolished the historic arena due to irreparable structural issues and is replacing it with a new facility.

It was the original home of the National Hockey League (NHL)'s Boston Bruins (the last team of the NHL's Original Six whose original home arena still existed), the National Basketball Association (NBA)'s Boston Celtics, and the World Hockey Association (WHA)'s New England Whalers (now the NHL's Carolina Hurricanes)

It was used by the Northeastern Huskies men's and women's ice hockey teams, and the men's basketball team, as well as various high school ice hockey programs in the city of Boston. The venue also hosted Northeastern's graduation ceremonies, its annual Springfest concert, and other events.

== History ==
=== Early years ===
Originally named the Boston Arena, groundbreaking took place on October 11, 1909. The 1896 United States skating champion Herbert S. Evans dug the first portion of earth. The arena was to have a capacity of 5,000 and was to be used for ice skating, curling, horse shows, and a variety of sporting events. The arena had its own power plant, which powered the two 100-ton ice machines and all of the arena's lighting. Charles C. Abbey was the first president and treasurer of the Boston Arena Company and William T. Richardson was the building's first general manager.

The arena was scheduled to open on Christmas Day 1909, but construction delays pushed back the opening until April 25, 1910. The arena's inaugural event was an ice carnival to benefit the Sharon Sanatorium. Skating events were held throughout the day, including a performance by Irving Brokaw. The arena's first ice hockey game was won by the Harvard Freshmen hockey team, who defeated Newton High School, 4–0. The Harvard varsity squad played later that evening, losing to Crescent H. C., 1–0. The Arena's original ice surface was larger than the current standard at 220-by-90-foot (67 m × 27 m).

The first games of professional ice hockey at the Arena took place in March 1911 when a two-game $2,500 competition between two NHA teams, the Montreal Wanderers and the Ottawa Senators took place. The Arena was the home ice for a number of amateur and college hockey teams, including the Boston Athletic Association, Boston Arenas, Westminster Hockey Club, Boston College, Boston University, Harvard, and MIT.

The rink was also home to the Boston Girls' Hockey Club, one of the first women's hockey teams in the United States (1916–1918).

=== Fire and reconstruction ===
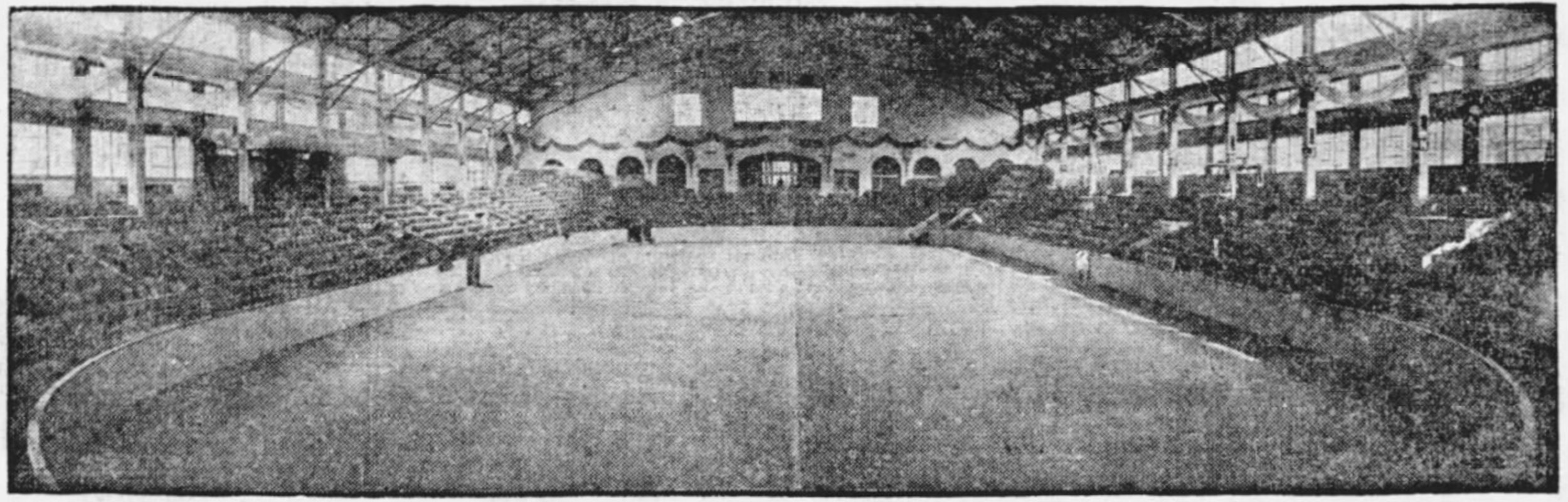
Interior of Boston Arena in December 1920

The Arena was destroyed by fire on December 18, 1918. It was rebuilt, and the new facility opened January 1, 1921, with an ice show.

From 1921 to 1932, the Boston Athletic Association Indoor Games were held at the arena.

The NHL's first US-based franchise, the Boston Bruins, made the Boston Arena their home from 1924 to 1928. Before the team began play, the Arena reduced its ice surface from 220 x 90 feet down to 200 x 80 feet to conform to NHL regulations. This also allowed the Arena to add 1,000 seats.

=== Competition from the Boston Garden ===
In 1927, Homer Loring, chairman of the Boston & Maine Railroad, announced the construction of a new sports arena at their North Station facility. The Madison Square Garden Corporation signed a 25-year lease for the arena. The Boston Garden opened in 1928 and replaced the Arena as the city's venue for premier boxing, wrestling, and track events. The Bruins broke their contract with the Arena to move to the Garden, which led to a legal battle between the two sides that ended in 1933, when Bruins owner Charles F. Adams agreed to pay the arena $54,000. Boston Arena general manager George V. Brown was able to keep the venue running with college hockey and figure skating.

The Garden ran their shows at a loss in order to keep events away from the Arena. In 1934, the smaller Boston Arena Corporation, led by Henry G. Lapham, purchased a controlling interest in the Boston Garden. In 1936, the Boston Garden-Arena Corporation bought out the remaining stock owned by the Madison Square Garden Corporation.

=== Metropolitan District Commission ownership ===
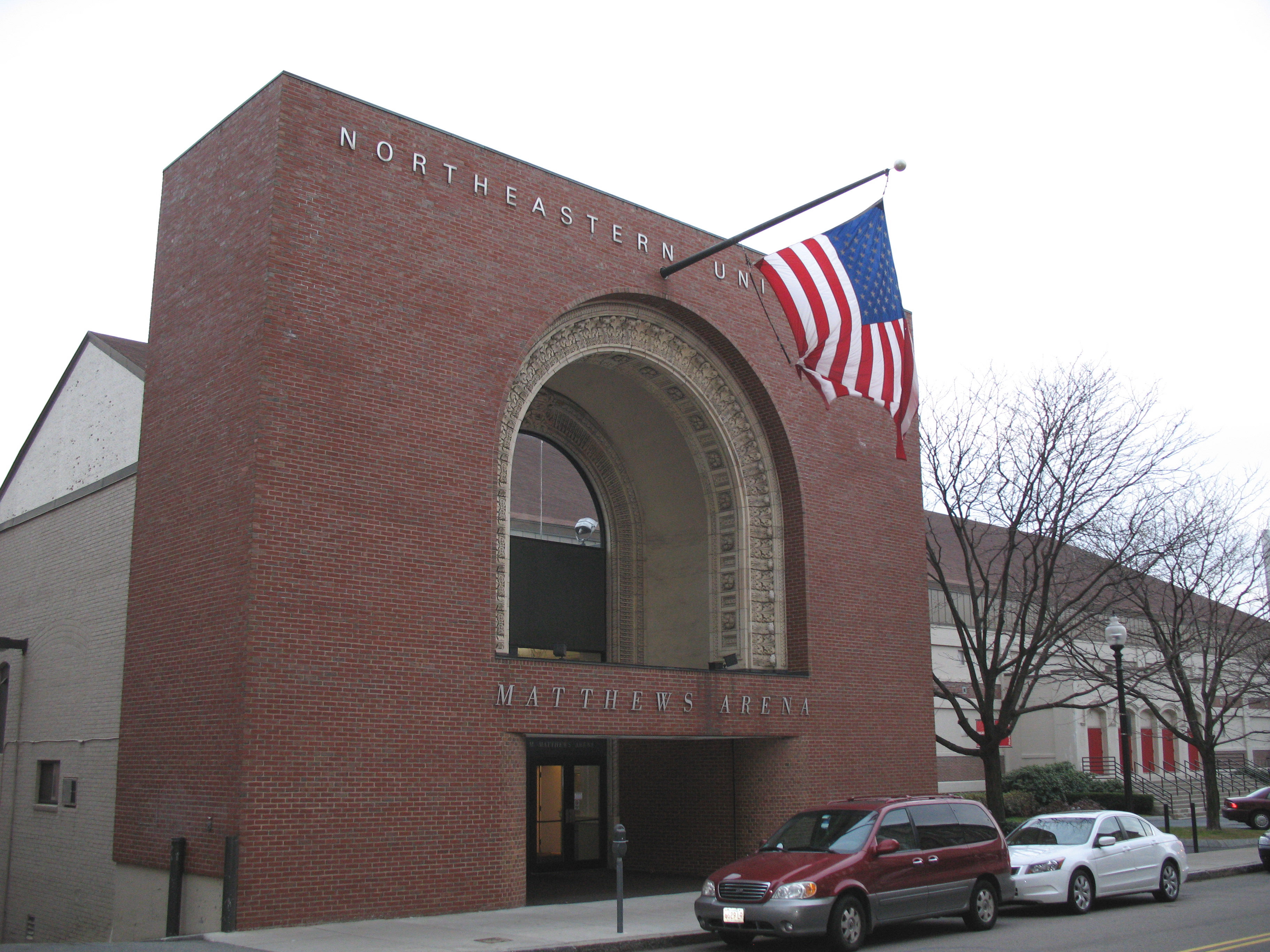
Entrance to the arena, showing the original arch from Boston Arena now enclosed by bricks

On April 16, 1953, the Boston Garden-Arena Corporation sold the Boston Arena to Samuel L. Pinsly for $240,000. He planned on doubling the size of the building and converting it into a garment manufacturing facility, as the purchase agreement included a five-year ban on sports or events at building unless it was acquired by a government entity. Three months later, the building was purchased by the Metropolitan District Commission for $280,000, which planned on using it for high school sports and other athletic events. Francis Ouimet was named chairman of the MDC's Boston Arena Authority and Clark Hodder was named manager of the Arena.

In 1975, the MDC offered to sell the Arena to the city of Boston for $450,000. The city leased the building from the MDC pending completion of the purchase. The sale never took place and in 1977, the MDC leased the Arena at no cost to Northeastern University.

=== Northeastern University's Matthews Arena ===
The Arena was purchased by Northeastern University on October 3, 1979. The arena was known as Northeastern Arena until November 14, 1982, when it was renamed Matthews Arena in honor of the university's chairman emeritus George Matthews.

A 1995 renovation expanded the ice surface from 200 by 80 to 200 by 90 feet (61 m × 24 m to 61 m × 27 m).

=== Demolition ===
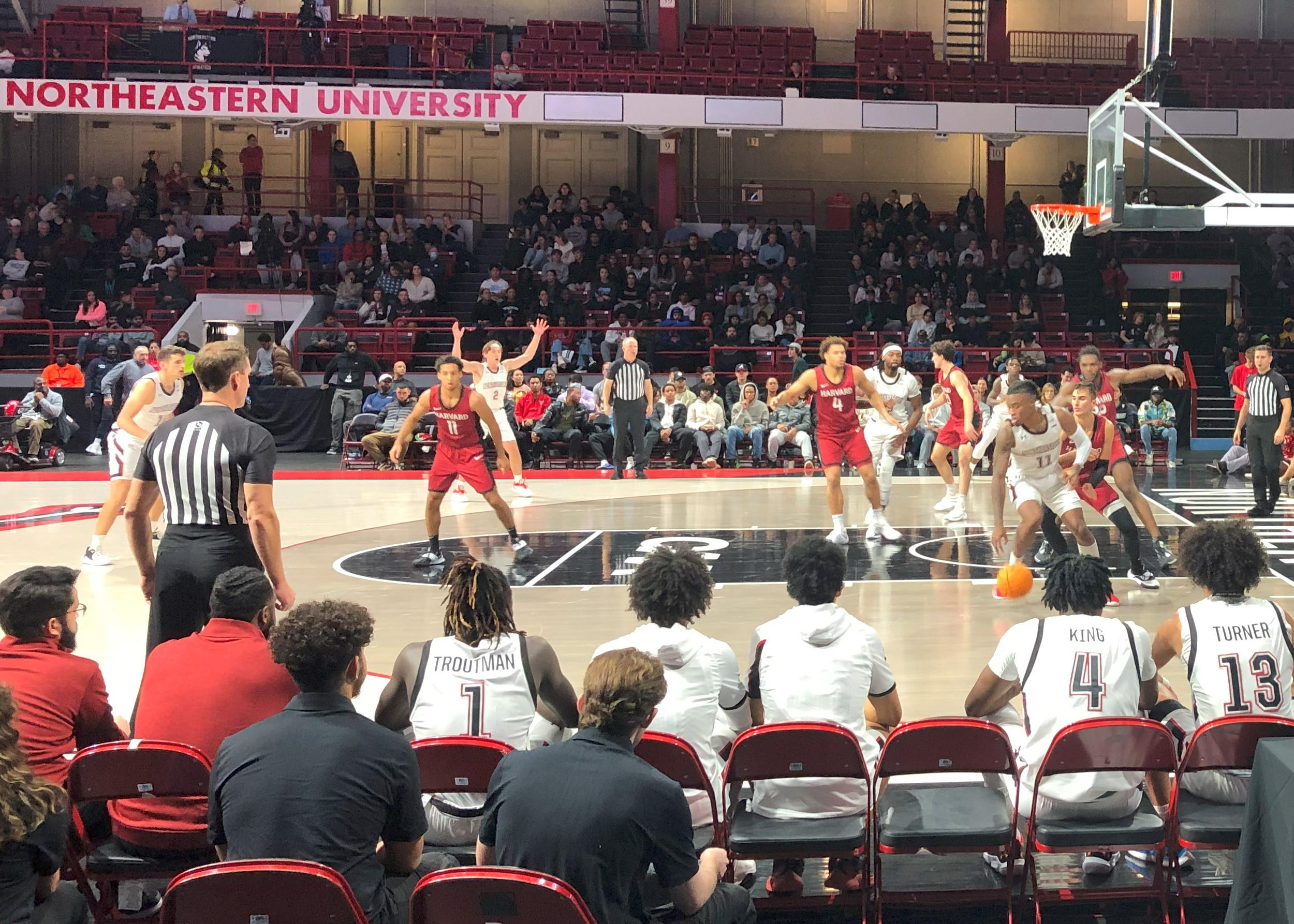
Mathews Arena converted for basketball for a Northeastern Huskies men's basketball game

In May 2024, Northeastern University filed a letter of intent to the Boston Planning & Development Agency to construct a new multi-purpose athletics facility designed that would demolish and replace Matthews Arena.

This came as concerns surrounding the structural integrity of Matthews Arena increased: scaffolding was erected to support the east end of the arena in 2024, part of the student section as well as the Varsity Club (home to the arena's only licensed bar) were closed, and the foundation, built on reclaimed land once part of a wharf, was found to be sinking.

The final hockey game played in the Arena was held on December 13, 2025, between Boston University and Northeastern. Boston University won 4–3. The arena's demolition, scheduled to begin in February 2026 and be complete by the end of April, began on February 25 despite a massive blizzard having just swept through the region. The building was disassembled to minimize disruption to the densely developed area; much of the material were recycled, and many arena artifacts were preserved. The arena's historic arch, which dates to 1901, will be used in the new arena, and the university sold 1,000 bricks salvaged from the arena.

While the new arena is being constructed, Northeastern's basketball programs are playing home games at the on-campus Cabot Center. The hockey programs play at a variety of sites due to many sizable rinks in greater Boston being already occupied by other Division I programs. To close out the 2025-26 campaign, the men's and women's teams played designated home games at Walter Brown Arena on the Boston University campus and Bentley Arena at Bentley University in Waltham. The men's team also played a "home" series versus Maine at Tsongas Center in Lowell (home to UMass Lowell) and Cross Insurance Arena in Portland, Maine. The women's team used Walter Brown Arena as its home site for the Hockey East tournament and the men's team will play its postseason home games at Boston College's Conte Forum.

== Notable events ==
=== Political rallies ===
On October 10, 1910, former president Theodore Roosevelt delivered a speech before a crowd of 8,000 spectators. In it, he endorsed Governor Eben Sumner Draper and U.S. Senator Henry Cabot Lodge for reelection. Draper, who was present for the speech, spoke after Roosevelt.

During the 1912 United States presidential campaign, the arena hosted a rally for President William Howard Taft and two rallies for the Bull Moose Party ticket, one headlined by presidential nominee Theodore Roosevelt and the other headlined by vice presidential nominee Hiram Johnson. Herbert Hoover and Al Smith both delivered speeches here during the 1928 campaign. The Democratic Party hosted two large rallies at the arena during the 1932 presidential campaign, one headlined by Smith and the other headlined by presidential nominee Franklin D. Roosevelt. Republican nominee Thomas E. Dewey spoke at the arena during his 1948 presidential campaign.

Malcolm Nichols held a rally at the arena during his 1937 mayoral campaign.

=== Hockey ===
The Bruins played their first-ever NHL regular season game at the Arena on Monday, December 1, 1924, with the Bruins' most historic rivalry with the Montreal Canadiens being initiated only one week later. The Bruins left for the Boston Garden in 1928, but returned for one game in 1952 after a wooden awning in North Station collapsed and damaged some pipes in the Garden. The Detroit Red Wings beat the Bruins 4–3 in front of only 4,049 fans.

In 1952, the Arena served as the first home to the annual Beanpot tournament between Boston's four major college hockey programs. From 1953 to 1970, it hosted the Boston Arena Christmas Tournament. The 1960 NCAA men's ice hockey tournament was held at the Boston Arena.

From 1972 to 1974, the venue was home to the New England Whalers of the World Hockey Association.

=== Basketball ===
In 1925, professional basketball made its debut at the Arena when the Boston Whirlwinds of the American Basketball League played their inaugural home game on November 30, 1925. Unable to meet its financial obligations, the team moved its games first to the Mechanics Hall and then to the Mount Benedict Knights of Columbus Hall in Somerville, Massachusetts. The Arena was also home to the American Basketball League's Boston Trojans during their only season.

On November 5, 1946, the Boston Celtics played their first ever game in front of 4,329 fans at the Boston Arena. At the time the Celtics made their home debut in the newly-created Basketball Association of America (now known as the National Basketball Association), the Boston Arena's new basketball court for their inaugural season had cost $11,000 at the time, though due to the post-World War II housing boom of the time, seasoned hardwood would be in short supply, meaning the soon-to-be-famous parquet flooring built by Tony DiNatalie from Brookline would not only be made entirely out of scrap wood, but also showcase 264 interlocking square panels not all matching properly in terms of design. Not only that, but their first home game there would be delayed by the first ever recorded broken backboard set by Chuck Conners. The team split its home games between the Garden and the Arena until 1955. They played their last home game at the Arena against the Philadelphia Warriors on February 20, 1955.

=== Concerts ===
On May 4, 1958, the Boston Arena hosted a rock 'n' roll concert headlined by Alan Freed and Jerry Lee Lewis. After the show, one man was stabbed and a dozen others were robbed, which led to Mayor John Hynes declaring that he would not authorize anymore licenses for rock concerts and arena manager Paul Brown stating that "the next rock 'n' roll show at the Arena will be presented over my dead body". Freed was charged with inciting a riot, but the case was dropped due to the death of the chief investigator and difficulty of bringing in witnesses from outside Massachusetts.

The Doors were booked to perform two shows at the Boston Arena on April 10, 1970. The second concert did not begin until after midnight and went on for two hours before arena management turned off the power. Lead singer Jim Morrison, who appeared to be intoxicated during the entire latter show, wanted to continue and smashed a microphone stand into the floor before being escorted off the stage. The shows were released as a live album, Live in Boston, in 2007.

Phish's New Year's Eve concert on December 31, 1992, was the band's highest attended concert to date and was broadcast live (and rebroadcast the following day) on WBCN.

Under Northeastern ownership, the arena continued to host two concerts per year put on by the school's student-run Council for University Programs (CUP).

=== Other events ===
The arena hosted receptions for Jess Willard (1915), Clarence Ransom Edwards (1918), Harry Boland (1921), Charles Lindbergh (1927), the crew of the Bremen (1928), and Amelia Earhart (1928).

For many years, the arena hosted Boston University's graduation ceremonies. Commencement speakers included Hamilton Holt, Harry Emerson Fosdick, Garfield Bromley Oxnam, Basil Joseph Mathews, Karl Taylor Compton, Roscoe Pound, George F. Zook, John Erskine, Alessandro Ghigi, Alf Landon, and Paul V. McNutt.

Boston hosted the American Legion's 1940 national convention. The formal session was held at the Boston Arena and featured speeches from Director of the Federal Bureau of Investigation J. Edgar Hoover, Governor Leverett Saltonstall, and Mayor Maurice J. Tobin.

In 1946, the arena hosted the national encampment of the Veterans of Foreign Wars. Future U.S. President John F. Kennedy was the general chairman of the convention. Speakers included fleet admiral Chester W. Nimitz, Governor Maurice J. Tobin, and Congressmen Joseph W. Martin Jr. and John W. McCormack.

Paul Bowser, Price and Dellamano Promotions, and Tony Santos promoted wrestling cards at the arena.

Boxing was once a mainstay at the arena and hosted bouts with Jack Sharkey and Marvelous Marvin Hagler.

In 1993, the arena hosted the funeral service for Boston Celtics captain and Northeastern alum Reggie Lewis.

== See also ==
- Huntington Avenue Grounds, site of the nearby first home of the Boston Red Sox baseball team (playing there 1901–1911), existed on current Northeastern University property
- List of NCAA Division I basketball arenas

Preceded by none	Home of Boston University Terriers men's ice hockey 1917–1971	Succeeded by Walter Brown Arena
Preceded by none	Home of the Boston Bruins; 1924–1928	Succeeded by Boston Garden
Preceded by none	Home of the Boston Celtics; 1946–1955	Succeeded by Boston Garden
Preceded by none	Home of the New England Whalers; 1972–1973	Succeeded by Eastern States Coliseum
