= 1914 Boston mayoral election =

Election in Massachusetts, United States

- January 13, 1914
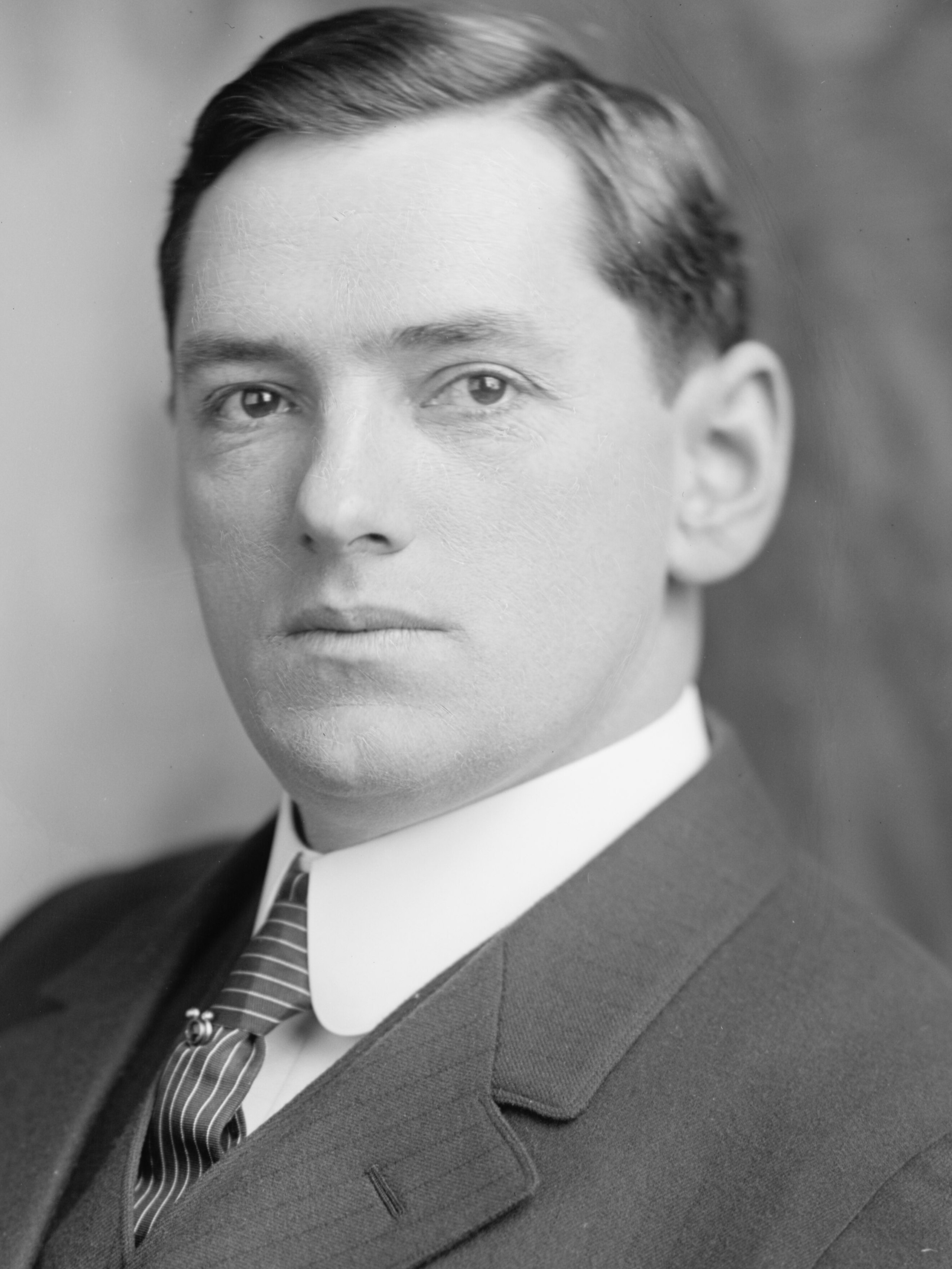

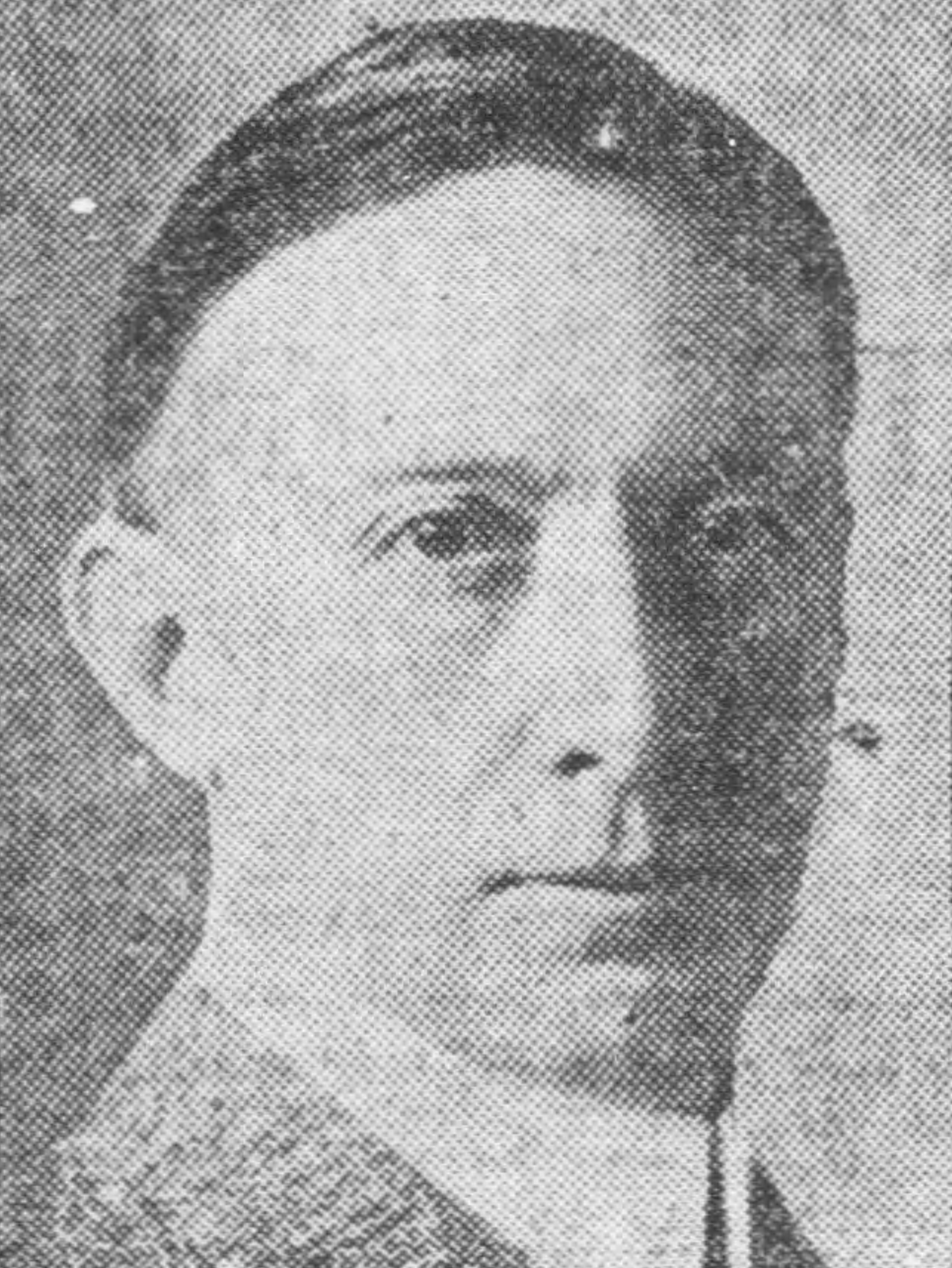
Candidate	James Michael Curley	Thomas J. Kenny
Party	Nonpartisan	Nonpartisan
Popular vote	43,262	37,522
Percentage	53.5%	46.4%
Mayor before election
John F. Fitzgerald
Elected mayor
James Michael Curley

The Boston mayoral election of 1914 occurred on Tuesday, January 13, 1914. James Michael Curley, member of the United States House of Representatives, was elected Mayor of Boston for the first time, defeating Thomas J. Kenny, president of the Boston City Council.

Incumbent mayor John F. Fitzgerald withdrew in December, citing illness; in actuality, Curley and attorney Daniel H. Coakley forced Fitzgerald from the race after learning of his indiscretions with a cigarette girl, Elizabeth "Toodles" Ryan.

Curley was inaugurated as mayor on Monday, February 2, and intended to continue also serving in Congress. However, on February 25, after political pressure mounted to unseat him, Curley announced his resignation from Congress, retroactive to February 4.

This was the last January-scheduled general election for Mayor of Boston; the next mayoral election was held in December 1917.

== Candidates ==
- James Michael Curley, member of the U.S. House of Representatives since 1913
- Thomas J. Kenny, president of the Boston City Council, member of the Council since 1910

Withdrew

- John F. Fitzgerald, Mayor of Boston since 1910, prior Mayor of Boston (1906–1908), former member of the U.S. House of Representatives (1895–1901) and the Massachusetts Senate (1892–1894)
- John A. Keliher, former member of the U.S. House of Representatives (1903–1911) and the Massachusetts Senate (1899–1900)
- John R. Murphy, former member of the Massachusetts Senate (1886 – 1886) and the Massachusetts House of Representatives (1883–1885)
- Andrew James Peters, member of the U.S. House of Representatives since 1907

Other

- Michael J. Fitzgerald, Barber; The Boston Globe on 13 Nov 1913, Thu • Page 5 reported the practical joke played on Michael J. Fitzgerald in entering his name for candidacy actually was gaining support with thousands of signatures, labor organizations offering assistance and prominent politicians willing to put "a strong machine" behind him. 10 days later, 23 Nov 1913, Sun • Page 2 The Boston Globe published Michael Fitzgerald expressing his gratitude for the many who signed for his nomination but declined running for office. The post ended with " Citizens, you may select John F. but not Michael J. Fitzgerald to kick to a frazzle the many variegated velours that are tossed in the ring of the coming municipal contest."
- Ernest E. Smith, member of the Boston City Council since 1911; insufficient signatures for nomination

== Results ==
Candidates	General Election	
Candidates	Votes	%
James Michael Curley	43,262	53.5%
Thomas J. Kenny	37,522	46.4%
all others	39	0.0%

== See also ==
- List of mayors of Boston, Massachusetts
