= 1941 Boston mayoral election =

Election in Massachusetts, United States

- November 4, 1941

Candidate	Maurice J. Tobin	James Michael Curley	Joseph Lee
Party	Nonpartisan	Nonpartisan	Nonpartisan
Popular vote	125,786	116,430	19,186
Percentage	45.98%	43.49%	7.17%
Mayor before election
Maurice J. Tobin
Elected mayor
Maurice J. Tobin

The Boston mayoral election of 1941 occurred on Tuesday, November 4, 1941. Incumbent Mayor Maurice J. Tobin defeated former Mayor James Michael Curley and two others.

This was the first election held following a 1939 referendum that repealed a 1918 law, which had prevented an incumbent Mayor of Boston from serving consecutive terms.

Inaugural exercises were held Monday, January 5, 1942.

== Candidates ==
- James Michael Curley, Governor of Massachusetts from 1935 to 1937, Mayor of Boston from 1914 to 1918, 1922 to 1926, 1930 to 1934. Member of the United States House of Representatives from 1913 to 1914.
- Joseph Lee, member of the Boston School Committee since 1937.
- Malcolm Nichols, Mayor of Boston from 1926 to 1930.
- Maurice J. Tobin, Mayor of Boston since 1938. Member of the Boston School Committee from 1931 to 1937.

== Results ==
Candidates	General Election	
Candidates	Votes	%
Maurice J. Tobin (incumbent)	125,786	45.98
James Michael Curley	116,430	43.49
Joseph Lee	19,186	7.17
Malcolm Nichols	6,318	2.36

== See also ==
- List of mayors of Boston, Massachusetts
