= Peter Francis Tague =

American politician (1871–1941)

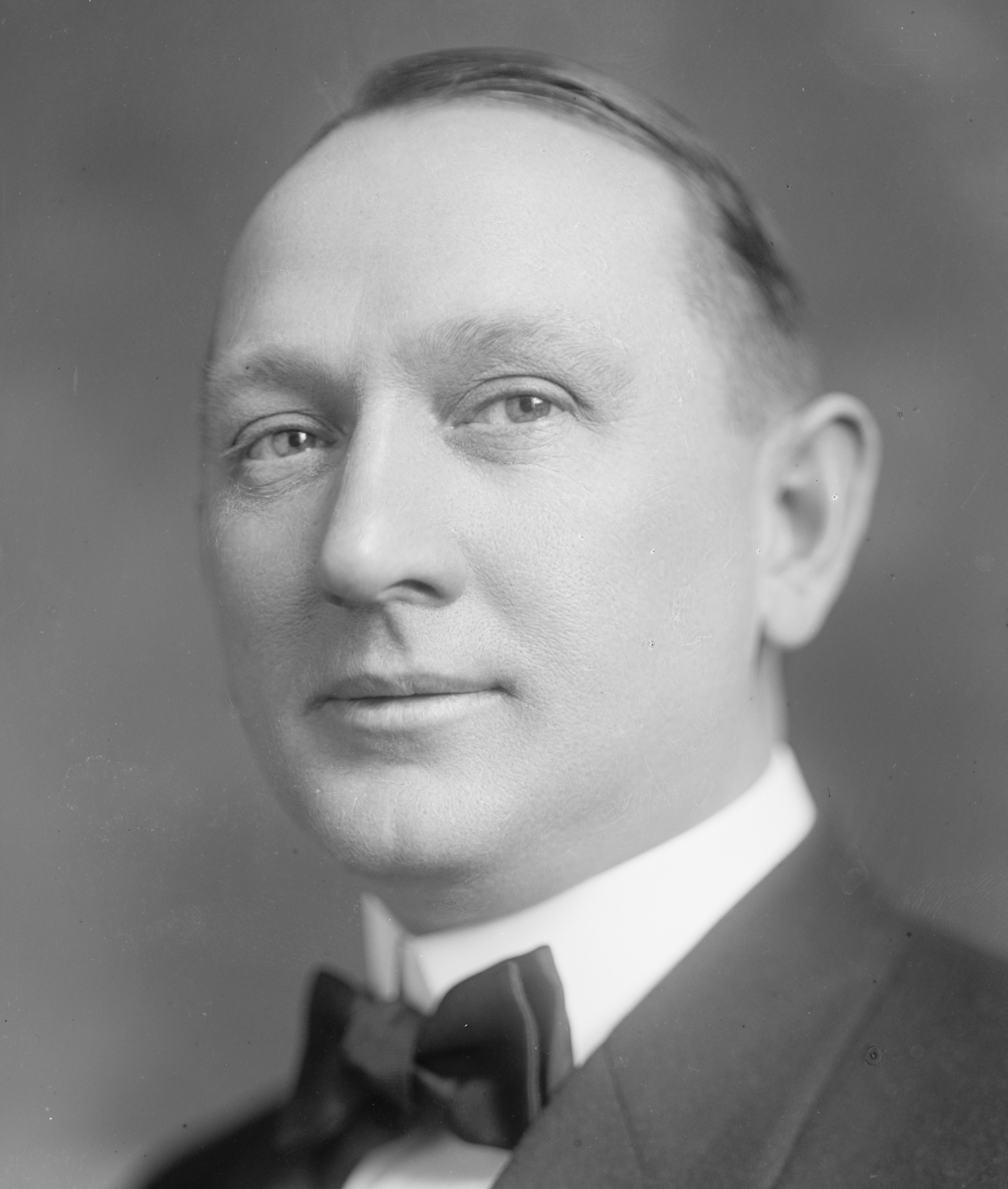
- Tague, 1905–1941

Member of the U.S. House of Representatives from Massachusetts's 10th district
- In office March 4, 1915 – March 3, 1919
- Preceded by: William Francis Murray
- Succeeded by: John F. Fitzgerald
- In office October 23, 1919 – March 3, 1925
- Preceded by: John F. Fitzgerald
- Succeeded by: John J. Douglass

Member of the Massachusetts Senate from the Second Suffolk District
- In office 1899–1900
- Preceded by: David B. Shaw
- Succeeded by: David B. Shaw

Member of the Massachusetts House of Representatives
- In office 1897–1898
- In office 1913–1914

Member of the Boston Common Council
- In office 1894–1896

Personal details
- Born: June 4, 1871 Charlestown, Boston, U.S.
- Died: September 17, 1941 (aged 70) Boston, Massachusetts, U.S.
- Resting place: Holy Cross Cemetery, Malden, Massachusetts.
- Party: Democratic
- Spouse: Josephine T. Fitzgerald
- Education: English High School
- Occupation: Manufacturing chemist

Peter Francis Tague (June 4, 1871 – September 17, 1941) was a member of the United States House of Representatives from Boston, Massachusetts.

== Early years ==
Tague was a son of Peter and Mary (Shaw) Tague, immigrants from Ireland. His father was a cooper.

Tague attended Frothingham Grammar school and English High School in Boston. He then entered business, supplying blacksmiths and building contractors.

Tague married Josephine T. Fitzgerald on January 31, 1900; they had two sons.

== Business career ==
Tague was a bookkeeper and Northeast representative of Never Slip Manufacturing Company. He later became a manufacturing chemist and a supplier of chemicals to business.

== Political career ==
Tague became a member of the Boston Common Council in 1894, at the age of just 23. He served for two years, and then was elected a member of the Massachusetts House of Representatives, serving in 1897-1898. The following year he was elected a State senator, serving for two years. He gave up politics for a time to concentrate on his business. He ran again in 1913, winning election to the Massachusetts House of Representatives.

=== U.S. Congress ===
Tague next entered national politics, serving as a Democrat in the Sixty-fourth and Sixty-fifth Congresses (March 4, 1915 – March 3, 1919).

==== 1918 election ====
In 1918, Tague was faced with a major challenge from former Boston mayor John F. Fitzgerald. Tague lost the primary to Fitzgerald by 50 votes. He contested his loss in the primary and appealed to the election commissioners, but he lost that appeal and Fitzgerald was declared the nominee of the Democratic Party. Tague contested the general election as a sticker and write-in candidate and initially he narrowly lost the general election to Fitzgerald, by 238 votes.

Tague contested the election result. After the House of Representatives election committee canvassed over 1,300 votes Fitzgerald's plurality went down to 10 votes. After determining that one-third of the votes in three precincts of Boston's Ward 5 were fraudulent, the committee threw out the votes of those precincts. The committee determined that the election had been tainted by illegal registrations and fraud. They determined that Tague won the election by 525 votes. On October 2, 1919, by a vote of 5 to 2, the committee voted to unseat Fitzgerald and to seat Tague.

On October 23, 1919, the full House of Representatives unseated Fitzgerald and seated Tague.

Tague was reelected to the Sixty-seventh and Sixty-eighth Congresses, serving from October 23, 1919, to March 3, 1925. Tague is noted for having introduced a bill in Congress in 1921 to investigate the KKK, which then was becoming a powerful force nationwide. He was defeated for reelection in 1924.

=== Boston mayoral candidate ===
Tague was an unsuccessful candidate for Mayor of Boston in December 1917, finishing fourth in a field of four candidates; the election was won by Andrew James Peters.

== Later years ==
Following his defeat for Congress in 1924, Tague resumed his business career. He was appointed assessor of Boston in 1930 and chairman of the election commission of Boston the same year. In 1936, he was appointed postmaster and served until his death.

Tague died in Boston on September 17, 1941, at the age of 70. He was interred in Holy Cross Cemetery in Malden, Massachusetts.

U.S. House of Representatives
Preceded by William F. Murray	Member of the U.S. House of Representatives from Massachusetts's 10th congressional district March 4, 1915 – March 3, 1919	Succeeded by John F. Fitzgerald
Preceded by John F. Fitzgerald	Member of the U.S. House of Representatives from Massachusetts's 10th congressional district October 23, 1919 - March 3, 1925	Succeeded by John J. Douglass
