= 1929 Boston mayoral election =

Election in Massachusetts, United States

- November 5, 1929
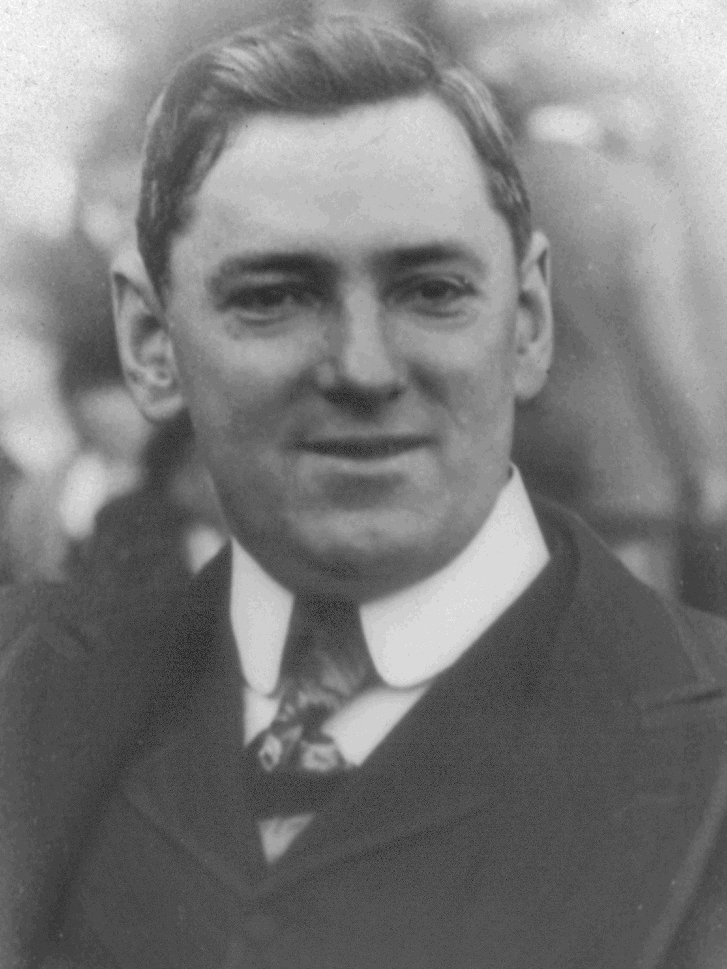

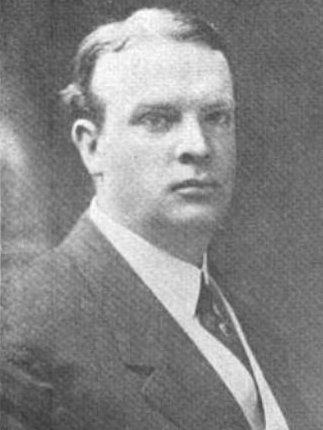
Candidate	James Michael Curley	Frederick Mansfield
Party	Nonpartisan	Nonpartisan
Popular vote	117,084	96,626
Percentage	54.1%	44.6%
Mayor before election
Malcolm Nichols
Elected mayor
James Michael Curley

The Boston mayoral election of 1929 occurred on Tuesday, November 5, 1929. Former Mayor of Boston James Michael Curley defeated two other candidates to be elected mayor for the third time.

In 1918, the Massachusetts state legislature had passed legislation making the Mayor of Boston ineligible to serve consecutive terms. Thus, incumbent Malcolm Nichols was unable to run for re-election.

Curley was sworn on Monday, January 6, 1930.

== Candidates ==
- Daniel H. Coakley, disbarred attorney, unsuccessful candidate for Mayor of Boston in November 1925.
- James Michael Curley, member of the United States House of Representatives from 1913 to 1914, Mayor of Boston from 1914 to 1918, 1922 to 1926.
- Frederick Mansfield, Treasurer and Receiver-General of Massachusetts from 1914 to 1915.

== Results ==
Candidates	General Election	
Candidates	Votes	%
James Michael Curley	117,084	54.1%
Frederick Mansfield	96,626	44.6%
Daniel H. Coakley	2,800	1.3%
all others	3	0.0%

== See also ==
- List of mayors of Boston, Massachusetts
