= 1937 Boston mayoral election =

Election in Massachusetts, United States

- November 2, 1937

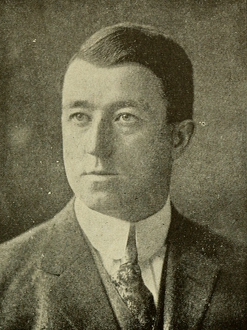
Candidate	Maurice J. Tobin	James Michael Curley
Party	Nonpartisan	Nonpartisan
Popular vote	105,212	80,376
Percentage	38.56%	29.46%
Candidate	Malcolm Nichols	William J. Foley
Party	Nonpartisan	Nonpartisan
Popular vote	55,247	28,184
Percentage	20.25%	10.33%
Mayor before election
Frederick Mansfield
Elected mayor
Maurice J. Tobin

The Boston mayoral election of 1937 occurred on Tuesday, November 2, 1937. Boston School Committee member Maurice J. Tobin defeated five other candidates, including former mayors James Michael Curley and Malcolm Nichols.

In 1918, the Massachusetts state legislature had passed legislation making the Mayor of Boston ineligible to serve consecutive terms. Thus, incumbent Frederick Mansfield was unable to run for re-election. The law would be changed in 1939, making this the last election where the incumbent mayor could not run for re-election.

Tobin was inaugurated on Monday, January 3, 1938.

== Candidates ==
- Carleton L. Brett, former Boston police officer
- James Michael Curley, governor of Massachusetts from 1935 to 1937, Mayor of Boston from 1914 to 1918, 1922 to 1926, 1930 to 1934, and member of the United States House of Representatives from 1913 to 1914
- William J. Foley, district attorney of Suffolk County since 1927
- Malcolm Nichols, mayor of Boston from 1926 to 1930
- Alfred Santosuosso, lawyer
- Maurice J. Tobin, member of the Boston School Committee since 1931

== Results ==
Candidates	General Election	
Candidates	Votes	%
Maurice J. Tobin	105,212	38.56
James Michael Curley	80,376	29.46
Malcolm Nichols	55,247	20.25
William J. Foley	28,184	10.33
Alfred Santosuosso	2,927	1.07
Carleton L. Brett	543	0.19
All others	337	0.12

== See also ==
- List of mayors of Boston, Massachusetts
