= Statue of Maurice J. Tobin =

Statue in Boston, Massachusetts, U.S.

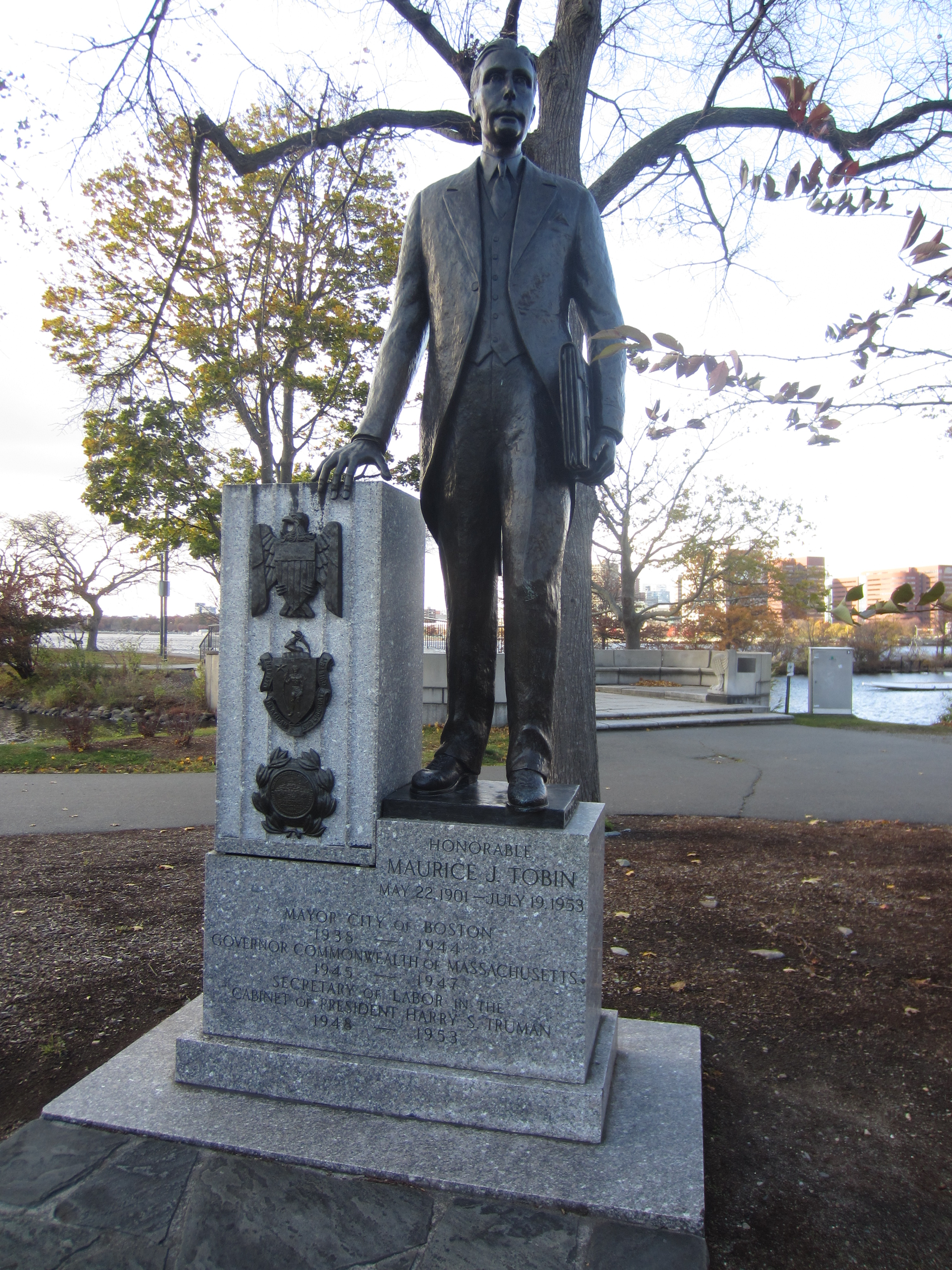
- The statue in 2019
- Artist: Emilius R. Ciampa
- Year: 1958
- Medium: Bronze sculpture
- Subject: Maurice J. Tobin
- Location: Boston, Massachusetts, U.S.; 42°21′25.6″N 71°4′26.9″W

A statue of Boston mayor and state governor Maurice J. Tobin by Emilius R. Ciampa is installed along the city's Charles River Esplanade, in the U.S. state of Massachusetts.

== Description and history ==
The 1958 bronze sculpture is approximately 10 ft. tall and 2 ft. wide, and rests on a granite base that measures approximately 6 x 4 x 2 ft. The work was commissioned by the Commonwealth of Massachusetts, and surveyed by the Smithsonian Institution's "Save Outdoor Sculpture!" program in 1997.

== See also ==
- 1958 in art
