= Emilius R. Ciampa =

Italian-American sculptor

Emilius R. Ciampa (1896–1996) was an American sculptor and artist. Born in Taurasi, Italy, Ciampa was the second youngest of 6 children. His father was a building contractor and his mother ran a café in the 1st floor of the family house (the family lived upstairs).

Ciampa's family immigrated to America when he was 10 years old, four years after his father died from a scaffolding accident. They moved to the North End of Boston, where he was put into St. Anthony’s parochial school, connected with St. Leonard’s Parish. Before he was able to speak or write English he communicated to the nuns by drawing pictures. They soon realized that he had artistic potential, so they had him do all of the artwork for the classroom. At the age of 12, by special permission obtained by his art teacher, Emilius was allowed to attend the evening classes in drawing and modeling at the North Bennet Street Industrial School in Boston. He won several art prizes at Bennett, including a 2nd prize award of $2.50 for Greatest Improvement in the Modeling Class.

Later, Ciampa attended the Belle Arti School, and also took classes at the Copley Art Studio, the Butera Art School, and the Normal Art School, which was later known as the Massachusetts College of Art. He was also mentored by the celebrated modeler and carver, Johannes Kirchmayer. At age 21, he opened his own studio where he gave private lessons in the Fine Arts.

In 1918 (at age 22) he became a soldier in World War 1, stationed in France. He was put in the camouflage unit because of his artwork. Ciampa kept a detailed notebook of the camouflage techniques and also made many sketches for the soldier’s newspaper and for various French periodicals. Soon after he returned from the war, he met and married his first wife Ethel (Colson). He became professionally associated with Ernest Pellegrini, nationally known sculptor, and later opened his own studio. It was around this time that he completed one of his first big statues, of St. Anthony with baby Jesus, for St. Leonard's Church in Boston.

In 1922, Ciampa went to Florida to open up the Coral Gables Art Stone Company and Boca Raton Galleries. While in Florida, he also went to Havana, Cuba, to supervise extensive art projects. He lost everything (house, studio, statuary, belongings) in the hurricane of 1926 and moved back to the Boston area, where he again opened studios and worked for various prominent concerns, traveling all over the United States on numerous art commissions.

Emilius’ sons Roger and Elroy were both born while he was in Florida, and a few years later, in 1930, his youngest son Edwin was born. In 1937 Emilius’ middle son Elroy died from complications resulting from a skating accident and not long afterwards, he and his first wife divorced.

In 1941, Emilius completed “The Supreme Sacrifice,” a World War I memorial for the Oak Grove Cemetery in Medford, MA. The large statue depicts a standing World War I soldier with his arms extended out at his sides and his face turned slightly toward heaven. He completed several other war memorials in the following years including the Veteran’s Memorial in Mt. Hope Cemetery, Boston; the 22 foot high “Angel of Victory and Peace”, located in Oak Grove Cemetery in Medford; and the Victory statue, located next to the courthouse in Framingham, MA. Many of his biggest projects were commissioned for the Commonwealth of Massachusetts, the City of Boston, and various other towns and cities within Massachusetts, though he also did considerable work in other parts of the country.

He also completed numerous life-size portraits in bronze, granite, or marble, such as the statue of Tobin near the Hatch Shell, as well as numerous plaques which can be found throughout Boston, including the Boston University Bridge Plaque, the Veteran’s Memorial in the State House, the Amelia Earhardt memorial on the Mystic River Dam, the plaque for the Paul Revere Mall, and the Arthur Feidler plaque at the Arthur Fiedler Bridge (all in the greater Boston area).

Ciampa married his second wife, Elsie, in 1956, and the year after they were married, he began managing the Caproni Galleries in the South End of Boston. The gallery specialized in antique reproductions, and was one of the last galleries in the world that was allowed to make molds directly from the ancient statues in Europe. In 1960, the Caproni Galleries were sold and Ciampa moved everything into his home studio in Lexington MA.

He continued to sculpt for over 30 more years, well into his 90s, producing other important works. However, in his later years he did far more painting than sculpturing, as painting was a much less difficult medium to work with. He always gave away his paintings to his family and friends and whoever else came to visit him at his house. He enjoyed both watercolor and oil painting, and painted profusely until just before his death, which came just one week short of his 100th birthday.

Emilius stated that “As sculptors, we owe to each of their memories the best our creative imaginations can conceive and our hands produce.”
