= William Francis Murray =

American politician

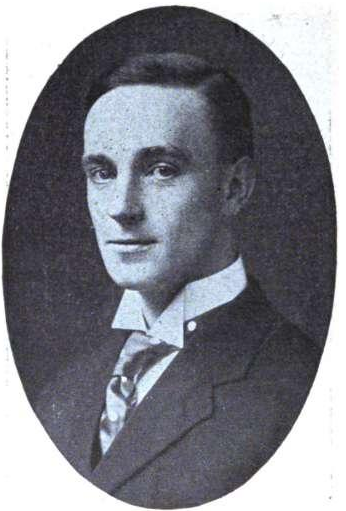
- William Francis Murray circa 1912

Member of the U.S. House of Representatives from Massachusetts
- In office March 4, 1911 – September 28, 1914
- Preceded by: John A. Keliher
- Succeeded by: Peter Francis Tague
- Constituency: 9th district (1911–13); 10th district (1913–14)

Massachusetts Executive Council
- In office 1910–1911

Massachusetts House of Representatives
- In office 1907–1908

City of Boston Common Council
- In office 1904–1904

Personal details
- Born: September 7, 1881 Boston, Massachusetts, U.S.
- Died: September 21, 1918 (aged 37) Boston, Massachusetts, U.S.
- Party: Democratic
- Education: Harvard College; Harvard Law School
- Profession: Attorney

Military service
- Years of service: 1898
- Rank: Corporal
- Unit: United States Volunteer Signal Corps
- Battles/wars: Spanish–American War

William Francis Murray (September 7, 1881 – September 21, 1918) was a U.S. representative from Massachusetts and the Postmaster of Boston.

Born in Boston, Massachusetts, Murray attended the public schools and the Boston Latin School. He graduated from Harvard University in 1904 and Harvard Law School in 1906. He practiced law in Boston. He served as a United States Volunteer Signal Corps corporal during the Spanish-American War. He served as a member of the Boston Common Council in 1904 and 1905. He served as a member of the State House of Representatives in 1907 and 1908. He served as a member of the Governor's council in 1910

== Election to Congress ==
Murray challenged incumbent and fellow Democrat John A. Keliher in 1910. He defeated Keliher in both the primary and general. At age 29, Murray was the youngest member of the Sixty-second Congress. He was reelected to the Sixty-third Congress where he was a strong backer of Woodrow Wilson. He served as a member of Congress from March 4, 1911, until September 28, 1914, when he resigned, having been appointed postmaster of Boston.

== Postmaster of Boston ==
On June 19, 1914, President Wilson nominated Murray for the position of Postmaster of Boston. The Senate Confirmed the nomination on July 16, 1914. Murray served as postmaster from October 1, 1914, until his death on September 21, 1918.

== Death ==
In the Autumn of 1918, Murray contracted the Spanish flu and died from pneumonia at Boston City Hospital at 11:40 on the night of September 21, 1918.

== Burial ==
Murray was interred in Holyhood Cemetery, the Chestnut Hill section of Brookline, Massachusetts.

== Bibliography ==
- Who's who in State Politics, 1912 Practical Politics (1912) p. 24.
- United States Congress. "William Francis Murray (id: M001117)". Biographical Directory of the United States Congress.

U.S. House of Representatives
| Preceded by James M. Curley | Member of the U.S. House of Representatives from Massachusetts's 10th congressional district March 4, 1913 – September 28, 1914 | Succeeded by Peter Tague |
