= 1944 Massachusetts gubernatorial election =

- November 7, 1944
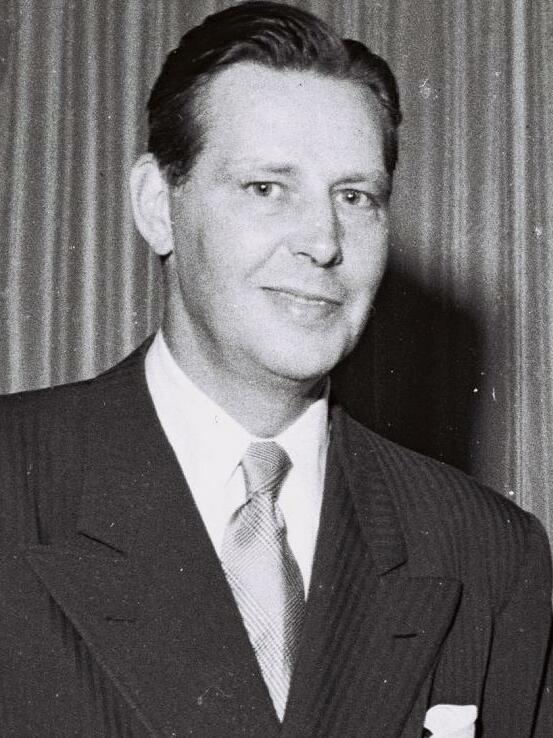

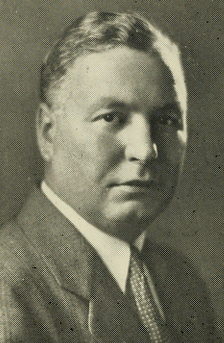
Nominee	Maurice J. Tobin	Horace T. Cahill
Party	Democratic	Republican
Popular vote	1,048,284	897,708
Percentage	53.64%	45.94%
- Tobin: 40–50% 50–60% 60–70% 70–80% 80–90% Cahill: 40–50% 50–60% 60–70% 70–80% 80–90% >90%
Governor before election
Leverett Saltonstall
Republican
Elected Governor
Maurice J. Tobin
Democratic

The 1944 Massachusetts gubernatorial election was held on November 7, 1944. Incumbent Republican Governor Leverett Saltonstall did not run for reelection, choosing instead to run in the United States Senate special election to succeed Henry Cabot Lodge Jr. In the open race to succeed him, Democratic mayor of Boston Maurice J. Tobin defeated Republican Lieutenant Governor Horace T. Cahill.

== Republican primary ==
Horace T. Cahill ran unopposed in the Republican primary.

== Democratic primary ==
Boston mayor Maurice J. Tobin defeated state treasurer Francis X. Hurley for the Democratic nomination for governor.

Democratic gubernatorial primary, 1944
Party	Candidate	Votes	%	±%
Democratic	Maurice J. Tobin	131,889	62.51%	
Democratic	Francis X. Hurley	79,084	37.49%	

== General election ==
=== Results ===
Massachusetts gubernatorial election, 1944
Party	Candidate	Votes	%	±%
Democratic	Maurice J. Tobin	1,048,284	53.64%	
Republican	Horace T. Cahill	897,708	45.94%	
Socialist Labor	Henning A. Blomen	5,176	0.27%	
Prohibition	Guy S. Williams	2,988	0.15%	

== See also ==
- 1943–1944 Massachusetts legislature
