= James Michael Curley =

American politician (1874–1958)

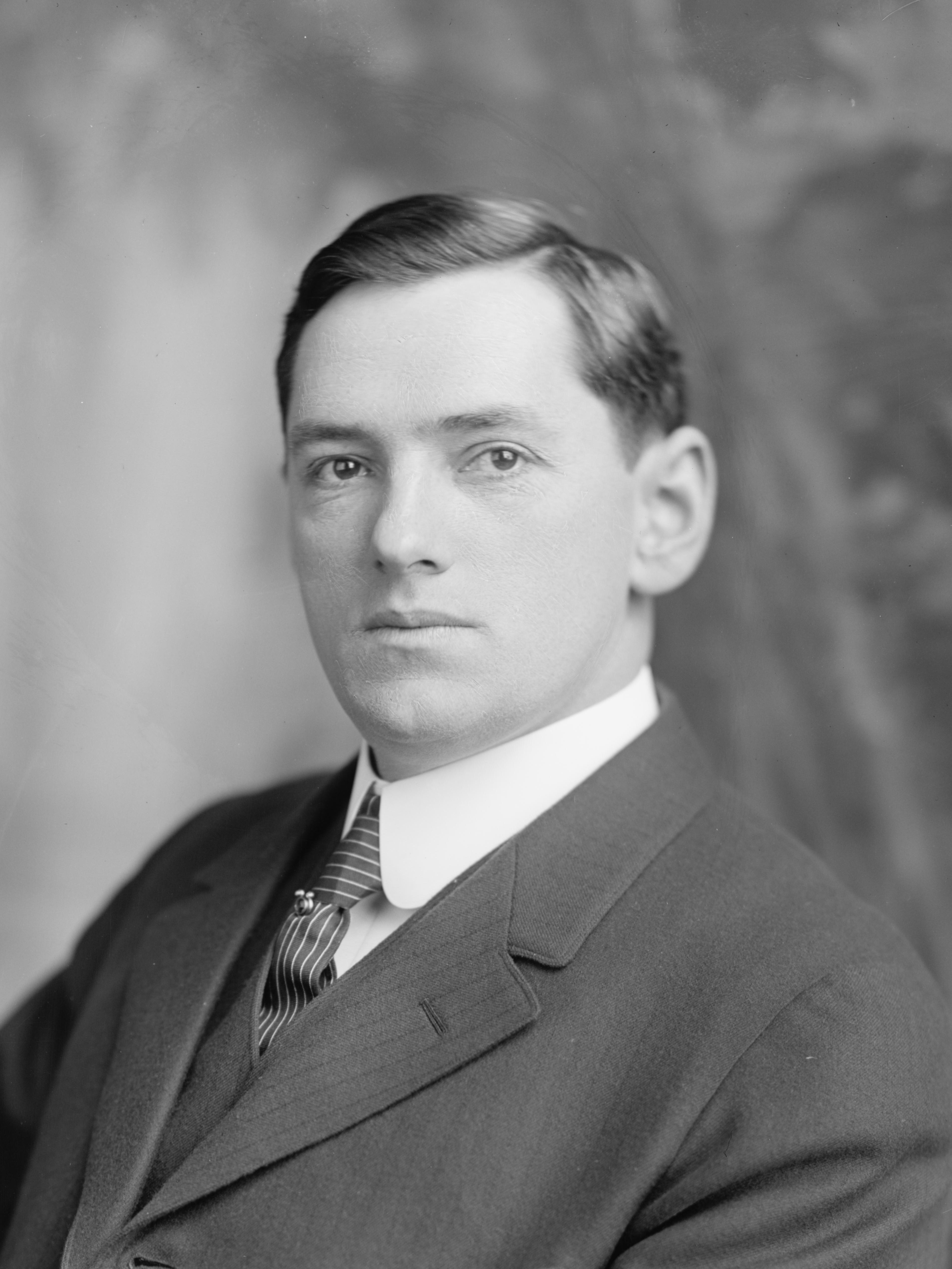

53rd Governor of Massachusetts
- In office January 3, 1935 – January 7, 1937
- Lieutenant: Joseph L. Hurley
- Preceded by: Joseph B. Ely
- Succeeded by: Charles F. Hurley

Mayor of Boston
- In office January 7, 1946 – January 2, 1950
- Preceded by: John E. Kerrigan (acting)
- Succeeded by: John Hynes
- In office January 6, 1930 – January 1, 1934
- Preceded by: Malcolm Nichols
- Succeeded by: Frederick Mansfield
- In office February 6, 1922 – January 4, 1926
- Preceded by: Andrew James Peters
- Succeeded by: Malcolm Nichols
- In office February 2, 1914 – February 4, 1918
- Preceded by: John F. Fitzgerald
- Succeeded by: Andrew James Peters

Member of the U.S. House of Representatives from Massachusetts
- In office January 3, 1943 – January 3, 1947
- Preceded by: Thomas A. Flaherty
- Succeeded by: John F. Kennedy
- Constituency: 11th district
- In office March 4, 1911 – February 4, 1914
- Preceded by: Joseph F. O'Connell
- Succeeded by: James A. Gallivan
- Constituency: 10th district (1911–1913); 12th district (1913–1914)

2nd President of the United States Conference of Mayors
- In office 1933
- Preceded by: Frank Murphy
- Succeeded by: T. Semmes Walmsley

Acting Chairman of the Boston Board of Aldermen
- In office 1909
- Preceded by: Louis M. Clark
- Succeeded by: Frederick J. Brand

Member of the Boston Board of Aldermen
- In office 1905–1909

Member of the Massachusetts House of Representatives from the 4th Suffolk district
- In office 1902–1903

Member of the Boston Common Council
- In office 1901

Personal details
- Born: November 20, 1874 Boston, Massachusetts, U.S.
- Died: November 12, 1958 (aged 83) Boston, Massachusetts, U.S.
- Party: Democratic
- Spouses: Mary Herlihy (m. 1906; died 1930) Gertrude Casey (m. 1937)
- Children: 9 children 2 stepsons

James Michael Curley (November 20, 1874 – November 12, 1958) was an American Democratic politician from Boston, Massachusetts. He served four terms as mayor of Boston between 1914 and 1950. Curley ran for mayor in every election for which he was legally qualified. He was twice convicted of criminal behavior and notably served time in prison during his last term as mayor. He also served a single term as governor of Massachusetts. He is remembered as one of the most colorful figures in Massachusetts politics.

Curley also served two terms, separated by 30 years, in the United States House of Representatives and, in his early career, served in the Boston Common Council, Boston Board of Aldermen, and Massachusetts House of Representatives.

Curley was immensely popular with his fellow working class Roman Catholic Irish Americans. During the Great Depression in the United States, he raised taxes and spent freely on various improvements. He enlarged Boston City Hospital, expanded public transit, funded projects to improve roads and bridges, and improved the neighborhoods with beaches and bathhouses, playgrounds and parks, public schools, and libraries. In addition to their own benefits, these projects provided jobs, needed by the working class during the Depression. At the same time, he was regularly collecting bribes, kickbacks, and other graft.

He was a leading and at times divisive force in the Massachusetts Democratic Party, challenging Boston's ward bosses and the party's white Anglo-Saxon Protestant leadership at the local and state levels. His political tactics, which tended to drive businesses and economically successful people from the city, damaging the local economy, have become an object of study for economists and political scientists. A 1993 survey of historians, political scientists and urban experts conducted by Melvin G. Holli of the University of Illinois at Chicago ranked Curley as the fourth-worst American big-city mayor to have served between the years 1820 and 1993.

== Early life ==
James Michael Curley was born in Boston's Roxbury neighborhood in 1874 to Michael and Sarah Curley (née Clancy).

Curley's father Michael immigrated from Oughterard, County Galway, Ireland and settled in Roxbury, where he met Curley's mother, also from County Galway. Michael Curley worked as a day laborer and foot soldier for Democratic ward boss P. James "Pea-Jacket" Maguire.

Michael Curley died in 1884, when his son James was ten.

James and his brother John worked to supplement the meager family income, while James took classes at the local public school. Curley left school at fifteen and took jobs in factory work and delivery which exposed him to much of the growing industrial city of Boston. He sought to become a fire fighter but was too young to take the job.

His mother is likely responsible for instilling in him the strain of generosity that would make up a significant part of his public personality. Curley's mother continually intervened to turn him away from his father's unsavory associates while working at a job scrubbing floors in offices and churches all over Boston.

== Political rise ==
As Curley came of age, Boston politics were marked by growing Irish political power in opposition to traditional Yankee Protestantism. Curley involved himself in the local Roman Catholic church and the Ancient Order of Hibernians, a fraternal benefit society that assisted Irish immigrants. He acquired a reputation as a hustler who was willing to help others get ahead.

Curley gained experience in the traditional practices of ward politics such as knocking on doors, drumming up votes, and taking complaints. He ran for a seat on the Boston Common Council in 1897 and 1898, but failed to achieve the Democratic nomination in ward caucuses each year. Curley claimed he was denied victory by corrupt vote counting, rigged against him because he was outside the political machine.

Curley was successful in 1899 by joining the machine faction controlled by Charles I. Quirk. In his first two years on the Council, Curley placed roughly 700 people into patronage positions. His reputation as an urban populist earned him the unofficial title "Mayor of the Poor."

=== Boston Common Council (1900) ===
In 1900 Curley became the youngest ward boss in Boston at 26 years of age. He obtained through political maneuvering positions on Boston's Board of Aldermen. Curley became a member of the Boston Common Council in 1901, representing the seventeenth ward.

=== State Representative (1902–03) ===
Curley won election to the Massachusetts House of Representatives in 1901 and became the chair of the Ward 17 Democratic organization. He established the Tammany Club (named in a nod to the New York City Tammany Hall political club) as a platform for his personal political activities, including speechmaking and assisting needy constituents. Curley later recounted stories of the ward's poor and needy lining up outside the club's office to ask for work or subsistence.

=== Boston Board of Aldermen (1905–1909) ===
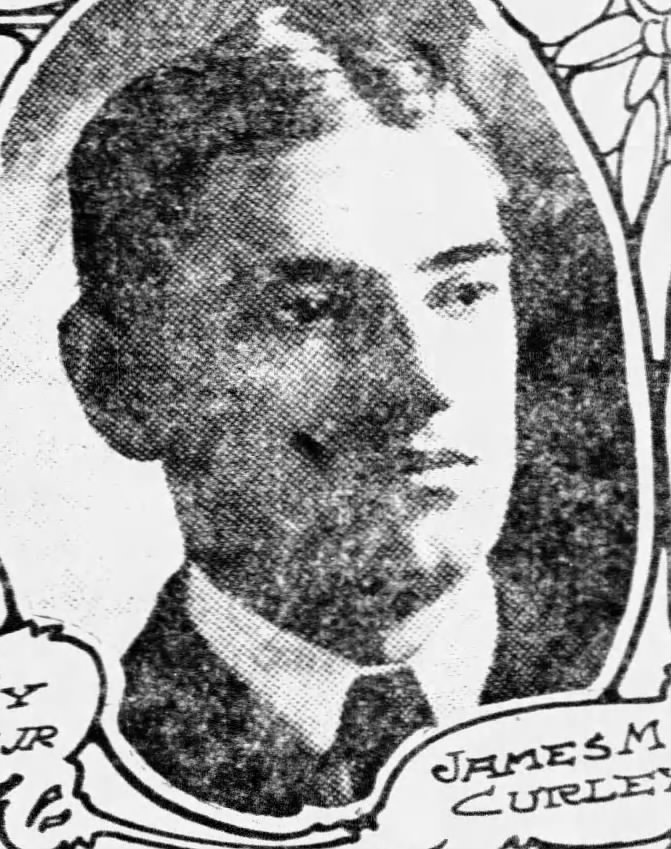
Curley circa 1908

Curley served on the Boston Board of Aldermen from 1905 until 1909, when the Boston Board of Alderman and the Boston City Council were merged to become the unicameral Boston City Council.

Curley's first public notoriety came from being elected to Boston's board of aldermen in 1904 while imprisoned on a fraud conviction. The charge resulted after Curley and the unrelated Thomas Curley had helped two applicants in their district cheat on federal civil service exams for postmen, by criminally impersonating the applicants and taking the exams for them. Though the incident gave him a dark reputation in Boston's non-Irish circles, it aided his image among the Irish American working class and poor because they saw him as a man willing to stick his neck out to help those in need. During that election, his campaign slogan was, "he did it for a friend." He also quickly gained a reputation for taking kickbacks in exchange for his support.

In January 1909, after the board had been unable to garner the required consensus to elect a new board chairman, Curley briefly served as the acting chairman in the interim. On January 26, 1909, the board elected Frederick J. Brand its permanent chairman.

=== U.S. Congress (1911–1914) ===
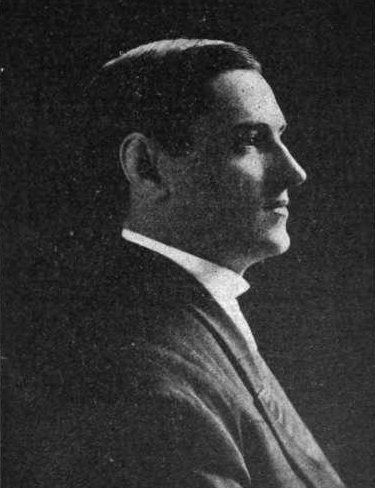
James Michael Curley during his first term as a Member of Congress in 1912

In 1910, while a member of Boston's board of aldermen, Curley challenged U.S. Representative Joseph F. O'Connell, a fellow Democrat.

His first preference was to run for mayor of Boston, but former Mayor (and czar of Boston Irish politics) John "Honey Fitz" Fitzgerald ran for the office. In exchange for Curley staying out of the mayoral race, Fitzgerald promised not to run for re-election after a single four-year term. In the previous election for the seat, O'Connell won by a four-vote margin over his Republican opponent, ex-City Clerk J. Mitchel Galvin.

In a three-way primary among O'Connell, Curley, and O'Connell's predecessor William S. McNary, Curley defeated O'Connell and McNary. After winning the nomination of the Democratic Party, Curley went on to win the general election by a substantial plurality over Galvin, who was again the Republican nominee.

== First mayoralty (1914–1918) ==
Despite his deal with Curley, Mayor Fitzgerald did run for re-election in the election held in January 1914. Curley secured Fitzgerald's exit from the race by threatening to expose a dalliance the older man had with a cigarette girl in a Boston gambling den. Curley was aided by Daniel H. Coakley, a lawyer whose specialties included extortion and bribing prosecutors to bury criminal charges against his clients. Fitzgerald withdrew, and Curley won the election over City Council president Thomas Kenny.

Curley's victory marked his consolidation of control over Boston politics, which he would retain until 1950. He served four separate terms as mayor (1914–1918, 1922–1926, 1930–1934 and 1946–1950) and always held influence even when he wasn't in that office.

In his first term, Curley embarked on a series of public improvements, a practice he continued in his later terms as mayor. His projects included the development of recreational facilities in the poorer parts of the city, expansion of public transit, and an enlargement of Boston City Hospital. He accomplished this with little regard for city finances, raising property taxes and securing loans from city banks, sometimes by threatening city inspectional actions against bank facilities. He deliberately tweaked the sensibilities of the Protestant "good government" advocates, suggesting that the Boston Public Garden be sold off and that the historic Shirley-Eustis House be razed for failing to meet modern codes.

During his first term, Curley moved his family into a luxurious mansion in Jamaica Plain, one plainly beyond the means of a typical civil servant's salary. Begun in 1915, the twenty-plus room house was apparently built for little or no charge by contractors seeking favors from Curley. Curley's finances were regularly investigated by the Boston Finance Commission, a body dominated by hostile Protestant Republicans, but he eluded legal charges—in part through Coakley's intervention. Curley also effectively muzzled press investigations by threatening libel charges against offending media. In one notable incident, he also physically assaulted the publisher of the Boston Telegraph for publishing unflattering articles.

Curley's attempt at reelection was foiled by Martin Lomasney, the boss of Boston's West End. Lomasney, a longtime opposition figure to Curley in the city, orchestrated the entry of an Irish-American candidate (Congressman James A. Gallivan) into the 1917 mayoral race, who successfully siphoned enough votes away from Curley to hand victory to Republican Andrew J. Peters. In 1918, the state legislature dealt Curley a further blow by enacting legislation forbidding Boston mayors from holding consecutive terms.

== Second mayoralty (1922–1926) ==
Portrait photograph of Curley, circa 1921

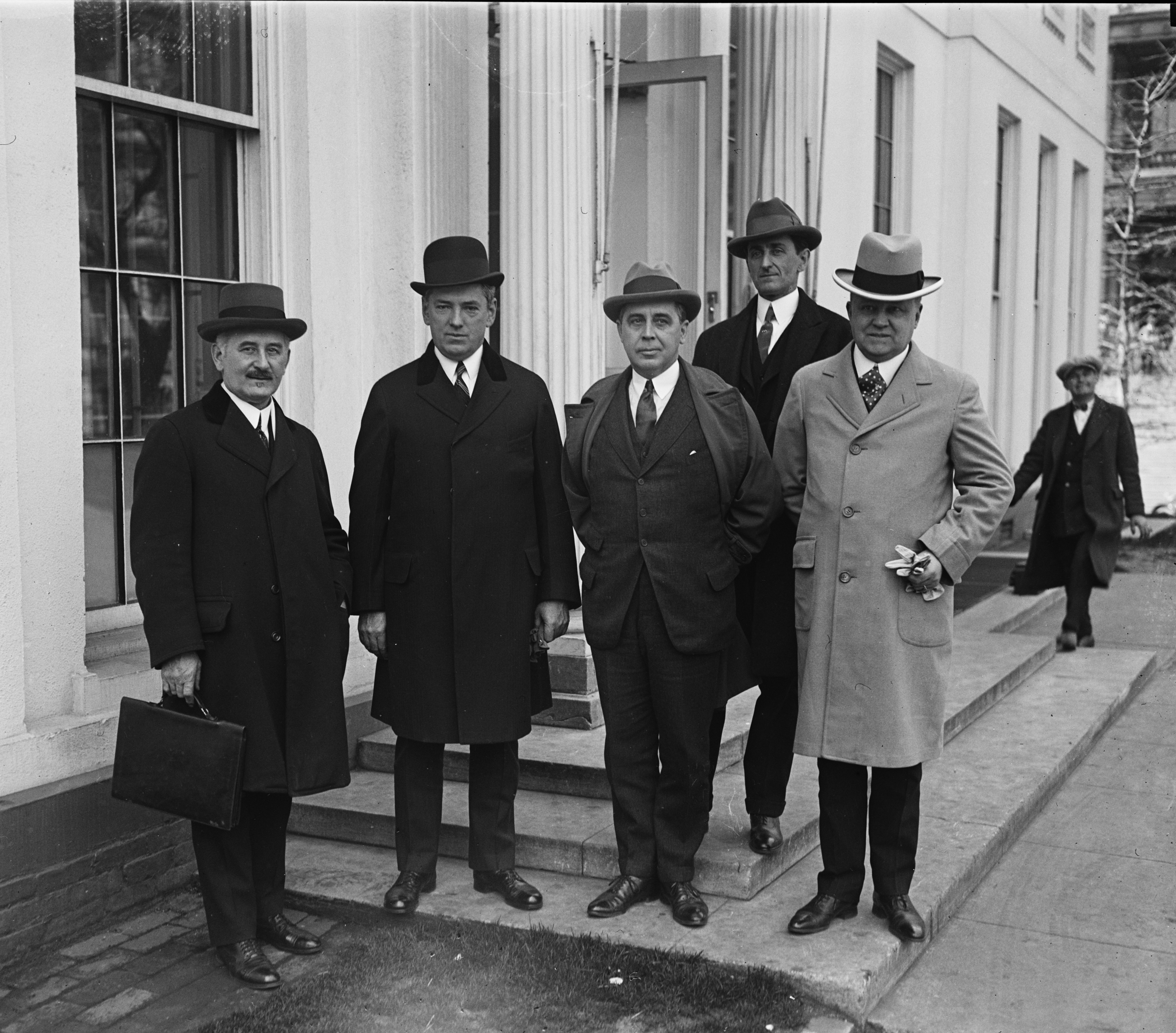
Mayor Curley (second from left) leads a delegation visiting the White House on April 6, 1925, to lobby President Calvin Coolidge for the establishment of a veterans hospital at Fort Strong

Curley won a second term as mayor in 1921.

In 1924, while serving as mayor, Curley ran for Governor of Massachusetts. He was defeated by Republican Lieutenant Governor Alvan T. Fuller.

Pursuant to a new one-term restriction, Curley was not able to run for re-election in 1925.

== Third mayoralty (1930–1934) ==
In 1929, Curley won a third non-consecutive term as mayor.

In 1932, Governor Joseph B. Ely denied Curley a place in the Massachusetts delegation to the 1932 Democratic National Convention. Instead, Curley engineered his selection as a delegate from Puerto Rico under the alias of Alcalde (Spanish for "Mayor") Jaime Curleo. Some say Curley's support was instrumental in Franklin D. Roosevelt's nomination at the convention, but Curley broke with Roosevelt after the president refused to appoint him Ambassador to Ireland.

In 1933, Curley served as the president of the United States Conference of Mayors.

== Governorship (1935–1937) ==
Portrait photograph of Curley as governor

In 1934, amid a more favorable national and statewide environment for Democrats, Curley ran for Governor again. This time, he defeated Republican Lieutenant Governor Gaspar G. Bacon, an opponent of Roosevelt's New Deal, by more than 100,000.

Curley's single term as governor was described by one commentator as "ludicrous part of the time, shocking most of the time, and tawdry all of the time." It began with a shoving match with outgoing Governor Ely and descended into bare-knuckle politics. Curley expended significant political capital seeking to defang the Boston Finance Commission, which was closing in on the financial malfeasance of his mayoral administrations. Committee members were accused of failing to do their jobs and impeached, and investigators were fired. Curley was eventually able to install a more pliant commission and turned its attention to his political opponents. The negative press surrounding these actions ensured a loss of public popularity, as did his failure to significantly address widespread unemployment. His administration embarked on one major public works project, the Quabbin Reservoir, whose construction contracts were issued in signature Curley style.

In 1935, in a tweak at the state's WASP elite, Curley appeared at Harvard's commencement (a traditional ceremonial function of the Governor) wearing silk stockings, knee britches, a powdered wig, and a three-cornered hat with flowing plume. When University marshals objected, the story goes, Curley reportedly whipped out a copy of the Statutes of the Massachusetts Bay Colony which prescribed proper dress for the occasion and claimed that he was the only person at the ceremony properly dressed, thereby endearing him to many working and middle class Yankees.

Curley's term as governor of Massachusetts has been characterized by one biographer as "a disaster mitigated only by moments of farce" for its free spending and corruption.

In 1936, instead of seeking reelection, Curley ran for the United States Senate. He lost the race to State Representative Henry Cabot Lodge Jr., a moderate Republican, despite a national landslide in favor of Democrats.

== Initial post-governorship ==
After leaving the office of Governor, Curley squandered a substantial sum of his money in unsuccessful investments in Nevada gold mines; then he lost a civil suit brought by the Suffolk County prosecutor that forced him to forfeit to the city of Boston the $40,000 he received from General Equipment Company for "fixing" a damage claim settlement.

Curley was twice defeated, in November 1937 and November 1941, for the Boston mayoralty by one of his former political confidants, Maurice J. Tobin. Curley took his revenge against Tobin later, supporting Republican Robert F. Bradford for Governor against Tobin in 1946.

In 1938, he made another run for the governorship, defeating incumbent Democrat Governor Charles F. Hurley in a close primary, but losing the general election to Republican Leverett Saltonstall, the former speaker of the Massachusetts House of Representatives.

== Return to the U.S. Congress (1943–1947) ==
Portrait of Curley, circa 1943

In 1942, Curley managed to revive his faltering career by returning to Congress, challenging Democratic incumbent Thomas H. Eliot.

Eliot was a former New Deal attorney with an exemplary voting record on behalf of the Roosevelt administration, but was also the son of a Unitarian minister and grandson of Harvard president Charles William Eliot. Curley exploited Eliot's background to appeal to working class anger against the Yankee upper class and, in a campaign speech which has entered Boston political lore, suggested Eliot had Communist leanings: "There is more Americanism in one half of Jim Curley's ass than in that pink body of Tom Eliot." Thus, despite his long-proven corruption and antagonism against the Yankee population, Curley managed to win them over in substantial numbers. He won the primarily easily and was re-elected in 1944.

== Fourth mayoralty (1946–1950) ==
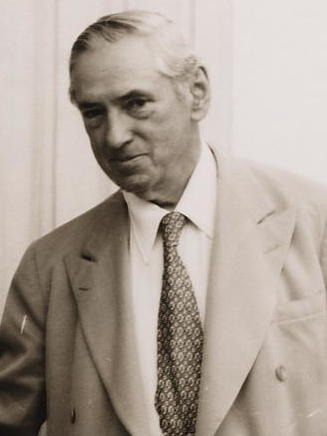
Curley during his final term in office in July 1949

In 1945, Curley opted to vacate his seat in Congress to run for a fourth non-consecutive term as mayor of Boston. Curley appears to have been paid off by Joseph P. Kennedy (who supposedly agreed to pay off some of Curley's debt and may have helped fund his 1949 run for reelection) to vacate the seat so that Kennedy's son John could run for Congress in 1946 without significant Democratic opposition.

=== Conviction and imprisonment ===
By his fourth mayoral term, numerous investigations had been conducted against Curley's machine during his time in Congress, and he now faced felony indictments for bribery brought by federal prosecutors. Nonetheless, Curley's popularity with the Irish American community in Boston remained incredibly high in the face of his indictment. He campaigned on the slogan "Curley Gets Things Done." A second indictment by a federal grand jury, for mail fraud, did not harm his campaign either, and Curley won the election with 45% of the vote.

In June 1947, Curley was accused of accepting $60,000 from the Engineers Group, a firm Curley headed which was under investigation for war profiteering. He was found guilty of mail fraud and sentenced to 6–18 months at the Federal Correctional Institution in Danbury, Connecticut. Under pressure from the Massachusetts congressional delegation (with the exception of John F. Kennedy, whose maternal grandfather, John F. Fitzgerald was forced out of the 1914 mayoral race by Curley) and in consideration of Curley's poor health, President Truman commuted his sentence after only five months. City Clerk John B. Hynes served as acting mayor during Curley's time in prison.

=== Return after prison sentence ===
A crowd of thousands greeted Curley upon his return to Boston, with a brass band playing "Hail to the Chief". In a fit of hubris after his first day back in office, Curley told reporters, "I have accomplished more in one day than has been done in the five months of my absence."

In 1949, Curley was opposed for re-election by Hynes, who took Curley's public comments as a personal affront and marshaled support to defeat him. While Curley argued Hynes lacked experience, Hynes responded that the city could not "afford the city bosses anymore," and tapped into widespread dissatisfaction with the city's high tax rate to defeat Curley in the primary. During his lame duck period, Curley granted a large number of tax abatements and granted exorbitant city contracts to cronies, further hampering the city's finances.

Hynes was again victorious in a November 1951 rematch, ending Curley's half-century career in elective politics.

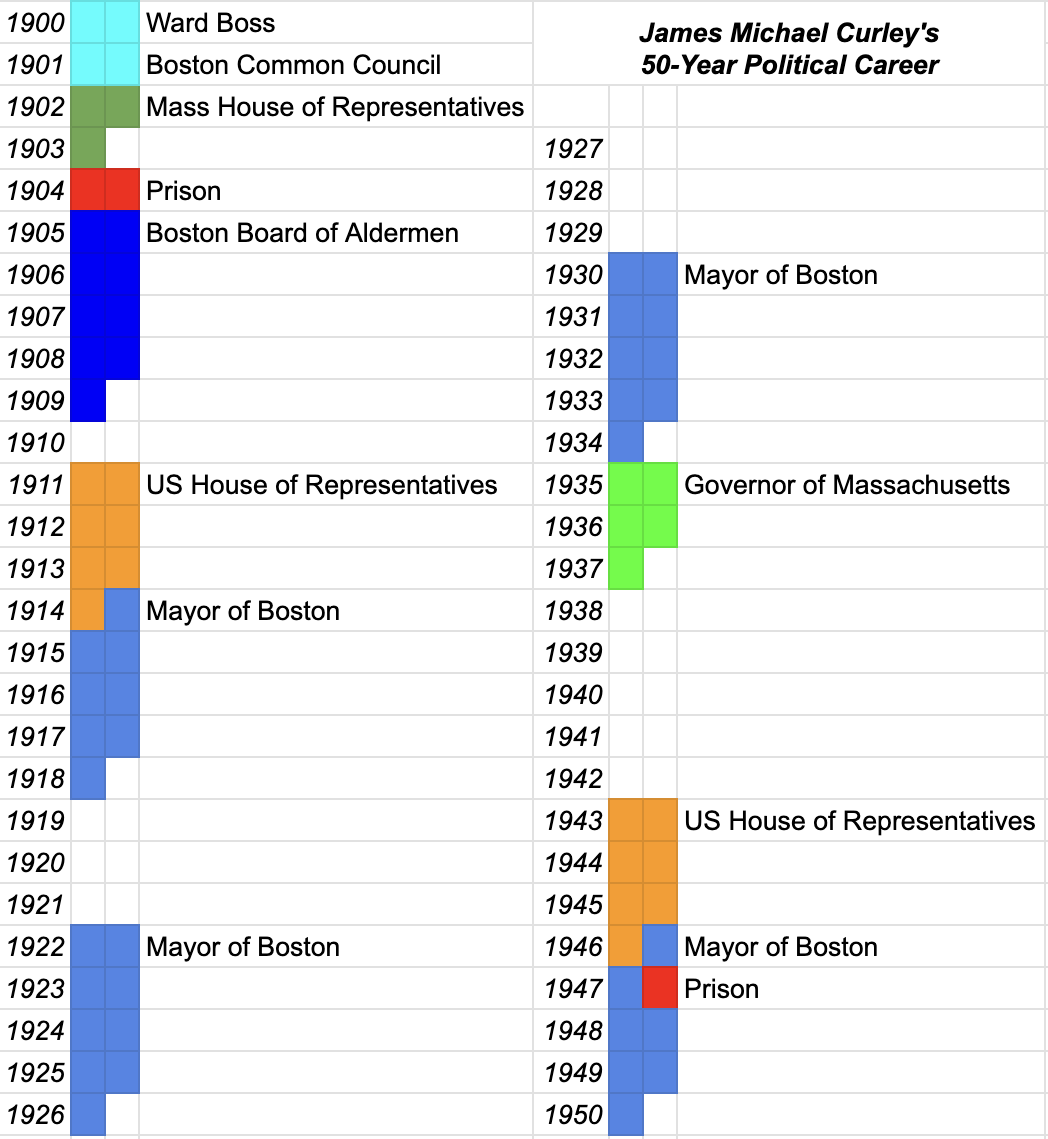
Infographic of the different offices held by James Michael Curley between 1900 and 1950

== Retirement ==
In retirement, Curley was financially supported by a state-granted pension ushered through the legislature by Tip O'Neill. Curley continued to support other candidates and remained active within the Democratic Party after his defeats. His death in Boston in 1958 was followed by one of the largest funerals in the city's history. He is buried at Roslindale's Mount Calvary Cemetery.

== Personal life ==
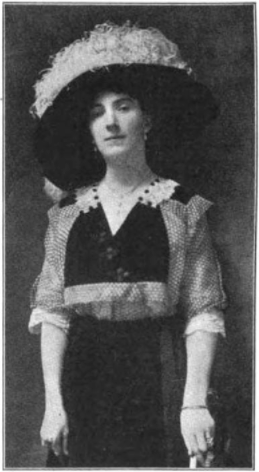
Mary Emelda Curley (née Herlihy)

James had two brothers: John J. (1872–1944) and Michael (born 1879), who died at 2½.

Curley married Mary Emelda (née Herlihy) (1884–1930). After her death, he remarried to Gertrude Casey Dennis, widowed mother of two boys, George and Richard.

Curley's personal life was unusually tragic. He outlived his first wife and seven of his nine children. His first wife, Mary Emelda, died in 1930 after a long battle with cancer. Their twin sons, John and Joseph, died in infancy. One of Curley's daughters, Dorothea, died of pneumonia as a teenager. Curley's namesake son, James Jr., a Harvard Law student groomed as Curley's political successor, died in 1931 at the age of 23 following an operation to remove a gallstone. Another son, Paul, who was an alcoholic, died during Curley's 1945 mayoral run. Curley's remaining daughter, Mary, died of a stroke in February 1950. When Mary's brother Leo was called to the scene, he became so distraught that he too suffered a cerebral hemorrhage and died the same day at age 35. Curley was outlived by his two remaining sons, George (1919–1970) and Francis X. (1923–1992), the latter of whom was a Jesuit priest.

== Legacy ==
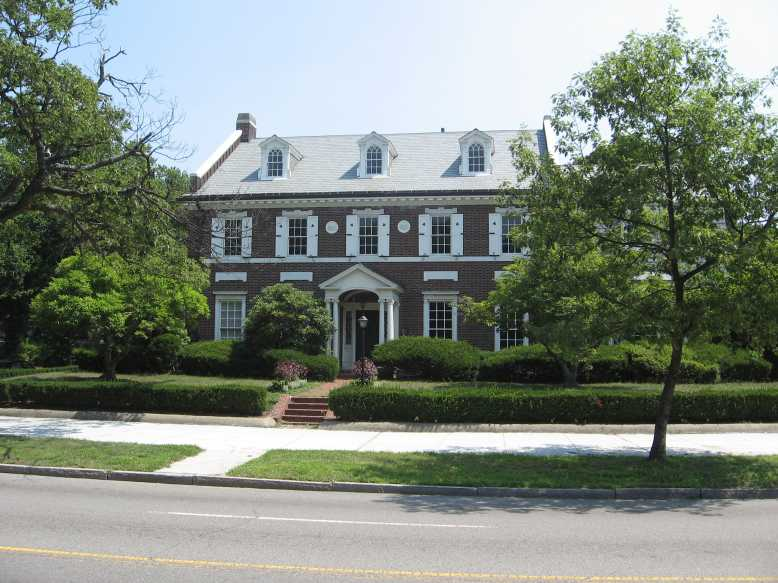
Curley's home in Jamaica Plain still stands today and can be identified by its distinctive shamrock-shaped cutouts in the second-floor window shutters.

He was a leading and at times divisive force in the Massachusetts Democratic Party, challenging Boston's ward bosses and the party's white Anglo-Saxon Protestant leadership at the local and state levels. His political tactics, which tended to drive businesses and economically successful people from the city, damaging the local economy, have become an object of study for economists and political scientists. A 1993 survey of historians, political scientists and urban experts conducted by Melvin G. Holli of the University of Illinois at Chicago ranked Curley as the fourth-worst American big-city mayor to have served between the years 1820 and 1993.

Historian James M. O'Toole has argued:

Surely there has been no more flamboyant political personality than James Michael Curley, who dominated politics in Boston for half a century. Whether as incumbent or as candidate, he was always there: alderman, congressman, mayor, governor. People loved him or hated him, but they could not ignore him. He mastered the politics of ethnic and class warfare by defining a manichaean world of "us" versus "them". ... He presided over state and city during the challenge of the Depression, leaving behind impressive monuments in stone and public works. In the end, he even managed to enter American political mythology, remembered as much in his fictional incarnations as for his real life.

Urban historian Kenneth T. Jackson has argued that:

Curley was among the best-known and most colorful of the big-city, paternalistic bosses, Irish, Catholic, and Democratic ... Capitalizing on Irish-American resentment against the Republican, Harvard-educated Brahmans who dominated Boston's social and economic life, Curley liked to think of himself as "Mayor of the Poor". ... Curley helped immigrants to adjust to urban life by finding them jobs, easing their troubles with the law, building them playgrounds and public baths, and attending their weddings and wakes. ... Because his feuds with fellow Irish chieftains like John (Honey Fitz) Fitzgerald, Patrick Kennedy, and Martin Lomasney were legendary, he tried as mayor to centralize patronage and make the ward heeler obsolete. During the depression he used federal relief and work projects as a tool of his political ambitions. But Curley never built a really solid organization in Boston and never enjoyed the power or statewide influence of other well-known urban bosses.

The Curley House at 350 Jamaicaway, Jamaica Plain was designated a landmark by the Boston Landmarks Commission in 1989.

Curley is honored with two statues at Faneuil Hall. One shows him seated on a park bench. The other shows him standing, as if giving a speech, with a campaign button on his lapel. A few feet away was a bar named for one of his symbols, The Purple Shamrock.

Curley's strategy of driving opponents outside of the city, described by Harvard economists Andrei Shleifer and Edward Glaeser in "The Curley Effect: The Economics of Shaping the Electorate," increased his political base by using distortionary economic policies, leading to long-term economic stagnation.

== In popular culture ==
- Curley was the inspiration for the protagonist Frank Skeffington in the 1956 novel The Last Hurrah by Edwin O'Connor and the John Ford film of the same name. Curley initially considered legal action but changed his mind upon meeting O'Connor. He told O'Connor he enjoyed the book, the passage he enjoyed most being "the part where I die." He did successfully sue the film's producers.
- Curley was the inspiration for the song "The Rascal King" on the album Let's Face It by The Mighty Mighty Bosstones.
- The Curley family still holds Massachusetts auto registration number 5. It was, as of circa 1975, owned by his stepson Richard.
- In the final Southern Victory Series novel Settling Accounts: In at the Death by Harry Turtledove, Jim Curley was a candidate for Vice President of the United States.

== See also ==
- List of American federal politicians convicted of crimes
- List of federal political scandals in the United States
- Timeline of Boston, 1910s–1940s
- History of Irish Americans in Boston
- List of people pardoned or granted clemency by the president of the United States

Boston mayoral elections
Successful: January 1914, December 1921, November 1929, November 1945
Unsuccessful: December 1917, November 1937, November 1941, November 1949, November 1951, November 1955

== Bibliography ==
- Bulger, William M. "James Michael Curley: A Short Biography with Personal Reminiscences." Commonwealth Editions 2009.
- Beatty, Jack. The Rascal King: the Life and Times of James Michael Curley. 1992. ISBN 978-0201175998
- City of Boston Statistics Department Municipal Register for 1922 (1922) Frontispiece.
- Connolly, Michael C. "The First Hurrah: James Michael Curley Versus the 'Goo-goos' in the Boston Mayoralty Election of 1914." Historical Journal of Massachusetts 2002 30(1): 50–74. ISSN 0276-8313.
- Connolly, James J. "Reconstituting Ethnic Politics: Boston, 1909–1925." Social Science History (1995) 19(4): 479–509. ISSN 0145-5532.
- Dineen, Joseph F., The Purple Shamrock (1949), an authorized biography
- Kenneally, James. "Prelude to the Last Hurrah: the Massachusetts Senatorial Election of 1936." Mid-America 1980 62(1): 3–20. ISSN 0026-2927.
- Lapomarda, Vincent A. "Maurice Joseph Tobin: the Decline of Bossism in Boston." New England Quarterly (1970) 43(3): 355–381. ISSN 0028-4866.
- Lennon, Thomas, producer, Scandalous Mayor. Film. 58 min.; Thomas Lennon Productions, 1991. Distrib. by PBS Video, Alexandria
- Luthin, Reinhard H. (1954). "Ch. 2: James J. Curley: The Boston Brahmin-Baiter". American Demagogues: Twentieth Century. Beacon Press. pp. 17–43. ASIN B0007DN37C. LCCN 54-8428. OCLC 1098334.
- Nelson, Garrison (2017). John William McCormack: A Political Biography. Bloomsbury. ISBN 978-1628925173.
- O'Connor, Thomas H. (1984). Bibles, Brahmins, and Bosses, Second Edition. Boston: Boston Public Library. ISBN 0890731004.
- O'Connor, Thomas H. (1995). The Boston Irish: A Political History. Boston: Northeastern University Press. ISBN 978-1555532208.
- O'Neill, Gerard (2012). Rogues and Redeemers. New York: Crown Publisher. ISBN 978-0307405364.
- Piehler, G. Kurt. "Curley, James Michael" in American National Biography, 2000, American Council of Learned Societies.
- Steinberg, Alfred. The Bosses: Frank Hague, James Curley, Ed Crump, Huey Long, Gene Talmadge, Tom Pendergast – The Story of the Ruthless Men who Forged the American Political Machines that Dominated the Twenties and Thirties Macmillan, 1972.
- Trout, Charles H., Boston, the Great Depression, and the New Deal NY: Oxford University Press, 1977.
- Who's who in State Politics, 1912 Practical Politics (1912)
- Zolot, Herbert Marshall. "The Issue of Good Government and James Michael Curley: Curley and the Boston Scene from 1897–1918" Ph.D. dissertation, State University of New York, Stony Brook, 1975. Citation: DAI 1975 36(2): 1053-A.

U.S. House of Representatives
Preceded by Joseph F. O'Connell	Member of the U.S. House of Representatives from Massachusetts's 10th congressional district 1911–1913	Succeeded by William Francis Murray
Preceded by John W. Weeks	Member of the U.S. House of Representatives from Massachusetts's 12th congressional district 1913–1914	Succeeded by James A. Gallivan
Preceded by Thomas A. Flaherty	Member of the U.S. House of Representatives from Massachusetts's 11th congressional district 1943–1947	Succeeded by John F. Kennedy
Political offices
Preceded by John F. Fitzgerald	Mayor of Boston; 1914–1918	Succeeded by Andrew James Peters
Preceded by Andrew James Peters	Mayor of Boston; 1922–1926	Succeeded by Malcolm Nichols
Preceded by Malcolm Nichols	Mayor of Boston; 1930–1934	Succeeded by Frederick Mansfield
Preceded by Joseph B. Ely	Governor of Massachusetts; 1935–1937	Succeeded by Charles F. Hurley
Preceded by John E. Kerrigan; Acting	Mayor of Boston; 1946–1950	Succeeded by John Hynes
Party political offices
Preceded by John F. Fitzgerald	Democratic nominee for Governor of Massachusetts; 1924	Succeeded by William A. Gaston
Preceded by Joseph B. Ely	Democratic nominee for Governor of Massachusetts; 1934	Succeeded by Charles F. Hurley
Preceded by Marcus A. Coolidge	Democratic nominee for U.S. Senator from Massachusetts (Class 2); 1936	Succeeded by Joseph E. Casey
Preceded by Charles F. Hurley	Democratic nominee for Governor of Massachusetts; 1938	Succeeded by Paul A. Dever
