= Maurice J. Tobin =

American politician (1901–1953)

Maurice Tobin
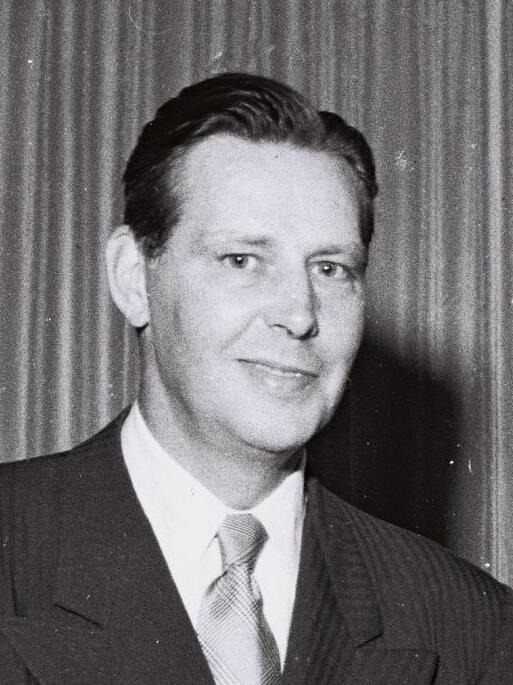
- Tobin in 1951

6th United States Secretary of Labor
- In office August 13, 1948 – January 20, 1953
- President: Harry S. Truman
- Preceded by: Lewis B. Schwellenbach
- Succeeded by: Martin Durkin

56th Governor of Massachusetts
- In office January 4, 1945 – January 2, 1947
- Lieutenant: Robert F. Bradford
- Preceded by: Leverett Saltonstall
- Succeeded by: Robert F. Bradford

46th Mayor of Boston
- In office January 3, 1938 – January 4, 1945
- Preceded by: Frederick Mansfield
- Succeeded by: John E. Kerrigan (acting)

Personal details
- Born: Maurice Joseph Tobin; May 22, 1901 Boston, Massachusetts, U.S.
- Died: July 19, 1953 (aged 52) Scituate, Massachusetts, U.S.
- Resting place: Holyhood Cemetery
- Party: Democratic
- Spouse: Helen Noonan (m. 1932)
- Children: 3
- Education: Boston College

Maurice Joseph Tobin (May 22, 1901 – July 19, 1953) was an American politician serving as 46th mayor of Boston, the 56th governor of Massachusetts and 6th United States secretary of labor. He was a member of the Democratic Party and a liberal that supported the New Deal and Fair Deal programs, and was outspoken in his support for labor unions. However, he had little success battling against the conservative majorities in the Massachusetts legislature, and the U.S. Congress.

== Early life and career ==
Tobin was born in Mission Hill, Boston, Massachusetts on May 22, 1901. Deeply rooted in the highly politicized Irish Catholic community, he was the oldest of four children of James Tobin, a carpenter, and Margaret Daly. He took evening classes at Boston College and worked for Conway Leather and New England Telephone before entering politics as a protégé of the legendary James Michael Curley. Tobin was elected to the Massachusetts House of Representatives at the age of 25 and served from 1927 to 1929.

On November 19, 1932, Tobin married Helen Noonan (1906-1987) in Brighton, Massachusetts, with whom he had three children. He served on the Boston School Committee from 1931 to 1937, before shocking the political establishment by defeating Curley in the 1937 race for Mayor of Boston.

== Mayoralty ==
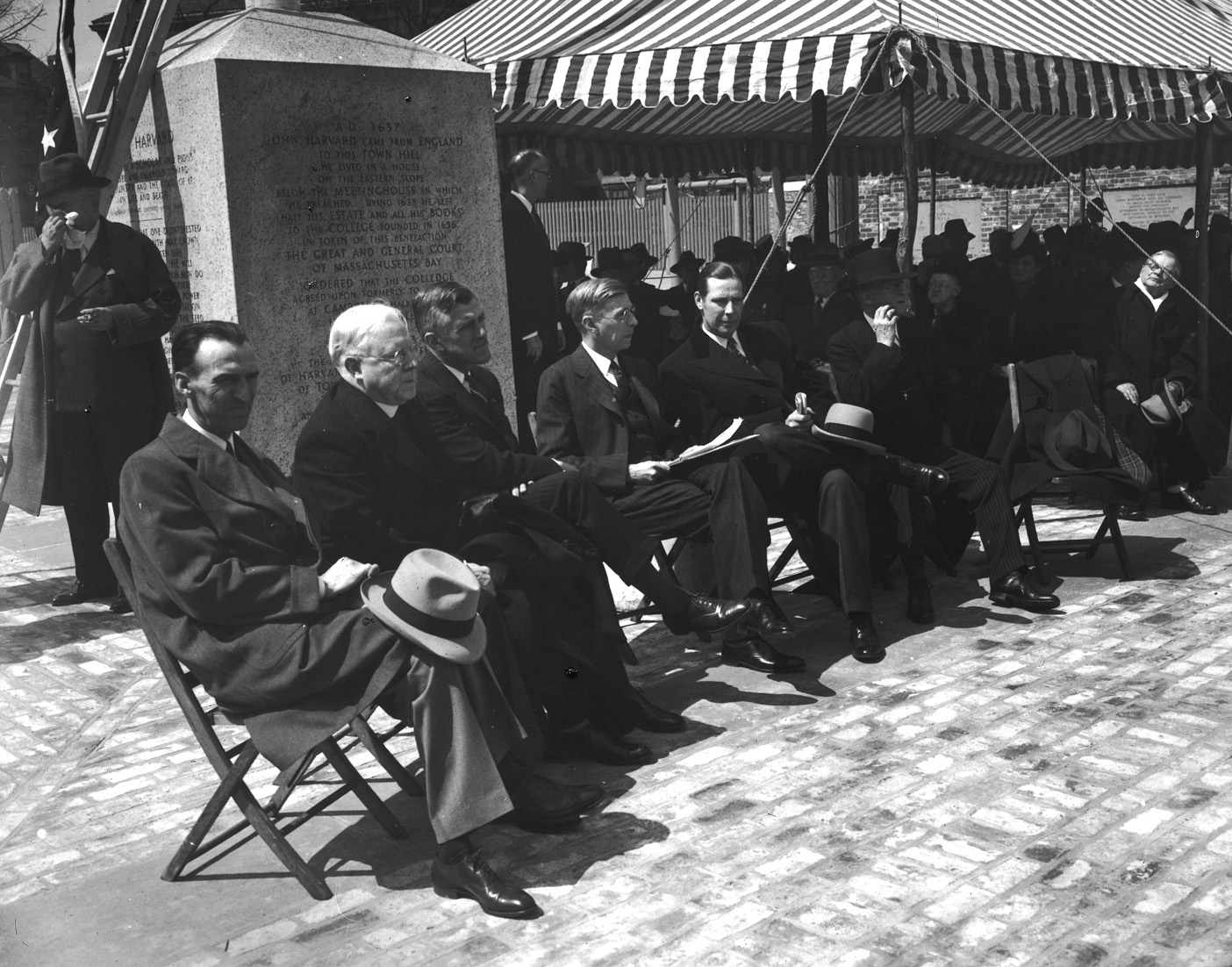
Mayor Tobin (seated, fifth from left) at the dedication of the John Harvard Mall in Charlestown on May 2, 1943.

Tobin was elected mayor of Boston in 1937. He was reelected in 1941. He served as mayor from 1938 to 1945, during which time he advocated the Fair Employment Practices Bill, which prohibited discrimination based on race, color, creed, and national origin in hiring or promotion practices. He was fiscally conservative, choosing to forgo the large public works projects that had characterized the Curley administration, and he smoothed over previously contentious battles with the federal government over access to New Deal relief funding. The Huntington Avenue subway, a WPA project begun in 1936 and one of its largest projects undertaken, was completed under his administration in 1941. In 1941, the Boston Housing Authority began clearing the land for the whites-only West Broadway Housing Development (which would open in 1949).

During his tenure as mayor, the Cocoanut Grove fire occurred in Boston. Prior to the fire, club owner Barney Welansky boasted that that club had not needed to adhere to fire codes because Tobin would not permit his club to be closed. Welansky was convicted of manslaughter, and Tobin himself only narrowly escaped indictment. Four years into Welansky's sentence, then-Governor Tobin pardoned him.

== Governorship ==
Portrait of Tobin as governor

In 1944, Mayor Tobin was elected governor of Massachusetts, defeating the Republican nominee, Lieutenant Governor Horace T. Cahill. He served one term as governor from 1945 to 1947. Tobin proposed a liberal agenda that was not accepted by the Republican-controlled Massachusetts legislature. He called for additional unemployment benefits, veterans benefits, rent control, and laws to end racial discrimination in hiring. He was a strong supporter of labor unions. In 1946, he was defeated for re-election by his Republican opponent, Lieutenant Governor Robert F. Bradford.

== Secretary of Labor ==
Governor Tobin remained active in Democratic politics, however, and campaigned vigorously for President Truman in 1948. Tobin repeatedly denounced the Taft-Hartley Act of 1947, making 150 speeches against it in the 1948 election campaign. He argued that it was bad for workers. Upon Truman's reelection, Tobin was appointed as U.S. Secretary of Labor, a position he held until the close of the Truman Administration in January 1953.

Tobin discovered that the Department of Labor had minimal influence; it did not control the National Labor Relations Board, or the Mediation Service, which were more influential. In 1949 he had president Truman transfer the United States Employment Service and the Unemployment Insurance Service to his department. He also managed to move several smaller bureaus, and he created a Federal Safety Council. Although the Democrats regained control of Congress in 1948 election, the Conservatives were still dominant and Tobin and Truman were unable to repeal Taft-Hartley.

Tobin's most notable action as Labor Secretary came in the Fair Labor Standards Amendments of 1949, which increased the minimum wage to 75 cents an hour, and strengthened the prohibitions on child labor. Tobin played a role during the Korean War in coordinating defense manpower needs. However, in the steel strike of 1952, Tobin came out on the side of the unions, saying that "the time for impartiality" had passed, and that the unions were justified in their wartime strike. In 1951, Tobin attacked Senator Joseph McCarthy, a fellow Irish Catholic, calling on fellow Catholics to repudiate McCarthy's "campaign of terror against free thought in the United States."

== Later months and death ==
Shortly after he left his position in the Truman cabinet in January 1953, Tobin died of a heart attack on July 19, 1953, at his summer home in Scituate, Massachusetts, at the age of 52. He is buried in Holyhood Cemetery in Brookline, Massachusetts. His funeral was attended by Senator John F. Kennedy.

== Legacy ==
A men's dormitory facility on the Long Island Hospital campus on Long Island in Boston Harbor is dedicated to Tobin. The Tobin Building's cornerstone was laid on November 9, 1940. In 1967, the Mystic River Bridge was renamed the Maurice J. Tobin Memorial Bridge. An elementary school is named after Tobin in the Mission Hill neighborhood of Boston, where he was born. The Psychology Department at the University of Massachusetts Amherst is located in Tobin Hall.

== See also ==
- Statue of Maurice J. Tobin
- Timeline of Boston, 1930s–1940s

== Sources ==
- Lapomarda, Vincent A. (1995). The Boston Mayor Who Became Truman's Secretary of Labor: Maurice J. Tobin and the Democratic Party. New York: Peter Lang Publishing. ISBN 0-8204-2448-X. OCLC 29522602.
- Schoenebaum, Eleonora W., ed. (1978). Political Profiles: The Truman Years. New York: Facts on File. ISBN 0871964538. OCLC 1103541081.
- Trout, Charles H. (1977). Boston: The Great Depression and the New Deal. New York: Oxford University Press. ISBN 9780195021905. OCLC 185503039.

Political offices
Preceded by Frederick Mansfield	Mayor of Boston; 1938–1945	Succeeded by John E. Kerrigan
Preceded by Leverett Saltonstall	Governor of Massachusetts; 1945–1947	Succeeded by Robert Bradford
Preceded by Lewis B. Schwellenbach	United States Secretary of Labor; 1948–1953	Succeeded by Martin Durkin
Party political offices
Preceded by Roger Putnam	Democratic nominee for Governor of Massachusetts; 1944, 1946	Succeeded by Paul A. Dever
