= James A. Gallivan =

American politician (1866–1928)

James Ambrose Gallivan
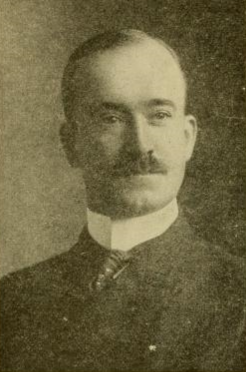

Member of the U.S. House of Representatives from Massachusetts's 12th district
- In office April 7, 1914 – April 3, 1928
- Preceded by: James Michael Curley
- Succeeded by: John William McCormack

Member of the Massachusetts State Senate 6th Suffolk District
- In office 1897–1898
- Preceded by: William H. McMorrow
- Succeeded by: John E. Baldwin

Member of the Massachusetts House of Representatives 13th Suffolk District
- In office 1895–1896

Personal details
- Born: October 22, 1866 South Boston, Massachusetts, US
- Died: April 3, 1928 (aged 61) Arlington, Massachusetts, US
- Resting place: St. Joseph Cemetery in West Roxbury, Massachusetts
- Party: Democratic
- Education: Harvard University, 1888
- Profession: Journalist

James Ambrose Gallivan (October 22, 1866 – April 3, 1928) was a United States representative from Massachusetts.

== Biography ==
Gallivan was born in Boston on October 22, 1866. He attended the public schools, graduated from the Boston Latin School in 1884 and from Harvard College in 1888. He then engaged in newspaper work.

Gallivan was a member of the Massachusetts House of Representatives in 1895 and 1896, and served in the Massachusetts State Senate from 1897 to 1898. Gallivan served as street commissioner of Boston, and was elected as a Democrat to the Sixty-third Congress to fill the vacancy caused by the resignation of James Michael Curley. Andrew Peters later defeated Gallivan and two other candidates in the December 1917 election for Mayor of Boston.

Gallivan was reelected to the Sixty-fourth and to the six succeeding Congresses and served from April 7, 1914, until his death in Arlington on April 3, 1928. His interment was in St. Joseph Cemetery in West Roxbury.

== See also ==
- List of members of the United States Congress who died in office (1900–1949)

== Footnotes ==
U.S. House of Representatives
Preceded by James Michael Curley	Member of the U.S. House of Representatives from Massachusetts's 12th congressional district April 7, 1914 – April 3, 1928	Succeeded by John W. McCormack
Political offices
Preceded by William H. McMorrow	Member of the Massachusetts State Senate; 6th Suffolk District; 1897–1898	Succeeded by John E. Baldwin
Preceded by	Member of the Massachusetts House of Representatives; 13th Suffolk District; 1895–1896	Succeeded by
