= 1917 Boston mayoral election =

Election in Massachusetts, United States

- December 18, 1917
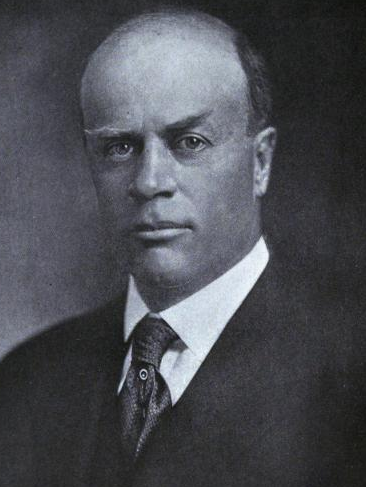

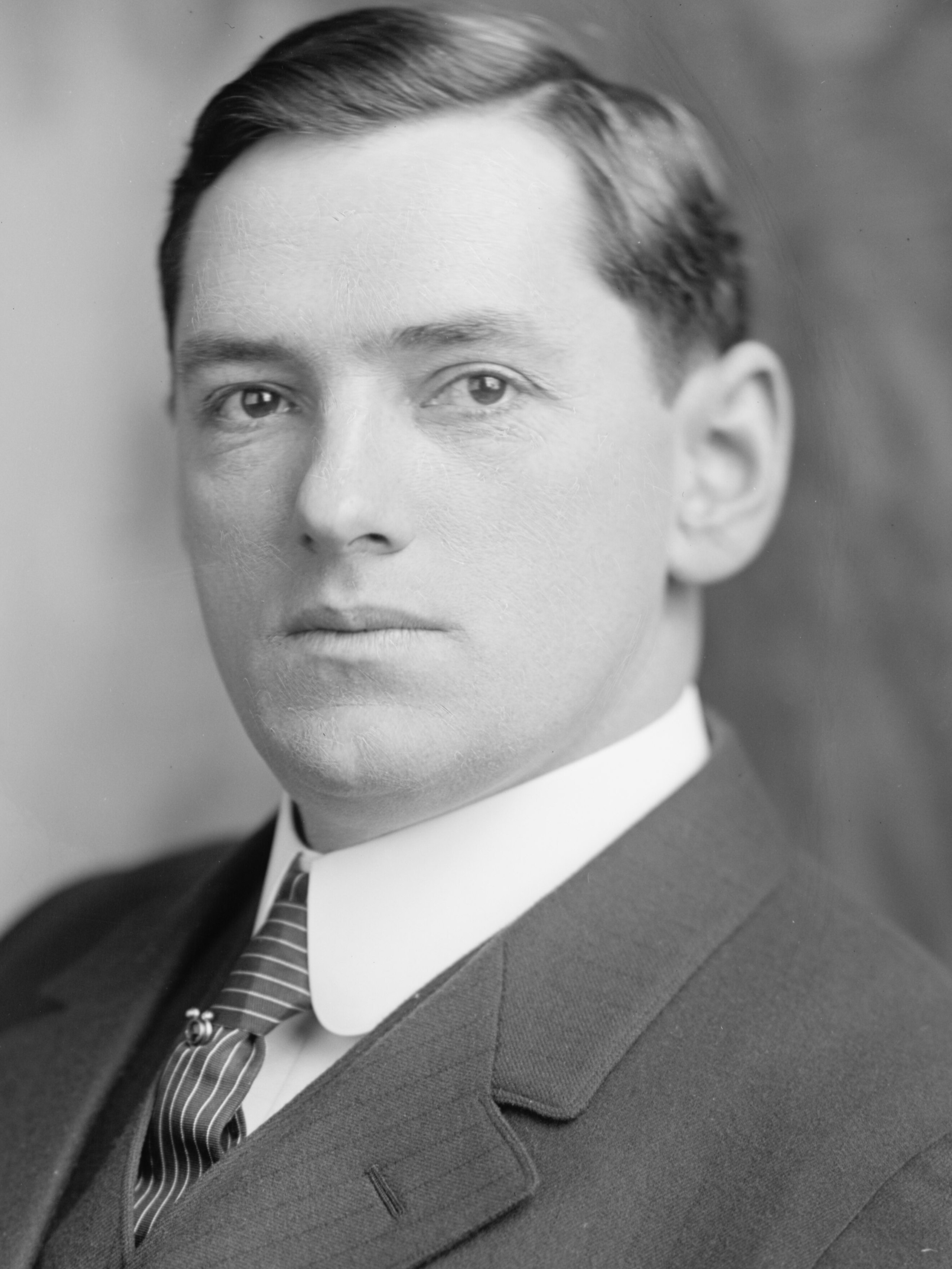

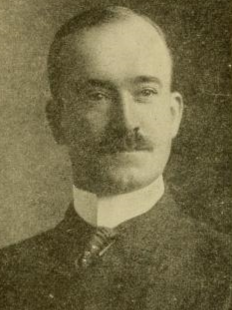
Candidate	Andrew James Peters	James Michael Curley	James A. Gallivan
Party	Nonpartisan	Nonpartisan	Nonpartisan
Popular vote	42,923	28,848	19,427
Percentage	42.9%	32.7%	22.0%
Mayor before election
James Michael Curley
Elected mayor
Andrew James Peters

The Boston mayoral election of 1917 occurred on Tuesday, December 18, 1917. Andrew James Peters, Assistant Secretary of the Treasury, defeated incumbent Mayor of Boston James Michael Curley and two other candidates.

Peters was inaugurated on Monday, February 4, 1918.

== Candidates ==
- James Michael Curley, Mayor of Boston since 1914, former member of the United States House of Representatives (1913–1914)
- James A. Gallivan, member of the United States House of Representatives since 1914, former member of the Massachusetts Senate (1897–1898) and the Massachusetts House of Representatives (1895–1896)
- Andrew James Peters, Assistant Secretary of the Treasury since 1914, former member of the United States House of Representatives (1907–1914) and the Massachusetts Senate (1904–1905)
- Peter Francis Tague, member of the United States House of Representatives since 1915, former member of the Massachusetts Senate (1899–1900) and the Massachusetts House of Representatives (1897–1898, 1913–1914)

== Results ==
Candidates	General Election	
Candidates	Votes	%
Andrew James Peters	37,923	42.9%
James Michael Curley (incumbent)	28,848	32.7%
James A. Gallivan	19,427	22.0%
Peter Francis Tague	1,751	2.0%
all others	353	0.4%

== See also ==
- List of mayors of Boston, Massachusetts
