= Andrew J. Peters =

American politician (1872–1938)

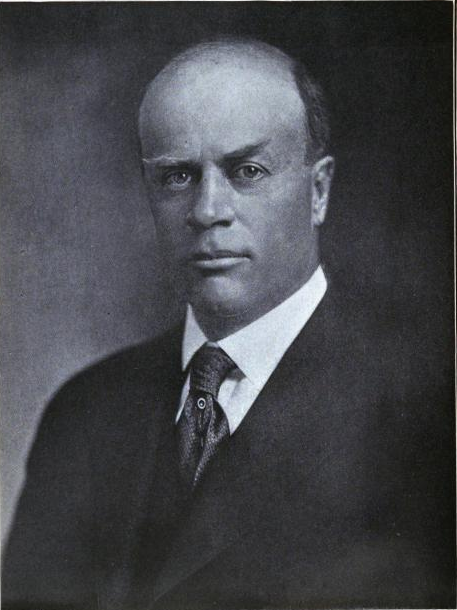
- Peters circa 1918

Mayor of Boston
- In office February 4, 1918 – February 6, 1922
- Preceded by: James Michael Curley
- Succeeded by: James Michael Curley

Member of the U.S. House of Representatives from Massachusetts's 11th district
- In office March 4, 1907 – August 15, 1914
- Preceded by: John A. Sullivan
- Succeeded by: George H. Tinkham

Member of the Massachusetts State Senate
- In office 1904–1905

Personal details
- Born: Andrew James Peters; April 3, 1872 West Roxbury, Massachusetts, U.S.
- Died: June 26, 1938 (aged 66) Jamaica Plain, Massachusetts, U.S.
- Party: Democratic
- Spouse: Martha Peters
- Education: Harvard College (A.B.); Harvard Law School (LL.B.)
- Occupation: Lawyer
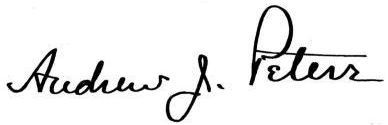
- Signature

Andrew James Peters (April 3, 1872 – June 26, 1938) was an American attorney and Democratic Party politician who was the mayor of Boston from 1918 to 1922 and represented the city in the Massachusetts Senate and United States House of Representatives. His mayoralty is best remembered for his involvement in the Boston police strike, which was resolved by Governor Calvin Coolidge. He also served as assistant secretary of the United States Treasury during the presidency of Woodrow Wilson.

After his political career, he was embroiled in scandal by the 1931 drowning death of Starr Faithfull when her diaries alleged a man named AJP had serially raped her as a young child; Peters denied the allegations through his attorney but was suspected of involvement in her drowning, leading to a series of nervous breakdowns and the end of his public career.

== Early years ==
Andrew James Peters was born in West Roxbury, Massachusetts on April 3, 1872. His family had roots in colonial Massachusetts, where the first Andrew Peters arrived in 1657. Peters graduated from Harvard University with a bachelor of arts degree in 1895 and Harvard Law School with a bachelor of laws degree in 1898.

== Political career ==
Peters served two terms in the Massachusetts State Senate (1904, 1905). In 1906, he was elected to the U.S. House of Representatives, where he served from 1907 to 1914.

In 1914, Peters was appointed to be assistant secretary of the Treasury under William Gibbs McAdoo in the first administration of President Woodrow Wilson. He served there until 1918, when he began his term as Mayor of Boston, having defeated incumbent James Michael Curley in the 1917 mayoral election. He handled the Boston police strike in 1919.

Peters was considered for Governor of Massachusetts later in the 1920s, but was not nominated. In 1928, he seconded the nomination of Al Smith for president at the Democratic National Convention. He served as treasurer of a Massachusetts state campaign against money-hoarding organized at the request of President Herbert Hoover in 1932, and was named to the Massachusetts Advisory Committee of the Home Owners' Loan Corporation in 1933.

== Child abuse and murder allegations ==
On June 8, 1931, the body of Starr Faithfull was found on Long Island, New York. An autopsy by Dr. Otto Schulz determined that Faithfull was under the influence of barbiturates and badly bruised, leading Schulz to conclude that "two men held her head under water until she was dead." Later investigations revealed Faithfull's diary, which included references to sexual relationships with 19 men, including "AJP," which Faithfull's parents alleged referred to Peters.

Peters was a cousin through marriage to Faithfull's mother, Helen Pierce, and had met the young Starr in 1916 or 1917, when she had come to Massachusetts to enroll at Rogers Hall School in Lowell. At that time, shortly before he was elected mayor, Peters allegedly dosed the eleven-year old with ether, read instructions on sex from the works of Havelock Ellis, and raped her. For the next several years, he allegedly took her on long automobile trips, stayed with her in hotels, and family vacations to North Haven, Maine. During her teenage years, Faithfull showed signs of emotional disturbance, becoming sullen and withdrawn, dressing in boys' clothes, and ultimately dropping out of Rogers Hall to move with her mother, who had remarried Stanley Faithfull, to Greenwich Village in New York City. At the age of 19, she was admitted to a Boston mental hospital, and she was later committed to Bellevue Hospital after she was found drunk, naked, and beaten in a hotel room. According to her mother, Faithfull revealed in 1924 that Peters had abused her. Beginning in 1926, Faithfull began travelling on cruise ships, visiting London, and abusing alcohol, barbiturates, and inhalants. During a trip to London, she nearly died of a sleeping medication overdose.

After Faithfull's diary was found, detailing the allegations against "AJP," reporters began to draw the association with Peters. Through a family friend and attorney, Peters denied the claims of sexual abuse. He said he had no evidence relating to her death and had not seen any member of the Faithfull family for five years. However, Stanley Faithfull produced a check for $20,000 (equivalent to approximately $371,000 in 2025) and a copy of a 1927 agreement in which the Faithfulls had agreed to hold Peters harmless and refrain from revealing the allegations against him. Although the agreement stated that Peters would make a one-time payment to the Faithfulls, the family received several large additional payments, estimating at around $80,000 ($1,483,000 in 2025), which constituted the family's only source of income and had funded Starr's travels. The New York Daily News also reported that Stanley Faithfull had gone to Peters a few days before his stepdaughter's death to ask for more money. The district attorney ordered a halt to the cremation of Faithfull's body, and authorities began to treat the case as a homicide. However, the investigation was brought to a swift end days later, when Cunard ship surgeon George Jameson Carr produced several letters from Faithfull, in which she wrote of her unrequited love for Carr and her desire to commit suicide. Stanley Faithfull maintained that his stepdaughter had been murdered. An official inquest into the cause of her death was inconclusive.

=== Aftermath ===
As a result of the case, Peters suffered several nervous breakdowns. Peters was later formally questioned by investigators in the fall of 1931 but continued to deny the abuse allegations and any involvement in Faithfull's death. He was never tried in connection with Faithfull's death or alleged child sexual abuse. Although he was publicly connected to the case, he continued to serve in offices of public trust; he was treasurer of a state campaign against money-hoarding organized at the request of President Herbert Hoover in 1932 and was named to the state advisory committee of the Home Owners' Loan Corporation in 1933.

Although the police file on the case survived, the records of district attorney Edwards and Faithfull's diaries later disappeared. In 2002, The Baltimore Sun alleged Peters had acquired the diary and locked it in the library paneling of his Boston home, where it was later found by subsequent homeowners. However, its whereabouts were unknown as of 2002.

=== True crime investigations ===
Since Peters's death, the case has been explored frequently in the true crime genre, including The Passing of Starr Faithful by Jonathan Goodman. Goodman and Russel Crouse have concluded that someone other than the Faithfull family also became aware of the abuse allegations and had attempted to make use of it in Boston, likely to extort Peters for more money.

=== In fiction ===
- The Faithfull scandal was used by John O'Hara as a basis for his 1935 novel BUtterfield 8, later adapted into an award-winning film.
- In Sandra Scoppettone's novel Some Unknown Person, a work of speculative fiction based on the case, Calvin Coolidge confronts Peters with the allegations to bring an end to the police strike.
- Peters is also a key character in Dennis Lehane's novel The Given Day.

== Personal life and death ==
Peters married Martha Phillips in 1910, and they had six children. Two of his sons, John and Alanson, died of polio in 1932. Another son, Bradford, died in a car crash in 1933.

Peters died of pneumonia in Boston on June 26, 1938.

== See also ==
- Timeline of Boston, 1900s–1920s
- 125th Massachusetts General Court (1904)
- 126th Massachusetts General Court (1905)

U.S. House of Representatives
Preceded by John A. Sullivan	Member of the U.S. House of Representatives from Massachusetts's 11th congressional district March 4, 1907 – August 15, 1914	Succeeded by George H. Tinkham
Political offices
Preceded by James Michael Curley	Mayor of Boston, Massachusetts; 1918–1922	Succeeded by James Michael Curley
