= Malcolm Nichols =

American politician (1876–1951)

Malcolm E. Nichols
- Nichols, c. 1925

Mayor of Boston
- In office January 4, 1926 – January 6, 1930
- Preceded by: James Michael Curley
- Succeeded by: James Michael Curley

Member of the Massachusetts Senate from the Fifth Suffolk District
- In office 1918–1919

Member of the Massachusetts House of Representatives from the Tenth Suffolk District
- In office 1907–1909

Member of the Boston Common Council
- In office 1905–1906

Personal details
- Born: May 8, 1876 Portland, Maine, U.S.
- Died: February 7, 1951 (aged 74) Jamaica Plain, Boston, Massachusetts, U.S.
- Resting place: Forest Hills Cemetery
- Party: Republican
- Spouse(s): Edith M. Williams; Carrie M. Williams
- Children: Clark S., Dexter, Marjorie
- Education: Harvard College

Malcolm Edwin Nichols (May 8, 1876 – February 7, 1951) was an American journalist and politician. He served as the Mayor of Boston in the late 1920s, the most recent Republican to do so.

== Early life, education, and journalism ==
Nichols was born on May 8, 1876, in Portland, Maine, the son of Edwin T. Nichols and Helen J. G. (née Pingree) Nichols. He graduated from Harvard in 1899. After graduating from Harvard he moved to East Boston and later to Ward 10 in Boston, where he began politics by unsuccessfully running for the Boston Common Council as an opponent of Charles Hiller Innes's political machine. He later forged a friendship and alliance with Innes, the who was the local ward boss.

Nichols was the Massachusetts State House reporter for The Boston Traveler, covering both houses of the legislature, and later a political reporter for The Boston Post.

== Politics ==
In addition to his newspaper work, Nichols was a lawyer and Collector of Internal Revenue. He was elected to the Boston Common Council, serving from 1905 to 1906. He was later elected a member of the Massachusetts House of Representatives representing Ward 10 of Boston from 1907 to 1909. His district represented the Back Bay. In the state house, he was a member and clerk of the House Committee on Metropolitan affairs. He served as a member of the Massachusetts Senate in 1914, and again from 1917 to 1919.

After leaving the state senate, Nichols became chairman of the Schoolhouse Commission of Boston. He was later made chairman of the city's Transit Commission. He served as the head of the city's Rent Commission amid a housing shortage, and its and Fuel Commission amid a coal labor strike.

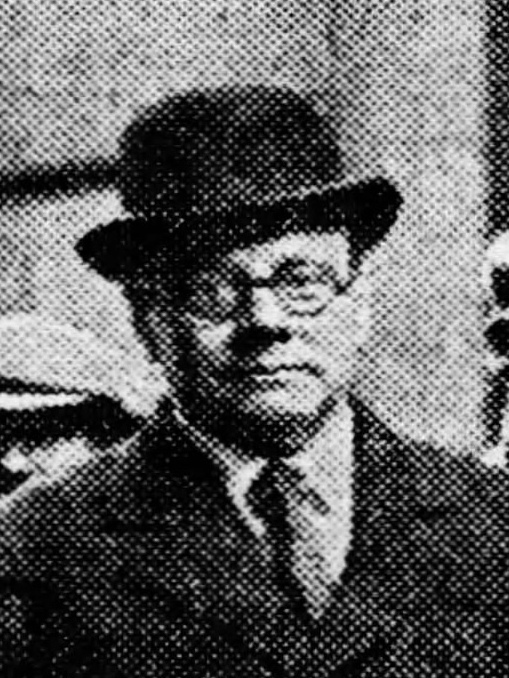
Nichols standing outside of the Boston City Hall Annex in 1925

Nichols was elected Mayor of Boston in November 1925, serving from January 4, 1926, to January 6, 1930.

Nichols' mayoralty saw the creation of two dozen new schools, 197 new streets, and the start of construction on the Sumner Tunnel. He focused on increasing Boston's municipal services, providing $3 million in raises to city workers. In 1926 he raised taxes but every year after saw cuts. He relaxed zoning restrictions in his 1928 pyramidal building statute, allowing the construction of many skyscrapers, such as the United Shoe Machinery Corporation Building, and creating a boom in their construction. He established the Boston Port Authority and Boston Traffic Commission. He attempted to combat congestion in the city by proposing a $5 to $10 annual parking fee, claiming that "four out of every five cars" parking in downtown Boston were owned by nonresidents. He also attempted to lower telephone rates.

Nichols did not seek reelection as mayor in 1929. The election was won by his predecessor James Michael Curley.

== Personal life and death ==
Nichols with his children, c. 1925

On December 16, 1915, Nichols married Edith M. Williams (died 1925). He and his first wife had three children: sons Clark and Dexter, and daughter Marjorie. His first wife died in mid-1925, and in 1926, he married Edith's twin sister, Carrie Marjorie Williams. His son Clark acted as his best man and his son Dexter acted as the ring bearer.

By the time he was elected mayor, Nichols had moved to the Jamaica Plain neighborhood of the city.

Nichols was a Swedenborgian and of English ancestry. He was a member of the Freemasons, Shriners, and Elks. Nichols died on February 7, 1951, aged 74, in Jamaica Plain, from a myocardial infarction. He was buried in Forest Hills Cemetery.

== See also ==
- 1917 Massachusetts legislature
- 1918 Massachusetts legislature
- 1919 Massachusetts legislature
- Timeline of Boston, 1900s–1920s

== Bibliography ==
- Acts and Resolves Passed by the General Court by the Secretary of the Commonwealth (1918) p. 554.
- Who's who in State Politics, 1908 Practical Politics (1908) p. 265.

Political offices
Preceded by James Michael Curley	Mayor of Boston, Massachusetts; 1926–1930	Succeeded by James Michael Curley
