= List of United States Democratic Party presidential tickets =

This is a list of electoral candidates for the offices of President of the United States and Vice President of the United States of the modern Democratic Party, either duly preselected and nominated, or the presumptive nominees of a future preselection and election. Opponents who received over one percent of the popular vote or ran an official campaign that received Electoral College votes are listed. Offices held prior to Election Day are included, and those held on Election Day have an italicized end date.

== 19th century ==
=== 1828, 1832 ===
Presidential nominee	1828 (won), 1832 (won)		Vice presidential nominee
Andrew Jackson of TN (1767–1845)	Prior public experience: U.S. House of Representatives (1796–1797); U.S. Senate (1797–1798, 1823–1825); Chair of the Senate Military Affairs Committee (1823–1825); Ranking Member of the Senate Foreign Relations Committee (1823–1824); Justice of the Tennessee Supreme Court (1798–1804); Governor of Florida (1821); President (1829–1837); Higher education: None	Prior public experience: South Carolina House of Representatives (1808–1809); U.S. House of Representatives (1811–1817); U.S. Secretary of War (1817–1825); Vice President (1825–1832); Higher education: Yale University (attended); Litchfield Law School (attended)	John C. Calhoun of SC (1782–1850) (1828)
Andrew Jackson of TN (1767–1845)	Prior public experience: U.S. House of Representatives (1796–1797); U.S. Senate (1797–1798, 1823–1825); Chair of the Senate Military Affairs Committee (1823–1825); Ranking Member of the Senate Foreign Relations Committee (1823–1824); Justice of the Tennessee Supreme Court (1798–1804); Governor of Florida (1821); President (1829–1837); Higher education: None	Prior public experience: New York Senate (1813–1820); Attorney General of New York (1815–1819); U.S. Senate (1821–1828); Chair of the Senate Judiciary Committee (1823–1828); Governor of New York (1829); U.S. Secretary of State (1829–1831); U.S. Minister to the United Kingdom (1831–1832); Higher education: None	Martin Van Buren of NY (1782–1862) (1832)
Opponent(s); John Quincy Adams (National Republican)	Electoral vote (President): Jackson: 178 (68.2%); Adams: 83 (31.8%); Electoral vote (Vice President): Calhoun: 171 (65.5%); Rush: 83 (31.8%); Smith: 7 (2.7%); Popular vote: Jackson/Calhoun: 642,553 (55.9%); Adams/Rush: 500,897 (43.7%)		Opponent(s); Richard Rush (National Republican)
Opponent(s); Henry Clay (Whig); William Wirt (Anti-Masonic)	Electoral vote (President): Jackson: 219 (76.0%); Clay: 49 (17.0%); Floyd: 11 (3.8%); Wirt: 7 (2.4%); None: 2 (0.7%); Electoral vote (Vice President): Van Buren: 189 (65.6%); Sargent: 49 (17.0%); Wilkins: 30 (10.4%); Lee: 11 (3.8%); Ellmaker: 7 (2.4%); None: 2 (0.7%); Popular vote: Jackson/Van Buren: 701,780 (54.7%); Clay/Sargent: 484,205 (36.9%); Wirt/Ellmaker: 100,715 (7.8%)		Opponent(s); John Sergeant (Whig); Amos Ellmaker (Anti-Masonic)

=== 1836, 1840 ===
Presidential nominee	1836 (won), 1840 (lost)		Vice presidential nominee
Martin Van Buren of NY (1782–1862)	Prior public experience: New York Senate (1813–1820); Attorney General of New York (1815–1819); U.S. Senate (1821–1828); Chair of the Senate Judiciary Committee (1823–1828); Governor of New York (1829); U.S. Secretary of State (1829–1831); U.S. Minister to the United Kingdom (1831–1832); Vice President (1833–1837); President (1837–1841); Higher education: None	Prior public experience: Kentucky House of Representatives (1804–1806, 1819); U.S. House of Representatives (1807–1819, 1829–1837); Chair of the House Claims Committee (1810–1811); Chair of the War Department Expenditures Committee (1817–1819); Chair of the House Post Office Committee (1829–1832); Chair of the House Military Affairs Committee (1832–1837); U.S. Senate (1819–1829); Chair of the Senate Post Office Committee (1829–1832); Vice President (1837–1841); Higher education: Transylvania University (attended)	Richard Johnson of KY (1780–1850)
Opponent(s); William Harrison (Northern Whig); Hugh White (Southern Whig)	Electoral vote (President): Van Buren: 170 (57.8%); Harrison: 73 (24.8%); White: 26 (8.8%); Webster: 14 (4.8%); Magnum: 11 (3.7%); Contingent vote (Vice President): Johnson 33 (63.5%); Granger: 16 (30.8%); Blank: 3 (5.8%); Electoral vote (Vice President): Johnson 147 (50.0%); Granger: 77 (26.2%); Tyler: 47 (16.0%); Smith: 23 (7.8%); Popular vote: Van Buren/Johnson: 764,176 (50.8%); Harrison/Granger: 550,816 (36.6%); White/Tyler: 146,109 (9.7%); Webster/Granger: 41,201 (2.7%)		Opponent(s); Francis Granger (Northern Whig); John Tyler (Southern Whig)
Opponent(s); William Harrison (Whig)	Electoral vote (President): Harrison: 234 (79.6%); Van Buren: 60 (20.4%); Electoral vote (Vice President): Tyler: 234 (79.6%); Johnson: 48 (16.3%); Tazewell: 11 (3.7%); Polk: 1 (0.3%); Popular vote: Harrison/Tyler: 1,275,390 (52.9%); Van Buren/Johnson: 1,128,854 (46.8%)		Opponent(s); John Tyler (Whig)

=== 1844 ===
Presidential nominee	1844 (won)		Vice presidential nominee
James Polk of TN (1795–1849)	Prior public experience: Tennessee House of Representatives (1823–1825); U.S. House of Representatives (1825–1839); Chair of the House Ways and Means Committee (1833–1835); Speaker of the U.S. House of Representatives (1835–1839); Governor of Tennessee (1839–1841); Higher education: University of North Carolina, Chapel Hill (BA)	Prior public experience: U.S. House of Representatives (1827–1829); Comptroller of New York (1829–1833); U.S. Senate (1833–1844); Chair of the Senate Finance Committee (1836–1841); Higher education: Middlebury College (BA)	Silas Wright of NY (1795–1847) (1844)
James Polk of TN (1795–1849)	Prior public experience: Tennessee House of Representatives (1823–1825); U.S. House of Representatives (1825–1839); Chair of the House Ways and Means Committee (1833–1835); Speaker of the U.S. House of Representatives (1835–1839); Governor of Tennessee (1839–1841); Higher education: University of North Carolina, Chapel Hill (BA)	Prior public experience: Mayor of Philadelphia, PA (1828–1829); U.S. Attorney for the Eastern District of Pennsylvania (1829–1831); Attorney General of Pennsylvania (1833–1835); U.S. Minister to Russia (1837–1839); U.S. Senate (1831–1833); Chair of the Senate Naval Affairs Committee (1832–1833); Higher education: Princeton University (BA)	George Dallas of PA (1792–1864) (1844)
Opponent(s); Henry Clay (Whig); James Birney (Liberty)	Electoral vote: Polk/Dallas: 170 (61.8%); Clay/Frelinghuysen: 105 (38.2%); Popular vote: Polk/Dallas: 1,339,494 (49.5%); Clay/Frelinghuysen: 1,300,004 (49.1%); Birney/Morris: 62,103 (2.3%)		Opponent(s); Theodore Frelinghuysen (Whig); Thomas Morris (Liberty)

=== 1848 ===
Presidential nominee	1848 (lost)		Vice presidential nominee
Lewis Cass of MI (1782–1866)	Prior public experience: Ohio House of Representatives (1806); Governor of Michigan (1813–1831); U.S. Secretary of War (1831–1836); U.S. Minister to France (1836–1842); U.S. Senate (1845–1848); Chair of the Senate Armed Services Committee (1847–1848); Higher education: None	Prior public experience: Kentucky House of Representatives (1817–1818); U.S. House of Representatives (1839–1843); Higher education: Transylvania University (BA)	William Butler of KY (1791–1880)
Opponent(s); Zachary Taylor (Whig); Martin Van Buren (Free Soil)	Electoral vote: Taylor/Fillmore: 163 (56.2%); Cass/Butler: 127 (43.8%); Popular vote: Taylor/Fillmore: 1,361,393 (47.1%); Cass/Butler: 1,223,460 (42.5%); Van Buren/Adams 291,501 (10.1%)		Opponent(s); Millard Fillmore (Whig); Charles Adams (Free Soil)

=== 1852 ===
Presidential nominee	1852 (won)		Vice presidential nominee
Franklin Pierce of NH (1804–1869)	Prior public experience: New Hampshire House of Representatives (1829–1833); Speaker of the New Hampshire House of Representatives (1831–1833); U.S. House of Representatives (1833–1837); U.S. Senate (1837–1842); Chair of the Senate Pensions Committee (1839–1841); U.S. Attorney for the District of New Hampshire (1845); Higher education: Bowdoin College (attended); Northampton Law School (attended)	Prior public experience: North Carolina House of Representatives (1807–1809); U.S. House of Representatives (1811–1816); U.S. Senate (1819–1844, 1848–1852); Chair of the Senate Public Lands Committee (1831–1832); Chair of the Senate Commerce Committee (1832–1833, 1837–1841); President pro tempore of the U.S. Senate (1836–1841, 1850–1852); Chair of the Senate Foreign Relations Committee (1849–1850); Chair of the Senate Pensions Committee (1849–1850); U.S. Minister to France (1844–1846); Higher education: University of North Carolina, Chapel Hill (BA)	William King of AL (1786–1853)
Opponent(s); Winfield Scott (Whig); John Hale (Free Soil)	Electoral vote: Pierce/King: 254 (85.8%); Scott/Graham: 42 (14.2%); Popular vote: Pierce/King: 1,607,510 (50.8%); Scott/Graham: 1,386,942 (43.9%); Hale/Julian: 155,210 (4.9%)		Opponent(s); William Graham (Whig); George Julian (Free Soil)

=== 1856 ===
Presidential nominee	1856 (won)		Vice presidential nominee
James Buchanan of PA (1791–1868)	Prior public experience: Pennsylvania House of Representatives (1814–1816); U.S. House of Representatives (1821–1831); Chair of the House Judiciary Committee (1829–1831); U.S. Minister to Russia (1832–1833); U.S. Senate (1834–1845); Chair of the Senate Foreign Relations Committee (1836–1841); Ranking Member of the Senate Foreign Relations Committee (1841–1845); U.S. Secretary of State (1845–1849); U.S. Minister to the United Kingdom (1853–1856); Higher education: Dickinson College (BA)	Prior public experience: Kentucky House of Representatives (1849–1851); U.S. House of Representatives (1851–1855); Higher education: Centre College (BA); Princeton University (attended); Transylvania University (attended)	John Breckinridge of KY (1821–1875)
Opponent(s); John Frémont (Republican); Millard Fillmore (Know Nothing)	Electoral vote: Buchanan/Breckinridge: 174 (58.8%); Frémont/Dayton: 114 (38.5%); Fillmore/Donelson: 8 (2.7%); Popular vote: Buchanan/Breckinridge: 1,836,072 (45.3%); Frémont/Dayton: 1,342,345 (33.1%); Fillmore/Donelson: 873,053 (21.5%)		Opponent(s); William Dayton (Republican); Andrew Donelson (Know Nothing)

=== 1860 ===
Presidential nominee	1860 (lost)		Vice presidential nominee
Stephen Douglas of IL (1813–1861)	Prior public experience: Illinois House of Representatives (1836–1838); Secretary of State of Illinois (1840–1841); Associate Justice of the Illinois Supreme Court (1841–1843); U.S. House of Representatives (1843–1847); Chair of the House Territories Committee (1845–1847); U.S. Senate (1847–1861); Chair of the Senate Territories Committee (1847–1858); Ranking Member of the Senate Foreign Relations Committee (1850–1851); Higher education: None	Prior public experience: U.S. Senate (1848–1849); Chair of the Senate District of Columbia Committee (1848–1849); Governor of Georgia (1853–1857); Higher education: University of Georgia (BA)	Herschel Johnson of GA (1812–1880)
Opponent(s); Abraham Lincoln (Republican); John Breckinridge (Southern Democrats); John Bell (Constitutional Union)	Electoral vote: Lincoln/Hamlin: 180 (59.4%); Breckinridge/Lane: 72 (23.8%); Bell/Everett: 39 (12.9%); Douglas/Johnson: 12 (4.0%); Popular vote: Lincoln/Hamlin: 1,865,908 (39.7%); Douglas/Johnson: 1,380,202 (29.5%); Breckinridge/Lane: 848,019 (18.2%); Bell/Everett: 590,901 (12.7%)		Opponent(s); Hannibal Hamlin (Republican); Joe Lane (Southern Democrats); Edward Everett (Constitutional Union)

=== 1864 ===
Presidential nominee	1864 (lost)		Vice presidential nominee
George McClellan of NJ (1826–1885)	Prior public experience: Commanding General of the U.S. Army (1861–1862); Higher education: University of Pennsylvania (attended); U.S. Military Academy (BS)	Prior public experience: Ohio Senate (1854–1856); U.S. House of Representatives (1857–1865); Higher education: University of Cincinnati (attended); Heidelberg University (attended)	George Pendleton of OH (1825–1889)
Opponent(s); Abraham Lincoln (National Union)	Electoral vote: Lincoln/Johnson: 212 (91.0%); McClellan/Pendleton: 21 (9.0%); Popular vote: Lincoln/Johnson: 2,218,388 (55.0%); McClellan/Pendleton: 1,812,807 (45.0%)		Opponent(s); Andrew Johnson (National Union)

=== 1868 ===
Presidential nominee	1868 (lost)		Vice presidential nominee
Horatio Seymour of NY (1810–1886)	Prior public experience: New York Assembly (1842, 1944–1845); Speaker of the New York Assembly (1845); Governor of New York (1853–1854, 1863–1864); Higher education: Hobart College (attended); Norwich University (BA)	Prior public experience: Attorney General of New Mexico (1847); Missouri House of Representatives (1852–1856); U.S. House of Representatives (1857–1859, 1860, 1861–1864); Chair of the House Armed Services Committee (1861–1862); Higher education: Yale University (attended); University of North Carolina, Chapel Hill (attended); Princeton University (BA); Transylvania University	Francis Blair of MO (1821–1875)
Opponent(s); Ulysses S. Grant (Republican)	Electoral vote: Grant/Colfax: 214 (72.8%); Seymour/Blair: 80 (27.2%); Popular vote: Grant/Colfax: 3,013,421 (52.7%); Seymour/Blair: 2,706,829 (47.3%)		Opponent(s); Schuyler Colfax (Republican)

=== 1872 ===
Presidential nominee	1872 (lost)		Vice presidential nominee
Horace Greeley of NY (1811–1872)	Prior public experience: U.S. House of Representatives (1848–1849); Higher education: None	Prior public experience: Missouri House of Representatives (1852–1858); U.S. Senate (1863–1867); Chair of the Senate Audit Committee (1865–1866); Chair of the Senate Public Grounds Committee (1866–1867); Governor of Missouri (1871–1873); Higher education: Transylvania University (attended); Yale University (BA); University of Louisville (LLB)	Benjamin Gratz Brown of MO (1826–1885)
Opponent(s); Ulysses S. Grant (Republican)	Electoral vote: Grant/Wilson: 286 (81.3%); Greeley/Brown: 66 (18.8%)*; Popular vote: Grant/Wilson: 3,598,235 (55.6%); Greely/Brown: 2,834,761 (43.8%)		Opponent(s); Henry Wilson (Republican)

=== 1876 ===
Presidential nominee	1876 (lost)		Vice presidential nominee
Samuel Tilden of NY (1814–1886)	Prior public experience: New York Assembly (1846–1847, 1872); Chair of the New York Democratic Party (1866–1874); Governor of New York (1875–1876); Higher education: Yale University (attended); New York University (attended)	Prior public experience: Indiana House of Representatives (1848–1850); U.S. House of Representatives (1851–1855); Chair of the House Mileage Committee (1851–1853); Chair of the House Invalid Pensions Committee (1853–1855); Commissioner of the General Land Office (1855–1859); U.S. Senate (1863–1869); Governor of Indiana (1873–1877); Higher education: Hanover College (BA)	Thomas Hendricks of IN (1819–1885)
Opponent(s); Rutherford Hayes (Republican)	Electoral vote: Hayes/Wheeler: 185 (50.1%); Tilden/Hendricks: 184 (49.9%); Popular vote: Tilden/Hendricks: 4,288,546 (50.9%); Hayes/Wheeler: 4,034,311 (47.9%)		Opponent(s); William Wheeler (Republican)

=== 1880 ===
Presidential nominee	1880 (lost)		Vice presidential nominee
Winfield Hancock of PA (1824–1886)	Prior public experience: Commander of the Fifth Military District (1867–1868); Higher education: U.S. Military Academy (BS)	Prior public experience: Indiana House of Representatives (1851–1853); Speaker of the Indiana House of Representatives (1852); U.S. House of Representatives (1853–1861); Chair of the House Post Office Committee (1857–1859); Higher education: Hanover College (attended)	William English of IN (1822–1896)
Opponent(s); James Garfield (Republican); James Weaver (Greenback)	Electoral vote: Garfield/Arthur: 214 (58.0%); Hancock/English: 155 (42.0%); Popular vote: Garfield/Arthur: 4,446,158 (48.3%); Hancock/English: 4,444,260 (48.2%); Weaver/Chambers: 308,649 (3.4%)		Opponent(s); Chester Arthur (Republican); Barzillai Chambers (Greenback)

=== 1884, 1888, 1892 ===
Presidential nominee	1884 (won), 1888 (lost), 1892 (won)		Vice presidential nominee
Grover Cleveland of NY (1837–1908)	Prior public experience: Mayor of Buffalo, NY (1882); Governor of New York (1883–1885); President (1885–1889); Higher education: None	Prior public experience: Indiana House of Representatives (1848–1850); U.S. House of Representatives (1851–1855); Chair of the House Mileage Committee (1851–1853); Chair of the House Invalid Pensions Committee (1853–1855); Commissioner of the General Land Office (1855–1859); U.S. Senate (1863–1869); Governor of Indiana (1873–1877); Higher education: Hanover College (BA)	Thomas Hendricks of IN (1819–1885) (1884)
Grover Cleveland of NY (1837–1908)	Prior public experience: Mayor of Buffalo, NY (1882); Governor of New York (1883–1885); President (1885–1889); Higher education: None	Prior public experience: Ohio Supreme Court (1852–1856); Associate Justice of the Ohio Supreme Court (1852–1854); Chief Justice of the Ohio Supreme Court (1854–1856); U.S. Senate (1869–1881); Chair of the Senate Private Land Claims Committee (1872–1879); President pro tempore of the U.S. Senate (1879–1880); Chair of the Senate Judiciary Committee (1879–1881); Higher education: None	Allen Thurman of OH (1813–1895) (1888)
Grover Cleveland of NY (1837–1908)	Prior public experience: Mayor of Buffalo, NY (1882); Governor of New York (1883–1885); President (1885–1889); Higher education: None	Prior public experience: U.S. House of Representatives (1875–1877, 1879–1881); Higher education: Illinois Wesleyan University (attended); Centre College (BA)	Adlai Stevenson of IL (1835–1914) (1892)
Opponent(s); James Blaine (Republican); St. John (Prohibition); Benjamin Butler (Greenback)	Electoral vote: Cleveland/Hendricks: 219 (54.6%); Blaine/Logan: 182 (45.4%); Popular vote: Cleveland/Hendricks: 4,914,482 (48.9%); Blaine/Logan: 4,856,905 (48.3%); St. John/Daniel: 147,482 (1.5%); Butler/West: 134,294 (1.3%)		Opponent(s); John Logan (Republican); William Daniel (Prohibition); Absolom West (Greenback)
Opponent(s); Benjamin Harrison (Republican); Clinton Fisk (Prohibition); Alson Streeter (Union Labor)	Electoral vote: Harrison/Morton: 233 (58.1%); Cleveland/Thurman: 168 (41.9%); Popular vote: Cleveland/Thurman: 5,534,488 (48.6%); Harrison/Morton: 5,443,892 (47.8%); Fisk/Brooks: 249,819 (2.2%); Streeter/Cunningham: 146,602 (1.3%)		Opponent(s); Levi Morton (Republican); John Brooks (Prohibition); Charles Cunningham (Union Labor)
Opponent(s); Benjamin Harrison (Republican); James Weaver (Populist); John Bidwell (Prohibition)	Electoral vote: Cleveland/Stevenson: 277 (62.4%); Harrison/Reid: 145 (32.7%); Weaver/Field: 22 (5.0%); Popular vote: Cleveland/Stevenson: 5,556,918 (46.0%); Harrison/Reid: 5,176,108 (43.0%); Weaver/Field: 1,041,028 (8.5%); Bidwell/Cranfill: 270,879 (2.2%)		Opponent(s); Whitelaw Reid (Republican); James Field (Populist); James Cranfill (Prohibition)

=== 1896, 1900 ===
Presidential nominee	1896 (lost), 1900 (lost)		Vice presidential nominee
William Jennings Bryan of NE (1860–1925)	Prior public experience: U.S. House of Representatives (1891–1895); Higher education: Illinois College (BA); Northwestern University (LLB)	Prior public experience: President of the Maine Central Railroad (1884-1893); Higher education: None	Arthur Sewall of ME (1835–1900) (1896)
William Jennings Bryan of NE (1860–1925)	Prior public experience: U.S. House of Representatives (1891–1895); Higher education: Illinois College (BA); Northwestern University (LLB)	Prior public experience: U.S. House of Representatives (1875–1877, 1879–1881); Vice President (1893–1897); Higher education: Illinois Wesleyan University (attended); Centre College (BA)	Adlai Stevenson of IL (1835–1914) (1900)
Opponent(s); William McKinley (Republican)	Electoral vote (President): McKinley: 271 (60.6%); Bryan: 176 (39.4%); Electoral vote (Vice President): Hobart: 271 (60.6%); Sewall: 149 (33.3%); Watson: 27 (6.0%); Popular vote: McKinley/Hobart: 7,102,246 (51.0%); Bryan/Sewall-Watson: 6,492,559 (46.7%)		Opponent(s); Garret Hobart (Republican); Thomas E. Watson (Populist)
Opponent(s); William McKinley (Republican); John Woolley (Prohibition)	Electoral vote: McKinley/Roosevelt: 292 (65.3%); Bryan/Stevenson: 155 (34.7%); Popular vote: McKinley/Roosevelt: 7,228,864 (51.6%); Bryan/Stevenson: 6,370,932 (45.5%); Woolley/Metcalf: 210,864 (1.5%)		Opponent(s); Theodore Roosevelt (Republican); Henry Metcalf (Prohibition)

== 20th century ==
=== 1904 ===
Presidential nominee	1904 (lost)		Vice presidential nominee
Alton Parker of NY (1852–1926)	Prior public experience: Chief Judge of the New York Court of Appeals (1898–1904); Higher education: Union University, New York (LLB)	Prior public experience: West Virginia House of Delegates (1865–1869); West Virginia Senate (1869–1871); U.S. Senate (1871–1883); Chair of the Senate Appropriations Committee (1879–1881); Higher education: None	Henry Davis of WV (1823–1916)
Opponent(s); Theodore Roosevelt (Republican); Gene Debs (Socialist); Silas Swallow (Prohibition)	Electoral vote: Roosevelt/Fairbanks: 336 (70.6%); Parker/Davis: 140 (29.4%); Popular vote: Roosevelt/Fairbanks: 7,630,457 (56.4%); Parker/Davis: 5,083,880 (37.6%); Debs/Hanford: 402,810 (3.0%); Swallow/Carroll: 259,102 (1.9%)		Opponent(s); Charles Fairbanks (Republican); Ben Hanford (Socialist); George Carroll (Prohibition)

=== 1908 ===
Presidential nominee	1908 (lost)		Vice presidential nominee
William Jennings Bryan of NE (1860–1925)	Prior public experience: U.S. House of Representatives (1891–1895); Higher education: Illinois College (BA); Northwestern University (LLB)	Prior public experience: Indiana Senate (1893–1897); Higher education: University of Michigan (LLB)	John Kern of IN (1849–1917)
Opponent(s); William Taft (Republican); Gene Debs (Socialist); Eugene Chafin (Prohibition)	Electoral vote: Taft/Sherman: 321 (66.5%); Parker/Davis: 162 (33.5%); Popular vote: Taft/Sherman: 7,678,335 (51.6%); Bryan/Kern: 6,408,979 (43.0%); Debs/Hanford: 420,852 (2.8%); Chafin/Watkins: 254,087 (1.7%)		Opponent(s); Jim Sherman (Republican); Ben Hanford (Socialist); Aaron Watkins (Prohibition)

=== 1912, 1916 ===
Presidential nominee	1912 (won), 1916 (won)		Vice presidential nominee
Woodrow Wilson of NJ (1856–1924)	Prior public experience: Governor of New Jersey (1911–1913); President (1913–1921); Higher education: Davidson College (attended); Princeton University (BA); University of Virginia; Johns Hopkins University (MA, PhD)	Prior public experience: Governor of Indiana (1909–1913); Vice President (1913–1921); Higher education: Wabash College (BA)	Thomas Marshall of IN (1854–1925)
Opponent(s); William Taft (Republican); Theodore Roosevelt (Progressive); Gene Debs (Socialist); Eugene Chafin (Prohibition)	Electoral vote: Wilson/Marshall: 435 (81.9%); Roosevelt/Johnson: 88 (16.6%); Taft/Butler: 8 (1.5%); Popular vote: Wilson/Marshall: 6,296,284 (41.8%); Roosevelt/Johnson: 4,122,721 (24.7%); Taft/Butler: 3,486,242 (23.2%); Debs/Seidel: 901,551 (6.0%); Chafin/Watkins: 208,156 (1.7%)		Opponent(s); Nicholas Butler (Republican); Hiram Johnson (Progressive); Emil Seidel (Socialist); Aaron Watkins (Prohibition)
Opponent(s); Charles Hughes (Republican); Allan Benson (Socialist); Frank Hanly (Prohibition)	Electoral vote: Wilson/Marshall: 277 (52.2%); Hughes/Fairbanks: 254 (47.8%); Popular vote: Wilson/Marshall: 9,126,868 (49.2%); Hughes/Fairbanks: 8,548,728 (46.1%); Benson/Kirkpatrick: 590,524 (3.2%); Hanly/Landrith: 221,302 (1.2%)		Opponent(s); Charles Fairbanks (Republican); Kirk Kirkpatrick (Socialist); Ira Landrith (Prohibition)

=== 1920 ===
Presidential nominee	1920 (lost)		Vice presidential nominee
James Cox of OH (1870–1957)	Prior public experience: U.S. House of Representatives (1909–1913); Governor of Ohio (1913–1915, 1917–1921); Higher education: None	Prior public experience: New York Senate (1911–1913); Assistant Secretary of the Navy (1913–1920); Higher education: Harvard University (BA); Columbia University (attended)	Franklin D. Roosevelt of NY (1882–1945)
Opponent(s); Warren G. Harding (Republican); Gene Debs (Socialist); Parley Christensen (Farmer-Labor)	Electoral vote: Harding/Coolidge: 404 (76.1%); Cox/Roosevelt: 127 (23.9%); Popular vote: Harding/Coolidge: 16,144,093 (60.3%); Cox/Roosevelt: 9,139,661 (34.2%); Debs/Stedman: 913,693 (3.4%); Christensen/Hayes: 265,398 (1.0%)		Opponent(s); Calvin Coolidge (Republican); Stedy Stedman (Socialist); Max Hayes (Farmer-Labor)

=== 1924 ===
Presidential nominee	1924 (lost)		Vice presidential nominee
John Davis of WV (1873–1955)	Prior public experience: West Virginia House of Delegates (1899); U.S. House of Representatives (1911–1913); U.S. Solicitor General (1913–1918); U.S. Ambassador to the United Kingdom (1918–1921); Higher education: Washington and Lee University (BA, LLB)	Prior public experience: Mayor of Lincoln, NE (1915–1917); Governor of Nebraska (1923–1925); Higher education: Illinois College (attended); University of Chicago (attended)	Charles Bryan of NE (1867–1945)
Opponent(s); Calvin Coolidge (Republican); Robert La Follette (Progressive)	Electoral vote: Coolidge/Dawes: 382 (71.9%); Davis/Bryan: 136 (25.6%); La Follette/Wheeler: 13 (2.4%); Popular vote: Coolidge/Dawes: 15,723,789 (54.0%); Davis/Bryan: 8,386,242 (28.8%); La Follette/Wheeler: 4,831,706 (16.6%)		Opponent(s); Charles Dawes (Republican); Burton Wheeler (Progressive)

=== 1928 ===
Presidential nominee	1928 (lost)		Vice presidential nominee
Al Smith of NY (1873–1944)	Prior public experience: New York Assembly (1904–1915); Majority Leader of the New York Assembly (1912, 1914–1915); Minority Leader of the New York Assembly (1912); Speaker of the New York Assembly (1913); New York City Council (1917–1918); President of the New York City Council (1917–1918); Governor of New York (1919–1920, 1923–1928); Higher education: None	Prior public experience: Arkansas House of Representatives (1895–1987); U.S. House of Representatives (1903–1912); Chair of the House Public Lands Committee (1911–1912); Governor of Arkansas (1913); U.S. Senate (1913–1937); Chair of the Senate Treasury Department Expenditures Committee (1913–1917); Chair of the Senate Claims Committee (1917–1919); Senate Majority Leader (1923–1933); Higher education: University of Arkansas (attended); University of Virginia (attended)	Joe Robinson of AR (1872–1937)
Opponent(s); Herbert Hoover (Republican)	Electoral vote: Hoover/Curtis: 444 (83.6%); Smith/Robinson: 87 (16.4%); Popular vote: Hoover/Curtis: 21,427,123: (58.2%); Smith/Robinson: 15,015,464 (40.8%)		Opponent(s); Charles Curtis (Republican)

=== 1932, 1936, 1940, 1944 ===
Presidential nominee	1932 (won), 1936 (won), 1940 (won), 1944 (won)		Vice presidential nominee
Franklin D. Roosevelt of NY (1882–1945)	Prior public experience: New York Senate (1911–1913); Assistant Secretary of the Navy (1913–1920); Governor of New York (1929–1932); President (1933–1945); Higher education: Harvard University (BA); Columbia University (attended)	Prior public experience: Texas House of Representatives (1898–1902); U.S. House of Representatives (1903–1933); House Minority Leader (1929–1931); Speaker of the U.S. House of Representatives (1931–1933); Vice President (1933–1941); Higher education: Vanderbilt University (attended)	Jack Garner of TX (1868–1967) (1932, 1936)
Franklin D. Roosevelt of NY (1882–1945)	Prior public experience: New York Senate (1911–1913); Assistant Secretary of the Navy (1913–1920); Governor of New York (1929–1932); President (1933–1945); Higher education: Harvard University (BA); Columbia University (attended)	Prior public experience: U.S. Secretary of Agriculture (1933–1940); Higher education: Iowa State University (BS)	Henry Wallace of IA (1888–1965) (1940)
Franklin D. Roosevelt of NY (1882–1945)	Prior public experience: New York Senate (1911–1913); Assistant Secretary of the Navy (1913–1920); Governor of New York (1929–1932); President (1933–1945); Higher education: Harvard University (BA); Columbia University (attended)	Prior public experience: Presiding Judge of Jackson County, MO (1927–1935); U.S. Senate (1935–1945); Chair of the Senate National Defense Program Committee (1941–1944); Higher education: Spalding's Commercial College (attended); University of Missouri, Kansas City (attended)	Harry S. Truman of MO (1884–1972) (1944)
Opponent(s); Herbert Hoover (Republican); Norman Thomas (Socialist)	Electoral vote: Roosevelt/Garner: 472 (88.9%); Hoover/Curtis: 59 (11.1%); Popular vote: Roosevelt/Garner: 22,821,277 (57.4%); Hoover/Curtis: 15,761,254 (39.7%); Thomas/Maurer: 884,885 (2.2%)		Opponent(s); Charles Curtis (Republican); James Maurer (Socialist)
Opponent(s); Alf Landon (Republican); William Lemke (Union)	Electoral vote: Roosevelt/Garner: 523 (98.5%); Landon/Knox: 8 (1.5%); Popular vote: Roosevelt/Garner: 27,752,648 (60.8%); Landon/Knox: 16,681,862 (36.5%); Lemke/O'Brien: 892,378 (2.0%)		Opponent(s); Frank Knox (Republican); Thomas O'Brien (Union)
Opponent(s); Wendell Willkie (Republican)	Electoral vote: Roosevelt/Wallace: 449 (84.6%); Willkie/McNary: 82 (15.4%); Popular vote: Roosevelt/Wallace 27,313,945: (54.7%); Willkie/McNary: (44.8%)		Opponent(s); Charles L. McNary (Republican)
Opponent(s); Thomas Dewey (Republican)	Electoral vote: Roosevelt/Truman: 432 (81.4%); Dewey/Bicker: 99 (18.6%); Popular vote: Roosevelt/Truman: 25,612,916 (53.4%); Dewey/Bicker: 22,017,929 (45.3%)		Opponent(s); John Bricker (Republican)

=== 1948 ===
Presidential nominee	1948 (won)		Vice presidential nominee
Harry S. Truman of MO (1884–1972)	Prior public experience: Presiding Judge of Jackson County, MO (1927–1935); U.S. Senate (1935–1945); Chair of the Senate National Defense Program Committee (1941–1944); Vice President (1945); President (1945–1953); Higher education: Spalding's Commercial College (attended); University of Missouri, Kansas City (attended)	Prior public experience: U.S. House of Representatives (1913–1927); U.S. Senate (1927–1949); Senate Majority Leader (1937–1947); Senate Minority Leader (1947–1949); Chair of the Joint Inaugural Ceremonies Committee (1948); Higher education: Marvin College (BA); Emory University (attended); University of Virginia (attended)	Alben Barkley of KY (1877–1956)
Opponent(s); Thomas Dewey (Republican); Strom Thurmond (Dixiecrat); Henry Wallace (Progressive)	Electoral vote: Truman/Barkley: 303 (57.1%); Dewey/Warren: 189 (35.6%); Thurmond/Wright: 39 (7.3%); Popular vote: Truman/Barkley: 24,179,347 (49.6%); Dewey/Warren: 21,991,292 (45.1%); Thurmond/Wright: 1,175,930 (2.4%); Wallace/Taylor: 1,157,328 (2.3%)		Opponent(s); Earl Warren (Republican); Fielding Wright (Dixiecrat); Glen Taylor (Progressive)

=== 1952, 1956 ===
Presidential nominee	1952 (lost), 1956 (lost)		Vice presidential nominee
Adlai Stevenson II of IL (1900–1965)	Prior public experience: Governor of Illinois (1949–1953); Higher education: Princeton University (BA); Northwestern University (JD)	Prior public experience: U.S. House of Representatives (1937–1946); House Majority Whip (1946); U.S. Senate (1946–1979); Chair of the Senate Small Business Committee (1955–1967); Higher education: University of Alabama (BA, LLB)	John Sparkman of AL (1899–1985) (1952)
Adlai Stevenson II of IL (1900–1965)	Prior public experience: Governor of Illinois (1949–1953); Higher education: Princeton University (BA); Northwestern University (JD)	Prior public experience: U.S. House of Representatives (1939–1949); U.S. Senate (1949–1963); Chair of the Senate Interstate Commerce Crime Committee (1950–1951); Higher education: University of Tennessee, Knoxville (BA); Yale University (LLB)	Estes Kefauver of TN (1903–1963) (1956)
Opponent(s); Dwight D. Eisenhower (Republican)	Electoral vote: Eisenhower/Nixon: 442 (83.2%); Stevenson/Sparkman: 89 (16.8%); Popular vote: Eisenhower/Nixon: 34,075,529 (55.2%); Stevenson/Sparkman: 27,375,090 (44.2%)		Opponent(s); Richard Nixon (Republican)
Opponent(s); Dwight D. Eisenhower (Republican)	Electoral vote: Eisenhower/Nixon: 457 (86.1%); Stevenson/Kefauver: 73 (13.7%); Jones/Talmadge: 1 (0.2%); Popular vote: Eisenhower/Nixon: 35,579,180 (57.4%); Stevenson/Kefauver: 26,028,028 (42.0%)		Opponent(s); Richard Nixon (Republican)

=== 1960 ===
Presidential nominee	1960 (won)		Vice presidential nominee
John F. Kennedy of MA (1917–1963)	Prior public experience: U.S. House of Representatives (1947–1953); U.S. Senate (1953–1960); Chair of the Senate Reception Room Committee (1956–1959); Higher education: Princeton University (attended); Harvard University (BA); Stanford University (attended)	Prior public experience: U.S. House of Representatives (1937–1949); U.S. Senate (1949–1961); Chair of the Senate Reception Room Committee (1955–1956); Chair of the Senate Space Committee (1958–1961); Senate Majority Whip (1951–1953); Senate Minority Leader (1953–1955); Senate Majority Leader (1955–1961); Higher education: Southwest Texas State Teachers College (BA); Georgetown University (attended)	Lyndon B. Johnson of TX (1908–1973)
Opponent(s); Richard Nixon (Republican); Harry F. Byrd (Southern; Democrats)	Electoral vote (President): Kennedy: 303 (56.4%); Nixon: 219 (40.8%); Byrd: 15 (2.8%); Electoral vote (Vice President): Johnson: 303 (56.4%); Lodge: 219 (40.8%); Thurmond: 14 (2.6%); Goldwater: 1 (0.2%); Popular vote: Kennedy/Johnson: 34,220,984 (49.7%); Nixon/Lodge: 34,108,157 (49.6%); Byrd/Thurmond: 116,248 (0.2%)		Opponent(s); Henry Cabot Lodge Jr. (Republican); Strom Thurmond (Southern; Democrats)

=== 1964 ===
Presidential nominee	1964 (won)		Vice presidential nominee
Lyndon B. Johnson of TX (1908–1973)	Prior public experience: U.S. House of Representatives (1937–1949); U.S. Senate (1949–1961); Chair of the Senate Reception Room Committee (1955–1956); Chair of the Senate Space Committee (1958–1961); Senate Majority Whip (1951–1953); Senate Minority Leader (1953–1955); Senate Majority Leader (1955–1961); Vice President (1961–1963); President (1963–1969); Higher education: Southwest Texas State Teachers College (BA); Georgetown University (attended)	Prior public experience: Mayor of Minneapolis, MN (1945–1948); U.S. Senate (1949–1964); Senate Majority Whip (1961–1964); Chair of the Senate Disarmament Committee (1955–1959); Higher education: Capitol College of Pharmacy (attended); University of Minnesota (BA); Louisiana State University (MA)	Hubert Humphrey of MN (1911–1978)
Opponent(s); Barry Goldwater (Republican)	Electoral vote: Johnson/Humphrey: 486 (90.3%); Goldwater/Miller: 52 (9.7%); Popular vote: Johnson/Humphrey: 43,127,041 (61.1%); Goldwater/Miller: 27,175,754 (38.5%)		Opponent(s); William E. Miller (Republican)

=== 1968 ===
Presidential nominee	1968 (lost)		Vice presidential nominee
Hubert Humphrey of MN (1911–1978)	Prior public experience: Mayor of Minneapolis, MN (1945–1948); U.S. Senate (1949–1964); Senate Majority Whip (1961–1964); Chair of the Senate Disarmament Committee (1955–1959); Vice President (1965–1969); Higher education: Capitol College of Pharmacy (attended); University of Minnesota (BA); Louisiana State University (MA)	Prior public experience: Maine House of Representatives (1947–1951); Minority Leader of the Maine House of Representatives (1949–1951); Governor of Maine (1955–1959); U.S. Senate (1959–1980); Chair of the Democratic Senatorial Campaign Committee (1967–1969); Higher education: Bates College (BA); Cornell University (LLB)	Edmund Muskie of ME (1914–1996)
Opponent(s); Richard Nixon (Republican); George Wallace (American; Independent)	Electoral vote: Nixon/Agnew: 301 (55.9%); Humphrey/Muskie: 191 (35.5%); Wallace/LeMay: 46 (8.6%); Popular vote: Nixon/Agnew: 31,783,783 (43.4%); Humphrey/Muskie: 31,271,839 (42.7%); Wallace/LeMay: 9,901,118 (13.5%)		Opponent(s); Spiro Agnew (Republican); Curtis LeMay (American; Independent)

=== 1972 ===
Presidential nominee	1972 (lost)		Vice presidential nominee
George McGovern of SD (1922–2012)	Prior public experience: U.S. House of Representatives (1957–1961); Director of Food for Peace (1961–1962); U.S. Senate (1963–1981); Chair of the Senate Nutrition Committee (1968–1977); Higher education: Dakota Wesleyan University (BA); Garrett-Evangelical Theological Seminary (attended); Northwestern University (MA, PhD)	Prior public experience: Attorney General of Missouri (1961–1965); Lieutenant Governor of Missouri (1965–1968); U.S. Senate (1968–1987); Chair of the Senate District of Columbia Committee (1971–1977); Higher education: Amherst College (BA); University of Oxford (attended); Harvard University (LLB)	Tom Eagleton of MO (1929–2007) (1972)
George McGovern of SD (1922–2012)	Prior public experience: U.S. House of Representatives (1957–1961); Director of Food for Peace (1961–1962); U.S. Senate (1963–1981); Chair of the Senate Nutrition Committee (1968–1977); Higher education: Dakota Wesleyan University (BA); Garrett-Evangelical Theological Seminary (attended); Northwestern University (MA, PhD)	Prior public experience: Director of the Peace Corps (1961–1966); Director of the Office of Economic Opportunity (1964–1968); U.S. Ambassador to France (1968–1970); Higher education: Yale University (BA, LLB)	Sargent Shriver of MD (1915–2011) (1972)
Opponent(s); Richard Nixon (Republican); John G. Schmitz (American; Independent)	Electoral vote: Nixon/Agnew: 520 (96.7%); McGovern/Shriver: 17 (3.2%); Hospers/Nathan: 1 (0.2%); Popular vote: Nixon/Agnew: 47,168,710 (60.6%); McGovern/Shriver 29,173,222 (37.5%); Schmitz/Anderson: 1,100,868 (1.4%)		Opponent(s); Spiro Agnew (Republican); Thomas J. Anderson (American; Independent)

=== 1976, 1980 ===
Presidential nominee	1976 (won), 1980 (lost)		Vice presidential nominee
Jimmy Carter of GA (1924–2024)	Prior public experience: Georgia Senate (1963–1967); Governor of Georgia (1971–1975); President (1977–1981); Higher education: Georgia Southwestern State University (attended); Georgia Institute of Technology (attended); United States Naval Academy (BS)	Prior public experience: Attorney General of Minnesota (1960–1964); U.S. Senate (1964–1976); Chair of the Senate Equal Education Opportunity Committee (1969–1973); Vice President (1977–1981); Higher education: Macalester College (attended); University of Minnesota (BA, JD)	Walter Mondale of MN (1928–2021)
Opponent(s); Gerald Ford (Republican)	Electoral vote (President): Carter: 297 (55.2%); Ford: 240 (44.6%); Reagan: 1 (0.2%); Electoral vote (Vice President): Mondale: 297 (55.2%); Dole: 241 (44.8%); Popular vote: Carter/Mondale: 40,831,881 (50.1%); Ford/Dole: 39,148,634 (48.0%)		Opponent(s); Bob Dole (Republican)
Opponent(s); Ronald Reagan (Republican); John B. Anderson (Independent); Ed Clark (Libertarian)	Electoral vote: Reagan/Bush: 489 (90.9%); Carter/Mondale: 49 (9.1%); Popular vote: Reagan/Bush: 43,903,230 (50.8%); Carter/Mondale: 35,480,115 (41.0%); Anderson/Lucey: 5,719,850 (6.6%); Clark/Koch: 921,128 (1.1%)		Opponent(s); George H. W. Bush (Republican); Patrick Lucey (Independent); David Koch (Libertarian)

=== 1984 ===
Presidential nominee	1984 (lost)		Vice presidential nominee
Walter Mondale of MN (1928–2021)	Prior public experience: Attorney General of Minnesota (1960–1964); U.S. Senate (1964–1976); Chair of the Senate Equal Education Opportunity Committee (1969–1973); Vice President (1977–1981); Higher education: Macalester College (attended); University of Minnesota (BA, JD)	Prior public experience: U.S. House of Representatives (1979–1985); Secretary of the House Democratic Caucus (1981–1985); Higher education: Marymount Manhattan College (BA); Fordham University (JD)	Geraldine Ferraro of NY (1935–2011)
Opponent(s); Ronald Reagan (Republican)	Electoral vote: Reagan/Bush: 525 (97.6%); Mondale/Ferraro: 13 (2.4%); Popular vote: Reagan/Bush: 54,455,472 (58.8%); Mondale/Ferraro: 37,577,352 (40.6%)		Opponent(s); George H. W. Bush (Republican)

=== 1988 ===
Presidential nominee	1988 (lost)		Vice presidential nominee
Michael Dukakis of MA (born 1933)	Prior public experience: Massachusetts House of Representatives (1965–1971); Governor of Massachusetts (1975–1979, 1983–1991); Chair of the Democratic Governors Association (1986–1987); Higher education: Swarthmore College (BA); Harvard University (JD)	Prior public experience: U.S. House of Representatives (1948–1955); U.S. Senate (1971–1993); Chair of the Democratic Senatorial Campaign Committee (1973–1976); Chair of the Democratic Senatorial Campaign Committee (1983–1985); Chair of the Joint Economic Committee (1983–1985); Chair of the Senate Finance Committee (1987–1993); Higher education: University of Texas, Austin (LLB)	Lloyd Bentsen of TX (1921–2006)
Opponent(s); George H. W. Bush (Republican)	Electoral vote (President): Bush: 426 (79.2%); Dukakis: 111 (20.6%); Bentsen: 1 (0.2%); Electoral vote (Vice President): Quayle: 426 (79.2%); Bentsen: 111 (20.6%); Dukakis: 1 (0.2%); Popular vote: Bush/Quayle: 48,886,097 (53.4%); Dukakis/Bentsen: 41,809,074 (45.7%)		Opponent(s); Dan Quayle (Republican)

=== 1992, 1996 ===
Presidential nominee	1992 (won), 1996 (won)		Vice presidential nominee
Bill Clinton of AR (born 1946)	Prior public experience: Attorney General of Arkansas (1977–1979); Governor of Arkansas (1979–1981, 1983–1992); Chair of the National Governors Association (1986–1987); Chair of the Democratic Governors Association (1987–1988); President (1993–2001); Higher education: Georgetown University (BS); University College, Oxford (attended); Yale University (JD)	Prior public experience: U.S. House of Representatives (1977–1985); U.S. Senate (1985–1993); Vice President (1993–2001); Higher education: Harvard University (BA); Vanderbilt University (attended)	Al Gore of TN (born 1948)
Opponent(s); George H. W. Bush (Republican); Ross Perot (Independent)	Electoral vote: Clinton/Gore: 370 (68.8%); Bush/Quayle: 168 (31.2%); Popular vote: Clinton/Gore: 44,909,806 (43.0%); Bush/Quayle: 39,104,550 (37.5%); Perot/Stockdale: 19,743,821 (18.9%)		Opponent(s); Dan Quayle (Republican); James Stockdale (Independent)
Opponent(s); Bob Dole (Republican); Ross Perot (Reform)	Electoral vote: Clinton/Gore: 379 (70.4%); Dole/Kemp: 159 (29.6%); Popular vote: Clinton/Gore: 47,401,185 (49.2%); Dole/Kemp: 39,197,469 (40.7%); Perot/Choate: 8,085,294 (8.4%)		Opponent(s); Jack Kemp (Republican); Pat Choate (Reform)

== 21st century ==
=== 2000 ===
Presidential nominee	2000 (lost)		Vice presidential nominee
Al Gore of TN (born 1948)	Prior public experience: U.S. House of Representatives (1977–1985); U.S. Senate (1985–1993); Vice President (1993–2001); Higher education: Harvard University (BA); Vanderbilt University (attended)	Prior public experience: Connecticut Senate (1971–1981); Majority Leader of the Connecticut Senate (1975–1981); Attorney General of Connecticut (1983–1989); U.S. Senate (1989–2013); Higher education: Yale University (BA, LLB)	Joe Lieberman of CT (1942–2024)
Opponent(s); George W. Bush (Republican); Ralph Nader (Green)	Electoral vote: Bush/Cheney: 271 (50.4%); Gore/Lieberman: 266 (49.4%); Popular vote: Gore/Lieberman: 50,999,897 (48.4%); Bush/Cheney: 50,456,002 (47.9%); Nader/LaDuke: 2,882,955 (2.7%)		Opponent(s); Dick Cheney (Republican); Winona LaDuke (Green)

=== 2004 ===
Presidential nominee	2004 (lost)		Vice presidential nominee
John Kerry of MA (born 1943)	Prior public experience: Lieutenant Governor of Massachusetts (1983–1985); U.S. Senate (1985–2013); Chair of the Democratic Senatorial Campaign Committee (1987–1989); Chair of the Senate Democratic Steering Committee (1995–2003); Chair of the Senate POW/MIA Affairs Committee (1991–1993); Ranking Member of the Senate Small Business Committee (1997–2001, 2003–2007); Chair of the Senate Small Business Committee (2001–2003); Higher education: Yale University (BA); Boston College (JD)	Prior public experience: U.S. Senate (1999–2005); Higher education: Clemson University (attended); North Carolina State University (BA); University of North Carolina, Chapel Hill (JD)	John Edwards of NC (born 1953)
Opponent(s); George W. Bush (Republican)	Electoral vote (President): Bush: 286 (53.2%); Kerry: 251 (46.7%); Edwards: 1 (0.2%); Electoral vote (Vice President): Cheney: 286 (53.2%); Edwards: 252 (46.8%); Popular vote: Bush/Cheney: 62,040,610 (50.7%); Kerry/Edwards: 59,028,444 (48.3%)		Opponent(s); Dick Cheney (Republican)

=== 2008, 2012 ===
Presidential nominee	2008 (won), 2012 (won)		Vice presidential nominee
Barack Obama of IL (born 1961)	Prior public experience: Illinois Senate (1997–2004); U.S. Senate (2005–2008); President (2009–2017); Higher education: Occidental College (attended); Columbia University (BA); Harvard University (JD)	Prior public experience: U.S. Senate (1973–2009); Ranking Member of the Senate Judiciary Committee (1981–1987, 1995–1997); Ranking Member of the Senate Narcotics Caucus (1985–1987, 1995–2001, 2003–2007); Chair of the Senate Judiciary Committee (1987–1995); Chair of the Senate Narcotics Caucus (1987–1995, 2001–2003, 2007–2009); Ranking Member of the Senate Foreign Relations Committee (1997–2001, 2003–2007); Chair of the Senate Foreign Relations Committee (2001–2003, 2007–2009); Vice President (2009–2017); Higher education: University of Delaware (BA); Syracuse University (JD)	Joe Biden of DE (born 1942)
Opponent(s); John McCain (Republican)	Electoral vote: Obama/Biden: 365 (67.8%); McCain/Palin: 173 (32.2%); Popular vote: Obama/Biden: 69,498,516 (52.9%); McCain/Palin: 59,948,323 (45.7%)		Opponent(s); Sarah Palin (Republican)
Opponent(s); Mitt Romney (Republican)	Electoral vote: Obama/Biden: 332 (61.7%); Romney/Ryan: 206 (38.3%); Popular vote: Obama/Biden: 65,915,795 (51.1%); Romney/Ryan: 60,933,504 (47.2%); Johnson/Gray: 1,275,971 (1.0%)		Opponent(s); Paul Ryan (Republican)

=== 2016 ===
Presidential nominee	2016 (lost)		Vice presidential nominee
Hillary Clinton of NY (born 1947)	Prior public experience: Chair of the Legal Services Corporation (1978–1980); First Lady of Arkansas (1979–1981, 1983–1992); First Lady of the United States (1993–2001); U.S. Senate (2001–2009); Chair of the Senate Democratic Steering Committee (2003–2007); U.S. Secretary of State (2009–2013); Higher education: Wellesley College (BA); Yale University (JD)	Prior public experience: Mayor of Richmond, VA (1998–2001); Lieutenant Governor of Virginia (2002–2006); Governor of Virginia (2006–2010); Chair of the Democratic National Committee (2009–2011); U.S. Senate (2013–present); Higher education: University of Missouri (BA); Harvard University (JD)	Tim Kaine of VA (born 1958)
Opponent(s); Donald Trump (Republican); Gary Johnson (Libertarian); Jill Stein (Green)	Electoral vote (President): Trump: 304 (56.5%); Clinton: 227 (42.2%); Powell: 3 (0.6%); Kasich: 1 (0.2%); Paul: 1 (0.2%); Sanders: 1 (0.2%); Spotted Eagle: 1 (0.2%); Electoral vote (Vice President): Pence: 305 (56.7%); Kaine: 227 (42.2%); Warren: 2 (0.4%); Cantwell: 1 (0.2%); Collins: 1 (0.2%); Fiorina: 1 (0.2%); LaDuke: 1 (0.2%); Popular vote: Clinton/Kaine: 65,853,514 (48.2%); Trump/Pence: 62,984,828 (46.1%); Johnson/Weld: 4,489,341 (3.3%); Stein/Baraka: 1,457,218 (1.1%)		Opponent(s); Mike Pence (Republican); Bill Weld (Libertarian); Ajamu Baraka (Green)

=== 2020 ===
Presidential nominee	2020 (won)		Vice presidential nominee
Joe Biden of DE (born 1942)	Prior public experience: U.S. Senate (1973–2009); Ranking Member of the Senate Judiciary Committee (1981–1987, 1995–1997); Ranking Member of the Senate Narcotics Caucus (1985–1987, 1995–2001, 2003–2007); Chair of the Senate Judiciary Committee (1987–1995); Chair of the Senate Narcotics Caucus (1987–1995, 2001–2003, 2007–2009); Ranking Member of the Senate Foreign Relations Committee (1997–2001, 2003–2007); Chair of the Senate Foreign Relations Committee (2001–2003, 2007–2009); Vice President (2009–2017); Higher education: University of Delaware (BA); Syracuse University (JD)	Prior public experience: District Attorney of San Francisco, CA (2004–2011); Attorney General of California (2011–2017); U.S. Senate (2017–2021); Higher education: Howard University (BA); University of California, Hastings (JD)	Kamala Harris of CA (born 1964)
Opponent(s); Donald Trump (Republican); Jo Jorgensen (Libertarian)	Electoral vote: Biden/Harris: 306 (56.9%); Trump/Pence: 232 (43.1%); Popular vote: Biden/Harris: 81,283,501 (51.3%); Trump/Pence: 74,223,975 (46.9%); Jorgensen/Cohen: 1,865,535 (1.2%)		Opponent(s); Mike Pence (Republican); Spike Cohen (Libertarian)

=== 2024 ===
Presidential nominee	2024 (lost)		Vice presidential nominee
Kamala Harris of CA (born 1964)	Prior public experience: District Attorney of San Francisco, CA (2004–2011); Attorney General of California (2011–2017); U.S. Senate (2017–2021); Vice President (2021–2025); Higher education: Howard University (BA); University of California, Hastings (JD)	Prior public experience: U.S. House of Representatives (2007–2019); Ranking Member of the House Veterans' Affairs Committee (2017–2019); Governor of Minnesota (2019–present); Chair of the Democratic Governors Association (2023–2024); Higher education: University of Houston (attended); Chadron State College (BS); Minnesota State University, Mankato (MS); Saint Mary's University of Minnesota (attended)	Tim Walz of MN (born 1964)
Opponent(s); Donald Trump (Republican)	Electoral vote: Trump/Vance: 312 (58.0%); Harris/Walz: 226 (42.0%); Popular vote: Trump/Vance: 77,302,580 (49.8%); Harris/Walz: 75,017,613 (48.3%)		Opponent(s); JD Vance (Republican)

== See also ==
Democratic Party

- Democratic National Convention
- Factions in the Democratic Party (United States)
- History of the Democratic Party (United States)
- List of Democratic National Conventions
- Political positions of the Democratic Party (United States)

United States politics

- List of United States National Republican and Whig Party presidential tickets
- List of United States Republican Party presidential tickets
- List of United States Green Party presidential tickets
- List of United States Libertarian Party presidential tickets
- List of Federalist Party presidential tickets
- List of Democratic-Republican Party presidential tickets
- List of United States major third party and independent presidential tickets
