= Daniel Coakley =

Daniel Coakley may refer to:

- Daniel Coakley (swimmer) (born 1989), Filipino-American swimmer
- Daniel H. Coakley (1865–1952), American political figure and lawyer
- Daniel H. Coakley Jr. (1906–1964), American politician
