= 1919 Massachusetts gubernatorial election =

- November 4, 1919
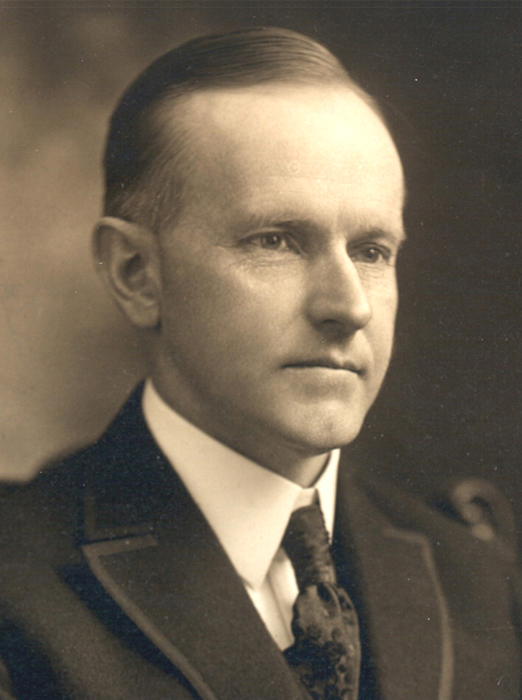

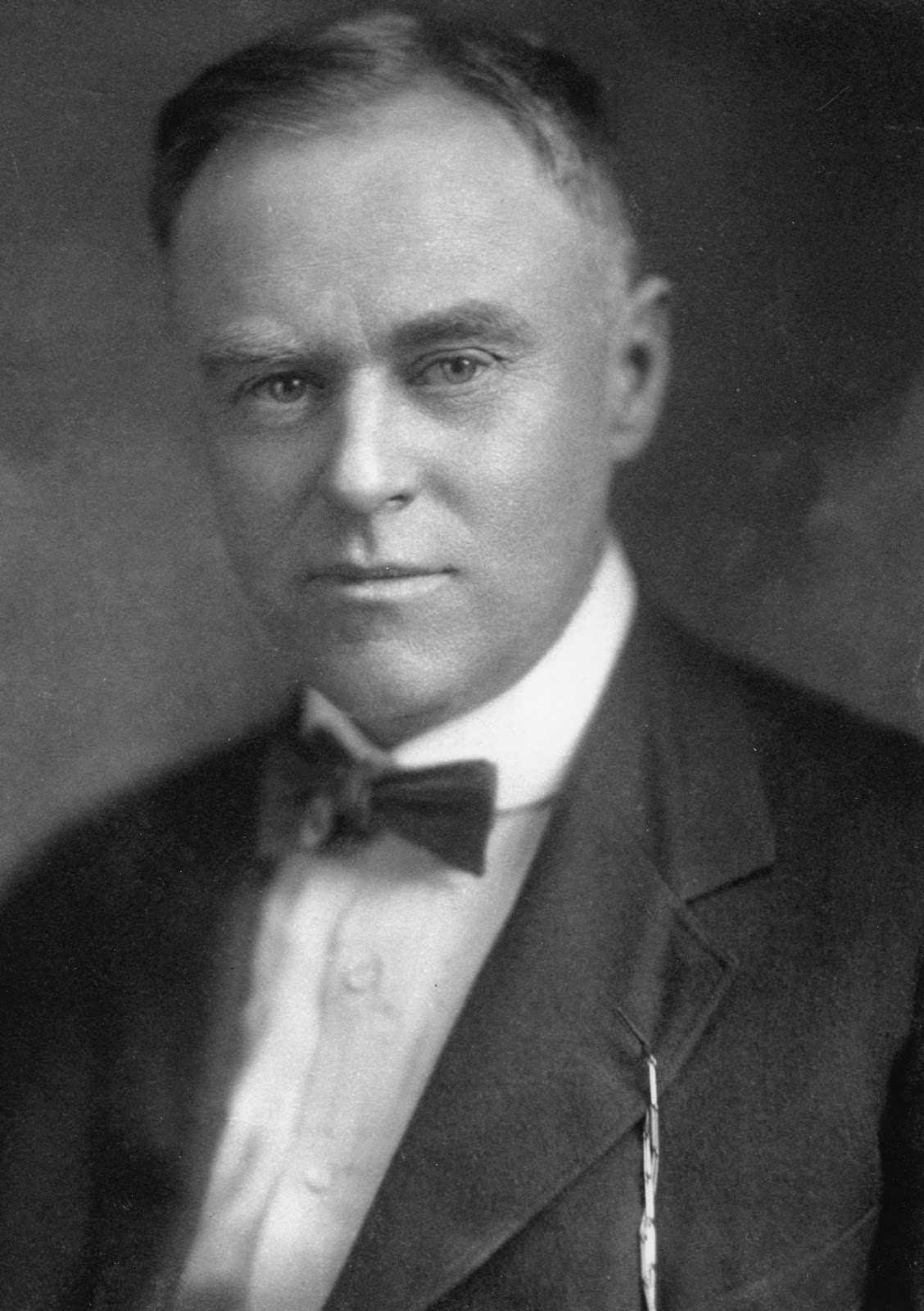
Nominee	Calvin Coolidge	Richard H. Long
Party	Republican	Democratic
Popular vote	317,774	192,673
Percentage	60.94%	36.95%
- Coolidge: 40–50% 50–60% 60–70% 70–80% 80–90% >90% Long: 40–50% 50–60% 60–70%
Governor before election
Calvin Coolidge
Republican
Elected Governor
Calvin Coolidge
Republican

The 1919 Massachusetts gubernatorial election was held on November 4, 1919. This was the last gubernatorial election before the governor's term was extended to two years and the first election following the passage of the Nineteenth Amendment to the United States Constitution, which granted women the right to vote.

Governor Calvin Coolidge was re-elected over Framingham businessman Richard Long in a landslide. This was a rematch of the previous year's contest. Coolidge would be elected vice president of the United States in 1920 and succeed President Warren Harding upon Harding's death.

== Republican primary ==
=== Governor ===
==== Candidates ====
- Calvin Coolidge, incumbent governor

Governor Coolidge was unopposed for re-nomination.

==== Results ====
Republican gubernatorial primary, 1919
Party	Candidate	Votes	%
Republican	Calvin Coolidge (incumbent)	129,145	99.98%
Write-in	All others	24	0.02%
Total votes		129,169	100.00%

=== Lt. governor ===
==== Candidates ====
- Channing H. Cox, incumbent lieutenant governor

Lieutenant Governor Cox was unopposed for the re-nomination.

==== Results ====
Republican gubernatorial primary, 1919
Party	Candidate	Votes	%
Republican	Channing H. Cox	126,805	100.00%
Write-in	All others	5	0.00%
Total votes		126,810	100.00%

== Democratic primary ==
=== Governor ===
==== Candidates ====
- Frederick Simpson Deitrick, former U.S. representative
- Eugene Foss, former governor
- Richard H. Long, nominee for governor in 1918
- George F. Monahan, former state senator

==== Results ====
Democratic gubernatorial primary, 1919
Party	Candidate	Votes	%
Democratic	Richard H. Long	53,970	68.06%
Democratic	Eugene Foss	11,118	14.02%
Democratic	George F. Monahan	9,771	12.32%
Democratic	Frederick S. Deitrick	4,438	5.60%
Write-in	All others	10	0.01%
Total votes		79,297	100.00%

=== Lt. governor ===
==== Candidates ====
- John F. J. Herbert, World War I veteran and former managing editor of the Worcester Evening Post

Herbert was unopposed for the Democratic nomination.

Democratic gubernatorial primary, 1919
Party	Candidate	Votes	%
Democratic	John F. J. Herbert	60,538	99.99%
Write-in	All others	5	0.01%
Total votes		60,543	100.00%

== General election ==
=== Results ===
Massachusetts gubernatorial election, 1919
Party	Candidate	Votes	%	±%
Republican	Calvin Coolidge (incumbent)	317,774	60.94%	▲10.07
Democratic	Richard H. Long	192,673	36.95%	▼9.89
Socialist	William A. King	7,041	1.35%	▼0.49
Socialist Labor	Ingvar Paulsen	2,321	0.45%	Steady
Prohibition	Charles B. Ernst	1,679	0.32%	N/A
Write-in	All others	9	0.00%	Steady

== See also ==
- 1919 Massachusetts legislature

== Bibliography ==
- Office of the Secretary of the Commonwealth (1920). Election Statistics, 1919. Boston, MA.
