= 1925 Boston mayoral election =

Election in Massachusetts, United States

- November 3, 1925

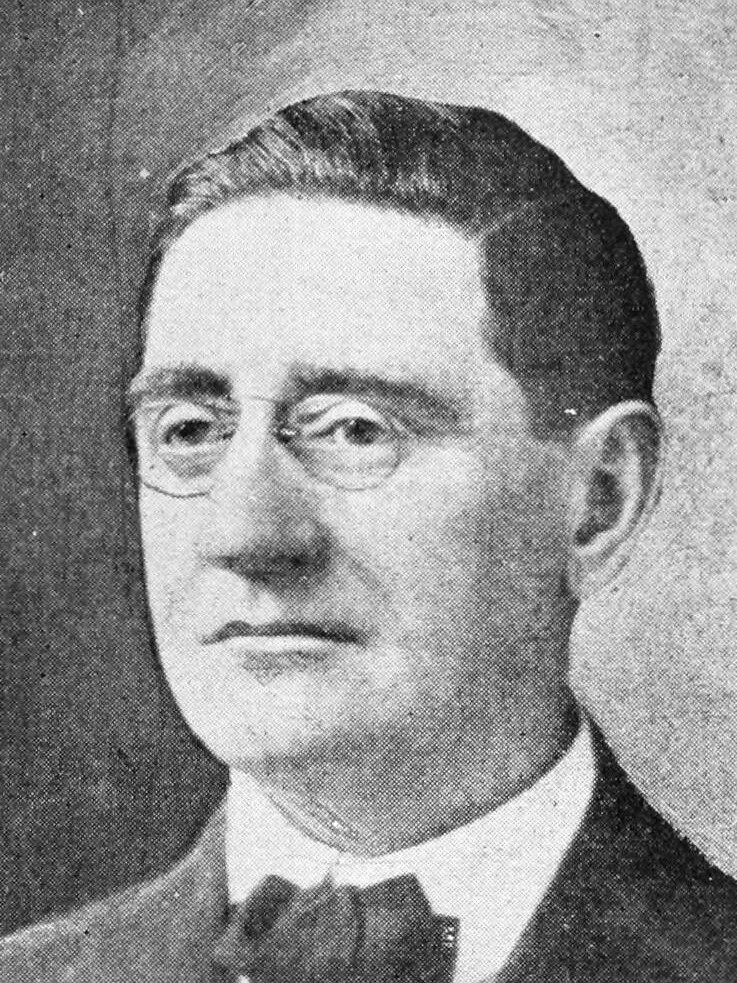

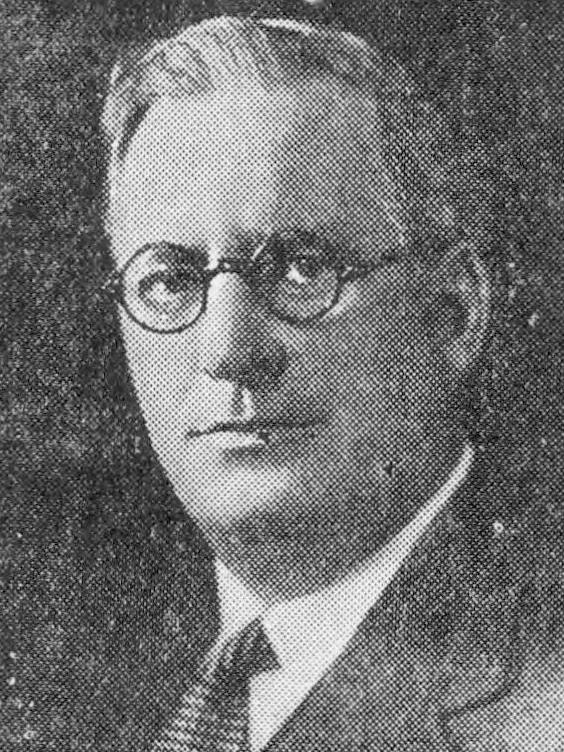
Candidate	Malcolm Nichols	Theodore A. Glynn	Joseph H. O'Neil
Party	Nonpartisan	Nonpartisan	Nonpartisan
Popular vote	64,492	42,687	31,888
Percentage	35.4%	23.4%	17.5%
Candidate	Daniel H. Coakley	Thomas C. O'Brien
Party	Nonpartisan	Nonpartisan
Popular vote	20,144	9,443
Percentage	11.1%	5.2%
Mayor before election
James Michael Curley
Elected mayor
Malcolm Nichols

The Boston mayoral election of 1925 occurred on Tuesday, November 3, 1925. Malcolm Nichols, a former member of the Massachusetts House of Representatives and Massachusetts Senate, defeated nine other candidates to be elected mayor.

Many votes were split between three Democratic candidates (Glynn, O'Neil, Coakley), which was a factor in the election of Nichols, a Republican. While municipal elections in Boston have been nonpartisan since 1910, Nichols is the most recent Republican to be elected Mayor of Boston as of 2026.

In 1918, the Massachusetts state legislature had passed legislation making the Mayor of Boston ineligible to serve consecutive terms. Thus, incumbent James Michael Curley was unable to run for re-election.

Nichols was inaugurated on Monday, January 4, 1926.

== Candidates ==
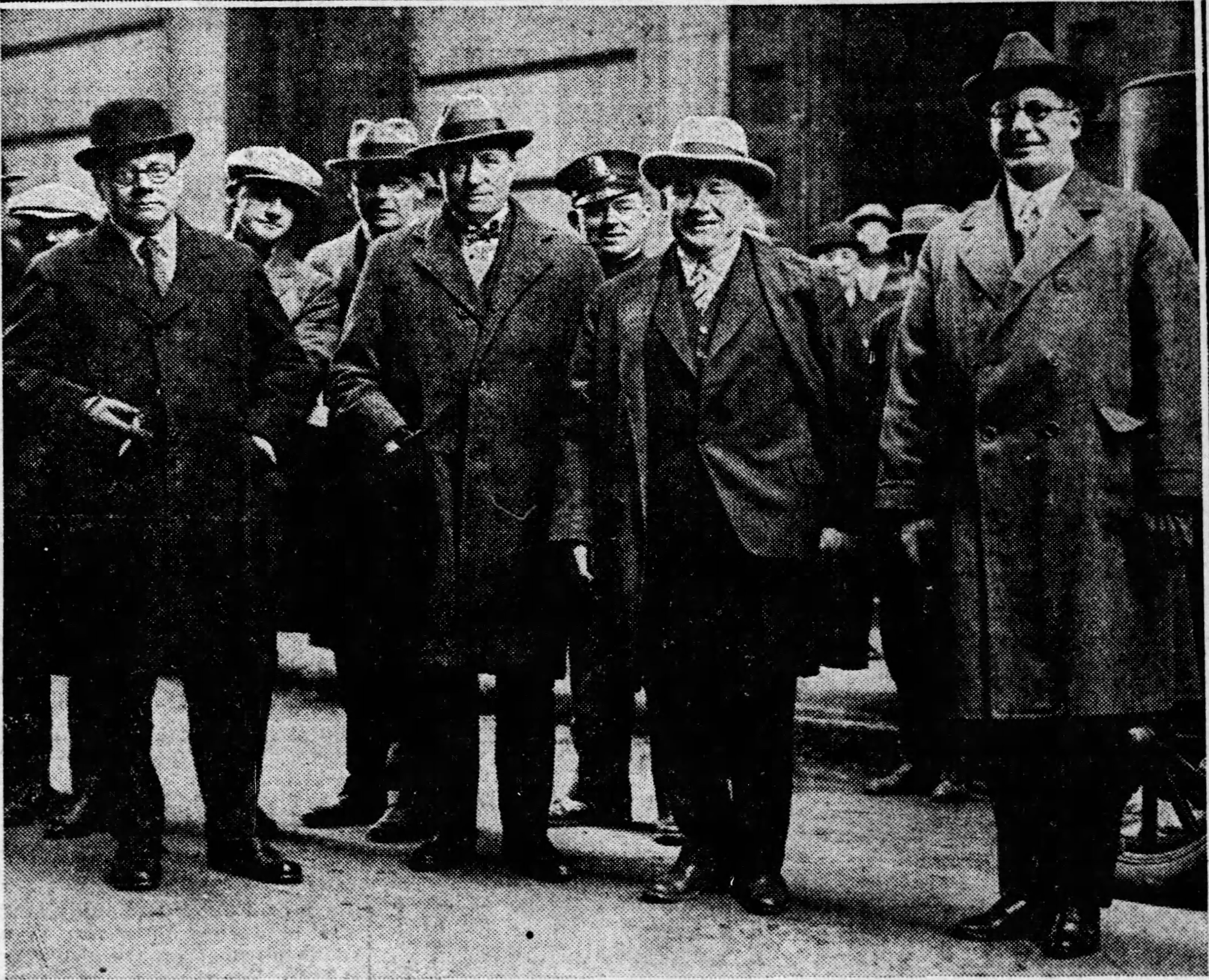
Candidates Nicholas, Keliher, Glynn, and O'Brien stand together outside of the annex of the Boston City Hall building

- Charles L. Burrill, member of the Massachusetts Executive Council since 1923, and former Treasurer and Receiver-General of Massachusetts (1915–1920)
- Daniel H. Coakley, disbarred attorney
- Alonzo B. Cook, Massachusetts State Auditor since 1915
- W. T. A. Fitzgerald, Register of Deeds, and former member of the Massachusetts Senate (1901–1903)
- Theodore A. Glynn, Commissioner of the Boston Fire Department
- John A. Keliher, Sheriff of Suffolk County since 1917, and former member of the U.S. House of Representatives (1903–11) and Massachusetts Senate (1899–1900)
- Walter G. McGauley, dentist
- Malcolm Nichols, former member of the Massachusetts House (1907–09) and Massachusetts Senate (1914, 1917–19)
- Thomas C. O'Brien, District Attorney of Suffolk County since 1922
- Joseph H. O'Neil, former member of the U.S. House of Representatives (1889–1895) and Massachusetts House (1878–1882, 1884)

== Results ==
Candidates	General Election	
Candidates	Votes	%
Malcolm Nichols	64,492	35.4%
Theodore A. Glynn	42,687	23.4%
Joseph H. O'Neil	31,888	17.5%
Daniel H. Coakley	20,144	11.1%
Thomas C. O'Brien	9,443	5.2%
John A. Keliher	7,737	4.2%
W. T. A. Fitzgerald	3,188	1.8%
Alonzo B. Cook	1,771	1.0%
Walter G. McGauley	437	0.2%
Charles L. Burrill	276	0.2%
all others	2	0.0%

== See also ==
- List of mayors of Boston, Massachusetts
