= Daniel H. Coakley =

American politician (1865–1952)

- Official portrait, 1930s

Member of the Massachusetts Governor's Council from the 4th district
- In office January 1933 – October 2, 1941
- Preceded by: James Henry Brennan
- Succeeded by: John M. Cunningham

Member of the Massachusetts House of Representatives
- In office 1893–1897

Personal details
- Born: December 10, 1865 Charlestown, Boston, Massachusetts
- Died: September 18, 1952 (aged 86)
- Party: Democratic
- Children: Daniel H. Coakley Jr.
- Occupation: Horse car conductor Journalist; Lawyer; Politician

Daniel Henry Coakley (December 10, 1865 – September 18, 1952) was an American sportswriter, attorney, and Democratic politician from Massachusetts. He was a key figure in early 20th century Boston politics, as an associate of Joseph C. Pelletier and mayor James Michael Curley. As an attorney, Coakley took part in numerous badger game extortion schemes and was disbarred in 1922 for deceit, malpractice, and gross misconduct.

Coakley later was elected to the Massachusetts Governor's Council, where he secured a pardon for mobster Raymond L. S. Patriarca. He was impeached and removed from office in 1941 for using his position and influence to secure pardons in exchange for financial gain.

== Early life and education ==
Daniel Coakley was born on December 10, 1865, in Charlestown, Boston. At fourteen, he left school to work as a teamster. He briefly attended Boston College for a few months, but he was unable to afford tuition and took a job as a conductor for the Cambridge Street Railway Company, working evenings as a bartender in Haymarket Square. He was fired from his job as ac conductor for "negligence" after he was caught repeatedly stealing fares.

Coakley relocated to New York City, where he picked up shorthand and became a reporter for The New York Sun.

In 1888, he returned to Boston as sports writer for the Boston Herald. He was later promoted to sports editor. In addition to sports writing, Coakley also worked as a boxing referee. In 1892, Coakley left the Herald to attend Boston University Law School and launch his first campaign for public office.

Coakley read law at his brother Timothy's law firm. He failed his first three attempts at the bar exam but was finally admitted to the Massachusetts bar on July 9, 1897, and the federal bar on January 25, 1911.

== Massachusetts House of Representatives ==
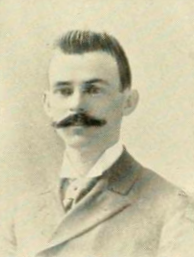
Official portrait, circa 1894

In 1892, Coakley was elected to the Massachusetts House of Representatives from Ward 2 in Cambridge. He was unseated in 1896 and moved across the Charles River to Boston, where he worked on the reelection campaign of U.S. Representative John F. Fitzgerald. As Mayor of Boston, Fitzgerald later appointed Coakley to the Boston Park Commission.

In 1909, Coakley managed the election campaign Suffolk County District Attorney Joseph C. Pelletier.

== Legal career ==
In 1909, Coakley served as the defense attorney for George H. Battis, a former Boston Alderman who was charged with larceny. Battis was found guilty on two charges of larceny.

In 1909, Coakley also served as defense counsel for Michael J. Mitchell, former head of Boston's supply department, who was found guilty of conspiracy to defraud the city and conspiracy to commit larceny. Coakley also served as counsel for William J. "Big Bill" Keliher, who was convicted of aiding in the looting of the National City Bank of Cambridge. He and Coakley later had a disagreement, and the police were called to remove Keliher from Coakley's office. Keliher accused Coakley of taking money from him to bribe United States Attorney Asa P. French, one French's assistants, and the jury. French did not believe Keliher's accusations and chose not to investigate.

In 1914, Coakley was sued by the widower of one of his clients, to recover the full amount of the $15,952 awarded to her in a suit against the Boston Elevated Railway. Coakley, who defended himself, received a favorable verdict.

In 1915, Coakley was hired to represent the Tylose Contracting Company before the Boston Finance Commission, which was investigating the usefulness and cost of the company's floor preservative. The Commission's public hearings lasted over 30 days and more than 65 witnesses were called. The commission found that tylose was a suitable floor preservative, and found no graft, though it criticized its price.

In 1920, Coakley served as an attorney for financier Charles Ponzi. Along with fellow attorney Daniel V. McIsaac, he advised Ponzi not to fight the case, which, along with the urging of his wife, convinced Ponzi to plead guilty to federal charges in hopes of receiving a lighter sentence. Coakley was later called as a witness in the Commonwealth of Massachusetts' case against Ponzi. As Ponzi's attorney, he received $25,000 a year from Ponzi in legal fees. Coakley turned in the money he had received from Ponzi to the receivers in Ponzi's bankruptcy case.

== Alliance with James Michael Curley ==
=== "Toodles" affair ===
Coakley turned against Mayor John F. Fitzgerald after Fitzgerald testified in court against one of Coakley's clients, Michael J. Mitchell, as part of an investigation into corruption during Fitzgerald's first term as mayor.

In 1913, Elizabeth "Toodles" Ryan, a cigarette girl at an illegal gambling establishment, hired Coakley to represent her in lawsuit against her employer, Henry Mansfield, who she said had reneged on his promise to marry her. Ryan revealed to Coakley that she had kissed Fitzgerald at a gambling club and Coakley turned over this information to one of Fitzgerald's political rivals, James Michael Curley. Coakley and Curley sent a letter revealing the affair to Fitzgerald's wife. Curley announced he would deliver a series a public lectures, including one entitled "Great Lovers in History: From Cleopatra to Toodles." Fitzgerald dropped out of the 1913 mayoral race (which Curley went on to win) and Curley never delivered the lecture. During Ryan's trial, Coakley elicited testimony from another man who had been involved with Ryan that he had witnessed Fitzgerald kiss Ryan. The incident was now a matter of official court record and made front-page headlines, which started the decline of Fitzgerald's political career.

=== Boston Finance Commission ===
During Curley's first term, Coakley represented the Mayor during the Boston Finance Commission's investigation into Curley's finances. Coakley got the investigation dropped by having the case transferred to District Attorney Joseph Pelletier, whom he had helped elect.

In 1917, Curley made Coakley a trustee of the Boston Public Library.

=== Falling out ===
Coakley and Curley had a falling out after Curley attacked Pelletier, who was considering running against Curley for mayor.

== Disbarment and legal troubles ==
On December 16, 1918, the council of the Boston Bar Association voted to investigate the conduct of Pelletier, Coakley, and Francis Carroll in connection with a case involving Emerson Motors Company. Pursuant to that investigation, Michael J. Hayes stole papers from Coakley's office and turned them over to Godfrey Lowell Cabot of the Watch and Ward Society.

In 1920, attorney Alvah G. Sleeper accused Coakley and Pelletier of extorting his client. Sleeper alleged that his client was being blackmailed by a mistress, and that Sleeper had followed his client to the payment point at the Parker House where he saw Coakley, Joseph Pelletier, and another attorney accept the payment. Shortly after witnessing this meeting, Sleeper was visited by the alleged blackmailer, who asked how much Coakley had received. Sleeper told her that the amount was $150,000, and she replied that Coakley had not given her a fair share.

Facing increased scrutiny, Coakley decided to press the matter of his stolen papers in response. On November 18, 1920, a grand jury indicted on Hayes, Cabot, and three other men on charges of conspiracy to steal Coakley's papers and larceny of property. Hayes and other defendant, Oswin T. Bourdon, pleaded guilty, but Cabot chose to go to trial, where he was found not guilty.

On September 29, 1921, the Boston Bar Association filed disbarment petitions against Coakley, Daniel V. McIssac, and former Middlesex District Attorney William J. Corcoran, along with a recommendation that Pelletier be removed from office, alleging that all four were guilty of deceit, malpractice, and gross misconduct. The allegations included:

- In 1915, he convinced William De Ford Bigelow to pay him $50,000 in exchange for Coakley using his influence with Pelletier to prevent indictment.
- Between 1916 and 1917, he and McIssac conspired to extort $116,000 from a client by fomenting a contest of her deceased husband's will.
- In October 1916, he extorted $20,500 from the Emerson Motors Company in exchange for using his personal influence with Pelletier to save the company from indictment.
- In November 1916, he attempted to extort $10,000 in legal fees from Warren C. Daniel of the Metropolitan Motors Company in exchange for convincing Pelletier not to indict the company.
- In 1917, he, James Curley, Corcoran, and Nathan A. Tufts (Corcoran's successor) extorted large sums of money from Paramount Studio executives who attended a party at a brothel.
- In 1918, while defending a client in a replevin suit brought by Dorothy Cote, he threatened Cote with indictment by the district attorney's office, which led her to drop the suit.
- In 1918, he, Tufts, and others conspired to extort a significant amount of money from a diver's pension.
- Beginning in 1918, Coakley extorted $300,000 from Edmund Barbour in exchange for keeping secret a non-sexual relationship with a woman 49 years his junior.

On April 17, 1922, Coakley walked out of a hearing and dropped his defense, stating that he felt he could not get an impartial trial. On April 21, the Massachusetts Supreme Judicial Court found that Coakley was guilty of deceit, malpractice, and gross misconduct. On May 12, he was disbarred. On May 16, United States Attorney Robert O. Harris filed a petition to disbar Coakley from practicing law in the United States Circuit Court of Appeals. Coakley failed to appear in court and was disbarred on July 3, 1922.

Pelletier was removed from office and died shortly thereafter.

=== Fallout and lawsuits ===
portrait of Coakley, circa 1925

In 1923, Coakley was sued by Meyer Berman, a former client who sought to recover $50,000 which he alleged Coakley had obtained through fraud. The charges were dismissed. Coakley was also indicted for perjury in connection with his testimony in the Berman case, but the charges were dropped in February 1924. In 1933, Thomas C. O'Brien, who was Suffolk District Attorney at the time Coakley was charged, stated that subsequent evidence had cleared Coakley.

In 1924, Coakley and Corcoran were charged with extortion. On July 3, 1924, after nearly 27 hours of deliberation, the jury found Coakley and Corcoran not guilty on all counts.

In 1926, Coakley was criminally charged with fraud after he was sued by another former client, Oda Pappathanos, for recovery of money she alleged Coakley had obtained by misrepresenting the size of the settlement of her claim against a wealthy Maine man. Coakley was found not guilty of the criminal charges on July 31, 1926.

On November 14, 1934, a jury awarded $77,433.33 to Francis D. Reardon of Emerson & Co. for failure to pay a $50,000 note owed by Coakley and his son-in-law, Charles L. Murdock, to the company's deceased president, Bartholomew Crowley.

=== Petition for reinstatement ===
In 1933, with written support from a number of notable individuals including Cardinal O'Connell, Thomas Francis Lillis, Louis J. Gallagher, Edwin Stark Thomas, William Robinson Pattangall, Eugene N. Foss, Thomas C. O'Brien, Alfred E. Smith, James Roosevelt, 65 judges, and 3,470 attorneys, Coakley petitioned for reinstatement to the bar. Governor Joseph B. Ely appeared in court on Coakley's behalf. His petition was denied by Judge Fred T. Field on March 28, 1934. Field wrote that Coakley's "deliberate misstatements" regarding his disbarment and his offer to admit guilt in exchange for readmission while also asserting his innocence showed a "lack of respect for the truth inconsistent with fitness for readmission to the bar".

== Later political career ==
=== Mayoral campaigns ===
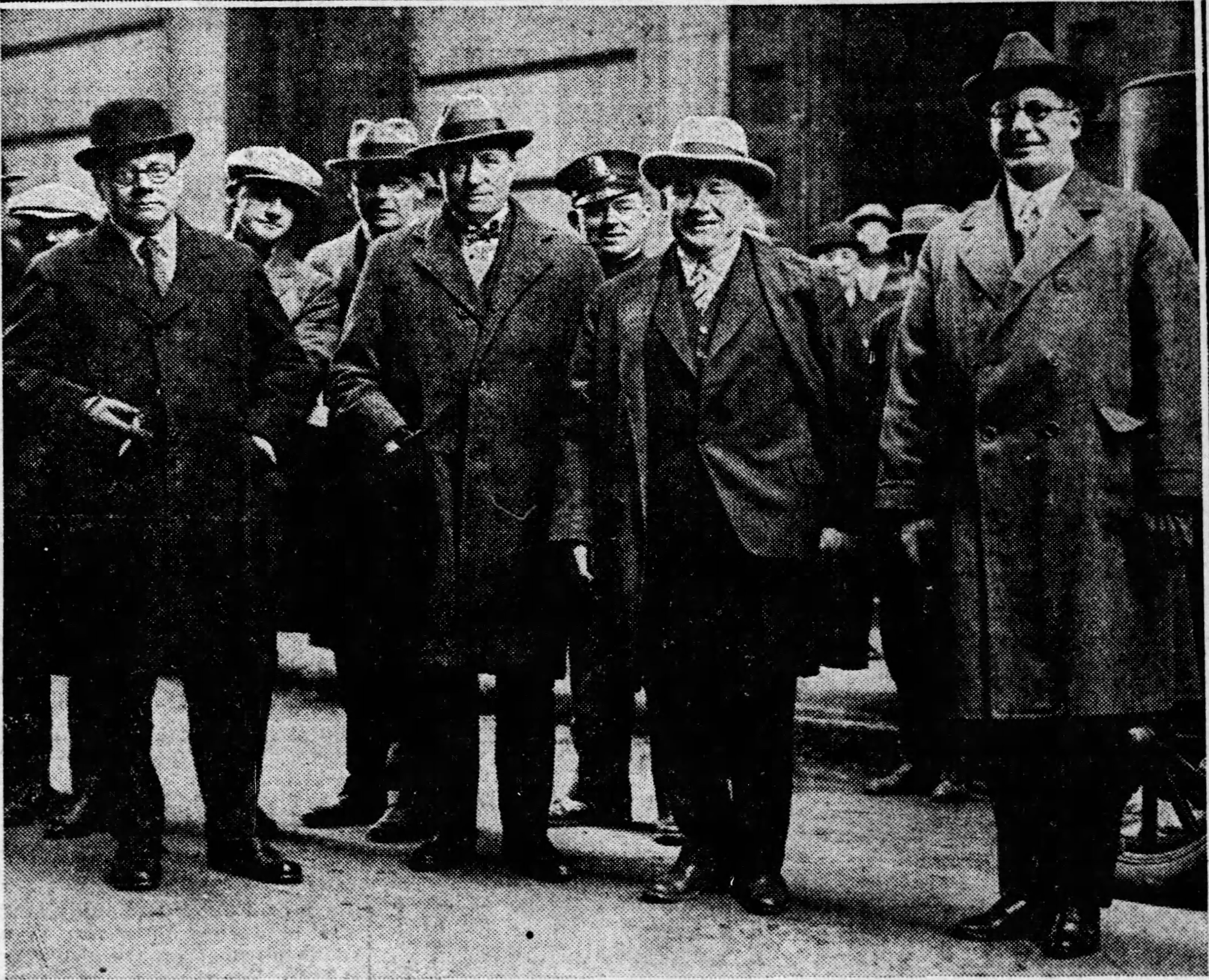
Several of Coakley's 1925 mayoral opponents pose together during their campaigns (left to right, in foreground): Malcolm Nichols, John Keliher, Theodore Glynn, Thomas C. O'Brien

In 1925, Coakley ran for Mayor of Boston on a platform of clearing the name of Joseph Pelletier. Coakley finished fourth behind Malcolm Nichols, Theodore Glynn, and Joseph O'Neil. He ran again in 1929, but finished a distant third with 1% of the vote. He ran a third time in 1933, but dropped out of the race, stating that he feared his "candidacy was likely to result in the election of an enemy of the plain people." Coakley's purpose in all three campaigns was to siphon votes away from Curley or his proxy.

=== Massachusetts Governor's Council ===
In 1932, Coakley was elected to the Massachusetts Governor's Council. Following Curley's election as governor in 1934, he and Coakley reconciled, as Curley needed his assistance to secure patronage jobs. During his tenure on the Council, Coakley acted as a prosecuting officer in many removal proceedings brought by Curley against state officials. Through his alliance with Governor Curley, Coakley was able to secure 2,000 patronage jobs for men from his district on the Quabbin Reservoir project. During the Charles F. Hurley administration, Coakley was not involved in strategy or procedure. Instead, his main role was as a critic of Lieutenant Governor Francis E. Kelly.

=== Impeachment ===
In 1938, Coakley wrote the petition for a pardon of Raymond Patriarca, a young mobster who later became the boss of New England organized crime. The petition contained praise from three priests. One had been tricked into signing the letter, another had never been consulted, and the third, a "Father Fagin," did not exist. The Governor's Council approved Patriarca's pardon, and he was released after only 84 days in jail.

On December 4, 1940, State Representative Roland D. Sawyer called for Coakley's impeachment, alleging that Coakley had attempted to "thwart" the Special Legislative Pardon-Probe Commission by contacting witnesses, threatening them, and advising them to commit perjury. On June 9, 1941, a special House committee found that Coakley had used his position and influence to secure pardons for Patriarca, Maurice Limon, and Frank W. Porter in exchange for financial gain and recommended his impeachment. On June 13, 1941, the Massachusetts House of Representatives voted 144 to 75 in favor of impeachment.

Coakley's impeachment trial was the first in Massachusetts since 1821. Attorney General Robert T. Bushnell and state representative Benjamin Priest conducted the prosecution. Senator Joseph B. Harrington and attorneys William H. Lewis and Francis E. Rafter served as defense counsel. The trial lasted six weeks. On October 2, 1941, the Massachusetts Senate found Coakley guilty on 10 of the 14 articles on impeachment. The Senate voted 28 to 10 to remove Coakley from office and 23 to 15 to bar him for life from holding a place of "profit or honor or trust" in the Commonwealth.

== Later life ==
Following his impeachment, Coakley ran for the United States Senate. In the Democratic primary, he finished fourth out of four candidates with 7% of the vote.

During his final years, Coakley appeared less frequently in the public eye. By 1946, he was complaining about his poor financial state. However, he was still able to keep a suite at the Parker House, a townhouse in Brighton, and a cottage in Cape Cod. He spent the final five years of his life in Buzzards Bay, Massachusetts, where he died on September 18, 1952.
