= Thomas C. O'Brien =

American politician

Thomas O'Brien
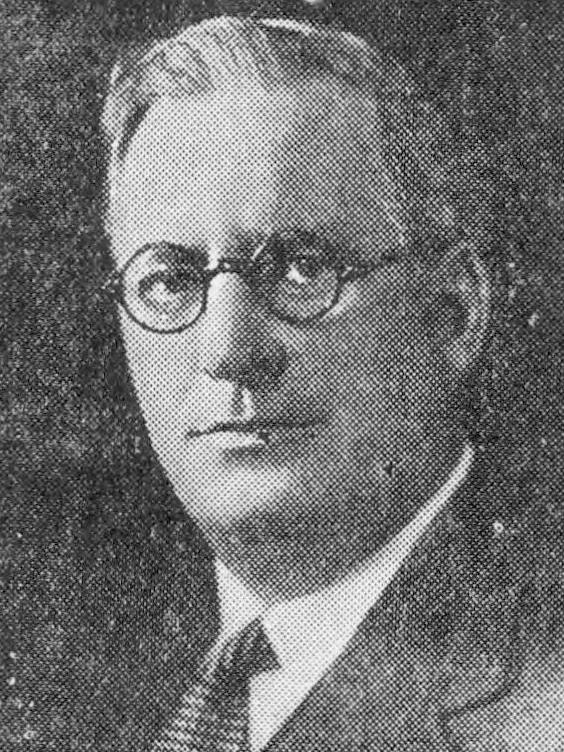

District Attorney of Suffolk County
- In office 1922–1927
- Preceded by: Joseph Pelletier
- Succeeded by: William J. Foley

Personal details
- Born: June 19, 1887 Boston, Massachusetts, U.S.
- Died: November 22, 1951 (aged 64) Boston, Massachusetts, U.S.
- Party: Democratic (Before 1935); Union (1935–1936)
- Education: Harvard University (BA, LLB)

Thomas Charles O'Brien (June 19, 1887 – November 22, 1951) was an American attorney and politician who served as District Attorney of Suffolk County, Massachusetts and was the United States vice-presidential nominee for the Union Party in the 1936 United States presidential election.

== Early life ==
O'Brien was born on June 19, 1887, in Brighton. He graduated from Harvard College in 1908 and Harvard Law School in 1911. Thomas O'Brien identified as Irish-American and was a practicing Catholic.

== Political career ==
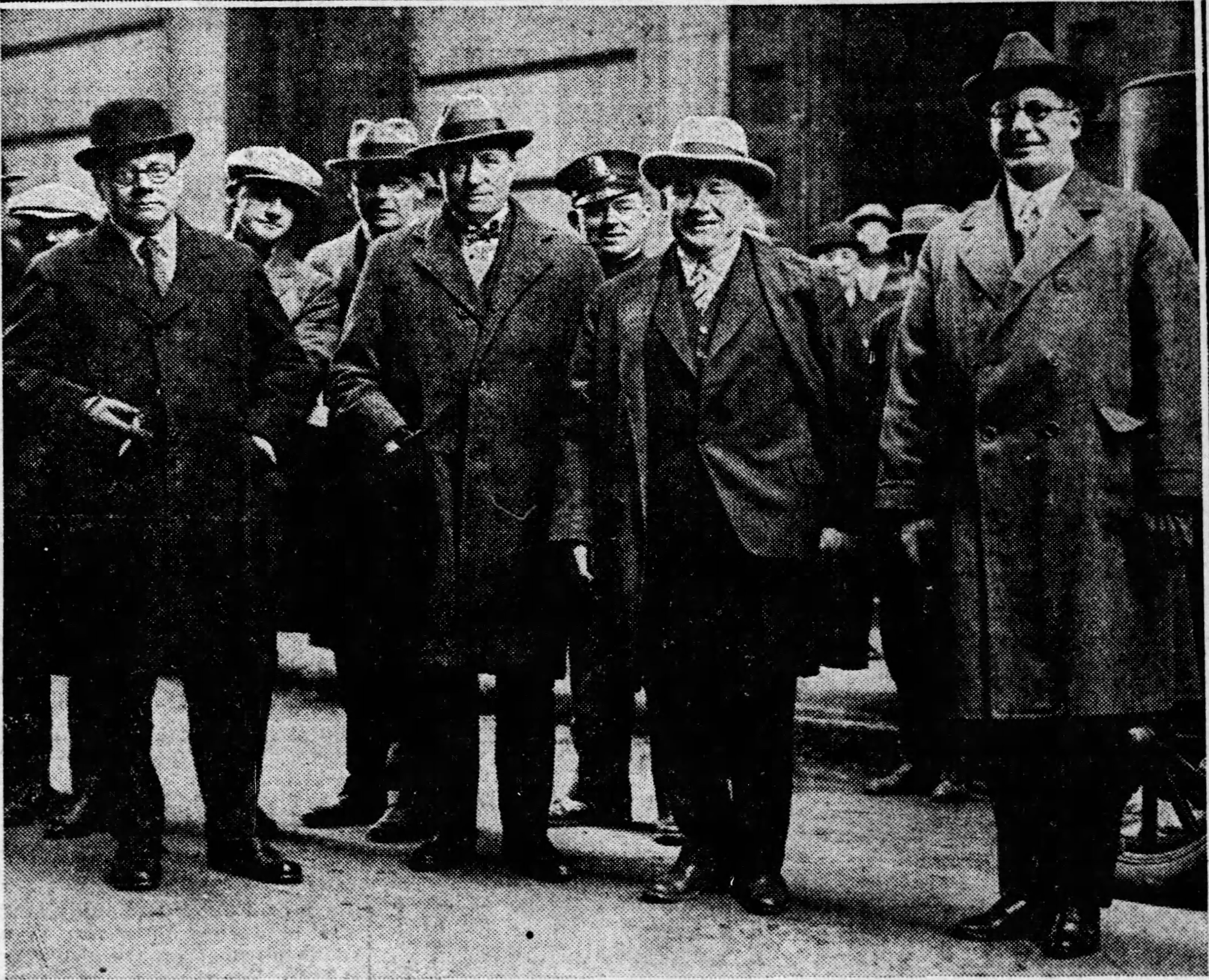
Several 1925 Boston mayoral election candidates stand together (left to right, in foreground): Malcolm Nichols, John Keliher, Theodore Glynn, and O'Brien

O'Brien was an unsuccessful candidate for the Massachusetts House of Representatives in 1912 and 1913. He was appointed to the state parole board in 1913 and from 1916 to 1919 he was deputy director of prisons. In 1919 he was appointed Boston's commissioner of penal institutions by Mayor Andrew James Peters. In 1922 he was appointed District Attorney of Suffolk County to fill the unexpired term of Joseph C. Pelletier. He was a candidate for mayor of Boston in 1925. He finished 5th in the 10 candidate field behind Malcolm Nichols, Theodore A. Glynn, Joseph H. O'Neil, and Daniel H. Coakley. In 1926, O'Brien was defeated for reelection by William J. Foley. In 1930 he was a candidate for the United States Senate seat held by William M. Butler. He finished third in the Democratic primary behind Marcus A. Coolidge and Joseph F. O'Connell.

In 1936, O'Brien left the Democratic Party to join the Union Party, a political party formed by supporters of Rev. Charles Coughlin's National Union for Social Justice. He was the party's candidate for vice president of the United States and the United States Senate in Massachusetts. The Union Party's ticket of U.S. Representative William Lemke and O'Brien received 2% of the vote in the presidential election. In the Senate election, O'Brien received 10% and 1.6% of the vote in the Democratic and Republican primaries, respectively, and 7.4% of the vote in the general election on the Union ticket.

A longtime labor lawyer, O'Brien served as regional counsel for the Brotherhood of Railroad Trainmen and the Brotherhood of Railroad Signalmen. He died on November 22, 1951, of a heart ailment.

Party political offices
New political party	Union nominee for Vice President of the United States; 1936	Party dissolved
