= List of United States major third-party and independent presidential tickets =

This is a list of major third party and independent tickets for President of the United States and Vice President of the United States.

== Criteria ==
The presidential candidates are listed here based on three criteria:

- They were not members of one of the six major parties in U.S. history: the Federalist Party, the Democratic-Republican Party, the National Republican Party, the Whig Party, the Democratic Party, and the Republican Party at the time of their candidacy. Independent candidates are included.
- They either received at least one electoral vote from an elector who was not a faithless elector, or they received at least one percent of the national popular vote in an election held after the national popular vote began to be recorded in 1824.
- They ran after the ratification of the Twelfth Amendment in 1804. (Note: Third parties did not emerge prior to the ratification of the Twelfth Amendment, but several individuals without a clear partisan affiliation won electoral votes between 1789 and 1796. See list of people who received an electoral vote in the United States Electoral College.)

== List of tickets ==
Election	Candidate					Vote		Running mate
Election	Candidate		Party	Office (Note: The most recent elective office, or senior appointive position, held by the candidate when the presidential election was held. If the candidate had never held an elective office or senior appointive position at the time of the election, then their profession is listed.)	Home state (Note: State of primary residence.)	PV%	EV%	Running mate
1832	William Wirt		Anti-Masonic	Fmr. Attorney General	MD	7.8%	2.4%	Amos Ellmaker
1832	John Floyd		Nullifier	Governor	VA	0%	3.8%	Henry Lee
1844	James G. Birney		Liberty	Fmr. state legislator	MI	2.3%	0%	Thomas Morris
1848	Martin Van Buren	Martin Van Buren	Free Soil	Fmr. President	NY	10.1%	0%	Charles F. Adams Sr.
1852	John P. Hale		Free Soil	Senator	NH	4.9%	0%	George W. Julian
1856	Millard Fillmore (Note: After the collapse of the Whig Party in the mid-1850s, the Republican Party and the American Party emerged as the major challengers to the Democratic Party. By 1856, neither the Republican nor the American Party had truly supplanted the Whig Party as the second major political party in the United States. Nonetheless, the American Party is frequently described as a third party. In 1856, the American Party, along with a rump convention of Whigs, nominated a presidential ticket led by former President Millard Fillmore. After the 1856 election, the Republican Party firmly established itself as one of the two major parties alongside the Democratic Party, while the American Party collapsed.)	Millard Fillmore	American	Fmr. President	NY	21.5%	2.7%	Andrew J. Donelson
1860	John C. Breckinridge (Note: The Democratic Party fractured along sectional lines in 1860 and held multiple national conventions. The Northern Democrats nominated Stephen A. Douglas and the Southern Democrats nominated Vice President John C. Breckinridge. Many sources include Breckinridge as a third party candidate, but other sources do not.)	John C. Breckinridge	Southern Democratic	Vice President	KY	18.2%	23.8%	Joseph Lane
1860	John Bell	John Bell	Constitutional Union	Fmr. Senator	TN	12.6%	12.9%	Edward Everett
1880	James B. Weaver		Greenback	Representative	IA	3.4%	0%	Barzillai J. Chambers
1884	John St. John		Prohibition	Fmr. Governor	KS	1.5%	0%	William Daniel
1884	Benjamin Butler		Greenback	Fmr. Governor	MA	1.3%	0%	Absolom M. West
1888	Clinton B. Fisk		Prohibition	General	NJ	2.2%	0%	John A. Brooks
1888	Alson Streeter		Union Labor	State legislator	IL	1.3%	0%	Charles E. Cunningham
1892	James B. Weaver		Populist	Fmr. Representative	IA	8.5%	5%	James G. Field
1892	John Bidwell		Prohibition	Fmr. Representative	CA	2.2%	0%	James B. Cranfill
1900	John G. Woolley		Prohibition	Attorney	IL	1.5%	0%	Henry B. Metcalf
1904	Eugene V. Debs		Socialist	Fmr. state legislator	IN	3.0%	0%	Ben Hanford
1904	Silas C. Swallow		Prohibition	Minister	PA	1.9%	0%	George W. Carroll
1908	Eugene V. Debs		Socialist	Fmr. state legislator	IN	2.8%	0%	Ben Hanford
1908	Eugene W. Chafin		Prohibition	Attorney	IL	1.7%	0%	Aaron S. Watkins
1912	Theodore Roosevelt	Theodore Roosevelt	Progressive (Note: Though the Progressive Party of 1912, the Progressive Party of 1924, and the Progressive Party of 1948 shared names and an affiliation with the progressive movement, they were three distinct political parties.)	Fmr. President	NY	27.4%	16.6%	Hiram Johnson
1912	Eugene V. Debs		Socialist	Fmr. state legislator	IN	6.0%	0%	Emil Seidel
1912	Eugene W. Chafin		Prohibition	Attorney	IL	1.7%	0%	Aaron S. Watkins
1916	Allan L. Benson		Socialist	Journalist	NY	3.2%	0%	George R. Kirkpatrick
1916	Frank Hanly		Prohibition	Fmr. Governor	IN	1.2%	0%	Ira Landrith
1920	Eugene V. Debs		Socialist	Fmr. state legislator	IN	3.4%	0%	Seymour Stedman
1924	Robert La Follette	Robert La Follette	Progressive	Senator	WI	16.6%	2.4%	Burton K. Wheeler
1932	Norman Thomas		Socialist	Minister	NY	2.2%	0%	James H. Maurer
1936	William Lemke		Union	Representative	NY	1.9%	0%	Thomas C. O'Brien
1948	Strom Thurmond		States' Rights	Governor	SC	2.4%	7.3%	Fielding L. Wright
1948	Henry A. Wallace		Progressive	Fmr. Vice President	IA	2.4%	0%	Glen H. Taylor
1968	George Wallace	George Wallace	American Independent	Fmr. Governor	AL	13.5%	8.6%	Curtis LeMay
1972	John G. Schmitz		American Independent	Representative	CA	1.4%	0%	Thomas J. Anderson
1980	John B. Anderson		Independent	Representative	IL	6.6%	0%	Patrick Lucey
1980	Ed Clark		Libertarian	Attorney	CA	1.1%	0%	David Koch
1992	Ross Perot	Ross Perot	Independent	Businessman	TX	18.9%	0%	James Stockdale
1996	Ross Perot	Ross Perot	Reform	Businessman	TX	8.4%	0%	Pat Choate
2000	Ralph Nader		Green	Attorney	CT	2.7%	0%	Winona LaDuke
2016	Gary Johnson		Libertarian	Fmr. Governor	NM	3.3%	0%	William Weld
2016	Jill Stein		Green	Physician	MA	1.1%	0%	Ajamu Baraka
2020	Jo Jorgensen		Libertarian	Professor	SC	1.2%	0%	Spike Cohen

== See also ==
- List of people who received an electoral vote in the United States Electoral College
- List of unsuccessful major party candidates for President of the United States
