= George F. Monahan =

American politician

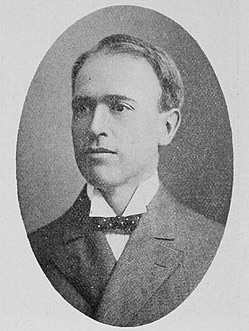

Member of the Massachusetts Senate for the 2nd Suffolk district
- In office 1908–1908
- Preceded by: James J. Mellen
- Succeeded by: Richard S. Teeling

Personal details
- Born: January 20, 1867 Boston
- Died: May 7, 1929 (aged 62) Boston
- Party: Democratic
- Occupation: Bar owner

George F. Monahan (January 20, 1867 – May 7, 1929) was an American politician who served in the Massachusetts Senate.

== Early life ==
Monahan was born on January 20, 1867, in Boston. He attended St. Mary's School for many years before leaving to work in a cigar factory.

== Business career ==
In 1890, Monahan opened a saloon on Friend Street in Boston. He later operated a bar at 20 Marshall Street. When the Wartime Prohibition Act went into effect on July 1, 1919, Monahan continued to serve beer in violation of the act. His was the only Boston bar to remain open after the act took effect.

Monahan also worked as a bail bondsman. During his first campaign for state senate, he provided $35,000 in bail for 12 men accused of illegal naturalization as well as actor Eben Plympton. Monahan's bailing out of the naturalization defendants was used in support of his candidacy. Shortly after his defeat, Monahan turned over the defendants and they were placed into custody until trial. Monahan was also involved in the real estate and insurance fields.

== Politics ==
In 1905, Monahan narrowly lost the Democratic nomination for the 2nd Suffolk seat in the Massachusetts Senate to incumbent James J. Mellen. He was elected to the senate in 1907 and represented the 2nd Suffolk district in the 1908 Massachusetts legislature. He was a Democratic candidate for Governor in the 1919 Massachusetts gubernatorial election. He finished third in the Democratic primary with 12% of the vote. In 1922, Monahan was a candidate for the United States House of Representatives seat in Massachusetts's 10th congressional district, but withdrew.

== Death ==
Monahan died on May 7, 1929, at his home in Brighton. He was survived by his wife, two sons, and two daughters. He was buried in Holyhood Cemetery.
