= List of Democratic-Republican Party presidential tickets =

This is a list of Democratic-Republican Party candidates for the offices of President of the United States and Vice President of the United States. Opponents who received over one percent of the popular vote or ran an official campaign that received Electoral College votes are listed. Offices held prior to Election Day are included, and those held on Election Day have an italicized end date.

== List of Democratic-Republican tickets ==
=== 1792 ===
Presidential nominee	1792 (lost) (Note: The Democratic-Republicans did not nominate a presidential nominee in 1792.)	Vice presidential nominee
None	Prior public experience: New York Assembly (1768–1776); Continental Congress (1775–1776); Governor of New York (1777–1795); Higher education: None	George Clinton of NY (1739–1812)
Opponent(s); George Washington (Independent)	Electoral vote: Washington: 132 (100%); Popular vote: Washington/Adams: 28,579 (100%)	Opponent(s); John Adams (Independent)

=== 1796, 1800, 1804 ===
Presidential nominee	1796 (lost), 1800 (won), 1804 (won)		Vice presidential nominee
Thomas Jefferson of VA (1743–1826)	Prior public experience: Virginia House of Burgesses (1769–1775); Continental Congress (1775–1776, 1783–1784); Virginia House of Delegates (1776–1779, 1782); Governor of Virginia (1779–1781); U.S. Minister to France (1785–1789); U.S. Secretary of State (1790–1793); Vice President (1797–1801); President (1801–1809); Higher education: College of William and Mary (BA)	Prior public experience: New York Assembly (1784–1785, 1798–1799); Attorney General of New York (1789–1791); U.S. Senate (1791–1797); Higher education: Princeton University (BA)	Aaron Burr of NY (1756–1836) (1796, 1800)
Thomas Jefferson of VA (1743–1826)	Prior public experience: Virginia House of Burgesses (1769–1775); Continental Congress (1775–1776, 1783–1784); Virginia House of Delegates (1776–1779, 1782); Governor of Virginia (1779–1781); U.S. Minister to France (1785–1789); U.S. Secretary of State (1790–1793); Vice President (1797–1801); President (1801–1809); Higher education: College of William and Mary (BA)	Prior public experience: New York Assembly (1768–1776); Continental Congress (1775–1776); Governor of New York (1777–1795, 1801–1804); Higher education: None	George Clinton of NY (1739–1812) (1804)
Opponent(s); John Adams (Federalist)	Electoral vote (Note: Prior to the ratification of the Twelfth Amendment in 1804, each member of the Electoral College cast two votes, with no distinction made between votes for president and votes for vice president. The Democratic-Republicans may or may not have officially nominated Jefferson for president through a congressional nominating caucus, but Jefferson was widely regarded as the party's main presidential candidate in the 1796 election. The Democratic-Republicans did not select an official vice presidential candidate. Aaron Burr finished with the second-most electoral votes among individuals affiliated with the party. Because Jefferson won more electoral votes than the second Federalist candidate, Thomas Pinckney, he was elected as vice president.): Adams: 71 (51.4%); Jefferson: 68 (49.3%); Popular vote: Adams/Pickney: 35,726 (53.4%); Jefferson/Burr: 31,115 (46.6%)		Opponent(s); Thomas Pinckney (Federalist)
Opponent(s); John Adams (Federalist)	Contingent vote: Jefferson: 10 (62.5%); Adams: 4 (25.0%); Blank: 2 (12.5%); Electoral vote: Jefferson: 73 (52.9%); Adams: 65 (47.1%); Popular vote: Jefferson/Burr: 41,330 (61.4%); Adams/Pickney: 25,952 (38.6%)		Opponent(s); Charles Pinckney (Federalist)
Opponent(s); Charles Pinckney (Federalist)	Electoral vote: Jefferson/Clinton: 162 (92.0%); Pinckney/King: 14 (8.0%); Popular vote: Jefferson/Clinton: 104,110 (72.8%); Pinckney/King: 38,919 (27.2%)		Opponent(s); Rufus King (Federalist)

=== 1808, 1812 ===
Presidential nominee	1808 (won), 1812 (won)		Vice presidential nominee
James Madison of VA (1751–1836)	Prior public experience: Virginia House of Delegates (1776–1777, 1784–1786, 1799–1801); Continental Congress (1781–1783, 1786–1787); U.S. House of Representatives (1789–1797); U.S. Secretary of State (1801–1809); President (1809–1817); Higher education: Princeton University (attended)	Prior public experience: New York Assembly (1768–1776); Continental Congress (1775–1776); Governor of New York (1777–1795, 1801–1804); Vice President (1805–1812); Higher education: None	George Clinton of NY (1739–1812) (1808)
James Madison of VA (1751–1836)	Prior public experience: Virginia House of Delegates (1776–1777, 1784–1786, 1799–1801); Continental Congress (1781–1783, 1786–1787); U.S. House of Representatives (1789–1797); U.S. Secretary of State (1801–1809); President (1809–1817); Higher education: Princeton University (attended)	Prior public experience: Massachusetts Provincial Congress (1772–1775); Continental Congress (1776–1780, 1783–1785); U.S. House of Representatives (1789–1793); Governor of Massachusetts (1810–1812); Higher education: Princeton University (BA, MA)	Elbridge Gerry of MA (1744–1814) (1812)
Opponent(s); Charles Pinckney (Federalist)	Electoral vote: Jefferson/Clinton: 122 (69.7%); Pinckney/King: 47 (26.9%); Popular vote: Jefferson/Clinton: 124,732 (64.7%); Pinckney/King: 62,431 (32.4%)		Opponent(s); Rufus King (Federalist)
Opponent(s); DeWitt Clinton (Federalist)	Electoral vote: Madison/Gerry: 128 (59.0%); Clinton/Ingersoll: 89 (41.0%); Popular vote: Madison/Gerry: 140,431 (50.4%); Clinton/Ingersoll: 132,781 (47.6%)		Opponent(s); Jared Ingersoll (Federalist)

=== 1816, 1820 ===
Presidential nominee	1816 (won), 1820 (won)		Vice presidential nominee
James Monroe of VA (1758–1831)	Prior public experience: Virginia House of Delegates (1782–1783, 1786–1788); Continental Congress (1783–1786); U.S. Senate (1790–1794); U.S. Minister to France (1794–1796); U.S. Minister to the United Kingdom (1803–1807); Governor of Virginia (1799–1802, 1811); U.S. Secretary of State (1811–1817); U.S. Secretary of War (1814–1815); President (1817–1825); Higher education: College of William and Mary (attended)	Prior public experience: New York Assembly (1803); Associate Justice of the New York Supreme Court (1804–1807); Governor of New York (1807–1817); Vice President (1817–1825); Higher education: Columbia University (BA)	Daniel Tompkins of NY (1774–1825)
Opponent(s); Rufus King (Federalist)	Electoral vote: Monroe/Tompkins: 183 (84.3%); King/Howard: 34 (15.7%); Popular vote: Monroe/Tompkins: 76,592 (68.2%); King/Howard: 34,740 (30.9%)		Opponent(s); John Howard (Federalist)
Opponent(s); None	Electoral vote (President): Monroe: 231 (98.3%); Blank: 3 (1.3%); Adams: 1 (0.4%); Electoral vote (Vice President): Tompkins: 218 (92.8%); Stockton: 8 (3.4%); Rodney: 4 (1.7%); Blank: 3 (1.3%); Harper: 1 (0.4%); Rush: 1 (0.4%); Popular vote: Monroe/Tompkins: 87,343 (80.6%); Federalist/Stockton: 17,465 (16.1%); Clinton: 1,893 (1.8%)		Opponent(s); Richard Stockton (Federalist)

=== 1824 ===
Presidential nominee	1824 (won) (Note: The Democratic-Republican Party was unable to unite behind a single candidate in 1824. Four Democratic-Republicans received electoral votes in the general election, and, as no candidate won a majority of the electoral vote, the election was decided in a contingent election held in the House of Representatives. John Quincy Adams won that contingent election. Most presidential electors who voted for either Adams or Jackson for president voted for John C. Calhoun for vice president. Similarly, most electors who cast their presidential vote for Clay cast their vice presidential vote for Nathaniel Macon, and most electors who cast their presidential vote for Crawford cast their vice presidential vote for Nathan Sanford.)		Vice presidential nominee
John Quincy Adams of MA (1767–1848)	Prior public experience: U.S. Ambassador to the Netherlands (1794–1797); U.S. Ambassador to Prussia (1797–1801); Massachusetts Senate (1802–1803); U.S. Senate (1803–1808); U.S. Ambassador to Russia (1809–1814); U.S. Ambassador to United Kingdom (1815–1817); U.S. Secretary of State (1817–1825); Higher education: Leiden University (attended); Harvard University (BA, MA)	Prior public experience: South Carolina House of Representatives (1808–1809); U.S. House of Representatives (1811–1817); U.S. Secretary of War (1817–1825); Higher education: Yale University (attended); Litchfield Law School (attended)	John C. Calhoun of SC (1782–1850)
Andrew Jackson of TN (1767–1845)	U.S. House of Representatives (1796–1797); U.S. Senate (1797–1798, 1823–1825); Chair of the Senate Military Affairs Committee (1823–1825); Justice of the Tennessee Supreme Court (1798–1804); Governor of Florida (1821); Higher education: None	Prior public experience: South Carolina House of Representatives (1808–1809); U.S. House of Representatives (1811–1817); U.S. Secretary of War (1817–1825); Higher education: Yale University (attended); Litchfield Law School (attended)	John C. Calhoun of SC (1782–1850)
William Crawford of GA (1772–1834)	Prior public experience: Georgia House of Representatives (1803–1807); U.S. Senate (1807–1813); President pro tempore of the U.S. Senate (1812–1813); U.S. Minister to France (1813–1815); U.S. Secretary of War (1815–1816); U.S. Secretary of the Treasury (1816–1825); Higher education: None	Prior public experience: Pennsylvania House of Representatives (1790–1792); U.S. Senate (1793–1794); U.S. House of Representatives (1795–1801); U.S. Secretary of the Treasury (1801–1814); U.S. Minister to France (1816–1823); Higher education: University of Geneva (BA)	Albert Gallatin of PA (1761–1849) (Note: Gallatin was nominated by the party's congressional caucus and withdrew in favor of Macon.)
William Crawford of GA (1772–1834)	Prior public experience: Georgia House of Representatives (1803–1807); U.S. Senate (1807–1813); President pro tempore of the U.S. Senate (1812–1813); U.S. Minister to France (1813–1815); U.S. Secretary of War (1815–1816); U.S. Secretary of the Treasury (1816–1825); Higher education: None	Prior public experience: North Carolina Senate (1781, 1782, 1784); U.S. House of Representatives (1791–1815); Chair of the House Unfinished Business Committee (1797–1799); Chair of the House Claims Committee (1799–1801); Speaker of the U.S. House of Representatives (1801–1807); Chair of the House Public Expenditures Committee (1813–1815); U.S. Senate (1815–1828); Chair of the Senate Foreign Relations Committee (1818–1819); Chair of the Senate Audit Committee (1822–1823); Higher education: Princeton University (attended)	Nathaniel Macon of NC (1757–1837)
Henry Clay of KY (1777–1852)	Prior public experience: Kentucky House of Representatives (1803–1805, 1808–1809); Speaker of the Kentucky House of Representatives (1809); U.S. Senate (1806–1807, 1810–1811); U.S. House of Representatives (1811–1814, 1815–1821, 1823–1825); Speaker of the U.S. House of Representatives (1811–1814, 1815–1820, 1823–1825); Higher education: College of William and Mary (attended)	Prior public experience: U.S. Attorney for the District of New York (1803–1815); New York Assembly (1808–1809, 1811); Speaker of the New York Assembly (1811); New York Senate (1812–1815); U.S. Senate (1815–1821); Chair of the Senate Commerce Committee (1817–1820); Chair of the Senate Naval Affairs Committee (1818–1819); Chair of the Senate Finance Committee (1819–1821); Chancellor of New York (1823–1826); Higher education: Yale University (attended); Litchfield Law School (attended)	Nathan Sanford of NY (1777–1838)
Opponent(s); None	Contingent vote: Adams: 13 (54.2%); Jackson: 7 (29.2%); Crawford: 4 (16.7%); Electoral vote: Jackson: 99 (37.9%); Adams: 84 (32.2%); Crawford: 41 (15.7%); Clay: 37 (14.2%); Popular vote: Jackson: 151,271 (41.4%); Adams: 113,122 (30.9%); Clay: 47,531 (13.0%); Crawford: 40,856 (11.2%)		Opponent(s); None

== Other candidates ==
In addition to the individuals listed above, other Democratic-Republicans received electoral votes between 1792 and 1824. In the 1792 election, George Washington effectively ran unopposed for president, but the nascent Democratic-Republican Party attempted to defeat Vice President John Adams's bid for re-election through the candidacy of George Clinton. Thomas Jefferson and Aaron Burr also received votes in that election. In the 1796 election, Clinton, Samuel Adams, and John Henry each received votes. In the 1808 election, John Langdon, James Madison, and James Monroe all received votes for vice president, while Clinton received a small number of votes for president. In the 1824 election, Martin Van Buren received nine electoral votes for vice president. During that same election, the Democratic-Republican congressional nominating caucus nominated a ticket consisting of William H. Crawford and former Secretary of the Treasury Albert Gallatin, but Gallatin ultimately withdrew from the race.

In the 1812 election, Madison's main opponent, DeWitt Clinton, was nominated for president by a legislative caucus of New York Democratic-Republicans. The Federalist Party did not officially nominate Clinton, but most Federalist leaders tacitly supported Clinton's candidacy in hopes of defeating Madison.
