= List of Federalist Party presidential tickets =

This is a list of Federalist Party candidates for the offices of President of the United States and Vice President of the United States. Opponents who received over one percent of the popular vote or ran an official campaign that received Electoral College votes are listed. Offices held prior to Election Day are included, and those held on Election Day have an italicized end date.

== List of Federalist tickets ==
=== 1796, 1800 ===
Presidential nominee	1796 (won), 1800 (lost)		Vice presidential nominee
John Adams of MA (1735–1826)	Prior public experience: Continental Congress (1774–1777); U.S. Envoy to France (1777–1779); U.S. Minister to the Netherlands (1782–1788); U.S. Minister to the United Kingdom (1785–1788); Vice President (1789–1797); President (1797–1801); Higher education: Harvard University (BA, MA)	Prior public experience: Governor of South Carolina (1787–1789); South Carolina House of Representatives (1791); U.S. Minister to the United Kingdom (1792–1796); Higher education: Christ Church, Oxford (BA); Special Military School of St. Cyr (attended); Inner Temple (attended)	Thomas Pinckney of SC (1750–1828) (1796)
John Adams of MA (1735–1826)	Prior public experience: Continental Congress (1774–1777); U.S. Envoy to France (1777–1779); U.S. Minister to the Netherlands (1782–1788); U.S. Minister to the United Kingdom (1785–1788); Vice President (1789–1797); President (1797–1801); Higher education: Harvard University (BA, MA)	Prior public experience: South Carolina House of Representatives (1788–1790); South Carolina Senate (1790–1796); U.S. Minister to France (1796–1797); Higher education: Christ Church, Oxford (attended); Middle Temple (attended)	Charles Pinckney of SC (1746–1825) (1800)
Opponent(s); Thomas Jefferson (Democratic-Republican)	Electoral vote (Note: Prior to the ratification of the Twelfth Amendment in 1804, each member of the Electoral College cast two votes, with no distinction made between votes for president and votes for vice president. Federalist leaders agreed to support a ticket of John Adams and Thomas Pinckney, though it is unclear whether they formally nominated the ticket at a congressional nominating caucus. Ultimately, Adams won the most electoral votes and became president. Because Democratic-Republican candidate Thomas Jefferson won more electoral votes than Pinckney, he was elected as vice president.): Adams: 71 (51.4%); Jefferson: 68 (49.3%); Popular vote: Adams/Pinckney: 35,726 (53.4%); Jefferson/Burr: 31,115 (46.6%)		Opponent(s); Aaron Burr (Democratic-Republican)
Opponent(s); Thomas Jefferson (Democratic-Republican)	Contingent vote: Jefferson: 10 (62.5%); Adams: 4 (25.0%); Blank: 2 (12.5%); Electoral vote (Note: Prior to the ratification of the Twelfth Amendment in 1804, each member of the Electoral College cast two votes, with no distinction made between votes for president and votes for vice president. The Federalist congressional nominating caucus nominated a ticket of Adams and Charles C. Pinckney. Though the party did not officially nominate either candidate for president or vice president, most Federalists favored Adams for president and Pinckney for vice president. Ultimately, Adams won 65 electoral votes and Pinckney won 64 electoral votes.): Jefferson: 73 (52.9%); Adams: 65 (47.1%); Popular vote: Jefferson/Burr: 41,330 (61.4%); Adams/Pickney: 25,952 (38.6%)		Opponent(s); Aaron Burr (Democratic-Republican)

=== 1804, 1808 ===
Presidential nominee	1804 (lost), 1808 (lost)		Vice presidential nominee
Charles Pinckney of SC (1746–1825)	Prior public experience: South Carolina House of Representatives (1788–1790); South Carolina Senate (1790–1796); U.S. Minister to France (1796–1797); Higher education: Christ Church, Oxford (attended); Middle Temple (attended)	Prior public experience: U.S. Senate (1789–1796); U.S. Minister to the United Kingdom (1796–1803); Higher education: Harvard University (BA)	Rufus King of NY (1755–1827)
Opponent(s); Thomas Jefferson (Democratic-Republican)	Electoral vote: Jefferson/Clinton: 162 (92.0%); Pinckney/King: 14 (8.0%); Popular vote: Jefferson/Clinton: 104,110 (72.8%); Pinckney/King: 38,919 (27.2%)		Opponent(s); George Clinton (Democratic-Republican)
Opponent(s); James Madison (Democratic-Republican)	Electoral vote: Madison/Clinton: 122 (69.7%); Pinckney/King: 47 (26.9%); Popular vote: Madison/Clinton: 124,732 (64.7%); Pinckney/King: 62,431 (32.4%)		Opponent(s); George Clinton (Democratic-Republican)

=== 1812 ===
Presidential nominee	1812 (lost)		Vice presidential nominee
DeWitt Clinton of NY (Note: Clinton was a Northern Democratic-Republican who challenged the incumbent Democratic-Republican president, James Madison, in the general election. Clinton was nominated for president by a legislative caucus of New York Democratic-Republicans, and much of his support came from Democratic-Republicans dissatisfied with Madison's leadership in the War of 1812. The Federalist Party did not officially nominate Clinton, but most Federalist leaders tacitly supported Clinton's candidacy in hopes of defeating Madison.) (1769–1828)	Prior public experience: New York Assembly (1798); New York Senate (1798–1802, 1806–1811); U.S. Senate (1802–1803); Mayor of New York City (1803–1807, 1808–1810, 1811–1815); Lieutenant Governor of New York (1811–1813); Higher education: Princeton University (attended); Columbia University (BA)	Prior public experience: Continental Congress (1780–1781); Attorney General of Pennsylvania (1791–1800, 1811–1816); Higher education: Yale University (BA); Middle Temple	Jared Ingersoll of PA (1749–1822)
Rufus King of NY (Note: The state Federalist parties in New York and Virginia refused to support Clinton's candidacy, and instead nominated King. King appeared on the ballot in place of Clinton in Virginia, while New York's electoral votes were decided by the state legislature, which gave all its votes to Clinton.) (1755–1827)	Prior public experience: U.S. Senate (1789–1796); U.S. Minister to the United Kingdom (1796–1803); Higher education: Harvard University (BA)	Prior public experience: Governor of North Carolina (1798-1799); Higher education: Princeton University (attended)	William Davie of NC (1756–1820)
Opponent(s); James Madison (Democratic-Republican)	Electoral vote: Madison/Gerry: 128 (59.0%); Clinton/Ingersoll: 89 (41.0%); Popular vote: Madison/Gerry: 140,431 (50.4%); Clinton/Ingersoll: 132,781 (47.6%); King/Davie: 5,574 (2.0%)		Opponent(s); Elbridge Gerry (Democratic-Republican)

=== 1816 ===
Presidential nominee	1816 (lost) (Note: The Federalists did not nominate a ticket in 1816, though some Federalists were elected to serve as presidential electors. A majority of the Federalist electors cast their presidential vote for King and their vice presidential vote for Howard.)		Vice presidential nominee
Rufus King of NY (1755–1827)	Prior public experience: U.S. Senate (1789–1796, 1813–1819); U.S. Minister to the United Kingdom (1796–1803); Higher education: Harvard University (BA)	Prior public experience: Continental Congress (1788); Governor of Maryland (1788–1791); Maryland Senate (1791–1795); U.S. Senate (1796–1803); President pro tempore of the U.S. Senate (1800); Higher education: None	John Howard of MD (1752–1827)
Opponent(s); James Monroe (Democratic-Republican)	Electoral vote: Monroe/Tompkins: 183 (84.3%); King/Howard: 34 (15.7%); Popular vote: Monroe/Tompkins: 76,592 (68.2%); King/Howard: 34,740 (30.9%)		Opponent(s); Daniel Tompkins (Democratic-Republican)

=== 1820 ===
Presidential nominee	1820 (lost)	Vice presidential nominee
None (Note: The Federalists did not nominate a presidential nominee in 1820.)	Prior public experience: U.S. Attorney for the District of New Jersey (1789–1791); U.S. Senate (1796–1799); U.S. House of Representatives (1813–1815); Higher education: Princeton University (BA)	Richard Stockton of NJ (1764–1828)
Opponent(s); James Monroe (Democratic-Republican)	Electoral vote (President): Monroe: 231 (98.3%); Blank: 3 (1.3%); Adams: 1 (0.4%); Electoral vote (Vice President): Tompkins: 218 (92.8%); Stockton: 8 (3.4%); Rodney: 4 (1.7%); Blank: 3 (1.3%); Harper: 1 (0.4%); Rush: 1 (0.4%); Popular vote: Monroe/Tompkins: 87,343 (80.6%); Federalist/Stockton: 17,465 (16.1%); Clinton: 1,893 (1.8%)	Opponent(s); Daniel Tompkins (Democratic-Republican)

== Other candidates ==
In addition to the candidates listed above, other Federalists received electoral votes between 1796 and 1820. In the 1796 election, Oliver Ellsworth, John Jay, James Iredell, Samuel Johnston, and Charles Cotesworth Pinckney all received at least one electoral vote. Jay also received a single vote in the 1800 election. In the 1816 election, Robert Goodloe Harper, John Marshall, and James Ross all received electoral votes for vice president. In the 1820 election, Robert Goodloe Harper, Daniel Rodney, and Richard Rush all received at least one electoral vote for vice president.
