= John F. J. Herbert =

American military officer, American Legion, and prohibition agent (1874–1932)

- Born: May 14, 1874; Worcester, Massachusetts, U.S.
- Died: December 4, 1932 (aged 58); Honolulu, Hawaii, U.S.
- Burial place: St. John's Cemetery; Worcester, Massachusetts
- Military career
- Branch: United States Army
- Service years: 1917–1919
- Rank: Colonel
- Commands: 102nd Field Artillery Regiment
- Other work: Prohibition agent

John F. J. Herbert (May 14, 1874 – December 4, 1932) was an American military officer who served with the 102nd Field Artillery Regiment during World War I. After the war, he helped organize the American Legion and was a prohibition officer in Maryland, Montana, Illinois, and Hawaii.

== Early life ==
Herbert was born on May 14, 1874, in Worcester, Massachusetts. He was a standout athlete, rowing on the eight that won the 1893 New England Amateur Rowing Association regatta in 1893 and the 1895 National Association of Amateur Oarsmen's national championship. He competed in track at Worcester High School and played tackle for the school's football team. He was captain of the 1893 WHS football team, which was the first in school history to beat the Worcester Academy twice in one season.

== Military service ==
Herbert joined the Massachusetts Volunteer Militia as a lieutenant on May 18, 1904. He served with Battery B of the 1st Battalion of Field Artillery. He was a captain when the battalion was mobilized to the Mexican border in June 1916. He was called to active duty on August 5, 1917, and promoted to major. He served overseas with the 102d Field Artillery. He was promoted to Lieutenant Colonel on June 29, 1918, and colonel on February 22, 1919. He was commander of the 102nd from August 13, 1918, to October 12, 1918. The regiment was demobilized on April 29, 1919. After the war, Herbert was an officer with the Massachusetts National Guard. He commanded the XI Corps Artillery Headquarters from November 1921 to January 1924 and the 180th Field Artillery Brigade from January 1924 to February 1924.

== American Legion ==
In May 1919, Herbert led the Massachusetts delegation the American Legion's St. Louis Caucus and was elected to the organization's national executive committee. He spoke against the proposal to hold the group's first national convention in Chicago due to mayor William Hale Thompson's neutral stance during World War I. Following his speech, the convention delegates voted to hold the convention in Minneapolis instead, while Chicago, which had been the unanimous selection of site selection committee, finished third.

After the caucus, Herbert served as acting state commander. He organized the Legion's first state convention and reviewed applications of new posts. After announcing his candidacy for Lieutenant Governor of Massachusetts on August 5, 1919, he submitted his resignation to the state's executive committee, but it was declined, as they believed his departure during the formative days of the Legion would harm the group and did not think he would be involved in any serious political activity until after officers who could take over his duties were elected at the first state convention. Both Herbert and the committee believed that statewide candidates for political office should not serve as state officers in the American Legion, so he declined to run for state commander. On October 16, 1919, Edward Lawrence Logan was elected commander at the first state convention.

Herbert was the Massachusetts delegation's choice for National Commander at the 1920 national convention. He received 233 votes on the first ballot, which put him in third place behind Frederick W. Galbraith and Hanford MacNider. After losing votes to Galbraith on the second ballot, Herbert and MacNider withdrew and called for Galbraith's unanimous election. In 1924, it was reported that Herbert was being considered for National Commander by a joint caucus of 22 states. The caucus chose to vote for James A. Drain, who was elected on the first ballot.

== Campaign for Lieutenant Governor ==
On August 5, 1919, the Massachusetts Democratic state committee selected Herbert as its candidate for Lieutenant Governor. It was believed that Herbert would bring the veteran vote to the Democratic ticket. Herbert won the Democratic primary unopposed. The Democratic ticket was swept in that year's state elections. Herbert lost to Republican incumbent Channing H. Cox 298,010 votes to 188,127.

== Veterans' Bureau ==
Herbert was the employment officer for the New England district of the United States Veterans' Bureau. In 1923, he became temporary district manager after Arthur Brides was suspended pending the results of an investigation. Brides was cleared, but resigned. Herbert expressed a desire to hold the office permanently, but did not believe he would receive the appointment because he was a Democrat. The position would go to Edgar G. Crossman, a Republican.

== Bureau of Prohibition ==
On December 1, 1926, Herbert became the prohibition director of the district of Maryland and Washington, D.C., which was headquartered in Baltimore. In 1929, his assistant, John J. Quinn, was dismissed and Herbert was transferred to the Montana–Idaho district. According to United States Senator William Borah, an investigator from the Department of Justice told him that Herbert and Quinn had a "record of malfeasance and corruption", and, along with Senator Burton K. Wheeler, demanded his removal from their district. Herbert was defended on the floor of the United States House of Representatives by George R. Stobbs, who represented Herbert's home district. On January 31, 1930, prohibition commissioner James M. Doran promised he would hold an inquiry into the charges against Herbert. On February 4, Senator David I. Walsh of Massachusetts arranged for Borah to meet with Herbert and Borah promised not to press for further investigation if Herbert was cleared by Doran. The following day, Doran cleared Herbert of all charges and ordered his return to duty. Frank S. Flynn, a clerk of the Bureau of Prohibition who had made the allegations against Herbert, was fired.

On July 1, 1930, the Bureau of Prohibition was transfer from the United States Department of the Treasury to the Department of Justice and number of prohibition districts was consolidated from 27 to 12. Herbert was made administrator of district seven, which was headquartered in Chicago.

In February 1932, Herbert was transferred to Hawaii. On February 21, 1932, he suffered a stroke, which left him semi-conscious, unable to speak, and partially paralyzed. He died on December 4, 1932, at Tripler General Hospital in Honolulu. His body arrived at Worcester's Union Station on December 24, 1932, and was met by over 500 people. He received a military escort from members of the 102nd Field Artillery Regiment and the Worcester Post of the American Legion to the State Armoy, where he lay in state for two days. A requiem was held at the Church of the Blessed Sacrament and he was buried at St. John's Cemetery.

Party political offices
Preceded by Joseph H. O'Neil	Democratic nominee for Lieutenant Governor of Massachusetts; 1919	Succeeded by Marcus A. Coolidge
