= Daniel H. Coakley Jr. =

American politician

Member of the Massachusetts House of Representatives from the 22nd Suffolk district
- In office 1936–1939
- Preceded by: Leo Birmingham
- Succeeded by: Jeremiah D. W. Crowley

Personal details
- Born: July 12, 1906 Boston
- Died: March 26, 1964 (aged 57) Boston
- Party: Democratic
- Education: College of the Holy Cross (BA); Boston University (LLB)

Daniel H. Coakley (July 12, 1906 – March 26, 1964) was an American politician and lawyer who was a member of the Massachusetts House of Representatives.

== Early life and education ==
Coakley was born on July 12, 1906, in Boston. His father, Daniel H. Coakley, was a prominent politician. Coakley graduated from Boston College High School and the College of the Holy Cross. He later attended Fordham Law School and graduated from Boston University Law School in 1935. He then became a legal clerk to Massachusetts Attorney General Paul A. Dever.

== Massachusetts House of Representatives ==
In 1936, Coakley ran in the special election to fill the vacancy caused by the death of state representative Leo Birmingham. He defeated eight other candidates to win the Democratic nomination and won the general election by a 4 to 1 margin. He was elected to a full term later that year.

During World War II, Coakley served in the United States Coast Guard.

== Insurance ==
In 1946, Coakley joined New York Life Insurance Company. He eventually obtained $1 million in sales a year. In 1957, he was the top salesman in his company with $5 million in sales.

== Death ==
Coakley died on March 26, 1964, in Peter Bent Brigham Hospital.

== See also ==
- 1937–1938 Massachusetts legislature
