= Joseph H. O'Neil =

American politician (1853-1935)

Joseph Henry O'Neil
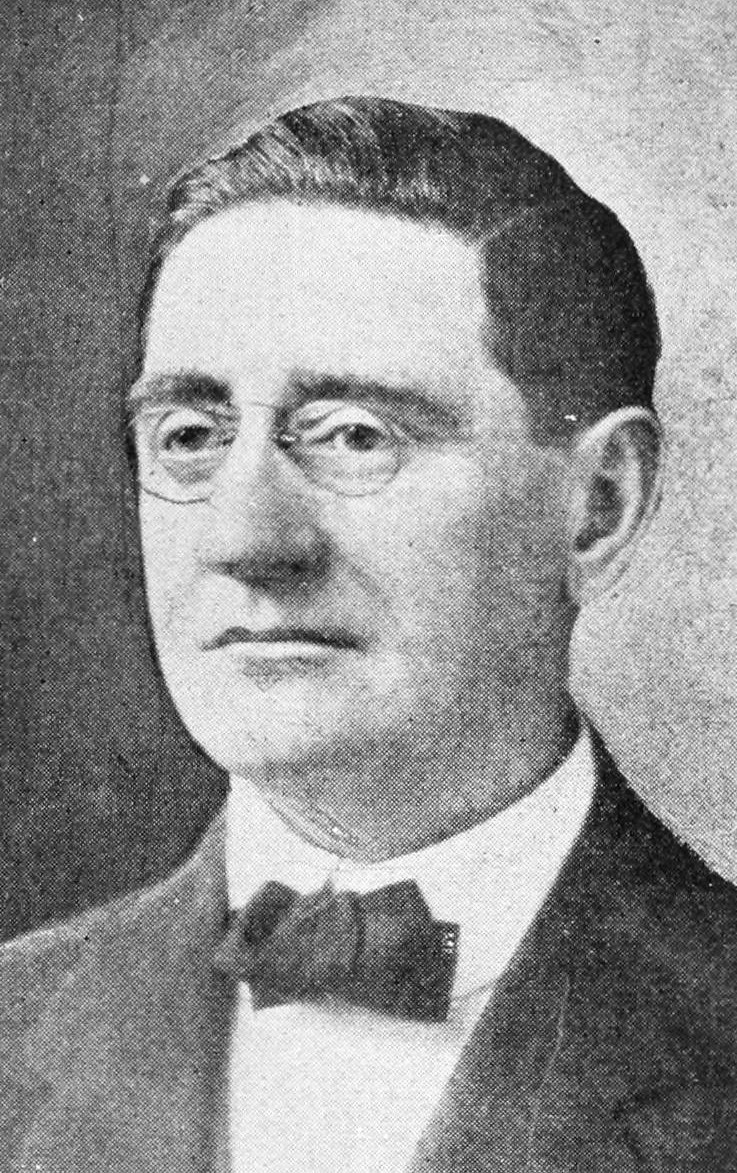
- O'Neil, circa 1917

Member of the U.S. House of Representatives from Massachusetts
- In office March 4, 1889 – March 3, 1895
- Preceded by: Patrick A. Collins
- Succeeded by: John F. Fitzgerald
- Constituency: 4th district (1889–93); 9th district (1893–95)

Boston City Clerk
- In office 1887–1888
- Preceded by: Eugene Henry Sampson
- Succeeded by: Edwin Upton Curtis

Chairman of the Boston Board of Directors for Public Institutions
- In office 1885–1886

Member of the Boston Board of Directors for Public Institutions
- In office 1880–1886

Member of the Massachusetts House of Representatives
- In office 1884; 1878-1882

Member of the Boston School Committee
- In office 1874–1877

Personal details
- Born: March 23, 1853 Fall River, Massachusetts, U.S.
- Died: February 19, 1935 (aged 81) Boston, Massachusetts, U.S.
- Party: Democratic

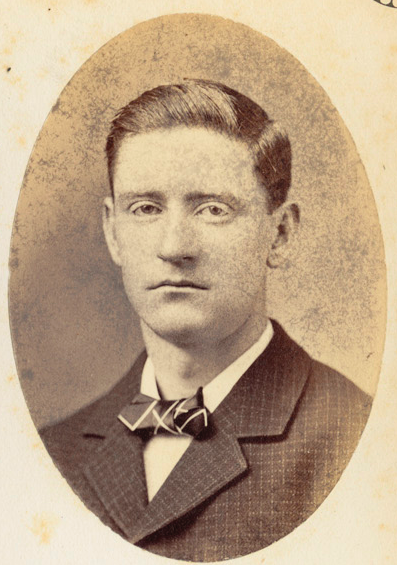
O'Neil, circa 1880

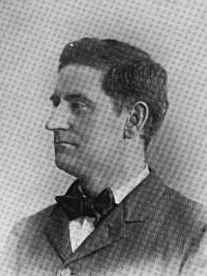
O'Neil, circa 1893

Joseph Henry O'Neil (March 23, 1853 – February 19, 1935) was a U.S. representative from Massachusetts.

Born in Fall River, Massachusetts, O'Neil moved with his parents to Boston in 1854. He attended the common schools. He graduated from Quincy Grammar School, Boston. Ten years at the carpenter's trade. He served as member of the Boston School Committee 1874-1877. He served as member of the Massachusetts House of Representatives 1878-1882 and in 1884. He served as member of the Board of Directors for Public institutions from 1880 to 1886 and was chairman of the board the last eighteen months. He served as Boston city clerk in 1887 and 1888.

O'Neil was elected as a Democrat to the Fifty-first, Fifty-second, and Fifty-third Congresses (March 4, 1889 – March 3, 1895). He was an unsuccessful candidate for renomination in 1894. He served as assistant treasurer of the United States at Boston by appointment of President Cleveland in 1895–1899. Organized the Federal Trust Co., of Boston, in 1899 and served as its president until 1922, when it merged into the Federal National Bank, and then served as chairman of the board of directors until his death. He served as member of the board of sinking fund commissioners in 1899–1909. He served as delegate to the Democratic National Convention in 1916. He died in Boston, Massachusetts, on February 19, 1935, and was interred in Holyhood Cemetery, Brookline, Massachusetts.

He was an unsuccessful candidate in the 1925 Boston mayoral election.

== See also ==
- 1878 Massachusetts legislature

Party political offices
Preceded by Matthew Hale	Democratic nominee for Lieutenant Governor of Massachusetts; 1918	Succeeded by John F. J. Herbert
U.S. House of Representatives
Preceded by Leopold Morse	Member of the U.S. House of Representatives from Massachusetts's 4th congressional district March 4, 1889 – March 3, 1893	Succeeded by Lewis D. Apsley
Preceded by George F. Williams	Member of the U.S. House of Representatives from Massachusetts's 9th congressional district March 4, 1893 – March 3, 1895	Succeeded by John F. Fitzgerald
