= Theodore A. Glynn =

American politician (1881-1950)

- portrait photograph of Glynn, circa 1923

Commissioner of the Boston Fire Department
- In office 1922–1926
- Mayor: James M. Curley
- Preceded by: John R. Murphy
- Succeeded by: Eugene Hultman

Member of the Massachusetts House of Representatives
- In office 1906

Member of the Boston Common Council
- In office 1903

Personal details
- Born: November 8, 1881 Roxbury
- Died: February 6, 1950 (aged 63) Roxbury
- Party: Democratic

Theodore A. Glynn (November 8, 1881 – February 6, 1950) was an American politician who served as clerk of the Roxbury District Court and commissioner of the Boston Fire Department. He was a candidate for mayor of Boston in 1925.

== Early life ==
Glynn was born on November 8, 1881, in Boston's Roxbury neighborhood. His parents died when he was young and he began working as a grocery store delivery boy after graduating from grammar school. He later opened his own market. He then worked for the Cudahy Packing Company, where he rose to the position of general manager. In 1906 he married Anna Cooney. They had two children, one of whom, Theodore A. Glynn Jr. served as a state representative and state court judge. Anna Glynn died in 1936.

== Political career ==
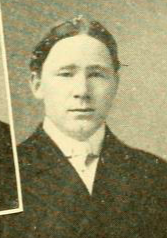
1906 portrait photograph of Conlin

portrait photograph of Glynn, circa 1922

In 1903, the 21-year-old Glynn was elected to the Boston Common Council. In 1905 he defeated former state senator Thomas F. Curley a seat in the Massachusetts House of Representatives. Curley's defeat was a setback for the Boston Tammany Club, run by Thomas F. Curley and James Michael Curley, however Glynn joined the organization a few years later and became its president. Glynn managed James Michael Curley's campaigns in the 1914, 1917, and 1921 mayoral elections. On July 29, 1922, he was appointed Boston Fire Commissioner by Mayor Curley. Curley was ineligible to run in 1925 and Glynn ran to succeed him. Glynn finished second in the ten-candidate race. A large number of votes were split between Glynn the other Democratic candidates, which resulted in the election of Republican Malcolm Nichols. Nichols replaced Glynn as fire commissioner in 1926. Glynn was a candidate for mayor again in 1929, however he dropped out of the race and backed James Michael Curley. In April 1932, Curley appointed Glynn to the position of street commissioner. In 1934, Curley, who had become governor, named Glynn clerk of the Roxbury District Court. Glynn held this position until his death on February 6, 1950.
