= Timilty =

Timilty is a surname.

Notable people with this surname include:

- James E. Timilty, American politician
- James P. Timilty (1865-1921), American politician
- Joseph F. Timilty (police commissioner) (1894-1980), American politician
- Joseph F. Timilty (state senator) (1938-2017), American politician
- Kelly Timilty (1962-2012), American politician
- Walter Timilty (born 1969), American politician
