= List of United States political families (T) =

The following is an alphabetical list of political families in the United States whose last name begins with T.

== The Tabers ==
- Thomas Taber II (1785–1862), U.S. Representative from New York 1828–29. Father of Stephen Taber.
  - Stephen Taber (1821–1886), U.S. Representative from New York 1865–69. Son of Thomas Taber II.

== The Tabors ==
- George Tabor (1862–1939), member of the Iowa Senate 1929–1933. Father of Howard Tabor.
  - Howard Tabor (1893–1968), member of the Iowa House of Representatives 1959–65 and Iowa Senate 1965–67. Son of George Tabor.

== The Tallmadges ==
- Nathaniel P. Tallmadge (1795–1864), New York Assemblyman 1828–30, New York State Senator 1830–33, U.S. Senator from New York 1833–44, Governor of the Wisconsin Territory 1844–45. Father of Isaac S. Tallmadge.
  - Isaac S. Tallmadge, Wisconsin State Assemblyman 1853–54. Son of Nathaniel P. Tallmadge.

== The Talmadges ==
- Eugene Talmadge (1884–1946), governor of Georgia, 1933–37 and 1941–43.
  - Herman Talmadge (1913–2002), governor of Georgia 1947 and 1948–55; U.S. Senator from Georgia, 1957–81; son of Eugene Talmadge.

== The Tamms ==
- Edward Allen Tamm (1906–1985), Judge of the United States District Court for the District of Columbia 1949–65, Judge of the United States Court of Appeals for the District of Columbia Circuit 1965–85.
- Quinn Tamm (1910–1986), Assistant Director for the Federal Bureau of Investigation. Brother of Edward Allen Tamm.

== The Tamposis, Goodlanders, and Sullivans ==
- Elizabeth M. Tamposi (born 1955), member of the New Hampshire House of Representatives, 1979-1986; candidate for the U.S. House of Representatives from New Hampshire, 1988; 10th Assistant Secretary of State for Consular Affairs, 1989-1992.
  - Maggie Goodlander (born 1986), U.S. Deputy Assistant Attorney General for the Antitrust Division, 2022-2024; U.S. Representative from New Hampshire, 2025–present. Daughter of Elizabeth M. Tamposi, wife of Jake Sullivan.
  - Jake Sullivan (born 1976), 26th Director of Policy Planning, 2011-2013; National Security Advisor to the Vice President, 2013-2014; 28th United States National Security Advisor, 2021-2025. Husband of Maggie Goodlander, son-in-law of Elizabeth M. Tamposi.

== The Tafts, Lippitts, and Chafees ==
See Taft-Lippitt-Chafee family political line

== The Tarsneys and Weadocks ==
- John Charles Tarsney (1845–1920), Attorney of Kansas City, Missouri 1874–75; U.S. Representative from Missouri 1889–95; Justice of the Oklahoma Territory Supreme Court 1896–99. Brother of Timothy E. Tarsney.
- Timothy E. Tarsney (1849–1909), candidate for U.S. Representative from Michigan 1880, delegate to the Democratic National Convention 1884, U.S. Representative from Michigan 1885–89. Brother of John Charles Tarsney.
- Thomas A.E. Weadock (1850–1938), Prosecuting Attorney of Bay County, Michigan 1877–78; Chairman of the Michigan Democratic Convention 1883 1894; Mayor of Bay City, Michigan 1883–85; U.S. Representative from Michigan 1891–95; delegate to the Democratic National Convention 1896; candidate for Judge of Michigan Supreme Court 1904; Justice of the Michigan Supreme Court. Brother-in-law of John Charles Tarsney and Timothy E. Tarsney.

NOTE: Thomas A.E. Weadock was also brother of Saginaw, Michigan Mayor George W. Weadock; uncle of Michigan State Senator G. Leo Weadock; and granduncle of Michigan State Senator George W. Weadock II.

== The Taskers and Ogles ==
- Benjamin Tasker Sr. (1690–1768), Maryland Colony House Delegate 1715–17 1720–22, Maryland Colony Senator 1722–66 1768, Maryland Colony Governor's Councilman 1722–68, Annapolis, Maryland Alderman 1720 1754–66; Mayor of Annapolis, Maryland 1721–22 1726–27 1747–48 1750–53 1756–57; Maryland Colony Councilman; acting Governor of Maryland Colony 1753. Father of Benjamin Tasker Jr.
  - Benjamin Tasker Jr. (1720–1760), Governor of Maryland Colony 1752–53, Mayor of Annapolis, Maryland 1754–55. Son of Benjamin Tasker Sr.
  - Samuel Ogle (1694–1752), Governor of Maryland Colony. Son-in-law of Benjamin Tasker Sr.
    - Benjamin Ogle (1749–1809), Maryland Colony Councilman, Governor of Maryland 1798–1801. Son of Samuel Ogle.

== The Tauzins ==
- William J. Tauzin II (born 1943), Louisiana State Representative 1972–80, U.S. Representative from Louisiana 1980–2005. Father of William J. Tauzin III.
  - Billy Tauzin III (born 1973), candidate for U.S. Representative from Louisiana 2004. Son of William J. Tauzin II.

== The Tayloes of Mount Airy ==
- William Tayloe (the immigrant), was a Burgess for York County, Virginia in March 1642–43, and Nov. 1647. As Maj. William Tayloe, he was present as a member of the council, 6 Nov. 1651, but lost his seat on the surrender of Virginia to the parliament. He was, however, again elected a councilor, 30 April 1652, and once more on 31 March 1654–55. He was a justice of York County since 1647.
  - William Tayloe (the nephew), nephew of William Tayloe (the immigrant). In 1692 Tayloe was one of the first justices of Richmond County (Richmond Co. was created from Old Rappahannock Co. in 1692), and in 1704, as "Colonel and Commander in Chief" of the militia of that county, subdued an attempted uprising of the Indians. Col. Tayloe was a Burgess for Richmond county at the sessions of December 1700; August 1701; May 1702; June 1702, and April 1706. On 19 May 1703, Col. William Tayloe, Col. George Taylor, Mr. Samuel Peachey, Capt. John Deane, and Capt. John Tarpley were justices of Richmond Co., VA.
    - John Tayloe I son of William Tayloe (the nephew). He was a member of the House of Burgesses of Virginia in 1710, 1728 and 1730.
      - John Tayloe II was an influential member of the King's Council, under Lord Dunmore, and of the first Republic Council, under Governor Patrick Henry. Tayloe was a member of the House of Burgesses of Virginia 1774.
        - John Tayloe III Captain of Dragoons, he went to Western Pennsylvania, to help put down the Whiskey Rebellion. In 1799, he was appointed Major of Light Dragoons, U. S. A. by President John Adams. When General Washington wrote to Tayloe a warm letter of congratulation, Tayloe hesitated to accept the commission as he had just been elected as a Federalist to the Senate of Virginia, and he feared, as he wrote to Washington, that if he resigned his seat, the place would be filled by an opponent of the administration. On 12 February 1799, Washington replied that he was inclined to believe his civil service would be more important than military service. Tayloe served in the Virginia House of Delegates and the Senate of Virginia, as Delegate and Senator for a combined 9 years. On the breaking out of the War of 1812, Tayloe was made commander of the cavalry of the District of Columbia and saw active service.
          - Benjamin Ogle Tayloe studied law under United States Attorney General Richard Rush. When Rush was appointed Minister to Great Britain in 1817, Tayloe was an observer at the Congress of Aix-la-Chapelle in 1818. He traveled to Paris in the spring of 1819, where Minister to France Albert Gallatin introduced him to [King Louis XVIII and Talleyrand.
          - Edward Thornton Tayloe was private secretary to Mr. Joel Roberts Poinsett of South Carolina, Minister of Mexico. He was skilled in French, Italian and Spanish. In 1828 he became Secretary of Legation to William Henry Harrison, first Minister to Colombia. Since 1825 he had flooded the fledgling Department of State with recommendations from influential friends, including Poinsett, seeking his appointment to diplomatic service. Only six weeks after his return from Mexico, he was appointed by President John Quincy Adams. Before the party left for Bogota, President Adams was defeated by Andrew Jackson. Gen. Harrison and Edward Tayloe proceeded to Colombia, hoping the new administration would leave them in place. While they awaited the ship, Gen. Cordoba seized the opportunity of Simon Bolivar's absence to stage a revolt in Colombia. Bolivar's second in command blamed the Cordoba affair on the meddling of Harrison and Tayloe. Then an American adventurer in the employ of Bolivar's government saw an opportunity for his own advancement and spread the tale that Harrison and Tayloe had conspired with Cordoba in his attempted coup. A mutual friend of Harrison and Tayloe was imprisoned without charges or trial, and they returned to Virginia. Simon Bolivar had disappointed him with his aggression against Peru and his dictatorial tendencies, and Washington politics had topped everything off. In 1830 he became a County Magistrate, in King George County, Virginia. In 1840 he won the election with William Henry Harrison, but President Harrison died. Before his death, President Harrison confided to Benjamin Ogle Tayloe that he intended naming Edward Tayloe to the post of Treasurer of the United States. One account even states that Mr. Harrison caught his death while walking in the rain from St. John's Church to the Benjamin Ogle Tayloe House with that information.
            - William Tayloe Murphy Sr., Delegate in the Virginia House and Virginia State Treasurer. President of the Northern Neck State Bank, now Atlantic Union Bancshares. He was the great-grandson of Edward Thornton Tayloe, grandson of Edward Poinsett Tayloe and son of Robert Murphy.
              - W. Tayloe Murphy Jr. is a Virginia lawyer and Democratic politician who served part-time as a member of the Virginia House of Delegates, representing District 99 (his native Northern Neck) between 1982 and 2000, as well as Secretary of Natural Resources under Governor Mark Warner from 2002–2006.

== The Taylors ==
- J. Alfred Taylor (1878–1956), West Virginia House Delegate 1917–18 1921–22 1931–32 1937–38, U.S. Representative from West Virginia 1923–27, candidate for Governor of West Virginia 1928, candidate for the Democratic nomination for U.S. Senate from West Virginia 1934. Father of J. Alfred Taylor Jr.
  - J. Alfred Taylor Jr., West Virginia House Delegate 1943–44, West Virginia State Senator 1949–56. Son of J. Alfred Taylor.

== The Taylors of Arkansas ==
- Samuel M. Taylor (1852–1921), Arkansas State Representative 1879–80, delegate to the Democratic National Convention 1896, U.S. Representative from Arkansas 1913–21. Father of Chester William Taylor.
  - Chester W. Taylor (1883–1931), U.S. Representative from Arkansas 1921–23. Son of Samuel M. Taylor.

== The Taylors of Louisiana ==
- Zachary Taylor (1784–1850), President of the United States 1849–50. Father of Richard Taylor, father-in-law of Jefferson Davis.
  - Richard Taylor (1826–1879), Louisiana State Senator 1855–61, delegate to the 1860 Democratic National Convention. Son of Zachary Taylor.
  - Jefferson Davis, U.S. Representative from Mississippi 1845–46 1857–61, U.S. Senator from Mississippi 1847–51, candidate for Governor of Mississippi, 1851, U.S. Secretary of War 1853–57, President of the Confederate States of America. Son-in-law of Zachary Taylor.

NOTE: Zachary Taylor was also second cousin of U.S. President James Madison, second cousin once removed of U.S. Senator Richard Henry Lee, third cousin of U.S. Attorney General Charles Lee and U.S. Representatives Henry Lee and Richard Bland Lee, granduncle of Kentucky State Senator Edmund H. Taylor Jr., third cousin twice removed of Virginia Governor Fitzhugh Lee, first cousin thrice removed of Missouri Governor Elliot Woolfolk Major, second cousin thrice removed of Missouri Legislator Edgar Bailey Woolfolk, and an ancestor of Florida State Representative Victor Crist. Jefferson Davis was also grandson-in-law of New Jersey Governor Richard Howell and granduncle of U.S. Representative Jefferson Davis Brodhead. Senate Minority Leader Hugh Scott was related to the Taylor family as his great-grandmother was the niece of President Zachary Taylor.

== The Tazewells ==
- Henry Tazewell (1753–1799), member of the Virginia Colony House of Burgesses 1775, delegate to the Virginia Constitutional Convention 1775 1776, Virginia Assemblyman 1778–85, Justice of the Virginia Supreme Court 1785–89, Chief Justice of the Virginia Supreme Court 1789–93, Judge of the High Court of Appeals 1793, U.S. Senator from Virginia 1794–99. Father of Littleton Waller Tazewell.
  - Littleton Waller Tazewell (1774–1860), Virginia House Delegate 1798–1800, U.S. Representative from Virginia 1800–01, Virginia House Delegate 1804–06, Virginia House Delegate 1816–17, U.S. Senator from Virginia 1824–32, delegate to the Virginia Constitutional Convention 1829, Governor of Virginia 1834–36. Son of Henry Tazewell.

== The Telles ==
- Raymond Telles (1915-2013), mayor of El Paso, Texas (1957-1961) and U.S. Ambassador to Costa Rica (1961-1967)
- Richard Telles, county commissioner
  - Raymond Rutherford Telles, El Paso City council member
  - Robert Telles, public administrator of Clark County, Nevada and convicted murderer

== The Tenerowiczes ==
- Rudolph G. Tenerowicz (1890–1963), Mayor of Hamtramck, Michigan 1928–32 1936–38; U.S. Representative from Michigan 1939–43; candidate for U.S. Representative from Michigan 1948 1950 1952 1954. Brother of Anthony C. Tenerowicz.
- Anthony C. Tenerowicz, Mayor of Hamtramck, Michigan 1942. Brother of Rudolph G. Tenerowicz.
- Margaret Tenerowicz, candidate for Republican nomination for U.S. Representative from Michigan 1956, candidate for Michigan State Representative 1966 1968. Wife of Rudolph G. Tenerwoicz.

== The Tenneys ==
- Samuel Tenney (1748–1816), delegate to the New Hampshire Constitutional Convention 1791, Probate Court Judge in New Hampshire 1793–1800, U.S. Representative from New Hampshire 1800–07. Third cousin once removed of Asa Tenney.
- Asa Tenney (1759–1831), Vermont State Representative 1813–18. Third cousin once removed of Samuel Tenney.
  - Abner B.W. Tenney (1795–1873), Vermont State Representative 1832–34 1839–41 1849–50 1856, Vermont State Senator 1836–38, delegate to the Whig Party National Convention 1839. Third cousin twice removed of Samuel Tenney.
  - Horace A. Tenney (1820–1906), President of Madison, Wisconsin 1853–54; state legislator; Greenback Party candidate for U.S. Representative from Wisconsin 1878. Third cousin twice removed of Samuel Tenney.
    - Asa Wentworth Tenney (1833–1897), U.S. Attorney in New York 1877–85, U.S. District Court Judge in New York 1897. Third cousin three times removed of Samuel Tenney.
      - William Richards Castle Jr. (1878–1963), U.S. Ambassador to Japan 1929–30. Fourth cousin once removed of Asa Wentworth Tenney.

NOTE: William Richards Castle Jr. was also son of Kingdom of Hawaii politician William Richards Castle.

== The Tenorios ==
- Pedro Tenorio, Governor of Northern Mariana Islands 1982–90 1998–2002. Distant cousin of Froilan Tenorio.
- Froilan Tenorio, Governor of Northern Marian Islands 1994–98. Distant cousin of Pedro Tenorio.

== The Tenorios of Guam ==
- Ray Tenorio (born 1965), Guam Territorial Legislator 2003–2011, Lieutenant Governor of Guam 2011–2019, candidate for Governor of Guam 2018. Cousin of Josh Tenorio.
- Josh Tenorio, Lieutenant Governor of Guam 2019–present. Cousin of Ray Tenorio.

== The Terrys ==
- William L. Terry (1850–1917), Arkansas State Senator 1878–79, candidate for U.S. Representative from Arkansas 1886, U.S. Representative from Arkansas 1891–1901. Father of David D. Terry.
  - David D. Terry (1881–1963), member of the Little Rock, Arkansas School Board 1929–33; Arkansas State Representative 1933; U.S. Representative from Arkansas 1933–43; candidate for U.S. Senate from Arkansas 1942. Son of William L. Terry.

== The Tharps and Watsons ==
- William Tharp (1803–1865), candidate for Governor of Delaware 1844, Governor of Delaware 1847–51. Grandfather of William T. Watson.
  - William T. Watson (1849–1917), Governor of Delaware 1895–97. Grandson of William Tharp.

== The Thayers ==
- see Thayer family

== The Thibodauxs ==
- Henry S. Thibodaux (1769–1827), Justice of the Peace in Louisiana Territory, Louisiana State Senator 1812–24, acting Governor of Louisiana 1824, candidate for Governor of Louisiana 1827, died during campaign. Father of Bannon Goforth Thibodeaux.
  - Bannon Goforth Thibodeaux (1812–1866), U.S. Representative from Louisiana 1845–49. Son of Henry S. Thibodaux.

== The Thomases ==
- Charles R. Thomas (1827–1891), delegate to the North Carolina Constitutional Convention 1861, North Carolina Secretary of State 1864–65, Judge of the North Carolina Superior Court 1868–70, U.S. Representative from North Carolina 1871–75. Father of Charles R. Thomas.
  - Charles R. Thomas (1861–1931), North Carolina State Representative 1887, Attorney of Craven County, North Carolina 1890–96; U.S. Representative from North Carolina 1899–1911; Judge of the North Carolina Superior Court. Son of Charles R. Thomas.

NOTE: Charles R. Thomas was also son-in-law of North Carolina Supreme Court Chief Justice Thomas Ruffin.

== The Thomases of Texas ==
- Albert Thomas (1898–1966), U.S. Representative from Texas 1937–66.
- Lera Millard Thomas (1900–1993), U.S. Representative from Texas 1966–67. Wife of Albert Thomas.

== The Thompsons of Wisconsin ==
- Tommy Thompson (born 1941), Wisconsin State Assembly 1966–87, Governor of Wisconsin 1987–2001, U.S. Secretary of Health and Human Services 2001–05, candidate for the 2008 Republican nomination for President of the United States, withdrew nomination. Brother of Ed Thompson.
- Ed Thompson (1944–2011), Mayor of Tomah, Wisconsin 2000–05 2008–10; candidate for Governor of Wisconsin 2002; Tomah, Wisconsin Common Council 2005–07; candidate for Wisconsin State Senate 2010. Brother of Tommy Thompson.

== The Thompsons of California and Virginia ==
- Robert A. Thompson (1805–1876), Virginia State Senator 1839–46, U.S. Representative from Virginia 1847–49, delegate to the Democratic National Convention 1852. Father of Thomas Larkin Thompson.
  - Thomas Larkin Thompson (1838–1898), Delegate to the Democratic National Convention 1880 1892, California Secretary of State 1882–86, U.S. Representative from California 1887–89, U.S. Minister to Brazil 1893–97. Son of Robert A. Thompson.

== The Thompsons of Iowa and Pennsylvania ==
- John McCandless Thompson (1829–1903), Pennsylvania State Representative 1859–60, delegate to the Republican National Convention 1868, U.S. Representative from Pennsylvania 1874–75 1877–79. Brother of William George Thompson.
- William George Thompson (1830–1911), Prosecuting Attorney of Linn County, Iowa 1854–56; Iowa State Senator 1856–60; District Attorney in Iowa; Chief Justice of the Idaho Territory Supreme Court 1879; U.S. Representative from Iowa 1879–83; Marion, Iowa Councilman; Iowa State Representative 1885–87; Judge in Iowa 1894–1906. Brother of John McCandless Thompson.

== The Thompsons of Nevada ==
- Bruce Rutherford Thompson (1911–1992), Judge of the United States District Court for the District of Nevada 1963–78.
- Gordon R. Thompson (1918–1995), Associate Justice of the Nevada Supreme Court 1961–81. Brother of Bruce Rutherford Thompson.

== The Thomsons ==
- Edwin Keith Thomson (1919–1960), Wyoming State Representative 1952–54, U.S. Representative from Wyoming 1955–60, Senator-elect from Wyoming 1960.
- Thyra Thomson (1916–2013), Wyoming Secretary of State 1963–87. Wife of Edwin Keith Thomson.

== The Throops and Walterses ==
- Enos T. Throop (1784–1874), Postmaster of Auburn, New York; County Clerk of Cayuga County, New York; U.S. Representative from New York 1815–16; Circuit Court Judge in New York 1823–28; Lieutenant Governor of New York 1829; Governor of New York 1829–32. Relative by marriage of Aaron Walters.
  - Aaron Walters, Chairman of Eden, Fond du Lac County, Wisconsin; Wisconsin State Assemblyman 1857 1872; candidate for the Wisconsin State Assembly 1859; County Superintendent of the Poor of Fond du Lac County, Wisconsin; County Supervisor of Fond du Lac County, Wisconsin; candidate for Sheriff 1867. Relative by marriage of Enos T. Throop.

== The Thrustons ==
- Buckner Thruston (1763–1845), U.S Senator from Kentucky, 1805–09, Judge of the United States Circuit Court of the District of Columbia 1809–45.
  - Charles Mynn Thruston (1798–1873), Mayor of Cumberland, Maryland 1861–62. Son of Buckner Thruston.

== The Thurmans ==
- Karen Thurman (born 1951), Dunnellon, Florida Councilwoman 1974–83; Mayor of Dunnellon, Florida 1979–81; Florida State Senator 1983–93; U.S. Representative from Florida 1993–2003; delegate to the Democratic National Convention 2000 2008; Chairwoman of the Florida Democratic Party. Mother of McLin Thurman.
  - McLin Thurman, candidate for Florida State Representative 2006. Son of Karen Thurman.

== The Thurstons ==
- Jeremiah Thurston, Lieutenant Governor of Rhode Island 1816–17. Father of Benjamin B. Thurston.
  - Benjamin B. Thurston (1804–1886), Lieutenant Governor of Rhode Island 1837–38, U.S. Representative from Rhode Island 1847–49 1851–57, member of the Rhode Island Legislature. Son of Jeremiah Thurston.

== The Tierneys ==
- William L. Tierney (1876–1958), U.S. Representative from Connecticut 1931–33. Father of William L. Tierney Jr.
  - William L. Tiereney Jr. (1907–1989), Judge of the Connecticut Superior Court 1968–77. Son of William L. Tierney.

NOTE: William L. Tierney was also first cousin of Margaret Elizabeth Tierney, who was sister-in-law of Holyoke, Massachusetts Mayor James J. Curran.

== The Tiffins and Worthingtons ==
- Edward Tiffin (1766–1829), member of the Northwest Territory Legislature 1799, delegate to the Ohio Constitutional Convention 1802, Governor of Ohio 1803–07, U.S. Senator from Ohio 1807–09, Ohio State Representative 1809–10. Brother-in-law of Thomas Worthington.
- Thomas Worthington (1773–1827), delegate to the Ohio Constitutional Convention 1802, U.S. Senator from Ohio 1803–07 1810–14, Ohio State Representative 1807 1821–22, candidate for Governor of Ohio 1808 1810, Governor of Ohio 1814–18. Brother-in-law of Edward Tiffin.

== The Tilghmans ==
- Matthew Tilghman (1718–1790), delegate to the Continental Congress from 1774–76, President of the Maryland State Senate 1780 1782–83.
  - William Tilghman (1756–1827), Chief Judge of the United States Circuit Court for the Third Circuit 1801–02, Chief Justice of the Supreme Court of Pennsylvania 1806–27. Nephew of Matthew Tilghman.

== The Tillinghasts ==
- Thomas Tillinghast (1742–1821), Rhode Island Colony Representative 1772–73, Rhode Island 1778–80, Judge of the Rhode Island Court of Common Pleas 1779, Justice of the Rhode Island Supreme Court 1780–97, U.S. Representative from Rhode Island 1797–99 1801–03. Cousin of Joseph L. Tillinghast.
- Joseph L. Tillinghast (1791–1844), Rhode Island State Representative 1826–33, U.S. Representative from Rhode Island 1837–43. Cousin of Thomas Tillinghast.

== The Tillises ==
- Thom Tillis (born 1960), U.S. Senator from North Carolina from 2015.
- Rick Tillis (born 1963), Tennessee state representative from 2016. Brother of Thom Tillis.

== The Tillmans ==
- George D. Tillman (1826–1902), South Carolina State Representative 1854–55 1864, delegate to the South Carolina Constitutional Convention 1865 1895, candidate for U.S. Representative from South Carolina 1876, U.S. Representative from South Carolina 1879–82 1883–93, candidate for Governor of South Carolina 1898. Brother of Benjamin Tillman.
- Benjamin Tillman (1847–1918), Governor of South Carolina 1890–94, delegate to the South Carolina Constitutional Convention 1895, U.S. Senator from South Carolina 1895–1918. Brother of George D. Tillman.

== The Timiltys ==
- James P. Timilty (1865–1921), member of the Massachusetts Senate.
  - Joseph F. Timilty (1894–1980), Boston Police Commissioner from 1936 to 1943. Candidate for Mayor of Boston in 1951. Son of James P. Timilty.
    - Joseph F. Timilty (1938–2017), member of the Boston City Council from 1967 to 1971, member of the Massachusetts Senate from 1972 to 1985. Candidate for Mayor of Boston in 1971, 1975, and 1979. Grandson of James P. Timilty.
      - James E. Timilty, Massachusetts State Senator, 2005–2017. Son of Joseph F. Timilty.
      - Kelly Timilty (1962–2012), member of the Massachusetts Governor's Council, 1994–2012. Daughter of Joseph F. Timilty.
    - Walter F. Timilty Sr., Clerk of Courts in Norfolk County, Massachusetts. Grandson of James P. Timilty.
      - Walter Timilty Jr. (born 1969), member of the Massachusetts House of Representatives from 1995 to 2016; member of the Massachusetts Senate since 2016. Son of Walter F. Timilty Sr.

== The Timmermans ==
- George Bell Timmerman Sr. (1881–1966), Judge of the United States District Court for the Eastern District of South Carolina and the United States District Court for the Western District of South Carolina 1942–62.
  - George Bell Timmerman Jr. (1912–1994), Lieutenant Governor of South Carolina 1947–55, Governor of South Carolina 1955–59. Son of George Bell Timmerman Sr.

== The Todds of Michigan ==
- Albert M. Todd (1850–1931), candidate for Governor of Michigan 1894, U.S. Representative from Michigan 1897–99, candidate for Mayor of Kalamazoo, Michigan 1900. Father of Albert J. Todd and Paul H. Todd.
  - Albert J. Todd, Mayor of Kalamazoo, Michigan 1919–20. Son of Albert M. Todd.
  - Paul H. Todd, candidate for Michigan State Representative 1932, candidate for U.S. Representative from Michigan 1934, Mayor of Kalamazoo, Michigan 1935–37 1949–51. Son of Albert M. Todd.
    - Paul H. Todd Jr. (1921–2008), candidate for U.S. Representative from Michigan 1962 1974, U.S. Representative from Michigan 1965–67. Son of Paul H. Todd.

== The Todds of New Jersey ==
- John R. Todd (1868–1945), delegate to the Republican National Convention 1928 1932 1940. Father of Webster B. Todd.
- Reeve Schley (1881–1960), delegate to the Republican National Convention 1936 1940 1944. Father of Eleanor Schley Todd.
- Kate Prentice Schley (1885–1970), delegate to the Republican National Convention 1932, Republican National Committeewoman 1944–49. Wife of Reeve Schley and mother of Eleanor Schley Todd.
  - Webster B. Todd (1900–1989), Treasurer of the New Jersey Republican Party 1943, Chairman of the New Jersey Republican Party 1961–69 1974–77, delegate to the Republican National Convention 1972. Son of John R. Todd.
  - Eleanor Schley Todd (1912–1990), delegate to the Republican National Convention 1952, Republican National Committeewoman 1953–56 1959–61, Vice Chairwoman of the Republican National Committee 1956–59. Wife of Webster B. Todd.
    - Christine Todd Whitman (born 1946), candidate for U.S. Senate from New Jersey 1990, Governor of New Jersey 1994–2001, Administrator of the U.S. Environmental Protection Agency 2001–03. Daughter of Webster B. Todd and Eleanor Schley Todd.
      - Kate Whitman, candidate for Republican nomination for U.S. Representative from New Jersey 2008. Daughter of Christine Whitman.

NOTE: Christine Whitman is also granddaughter-in-law of New York Governor Charles S. Whitman.

== The Todds/Woodses of Pennsylvania ==
- James Todd (1786–1863), state representative 1819–29, Pennsylvania Attorney General 1835–38. Father (by his second wife) of Moses Hampton Todd. Great-grandfather (by his first wife) of Mary Todd Marchand, wife of Cyrus E. Woods.
  - Moses Hampton Todd (1845–1935), Pennsylvania Attorney General 1907–11.
    - Cyrus E. Woods (1861–1938), Pennsylvania Attorney General 1929–30, state Senator 1901–07 and Secretary of State 1915–21, U. S. Envoy to Portugal 1912–13, Ambassador to Spain 1921–23 and Japan 1923–24.

== The Tompkinses of New York ==
- Arthur S. Tompkins (1865–1938), U.S. Representative from New York 1899–1903, Justice of NY Supreme Court 1906–1934, Appellate Division of the Supreme Court of New York 1930–36.
- Caleb Tompkins (1759–1846), U.S. Representative from New York 1817–21. Brother of Daniel D. Tompkins. Justice of the Westchester County Court.
- Daniel D. Tompkins (1774–1825), delegate to the 1801 New York Constitutional Convention, New York Assemblyman 1803, U.S. Representative elect 1803, Justice of the New York Supreme Court 1804–07, Governor of New York 1807–17, Vice President of the United States 1807–25. Brother of Caleb Tompkins.
- Lt. Frank Gary Tompkins (1874-1956), Member of the House of Representatives South Carolina 1906-1908, great-grandson of Col. James Stephen Tompkins.
- Col. James Stephen Tompkins, (1798-1864), Member of the House of Representatives South Carolina 1834-38, 1840–42, and 1858–60. The Colonel's grandfather, Stephen B. Tompkins (1730-1801), is the brother of Jonathan Griffin Tompkins and served as a Captain at the Battle of Lindley's Mill in the Revolutionary War.
- Jonathan Griffin Tompkins (1736–1823), Served in the 3rd and 4th provisional Congresses, NY State Legislature from 1780–1792, father of Governor and Vice President Daniel D. Tompkins. "First Judge" of the Court of Common Pleas from 1794 to 1797. Adopting member of the Declaration of Independence and first New York Constitution. Also one of the first regents of the University of the State of New York
- Minthorne Tompkins (1807–1881), member of the New York State Assembly 1833–34, New York State Senate, 1840–41. Son of Daniel D. Tompkins.
- Minthorne Dyckman Tompkins (1841–1904) member of the Connecticut State Assembly, 1885–1886, first FDNY member to receive its highest honor, the James Gordon Bennett Medal of Valor.
- Frost Horton (1806–1880), member of the New York State Assembly 1858. Husband of Phoebe Tompkins, a cousin of Daniel D. Tompkins.

== The Tompkinses of Ohio ==
- Cydnor B. Tompkins (1810–1862), Prosecuting Attorney of Morgan County, Ohio 1848–51; delegate to the Ohio Republican Committee 1855; U.S. Representative from Ohio 1857–61. Father of Emmett Tompkins.
  - Emmett Tompkins (1853–1917), Solicitor of Athens, Ohio 1876–77; Mayor of Athens, Ohio 1877–79; Prosecuting Attorney of Athens County, Ohio 1879; delegate to the Ohio Republican Convention 1879 1881 1883; Ohio State Representative 1886–90; U.S. Representative from Ohio 1901–03. Son of Cydnor B. Tompkins.

NOTE: Emmett Tompkins was also grandson-in-law of U.S. Representative John Welch.

== The Townses ==
- Edolphus Towns (born 1934), U.S. Representative from New York 1983–2013. Father of Darryl Towns.
  - Darryl Towns (born 1961), New York Assemblyman 1993–2011. Son of Edolphus Towns.

== The Tracys ==
- Phineas L. Tracy (1786–1786), U.S. Representative from New York 1827–33, Judge of Genesee County, New York Court 1841–46. Brother of Albert H. Tracy.
- Albert H. Tracy (1793–1859), U.S. Representative from New York 1819–25, New York State Senator 1830–37, candidate for U.S. Senate from New York 1839. Brother of Phineas L. Tracy.

== The Traylors ==
- Robert B. Traylor (1816–1893), member of the Georgia legislature. Father of John H. Traylor.
  - John H. Traylor (1839–1925), Texas State Representative, Texas State Senator, Mayor of Dallas, Texas 1898–1900. Son of Robert B. Traylor.

== The Treens ==
- David C. Treen (1928–2009), governor of Louisiana 1980–84; U.S. representative from Louisiana's 3rd congressional district 1973–80, brother of John S. Treen
- John S. Treen (born 1926), Republican candidate for the Louisiana House in 1989; defeated by David Duke, brother of David C. Treen

== The Tribbitts and Webbs ==
- E. Sherman Webb, Delaware State Representative. Father-in-law of Sherman W. Tribbitt.
  - Sherman W. Tribbitt (1922–2010), Delaware State Representative 1957–64 1971–72, Lieutenant Governor of Delaware 1965–69, Governor of Delaware 1973–77. Son-in-law of E. Sherman Webb.

== The Triggs, Doniphans, Logans, and Thortons ==
- Stephen Trigg (1744–1782), Virginia House Delegate 1775 1778 1780–81. Brother of John Johns Trigg and Abram Trigg.
- John Johns Trigg (1748–1804), member of the Virginia Legislature 1784, U.S. Representative from Virginia 1797–1804. Brother of Stephen Trigg and Abram Trigg.
- Abram Trigg, Virginia State Court Judge, U.S. Representative from Virginia 1797–1809. Brother of Stephen Trigg and John Johns Trigg.
  - John Thorton (1786–1847), Missouri State Representative 1824–32 1836. Grandson-in-law of John Johns Trigg.
    - Stephen T. Logan (1800–1880), Attorney of Barren County, Kentucky 1822–32; Circuit Court Judge in Illinois 1835–40; Illinois State Representative 1843–47 1855–56; delegate to the Illinois Constitutional Convention 1847; delegate to the Republican National Convention 1860. Grandson of Stephen Trigg.
    - Alexander William Doniphan (1808–1887), member of the Mississippi Legislature 1836 1840 1854, delegate to the Democratic National Convention 1876. Son-in-law of John Thorton.

== The Tsongases ==
- Paul Tsongas (1941–1997), Representative and Senator from Massachusetts and Presidential candidate in 1992
- Niki Tsongas (born 1946), wife of Paul, Representative from Massachusetts (2007–2019)
- Thaleia Tsongas (born 1941), delegate to the Democratic National Convention 2008. Sister of Paul Tsongas.

== The Trumbulls ==
- Jonathan Trumbull (1710–1785), Deputy Governor of Connecticut 1766–69, Governor of Connecticut 1769–84. Father of Joseph Trumbull, Jonathan Trumbull Jr.; and David Trumbull.
  - Joseph Trumbull (1737–1778), Delegate to the Continental Congress from Connecticut 1774. Son of Jonathan Trumbull.
  - Jonathan Trumbull Jr. (1740–1809), U.S. Representative from Connecticut 1789–95, Speaker of the U.S. House of Representatives 1791–93, U.S. Senator from Connecticut 1795–96, Lieutenant Governor of Connecticut 1796–97, Governor of Connecticut 1797–1809. Son of Jonathan Trumbull.
  - David Trumbull (1751–1822), Connecticut State Representative. Son of Jonathan Trumbull.
    - Joseph Trumbull (1782–1861), member of the Connecticut Legislature, U.S. Representative from Connecticut 1834–35 1839–43, Governor of Connecticut 1849–50. Son of David Trumbull.

== The Trumps ==
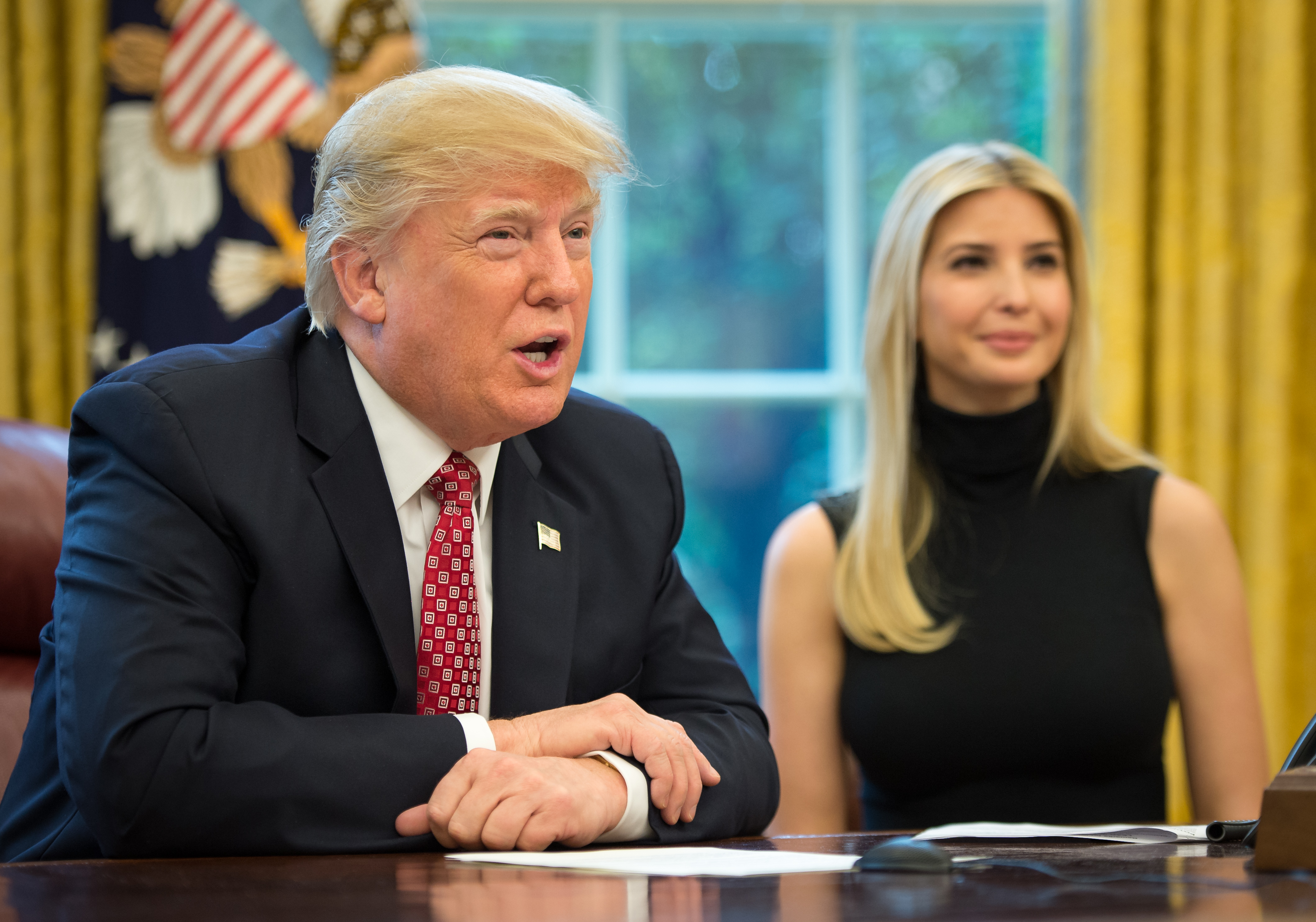
45th U.S. President Donald Trump and his daughter/advisor Ivanka

See Family of Donald Trump

- Donald John Trump Sr.
  - 45th President of the United States (20 January 2017 – 20 January 2021)
  - 47th President of the United States (20 January 2025 – Present)
- Ivanka Marie Trump
  - Trump's daughter and Senior Advisor to the President (29 March 2017 – 20 January 2021)
- Jared Kushner
  - Trump's son-in-law and Advisor to the President/Director of the Office of American Innovation (20 January 2017 – 20 January 2021)
- Lara Trump
  - Trump's daughter-in-law and Co-Chair of the RNC (8 March 2024 – 17 January 2025)
- Maryanne Trump Barry
  - Trump's sister and former Judge of the United States District Court for the District of New Jersey (7 October 1983 – 25 October 1999)
  - Judge of the United States Court of Appeals for the Third Circuit (22 September 1999 – 30 June 2011)
  - Senior Judge of the United States Court of Appeals for the Third Circuit (30 June 2011 – 11 February 2019)

== The Tuckers ==
- Walter R. Tucker Jr. (1924–1990), candidate for Mayor Compton, California 1977; Mayor of Compton, California 1981–90. Father of Walter R. Tucker III.
  - Walter R. Tucker III (born 1957), Mayor of Compton, California 1991–92; U.S. Representative from California 1993–95. Son of Walter R. Tucker Jr.

== The Tuckers of Virginia ==
- Thomas Tudor Tucker (1745–1828), South Carolina Assemblyman 1776 1782–83 1785 1787–88, Delegate to the Continental Congress from South Carolina 1787–88, U.S. Representative from South Carolina 1789–93, Treasurer of the United States 1801–28. Uncle of Henry St. George Tucker.
- St. George Tucker, (1752–1827), Justice of the Virginia Supreme Court 1804–11, Judge of the United States District Court for the District of Virginia 1813–19, Judge of the United States District Court for the Eastern District of Virginia 1819–25. Brother of Thomas Tudor Tucker.
  - Henry St. George Tucker (1780–1848), U.S. Representative from Virginia 1815–19, Virginia State Senator 1819–23, Judicial District Chancellor in Virginia 1824–31. Son of St. George Tucker, nephew of Thomas Tudor Tucker.
  - George Tucker (1775–1861), Commonwealth Attorney of Pittsylvania County, Virginia; Virginia House Delegate; U.S. Representative from Virginia 1819–25. Cousin of Henry St. George Tucker.
  - John Randolph (1773–1833), U.S. Representative from Virginia 1799–1813 1815–17 1819–25 1827–29 1833, U.S. Senator from Virginia 1825–27, U.S. Minister to Russia 1830. Brother of Henry St. George Tucker.
    - John Randolph Tucker (1823–1897), Attorney General of Virginia 1857–65, U.S. Representative from Virginia 1875–87. Son of Henry St. George Tucker.
      - Henry St. George Tucker III (1853–1932), U.S. Representative from Virginia 1889–97 1922–32. Son of John Randolph Tucker.

NOTE: John Randolph was also nephew of U.S. Representative Theodorick Bland, cousin of U.S. Secretary of State John Marshall, and second cousin of U.S. Attorney General Edmund Jennings Randolph.

== The Turners ==
- Oscar Turner (1825–1896), Kentucky Commonwealth Attorney 1851–55, Kentucky State Senator 1867–71, U.S. Representative from Kentucky 1879–85. Father of Oscar Turner.
  - Oscar Turner (1867–1902), U.S. Representative from Kentucky 1899–1901. Son of Oscar Turner.

== The Turners of Michigan ==
- James M. Turner (1850–1896), Michigan State Representative 1877–78, Mayor of Lansing, Michigan 1889 1895; candidate for Governor of Michigan 1890. Father of James Turner.
  - James Turner, Michigan Republican Committeeman. Son of James M. Turner.

== The Turners of North Carolina ==
- James Turner (1766–1824), member of the North Carolina House of Commons 1797–1800, North Carolina State Senator 1801–02, Governor of North Carolina 1802–05, U.S. Senator from North Carolina 1805–16. Father of Daniel Turner.
  - Daniel Turner (1796–1860), member of the North Carolina House of Commons 1819–23, U.S. Representative from North Carolina 1827–29. Son of James Turner.

== The Tuthills ==
- Selah Tuthill (1771–1821), New York Assemblyman 1805 1820, U.S. Representative from New York 1821. Uncle of Joseph H. Tuthill.
  - Joseph H. Tuthill (1811–1877), member of the Ulster County, New York Board of Supervisors 1842–43 1861–62 1865–70; Clerk of Ulster County, New York 1843–47; candidate for U.S. Representative from New York 1866; U.S. Representative from New York 1871–73. Nephew of Selah Tuthill.

== The Tydingses ==
- Millard Tydings (1890–1961), Maryland House Delegate 1916–22, Maryland State Senator 1923–24, U.S. Representative from Maryland 1923–27, U.S. Senator from Maryland 1927–51. Father of Joseph Tydings.
  - Joseph Tydings (1928–2018), Maryland House Delegate 1955–61, U.S. Attorney of Maryland 1961–63, U.S. Senator from Maryland 1965–71. Son of Millard Tydings.

== The Tylers ==
- John Tyler Sr. (1747–1813), Governor of Virginia 1808–11, Judge of the United States District Court for the District of Virginia 1811–13.
  - John Tyler (1790–1862), U.S. Representative from Virginia 1816–21, Governor of Virginia 1825–27, U.S. Senator from Virginia 1827–1836, Vice President of the United States 1841, President of the United States 1841–45, son of John Tyler Sr.
    - David Gardiner Tyler (1846–1927), U.S. Congressman from Virginia 1893–97, son of John Tyler
    - John Tyler Jr. (1819-1896), army colonel, attorney, politician, and writer, son of John Tyler
    - Lyon Gardiner Tyler (1853–1935), historian and educator, son of John Tyler
      - Harrison Ruffin Tyler (1928-2025), chemical engineer, businessperson, and preservationist, son of Lyon Gardiner Tyler
