= Senator Timilty =

Senator Timility may refer to:

- James E. Timilty (fl. 2000s–2010s), Massachusetts State Senate
- James P. Timilty (1865–1921), Massachusetts State Senate
- Joseph F. Timilty (state senator) (1938–2017), Massachusetts State Senate
- Walter Timilty (born 1969), Massachusetts State Senate
