= Joseph Timilty =

Joseph Timilty may refer to:

- Joseph F. Timilty (police commissioner) (1894–1980), Boston police commissioner, 1936–1943
- Joseph F. Timilty (state senator) (1938–2017), member of the Boston City Council from 1967 to 1971 and the Massachusetts Senate from 1972 to 1985
