= James Timilty =

James Timilty may refer to:

- James E. Timilty (fl. 2005–17), Massachusetts state senator
- James P. Timilty (1865–1921), Massachusetts state senator
