= Walter Timilty =

American politician

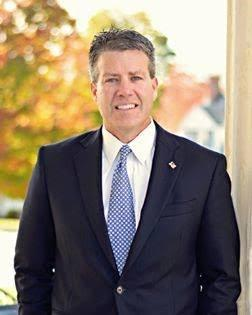

Member of the Massachusetts Senate from the Norfolk, Plymouth and Bristol district
- In office January 4, 2017 – January 1, 2025
- Preceded by: Brian A. Joyce
- Succeeded by: William Driscoll

Member of the Massachusetts House of Representatives from the 7th Norfolk district
- In office January 6, 1999 – January 4, 2017
- Preceded by: Brian A. Joyce
- Succeeded by: William Driscoll

Member of Milton Town Meeting
- In office 1997–1998

Personal details
- Born: Walter F. Timilty Jr. July 19, 1969 (age 57) Boston, Massachusetts, U.S.
- Party: Democratic
- Parent: Walter F. Timilty, Sr. (father)
- Education: Southern New England School of Law; Boston College
- Occupation: legislator

Walter F. Timilty Jr. (born July 19, 1969) is an American politician serving currently as the Norfolk County Clerk of Courts. Previously, he served as a member of the Massachusetts Senate from the Norfolk, Plymouth and Bristol district. A member of the Democratic Party, he previously represented the 7th Norfolk District in the Massachusetts House of Representatives from 1999 to 2017.

== Academic and political career ==
He is a graduate of Milton Academy, Boston College, and the Southern New England School of Law. In addition to his time in the House, Timilty served as a Town Meeting Member in Milton, and as a member of the Milton Democratic Town Committee. He was elected to the Massachusetts House of Representatives in 1998. He was re-elected in 2010, 2012, and 2014 without opposition. Timilty's district included portions of Milton and Randolph, Massachusetts. In 2016, Timilty ran for State Senate and defeated independent candidate Jonathan Lott in the general election with 73.9% of the vote.

== Timilty family ==
Timilty's cousins include State Senator James Timilty and James' sister Kelly Timilty (a member of the Massachusetts Governor's Council). His uncle, their father, is former State Senator Joseph Timilty.

== See also ==
- 2019–2020 Massachusetts legislature
- 2021–2022 Massachusetts legislature
- The Timilty family
- https://www.senatorwaltertimilty.com/
