= John F. Stokes =

American law enforcement officer (1889–1963)

Massachusetts Director of Civil Defense
- In office 1950–1954
- Preceded by: Position created
- Succeeded by: John J. Maginnis

Massachusetts Commissioner of Public Safety
- In office 1943–1950
- Preceded by: Eugene M. McSweeney
- Succeeded by: Daniel I. Murphy

Personal details
- Born: January 7, 1889 Cambridge, Massachusetts
- Died: January 1, 1963 (aged 73) Belmont, Massachusetts

Military service
- Allegiance: United States
- Branch/service: United States Army
- Years of service: 1917–1920
- Rank: Second lieutenant

John F. Stokes (January 7, 1889 – January 1, 1963) was an American law enforcement officer. He was involved with many high-profile cases as a detective with the Massachusetts State Police and later served as Massachusetts' Commissioner of Public Safety and Director of Civil Defense.

== Early life ==
Stokes was born on January 7, 1889, in Cambridge, Massachusetts. He left school at the age of sixteen to become a steamfitter.

== Law enforcement ==
=== Cambridge Police Department and military service ===
In 1911, Stokes joined the Cambridge Police Department as a patrolman. He left the force in September 1917 to enlist in the United States Army. He quickly rose to the rank of sergeant and was sent to officers' training school. He was then commissioned as a second lieutenant. Stokes was stationed at Camp Devens with an infantry division when World War I ended. After the war, Stokes returned to the Cambridge Police Department.

=== Massachusetts State Police ===
In the fall of 1920, Stokes became a detective with the Massachusetts State Police. He helped solve the murder of Grayce M. Asquith, the Millen-Faber Case, the kidnapping of Peggy McMath, and the Kennedy Jewel robberies. In 1937, he and Attorney General Paul A. Dever conducted one of the largest racketeering investigations in the state's history following the murder of Louis Gaeta. Stokes was once described by Leverett Saltonstall as the "greatest detective in the east".

In September 1934, Public Safety Commissioner Daniel Needham promoted Stokes to chief of detectives.

=== Commissioner of Public Safety ===
In 1941, Stokes became acting Commissioner of Public Safety after Eugene M. McSweeney became seriously ill. In 1942, he selected a five-story building at 1010 Commonwealth Avenue in Brookline to be the new headquarters of the Massachusetts State Police and oversaw the move from the old headquarters at Commonwealth Pier. On March 30, 1943, McSweeney resigned and Stokes was chosen by Governor Leverett Saltonstall to succeed him. Stokes was the first career law enforcement officer to become Commissioner of Public Safety. In 1946, he was reappointed by outgoing governor Maurice J. Tobin.

=== Massachusetts Civilian Defense Agency ===
In July 1950, Governor Paul A. Dever chose Stokes to the run the newly created Massachusetts Civilian Defense Agency. He planned on retiring after the cleanup of the 1953 Worcester tornado was complete, however he remained on longer after the man nominated to succeed him, Henry Parkman Jr., was offered the position of assistant United States High Commissioner in Germany by president Dwight D. Eisenhower. Upon retiring, Stokes waived his $9,750 pension in favor of a $6,500 retirement allowance on the grounds that his appointment as Civil Defense Director was meant to be temporary, therefore his pension should be based on his final salary as Public Safety Commissioner.

== Death ==
Stokes died suddenly on January 1, 1963, at his home in Belmont, Massachusetts.
