= Thomas F. Sullivan =

American governmental official

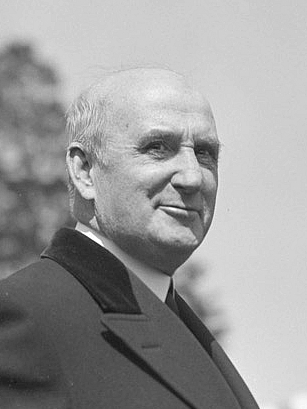

Commissioner of the Boston Police Department
- In office 1943–1957
- Preceded by: Joseph F. Timilty
- Succeeded by: Leo J. Sullivan

Acting Commissioner of the Boston Fire Department
- In office 1926–1926
- Preceded by: Theodore A. Glynn
- Succeeded by: Eugene Hultman

Chairman of the Boston Transit Commission
- In office 1922–1943
- Preceded by: Position created
- Succeeded by: Joseph F. Dever

Boston Commissioner of Public Works
- In office 1918–1922
- Preceded by: Edward F. Murphy
- Succeeded by: Joseph A. Rourke

Personal details
- Born: February 25, 1878 South Boston, Massachusetts
- Died: August 27, 1957 (aged 79) South Boston, Massachusetts
- Party: Democratic

Thomas F. Sullivan (February 25, 1878 – August 27, 1957) was an American government official who served as commissioner of the Boston Police Department, chairman of the city's transit department, commissioner of public works for the city, and, briefly, as Acting Commissioner of the Boston Fire Department.

== Early life ==
Sullivan was born on February 25, 1878, in South Boston. He graduated from The English High School in 1895. During the Spanish–American War he served as a sergeant in Cuba with the 9th Regiment Massachusetts Volunteer Infantry. He remained with the 9th Regiment until 1913, when he retired with the rank of major. During World War I he was colonel of the Tenth Infantry regiment of the Massachusetts National Guard.

== Boston Elevated Railway ==
Sullivan began his transit career as a clerk for the New York and New England Railroad. In 1898, he joined the Boston Elevated Railway's road construction office. In 1912 he was made roadmaster of the service lines. He was later promoted to assistant superintendent of tracks.

== Government service ==
=== Commissioner of public works ===
On March 18, 1918, Sullivan was appointed commissioner of public works by Boston Mayor Andrew J. Peters. During the 1921 Boston mayoral election, Sullivan supported John R. Murphy to succeed Peters. James Michael Curley won the election and replaced Sullivan as Public Works Commissioner.

=== Boston transit department ===
However, in March 1922 he named Sullivan chairman of the city transit department. He was reappointed by Mayors Frederick Mansfield and Maurice J. Tobin. In this role, Sullivan would supervise construction of all subway and rapid transit lines constructed over the next 21 years, which included the conversion of Maverick station to rapid transit, extension of the Dorchester rapid transit line from Andrew Square to Mattapan Square, extension of the Boylson Street subway out beyond Kenmore Square, construction of the Commonwealth Avenue underpass, digging for the Huntington Avenue subway, and the construction of the $20 million Sumner Tunnel.

=== Other offices ===
In 1926, Mayor Malcolm Nichols dismissed Curley's fire commissioner and Sullivan was named acting commissioner. After the civil service commission rejected Nichols' nominee, John T. Hawes, Sullivan was offered the position. He declined and on July 7, 1926 Eugene Hultman took charge of the department.

On September 21, 1934, Sullivan was appointed Emergency Relief Administration administrator for Boston. He held the same position with the ERA's superseding agency, the Works Progress Administration. As he was already collecting a salary from the city of Boston, he accepted a One-dollar salary for his work with the ERA/WPA.

In 1942, Sullivan joined the Army Specialist Corps as a Colonel and was placed in command of the Corps in New England. He also served as a technical advisor for Civilian Defense Region 5 and was the chief blackout officer for the Boston Public Safety Committee. On November 24, 1942, he was appointed state fuel and food conservator by Governor Leverett Saltonstall. Saltonstall also appointed Sullivan as chairman of the state aeronautics commission.

=== Boston Police Commissioner ===
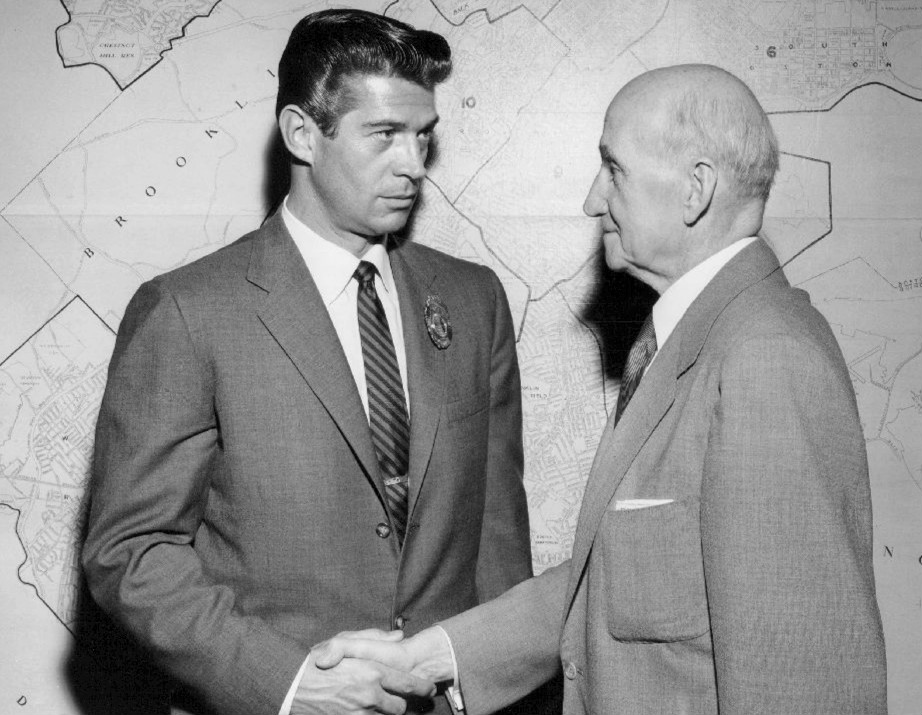
Sullivan making actor George Nader an honorary Boston police chief in 1955

In 1943, the term of controversial Boston police commissioner Joseph F. Timilty was coming to an end. Timilty would be allowed to stay until his successor was confirmed by the Massachusetts Governor's Council. A majority of council stated that they would quickly confirm a qualified appointee but would not "rubber stamp" an "unknown" nominee. Given his long career in public service, Sullivan was seen as a safe appointment. He was nominated by Governor Saltonstall on November 26 and confirmed that same day. Sullivan resigned all of his other positions so that he could devote his full attention to the police department. After taking office, Sullivan suspended Police Superintendent Edward W. Fallon and four other high ranking officers who were under indictment on charges of conspiracy to permit gambling.

On January 17, 1950, Sullivan issued a mobilization order calling every precinct captain and detective to duty minutes after the Great Brink's Robbery. It was the largest meeting of top ranking police officials since the Cocoanut Grove fire in 1942.

On January 31, 1951, Sullivan was appointed to a second seven-year term by Governor Paul Dever. He remained commissioner until his death on August 27, 1957.
