= Richard Wells (politician) =

American politician

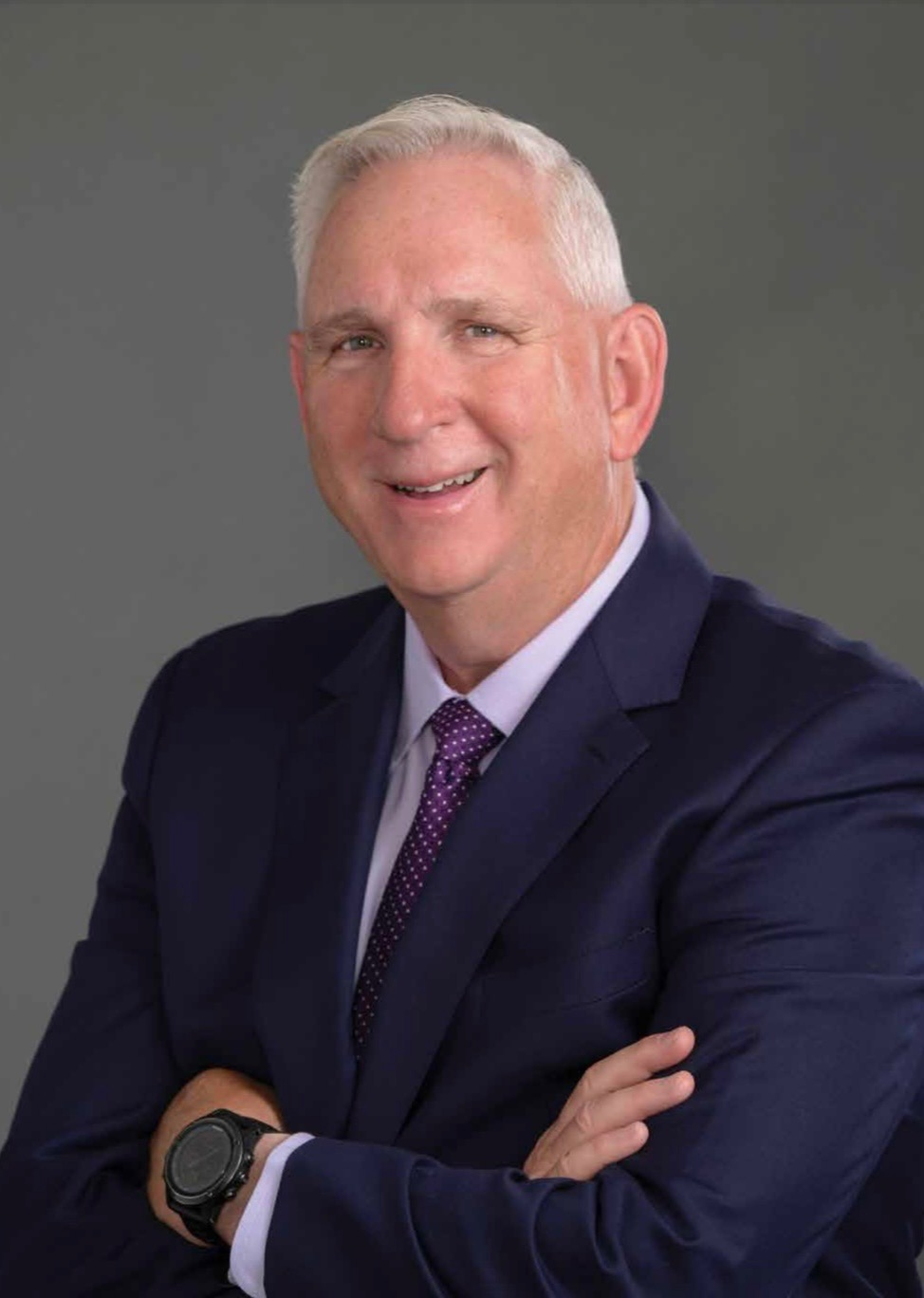

Member of the Massachusetts House of Representatives from the 7th Norfolk district
- Incumbent
- Assumed office January 1, 2025
- Preceded by: William Driscoll

Personal details
- Born: Milton, Massachusetts
- Party: Democratic
- Website: Campaign website

Richard Gerard Wells Jr. is an American politician who represents the 7th Norfolk district in the Massachusetts House of Representatives. A member of the Democratic Party, his district includes portions of the towns of Milton and Randolph.

== Early life and career ==
Wells was born in Milton, Massachusetts, and attended Milton High School. He received a bachelor's degree in criminal justice from Western New England University and a master's degree in criminal justice and public policy from Boston University.

Wells served as a patrolman with the Harvard University Police Department from 1983 to 1984 before joining the Milton Police Department in 1984. His father, Richard G. Wells Sr., served as chief of the department from 1988 to 1992. Wells later served as chief from 2007 to 2016, when the Milton Select Board declined to renew his contract. He subsequently retired from law enforcement.

== Political career ==
In 2016, Wells ran for a seat on the Milton Select Board after the board declined to renew his contract as police chief. He was defeated by incumbent Kathleen Conlon. Wells ran again in 2017 and was elected to the board. He continued to serve on the board until April 2026, fifteen months into his term in the Massachusetts House of Representatives.

In 2024, Wells won election to the 7th Norfolk district after incumbent William Driscoll retired to run for the Massachusetts Senate. He defeated two other candidates in the Democratic primary and unenrolled candidate Clinton Graham in the general election.

=== Committee Assignments ===
- Joint Committee on Higher Education
- Joint Committee on Municipalities and Regional Government
- Joint Committee on Public Safety and Homeland Security
- Joint Committee on Revenue
