= Paul G. Kirk =

American politician (born 1938)

Paul Kirk
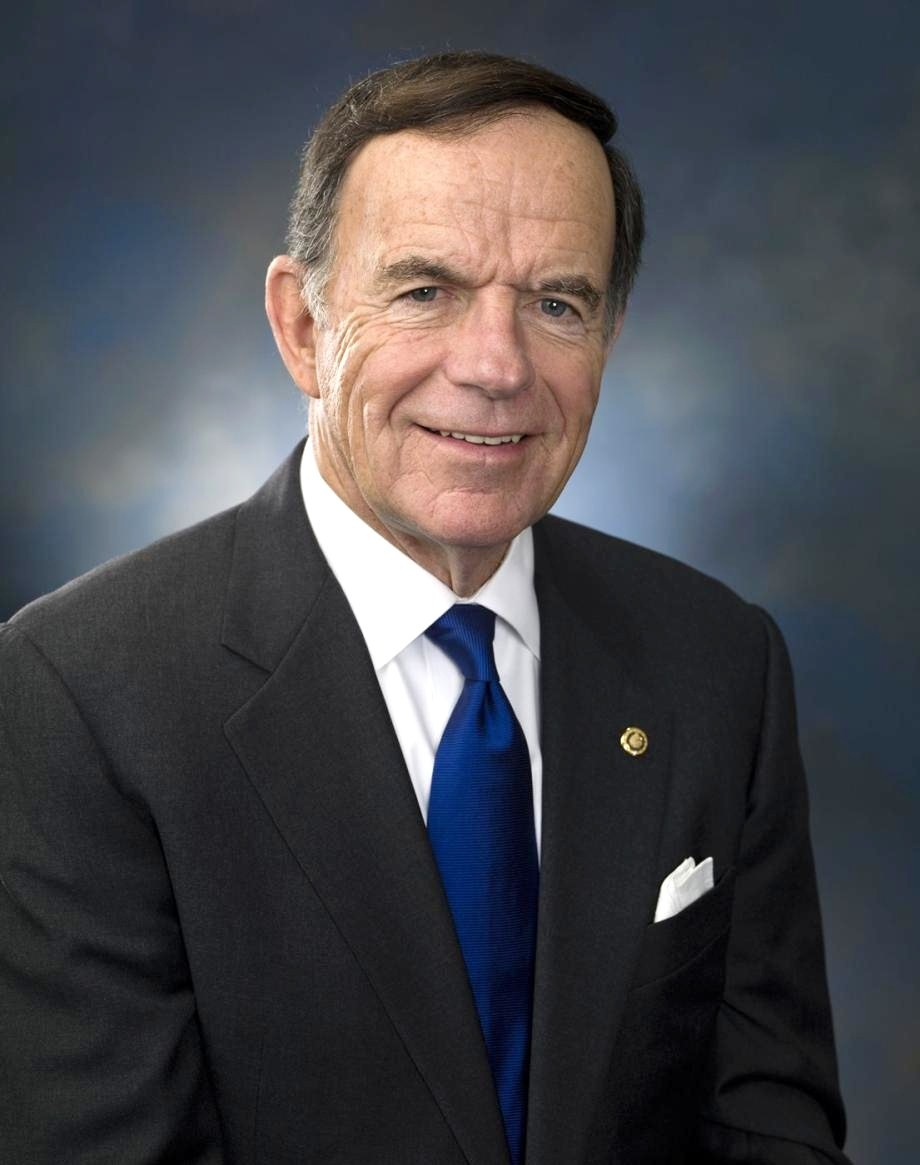
- Official portrait, 2009

United States Senator from Massachusetts
- In office September 24, 2009 – February 4, 2010
- Appointed by: Deval Patrick
- Preceded by: Ted Kennedy
- Succeeded by: Scott Brown

Chair of the Democratic National Committee
- In office February 2, 1985 – February 10, 1989
- Preceded by: Charles Manatt
- Succeeded by: Ron Brown

Treasurer of the Democratic National Committee
- In office June 29, 1983 – February 1, 1985
- Preceded by: Charles Curry
- Succeeded by: Sharon Pratt

Personal details
- Born: Paul Grattan Kirk Jr. January 18, 1938 (age 88) Newton, Massachusetts, U.S.
- Party: Democratic
- Spouse: Gail Loudermilk (m. 1974)
- Parents: Paul G. Kirk Sr. (father); Josephine O'Connell (mother)
- Relatives: William Henry O'Connell (great-uncle); Bill Cleary (brother-in-law)
- Education: Harvard University (BA, JD)

Military service
- Branch/service: United States Army
- Years of service: 1960–1968
- Rank: Captain
- Unit: United States Army Reserve
- Kirk's voice Kirk on former Sen. Edward Brooke and bipartisanship after Brooke was awarded the Congressional Gold Medal. Recorded October 29, 2009

Paul Grattan Kirk Jr. (born January 18, 1938) is an American lawyer and politician who served as a United States senator from Massachusetts from 2009 to 2010, having been appointed to fill the vacancy created by the death of Ted Kennedy. From 1985 to 1989, he chaired the Democratic National Committee (DNC).

He served as co-chairman of the Commission on Presidential Debates, the chairman of the board of directors of the John F. Kennedy Library Foundation, and a member of the board of directors of the Edward M. Kennedy Institute for the United States Senate.

== Early life and education ==
Kirk, one of five children, was born in Newton, Massachusetts. He is the son of Josephine Elizabeth (née O'Connell) and Judge Paul G. Kirk Sr., an associate justice of the Supreme Judicial Court of Massachusetts. His father was of Irish and English descent and his mother was of Irish ancestry. He attended The Roxbury Latin School and graduated from St. Sebastian's School in 1956, Harvard College in 1960, and Harvard Law School in 1964. In college, Kirk took part in the Reserve Officers' Training Corps program. He received his commission as a second lieutenant in 1960 and served on active duty for six months to complete his initial training. Kirk remained in the United States Army Reserve until 1968, when he was discharged as a captain.

== Career ==
Kirk was admitted to the Massachusetts Bar in 1965.

Kirk is affiliated with the law firm Sullivan & Worcester LLP of Boston, Massachusetts, and was a partner from 1977 to 1990. He is the chairman and chief executive officer of Kirk & Associates, Inc., a business advisory and consulting firm located in Boston. He is also a member of the board of directors of the Hartford Financial Services Group, Inc., Rayonier, Incorporated, and Cedar Realty Trust, Inc. He was a board member of ITT Corporation from 1989 to 1997 and Bradley Real Estate, Inc. from 1991 to 2000. Kirk is a trustee of Stonehill College. He also served as a trustee of St. Sebastian's School from 1992 to 2004 and again from 2006 to 2009. He is past chairman of the Harvard Board of Overseers Nominating Committee and is the chairman of the Harvard Overseers Committee to Visit the Department of Athletics.

From 1992 to 2001 Kirk was the chairman of the National Democratic Institute for International Affairs.

=== DNC ===
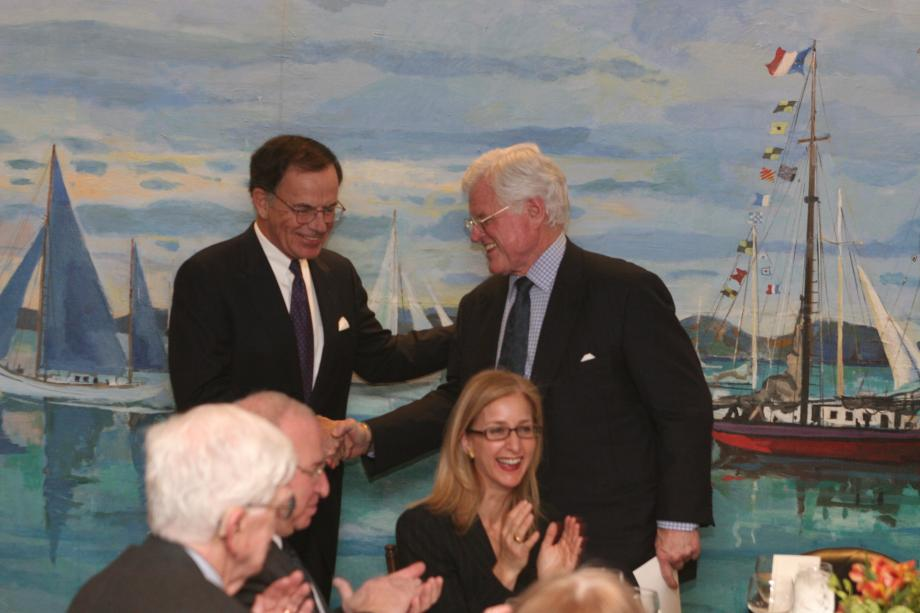
Kirk with his predecessor, Senator Ted Kennedy

Kirk was a special assistant to Senator Ted Kennedy from 1969 to 1977. In 1983, he became treasurer of the national Democratic Party.

In 1985 Kirk was elected chairman of the Democratic National Committee despite opposition from Virginia Governor Chuck Robb and a group of southern state Democrats who went on to form the Democratic Leadership Council. He caused a brief stir when he suggested means testing for Social Security, but he quickly withdrew his remarks. In the 1986 mid-term elections, under Kirk's chairmanship, the Democrats regained control of the Senate, which had had a Republican majority since the 1980 elections. Kirk resigned shortly after Republican vice president George H. W. Bush's victory over Massachusetts Governor Michael Dukakis in the 1988 presidential election. He was succeeded as DNC chairman by Ron Brown. During his time as DNC Chair, he promoted and executed a successful plan to take over the planning of presidential debates.

On May 2, 2008, Paul Kirk formally pledged his superdelegate nomination vote in the summer 2008 national Democratic convention to Barack Obama.

=== U.S. Senate ===
In August 2009, Senator Ted Kennedy died, leaving a vacancy in the Massachusetts Senate delegation. Five years earlier in 2004, the Massachusetts General Court had withdrawn the authority of the governor to fill a U.S. Senate vacancy by appointment, to prevent the then-Governor Mitt Romney, a Republican, from appointing a fellow Republican to fill the remainder of Democrat John Kerry's Senate term, if Kerry were to win the 2004 presidential election. The legislation was enacted over Romney's veto. At that time, Senator Ted Kennedy successfully made personal appeals to Massachusetts Democratic legislative leaders to pass the bill, which had been stalled prior to his request. The new law called for a special election months later to fill the vacancy. However, Kennedy's death denied Democrats in the U.S. Senate the 60‑vote supermajority required to end filibusters. Given the urgency of and narrow partisan support for some legislation before Congress, most notably health care reform, Democratic lawmakers and liberal pundits called for an interim senator to be appointed so that Massachusetts would have full Senate representation until the special election; Kennedy himself had requested such a change before he died. In September, the General Court passed legislation restoring the governor's power to make interim appointments to serve until the special election stipulated in the earlier legislation is held, over multiple bipartisan concerns of hypocrisy. It was reported that Kennedy's two sons, Patrick J. Kennedy and Edward Kennedy Jr.; and his widow, Victoria Reggie Kennedy, had all expressed their preference for Kirk and communicated this preference to Governor Deval Patrick. Governor Patrick announced Kirk's appointment on September 24, 2009. Kirk pledged he would not be a candidate in the special election, which was won by Republican Scott Brown. Kirk was sworn into office on September 25, 2009.

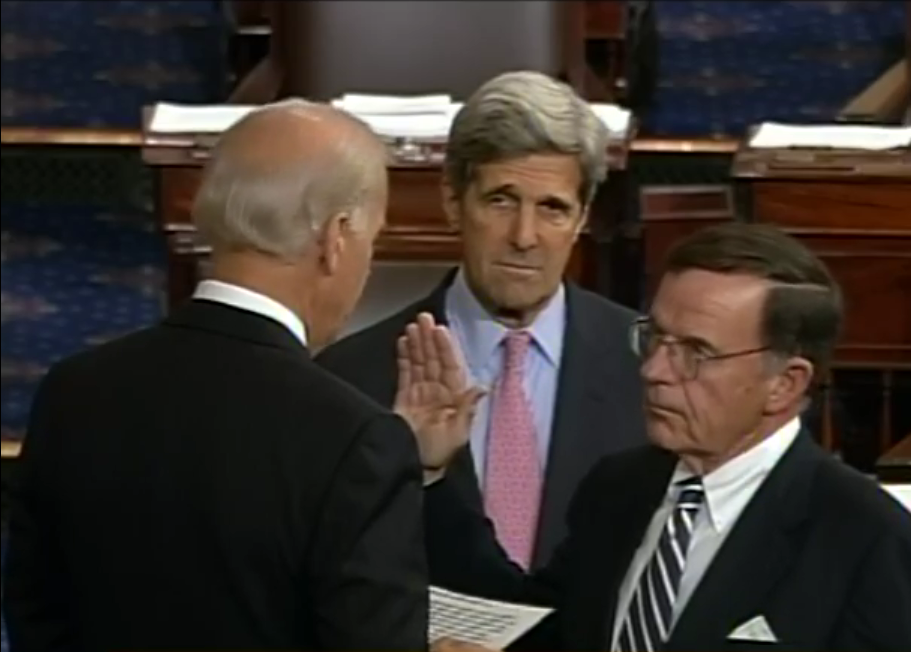
Vice President Joe Biden swears in Kirk, as Senator John Kerry looks on

On September 24, 2009, members of the Massachusetts Republican Party filed suit seeking to block the appointment of Kirk, saying that under commonwealth law, the law giving Gov. Patrick the right to appoint Kirk should not take effect for 90 days. A hearing was scheduled for the morning of September 25 to resolve the issue. A Suffolk Superior Court judge dismissed the case the same day, and Kirk took the oath of office as senator that afternoon.

On January 19, 2010, Scott Brown, a Republican state senator, was elected to serve the balance of Kennedy's term. Although Kirk was only appointed until his successor was elected, he continued to sit, and voted on the Senate floor on January 20, 2010, without any objection from Senate staff or Senate Republicans. This situation is analogous to 1993, when Kay Bailey Hutchison was elected on June 5, but Bob Krueger continued to hold the seat until she took the oath of office on June 14, but was different from when Ted Kennedy was allowed to be sworn into office the day after his special election to the Senate in 1962. Kirk was present at his successor's swearing-in ceremony on February 4, 2010.

=== Later career ===
Kirk supported Bernie Sanders in the 2016 Democratic Party presidential primaries. Kirk has written opinion columns for The Boston Globe.

== Personal life ==
In 1974, he married Gail Loudermilk. They reside in Marstons Mills, a village of Barnstable, Massachusetts. Kirk is a great-nephew of the late Cardinal William O'Connell and the brother-in-law of ice hockey player and coach Bill Cleary.

== See also ==
- List of Harvard University politicians

Party political offices
| Preceded by Charles Manatt | Chair of the Democratic National Committee; 1985–1989 | Succeeded by Ron Brown |
U.S. Senate
| Preceded by Ted Kennedy | U.S. Senator (Class 1) from Massachusetts; 2009–2010; Served alongside: John Kerry | Succeeded by Scott Brown |
U.S. order of precedence (ceremonial)
| Preceded by George Helmy as Former U.S. Senator | Order of precedence of the United States | Succeeded by Scott Brown as Former U.S. Senator |
