= Eugene M. McSweeney =

American public safety official (1880-1946)

Massachusetts Commissioner of Public Safety
- In office 1937–1943
- Preceded by: Paul G. Kirk Sr.
- Succeeded by: John F. Stokes

Boston Police Commissioner
- In office 1934–1936
- Preceded by: Joseph J. Leonard
- Succeeded by: Joseph F. Timilty

Boston Fire Commissioner
- In office 1933–1934
- Preceded by: Edward F. McLaughlin
- Succeeded by: Edward F. McLaughlin

Personal details
- Born: September 1, 1880 Marlborough, Massachusetts
- Died: January 21, 1946 (aged 65) West Roxbury
- Education: Manhattan College

Eugene M. McSweeney (September 1, 1880 – January 21, 1946) was an American public safety official who served as Massachusetts Commission of Public Safety and Boston's police and fire commissioner.

== Early life ==
McSweeney was born on September 1, 1880, in Marlborough, Massachusetts. He attended public school in Marlborough and Manhattan College in New York.

== Journalism ==
McSweeney began his career with the Boston Traveler. He then worked for the Hearst organization from 1910 to 1923. He then organized the Eugene M. McSweeney Advertising Agency. Six years later he returned to Hearst as circulation manager and assistant publisher for the Boston Record and American.

== City of Boston ==
=== Fire commissioner ===
In October 1933, fire commissioner Edward F. McLaughlin resigned in order to support Frederick Mansfield for Mayor. Mayor James Michael Curley chose McSweeney to replace McLaughlin. Mansfield won the election and McSweeney was replaced as fire commissioner in January 1934.

=== Police commissioner ===
In February 1934, Curley, now Governor of Massachusetts, removed Joseph J. Leonard from the office of police commissioner and replaced him with McSweeney. On November 25, 1936, Curley removed McSweeney from office on the grounds that McSweeney was protecting racketeers.

== Commonwealth of Massachusetts ==
In 1937, Governor Charles F. Hurley made McSweeney chairman of the Massachusetts Development and Industrial Commission. As a member of the commission, McSweeney organized a promotional campaign to bring manufacturing plants to the state.

In December 1937, Hurley appointed Paul G. Kirk Sr. to a judgeship on the Suffolk County Superior Court and chose McSweeney to replace him as Public Safety Commissioner. In December 1941, Republican governor Leverett Saltonstall reappointed McSweeney. However, due to serious illness, John F. Stokes served as acting commissioner from December 1941 until McSweeney's resignation in March 1943. McSweeney died on January 21, 1946, at his home in West Roxbury.
