= Paul G. Kirk Sr. =

American state supreme court justice (1904–1981)

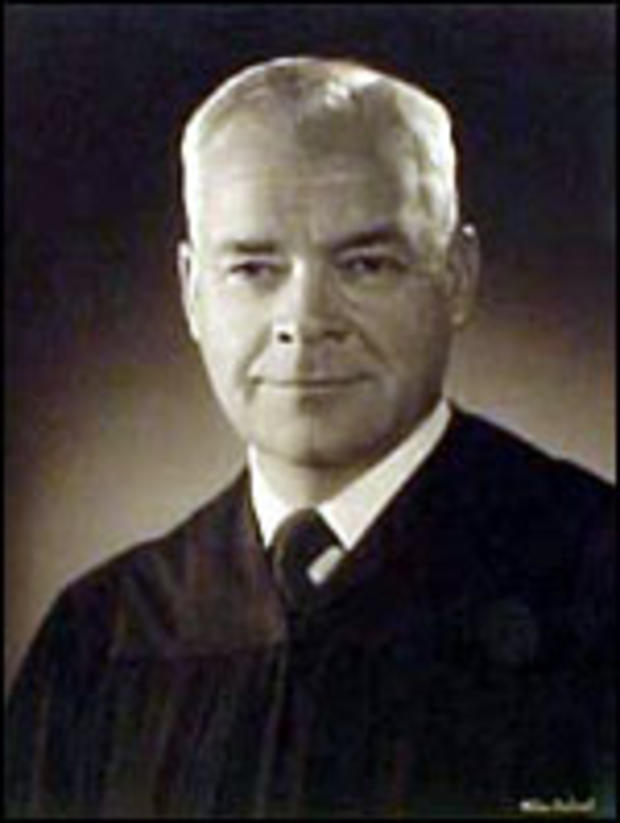

Associate Justice of the Massachusetts Supreme Judicial Court
- In office 1960–1970
- Nominated by: Foster Furcolo
- Preceded by: Edward A. Counihan
- Succeeded by: Robert Braucher

Massachusetts Commissioner of Public Safety
- In office 1934–1937
- Preceded by: Daniel Needham
- Succeeded by: Eugene M. McSweeney

Personal details
- Born: Paul Grattan Kirk; September 25, 1904 Boston, Massachusetts, U.S.
- Died: August 2, 1981 (aged 75) Centerville, Massachusetts, U.S.
- Children: 5 (including Paul G. Kirk Jr.)
- Education: Harvard University (BA, JD)

Military service
- Allegiance: United States
- Branch/service: United States Army
- Years of service: 1922–1945
- Rank: Brigadier general
- Unit: 101st Field Artillery Regiment 101st Engineers
- Awards: Battle Star (5)

Paul Grattan Kirk (September 25, 1904 – August 2, 1981) was an American jurist who served as an associate justice of the Massachusetts Supreme Judicial Court.

== Early life ==
Kirk was born on September 25, 1904, in East Boston. He was the tenth of John and Maud's fourteen children. He graduated from The English High School in 1922, Harvard University in 1926, and Harvard Law School in 1929. After law school, he joined the firm of Hale & Dorr. On September 19, 1934, he married Josephine O'Connell. The ceremony was performed by her uncle, Cardinal William Henry O'Connell.

== Military career ==
On June 23, 1922, Kirk enlisted in the 2nd Battalion of the 101st Field Artillery Regiment. He later served as a staff sergeant and on May 1, 1924, was commissioned as a second lieutenant. He was promoted to first lieutenant on December 1, 1925, captain on November 16, 1927, major on July 23, 1930. In 1931 he was appointed to the military staff of Governor Joseph Ely. On June 18, 1934, he was promoted to lieutenant colonel.

In January 1941, Kirk's National Guard unit was called into active service. During World War II he served in the European theatre. During his time in Europe, he saw action in North Africa, Italy, France, Germany, and Czechoslovakia and won five battle stars. He served as an Army officer and eventually became commander of the 101st Engineers. In 1943, he left the 101st to take an assignment with the Army Military Government in Italy reorganizing the royal military police. In 1944 he joined the general staff of the 7th U.S. Army and Sixth United States Army Group. He was discharged from the Army in 1945 with the brevet rank of brigadier general.

== Commissioner of Public Safety ==
In October 1934, Governor Ely appointed Kirk to the position of Commissioner of Public Safety. He was sworn in on October 3, 1934. He was retained by Ely's successor, James Michael Curley.

== Judicial career ==
In December 1937, Kirk was appointed to a judgeship on the Suffolk County Superior Court by Governor Charles F. Hurley. On November 23, 1960, Kirk was nominated by Governor Foster Furcolo to fill a vacancy on the Massachusetts Supreme Judicial Court. He retired from the court on December 15, 1970.

== Personal life and death ==
Following his retirement, Kirk moved from Newton, Massachusetts to Centerville, Massachusetts. He died suddenly on August 2, 1981, at his home. He was survived by his two sons, Paul Jr. and Edward, and three daughters, Josephine, Kathleen, and Maud. One of his sons-in-law was an ice hockey player and coach Bill Cleary.
