= Paul Feeney =

American politician

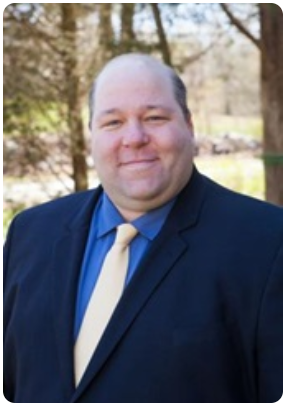

Member of the Massachusetts Senate from the Bristol and Norfolk district
- Incumbent
- Assumed office November 1, 2017
- Preceded by: James Timilty

Chairman of the Foxborough Board of Selectmen
- In office May 12, 2009 – May 12, 2010
- Preceded by: Mark Sullivan
- Succeeded by: Lynda Walsh

Member of the Foxborough Board of Selectmen
- In office May 12, 2007 – May 12, 2010

Personal details
- Born: March 23, 1978 (age 48)
- Party: Democratic
- Spouse: Laura J. Feeney (Caparell)
- Occupation: Legislator
- Website: votefeeney.com

Paul R. Feeney is an American politician who serves in the Massachusetts Senate representing the Bristol and Norfolk district. He is a registered Democrat.

== Education and early career ==
Feeney graduated from Don Bosco Technical High School. He worked for Verizon as an office technician, and served as the legislative director for the International Brotherhood of Electrical Workers.

== Politicla career ==
He served on the board of selectmen for Foxboro, Massachusetts, from 2007 though 2010. Feeney has also served as chief of staff for Jim Timilty and as labor director for Stephen F. Lynch's campaign for the United States Senate in the 2013 special election. Feeney was state director of Connecticut and Massachusetts for the Bernie Sanders 2016 presidential campaign.

When Timilty resigned in 2017, Feeney ran in the special election to succeed him, defeating Republican Jacob Ventura. Feeney defeated Ventura in the 2018 general election.

== Electoral history ==
2024 Massachusetts Bristol and Norfolk General Election
Party	Candidate	Votes	%
Democratic	Paul Feeney	61,252	72.6
Workers Party (United States)	Laura L. Saylor	22,661	26.9
Write-in		432	0.5
Total votes		84,345	100.0

2022 Massachusetts Bristol and Norfolk General Election
Party	Candidate	Votes	%
Democratic	Paul Feeney	40,353	58.7
Republican	Michael Chaisson	26,221	38.1
Workers Party (United States)	Laura L. Saylor	2,168	3.2
Write-in		17	0.1
Total votes		68,759	100.0

In 2020 Feeney went unopposed in the Democratic Primary and the General Election.

2018 Massachusetts Bristol and Norfolk General Election
Party	Candidate	Votes	%
Democratic	Paul Feeney	41,846	60.5
Republican	Jacob J. Ventura	27,248	39.4
Write-in		53	0.1
Total votes		69,147	100.0

2017 Massachusetts Bristol and Norfolk Special General Election
Party	Candidate	Votes	%
Democratic	Paul Feeney	6,985	47.3
Republican	Jacob J. Ventura	6,406	43.4
Independent	Joseph M. Shortsleeve	1,355	9.2
Write-in		17	0.1
Total votes		14,763	100.0

2017 Massachusetts Bristol and Norfolk Special Democratic Primary
Party	Candidate	Votes	%
Democratic	Paul Feeney	3,152	58.4
Democratic	Ted Philips	2,222	41.2
Write-in		21	0.4
Total votes		5,395	100.0

2006 Massachusetts 1st Bristol District Democratic Primary
Party	Candidate	Votes	%
Democratic	Claire B. Naughton	2,597	60.4
Democratic	Paul Feeney	1,211	28.1
Democratic	Matthew J. Donovan	488	11.3
Write-in		6	0.1
Total votes		4,302	100.0

== See also ==
- 2019–2020 Massachusetts legislature
- 2021–2022 Massachusetts legislature
