= Great Brink's Robbery =

1950 security company robbery

Coordinates: 42.3672°N 71.0575°W

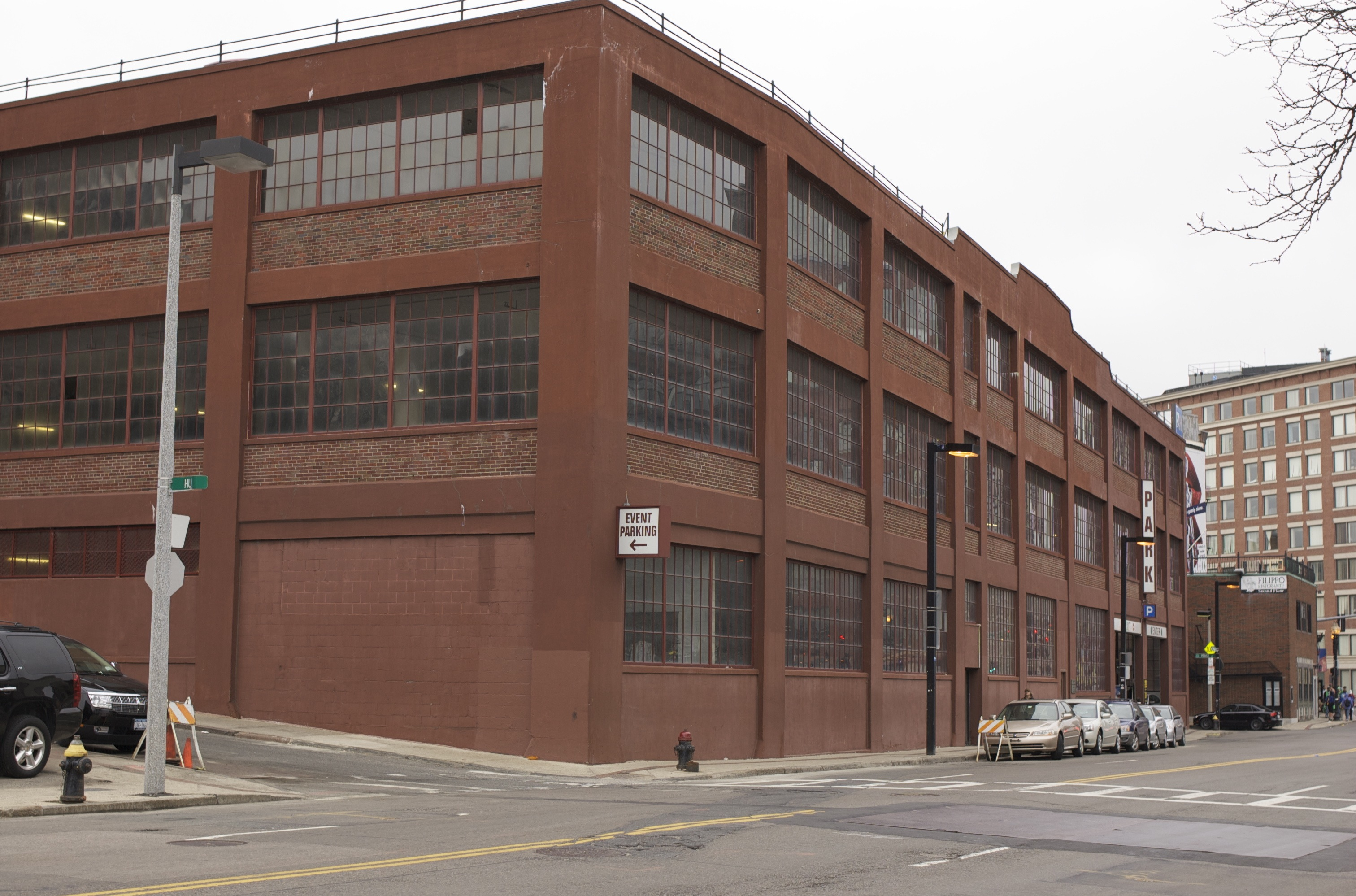
Present-day North Terminal Garage in Boston, site of the Great Brink's Robbery in 1950

The Great Brink's Robbery was an armed robbery of the Brink's building in the North End of Boston, Massachusetts, on January 17, 1950. The $2.775 million ($37.1 million today) theft consisted of $1,218,211.29 in cash and $1,557,183.83 in checks, money orders, and other securities. It was at the time the largest robbery in the history of the United States and has been called "the crime of the century," and "the perfect crime ". The robbery remained unsolved for nearly six years, until estranged group member Joseph O'Keefe testified only days before the statute of limitations would have expired.

Of the eleven people involved in the robbery, eight would receive life sentences after a trial, with two others dying before they could be convicted. Less than $60,000 of the more than $2.7 million stolen would ever be recovered. The robbery received significant press coverage and was eventually adapted into four movies.

== Perpetrators ==
- Joseph McGinnis – according to O'Keefe's testimony, McGinnis was the mastermind behind the robbery; however, this was later disputed by Geagan. He was responsible for destroying incriminating evidence, including guns, the truck, and clothes. McGinnis died in prison on October 5, 1966.
- Joseph "Specs" O'Keefe – O'Keefe died in March 1976, at the age of 67.
- Anthony Pino – according to Geagan, Pino was the leader of the gang. Pino died in October 1973, at the age of 67.
- Adolph "Jazz" Maffie – Maffie died in September 1988, at the age of 77. He was the last surviving member of the robbery.
- Thomas "Sandy" Richardson – Richardson died in 1980, at the age of 73.
- Vincent Costa – Costa was released from prison in 1969 after being paroled. He was arrested again in 1985 and charged with cocaine trafficking.
- Michael Geagan – Geagan was released in 1969 after being paroled.
- Henry Baker – Baker died in prison in 1961, at the age of 54.
- James Faherty – Faherty, along with Geagan and Maffie, was released in 1969 after being paroled.
- Joseph Banfield – Banfield died in 1955, at the age of 45.
- Stanley Gusciora – Gusciora died in July 1956 of a brain tumor, before he could be tried for his role in the robbery.

== Planning ==
The robbery was first conceived in 1947; however, in 1948, after months of planning, the group learned that Brink's had moved to a new location. While the theft was originally intended to be a burglary, rather than an armed robbery, they could not find a way around the building's burglar alarm. Due to this perceived obstacle, O'Keefe and Gusciora actually infiltrated the headquarters of the Boston-based alarm company that serviced Brink's months prior to the robbery. The pair acquired documents outlining the specific protective systems in use at Brink's before realizing that these documents would serve little use to them. The duo later replaced the copy of the security plans in the same manner, going undetected as they did before. After this unsuccessful effort, the group began observing the movements of the guards from rooftops on Prince Street and Snow Hill Street with binoculars. Following their surveillance, they decided that the robbery should take place just after 7 pm, as the vault would be open and fewer guards would be on duty. Over a period of several months, the robbers removed each lock from the building and had a key made for it, before returning the lock. Two vehicles were stolen: a green 1949 Ford stake-body truck, to carry away the loot from the robbery, and a car, which would be used to block any pursuit. Vincent Costa was the group's lookout and signaled with a flashlight from a nearby rooftop when he saw the vault being opened. After five aborted runs, Costa finally gave the go-ahead on the night of January 17, 1950.

== Robbery ==
On the night of the robbery, most of the group hid outside the building awaiting signal from Costa on a nearby rooftop before entering. Seven of the group members went into the Brink's building: O’Keefe, Gusciora, Baker, Maffie, Geagan, Faherty, and Richardson, while Pino and McGinnis waited in the getaway car. They each wore a chauffeur cap, pea coat, a rubber Captain Marvel-style Halloween mask, and each held laundry-type canvas bags, rope to tie the employees, and a .38 caliber revolver . They also wore rubber soles on their shoes to muffle the sound of their footsteps. At 7:10 pm, they used copied keys to enter the building, surprising the five employees working in the vault area. They tied up and taped the mouths of the employees and then proceeded to spend about twenty minutes inside the vault putting money into the large canvas bags. While the money was being placed in the bags, a buzzer sounded signifying that someone wanted to enter the vault area. The buzzer was sounded by a garage attendant who was unaware the robbery was occurring. Two members of the group moved towards the door to capture him, however he walked away before they could do so. There were believed to be about 14 canvas bags used in total, with the cumulative weight of the bags equaling more than half a ton. The total amount stolen was $1,218,211 in cash and $1,557,183 in checks and other securities. The group left the building at about 7:30, escaping in their getaway vehicle without trace. About one million dollars in silver and coins was left behind by the robbers; as they were not prepared to carry it . By 7:37, one of the Brink's employees managed to free himself and raise the alarm.

== Investigation and aftermath ==
Immediately following the robbery, Police Commissioner Thomas F. Sullivan sent a mobilization order to all precinct captains and detectives. Thirteen people were detained in the hours following the robbery, including two former employees of Brink's. Boston Police Superintendent Edward W. Fallon expressed that he had "no doubt" that the crime was an "inside job," speculating the involvement of blueprints and rehearsals correlating with the former employees in custody; this ended up being false, with the former employees released. Brink's, Inc. offered a $100,000 reward for information leading to the arrest and conviction of those involved in the robbery, with an additional 5% of recovered cash offered by the insurance company. Director of the Federal Bureau of Investigation, J. Edgar Hoover, took over supervision of the investigation.

The only physical evidence left at the crime scene was a cap and the tape and rope used to bind the employees. Four revolvers were also taken from the guards at the vault, and the FBI took note of this should the serial numbers provide a link to the men. Most of the cash stolen was in denominations of $1 to $20, which made it nearly impossible to trace the bills through serial numbers. Any information police could get from their informers initially proved useless. The truck that the robbers had used was found cut to pieces in Stoughton, Massachusetts, near O'Keefe's home.

In June 1950, O’Keefe and Gusciora were arrested in Pennsylvania for a burglary. O’Keefe was sentenced to three years in Bradford County Jail and Gusciora to 5-to-20 years in the Western State Penitentiary at Pittsburgh. Police heard through their informers that O'Keefe and Gusciora demanded money from Pino and MacGinnis in Boston to fight their convictions. It was later claimed that most of O'Keefe's share went to his legal defense.

FBI agents tried to talk to O'Keefe and Gusciora in prison but the two professed ignorance of the Brink's robbery. Other members of the group came under suspicion, but there was not enough evidence for an indictment, so law enforcement kept pressure on the suspects. Adolph Maffie was convicted and sentenced to nine months for income tax evasion.

After O'Keefe was released, he was taken to stand trial for another burglary and parole violations and was released on a bail of $17,000. O'Keefe later claimed that he had never seen his portion of the loot after he had given it to Maffie for safekeeping. Apparently in need of money, he kidnapped Vincent Costa and demanded his part of the loot for ransom.

Pino paid a small ransom but then decided to try to kill O'Keefe. After a couple of attempts, he hired underworld hitman Elmer "Trigger" Burke to kill O'Keefe. Burke traveled to Boston and shot O'Keefe, seriously wounding him but failing to kill him. The FBI approached O'Keefe in the hospital, and on January 6, 1956, he decided to talk.

On January 12, 1956, just five days before the statute of limitations was to run out, the FBI arrested Baker, Costa, Geagan, Maffie, McGinnis, and Pino. They apprehended Faherty and Richardson on May 16 in Dorchester. O'Keefe pleaded guilty on January 18. Gusciora died on July 9. Banfield was already dead. A trial began on August 6, 1956.

Eight of the gang's members received maximum sentences of life imprisonment. All were paroled by 1971 except McGinnis, who died in prison. O'Keefe received four years and was released in 1960. Only $58,000 of the $2.7 million was recovered.

O'Keefe cooperated with writer Bob Considine on The Men Who Robbed Brink's, a 1961 "as told to" book about the robbery and its aftermath.

In 1972 Pino, Costa, Maffie, Richardson and Geagan were interviewed by Noel Behn for the book The Big Stick-Up at Brink’s which is considered the most comprehensive record of the robbery.

== Films ==
At least four movies were based, or partially based, on the Great Brink's Robbery:

- Six Bridges to Cross (1955, Joseph Pevney)
- Blueprint for Robbery (1961, Jerry Hopper)
- Brinks: The Great Robbery (1976, Marvin J. Chomsky)
- The Brink's Job (1978, William Friedkin)

== See also ==
- List of bank robbers and robberies
  - Large-value US robberies
- 1981 Brink's robbery, an armed robbery in the state of New York
- Isabella Stewart Gardner Museum theft, a robbery of artwork in Boston in 1990
