= John Tyler Jr. =

Confederate States Army colonel

John Tyler V
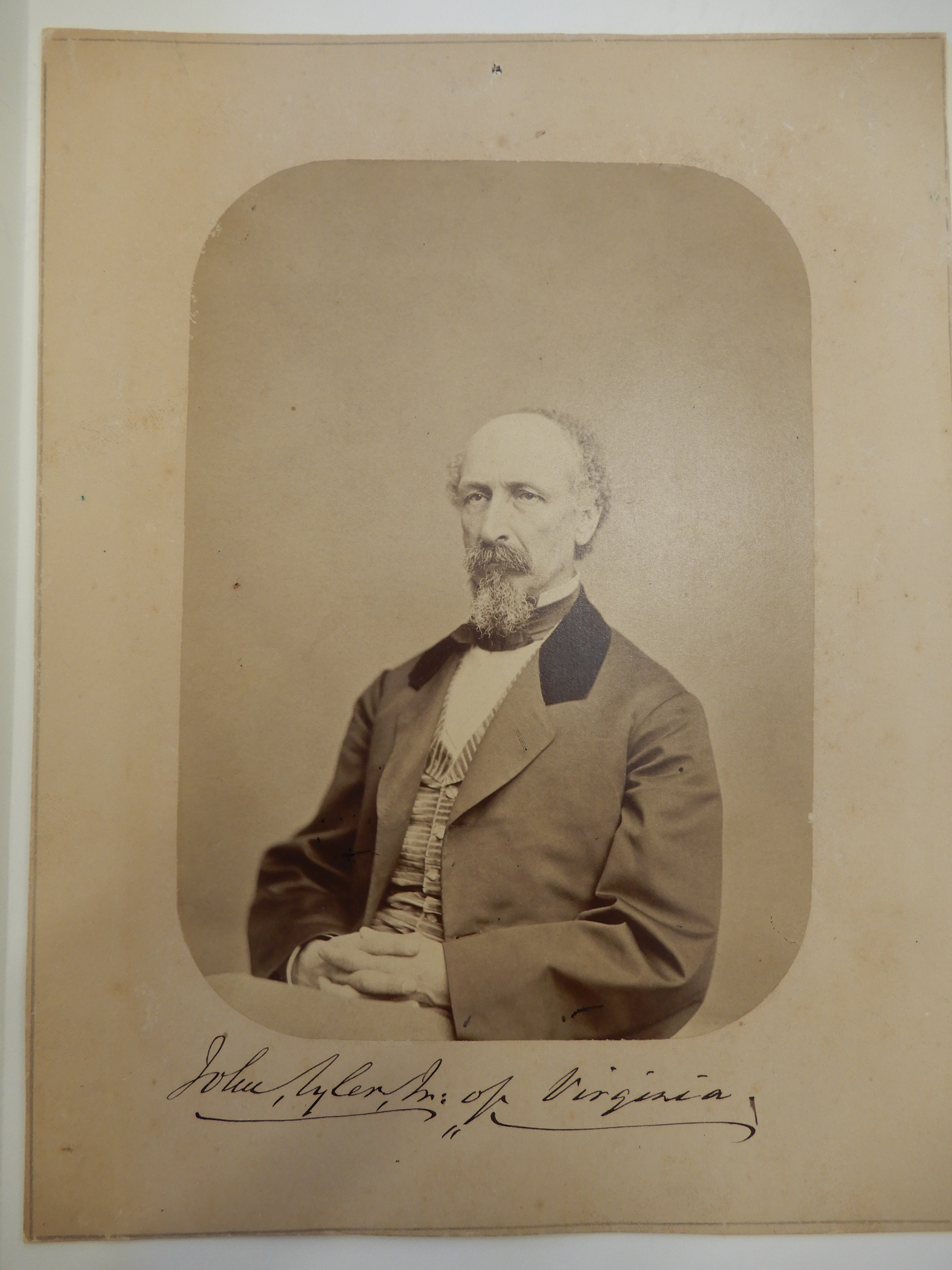
- Tyler c.1870s

Private Secretary to the President
- In office April 4, 1841 – March 4, 1845
- President: John Tyler
- Preceded by: Henry Huntington Harrison
- Succeeded by: Joseph Knox Walker

Personal details
- Born: April 27, 1819 Charles City County, Virginia, U.S.
- Died: January 26, 1896 (aged 76) Washington, D.C., U.S.
- Party: Republican
- Spouse: Martha Frances Rochelle (m. 1838)
- Children: 4
- Parents: John Tyler (father); Letitia Christian Tyler (mother)
- Relatives: John Tyler Sr. (grandfather)
- Education: University of Virginia; University of Pennsylvania

Military service
- Allegiance: United States; Confederate States
- Branch/service: United States Army (USA); Confederate States Army (CSA)
- Years of service: 1847 (USA); 1861–1865 (CSA)
- Rank: Captain (USA); Colonel (CSA)
- Commands: 13th Infantry (USA)
- Battles/wars: Mexican–American War

John Tyler V (April 27, 1819 – January 26, 1896) was an American army colonel, attorney, politician, and writer. He was the second son of John Tyler, the tenth president of the United States. Tyler served as Assistant Secretary of War of the Confederate States. Previously, Tyler served as private secretary for his father's presidential administration.

== Early life and education ==
John Tyler V was born on April 27, 1819, to John Tyler and Letitia Tyler. He was a member of the Tyler family. He had fourteen siblings: Mary, Robert, Letitia, Elizabeth, Anne, Alice, Tazewell, David, John Alexander, Julia, Lachlan, Lyon, Robert Fitzwalter, and Margaret Pearl. His mother was from a wealthy planter family who owned Cedar Grove plantation. His father was U.S. representative for Virginia's 23rd district congressional district from a wealthy slave-owning Virginia family descended from the First Families of Virginia.

Tyler attended the University of Virginia and the University of Pennsylvania, where he studied American law and government.

== Career ==
Tyler served as a captain in the U.S. Army during the Mexican-American War. Previously, Tyler served as private secretary for his father's presidential administration. In later life, he served as a colonel in the Confederate States Army. After the Civil War, Tyler practiced law in Baltimore before being appointed by President Ulysses S. Grant to a minor role in the Internal Revenue Bureau in Tallahassee, Florida.

== Death and legacy ==
Tyler died on January 26, 1896. He was temporarily placed in the Public Vault at the Congressional Cemetery. His funeral was hosted at his late residence, 1217 B street southeast, on January 29, at 11 o'clock. He was then buried at Arlington National Cemetery. He was the last surviving son of former President John Tyler's first marriage.
