= North Terminal Garage =

- U.S. National Register of Historic Places
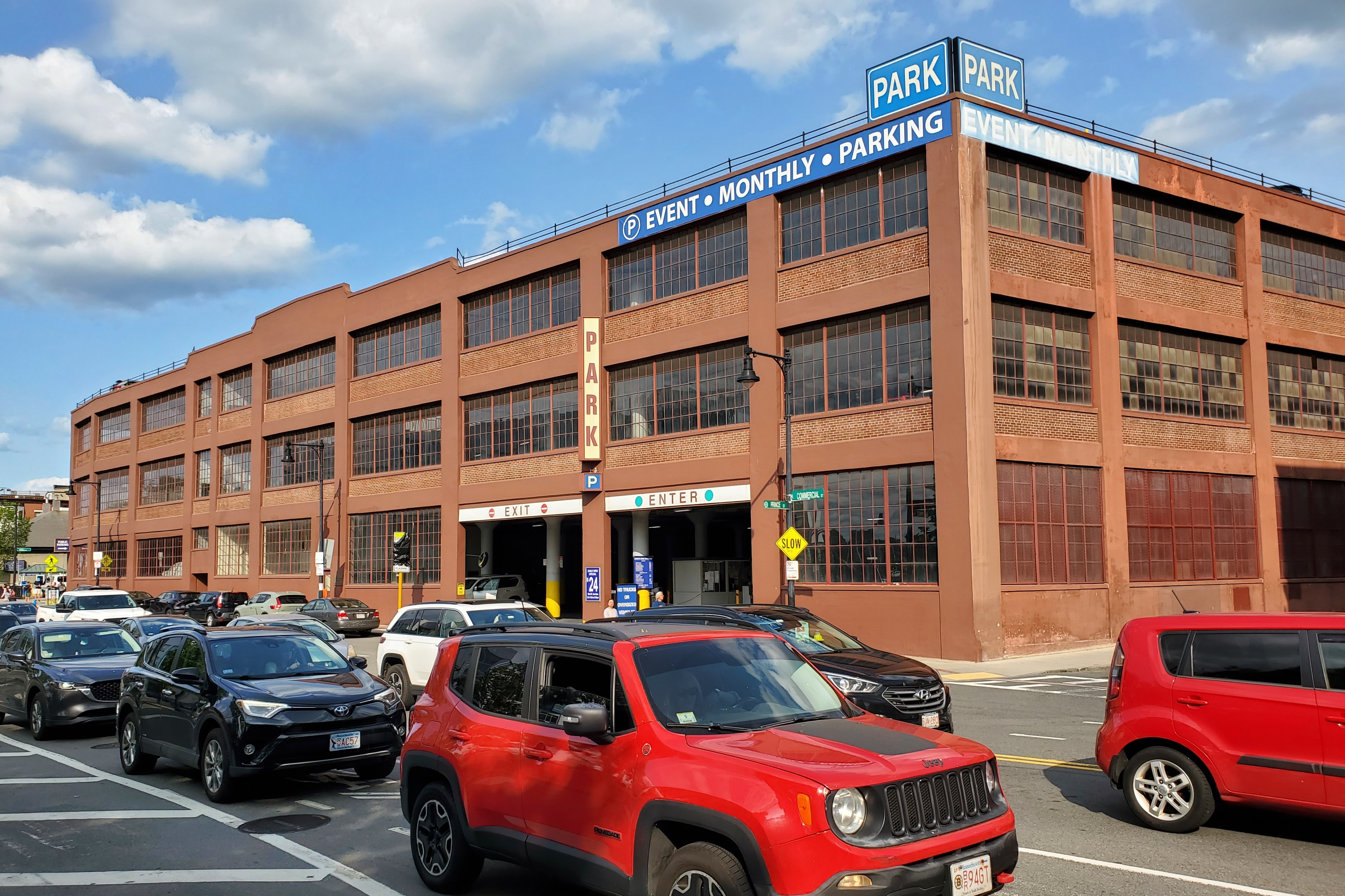
- North Terminal Garage in June 2025

- Location within Boston Location within Massachusetts Location within the United States
- Location: Boston, Massachusetts
- Coordinates: 42°22′1″N 71°3′28″W
- Built: 1925
- Built by: Aberthaw Company
- Architect: Little & Russell
- Architectural style: Early Commercial
- NRHP reference No.: 97000971
- Added to NRHP: September 11, 1997

The North Terminal Garage is a historic parking garage on 600 Commercial Street in the North End of Boston, Massachusetts. The three-story concrete garage was built in 1925 to a design by Little & Russell. It is a rare surviving parking facility from such an early date, and is further notable as the site of the Great Brink's Robbery on January 17, 1950. The building was listed on the National Register of Historic Places in 1997.

== See also ==
- National Register of Historic Places listings in northern Boston, Massachusetts
