= Massachusetts House of Representatives' 7th Norfolk district =

American legislative district

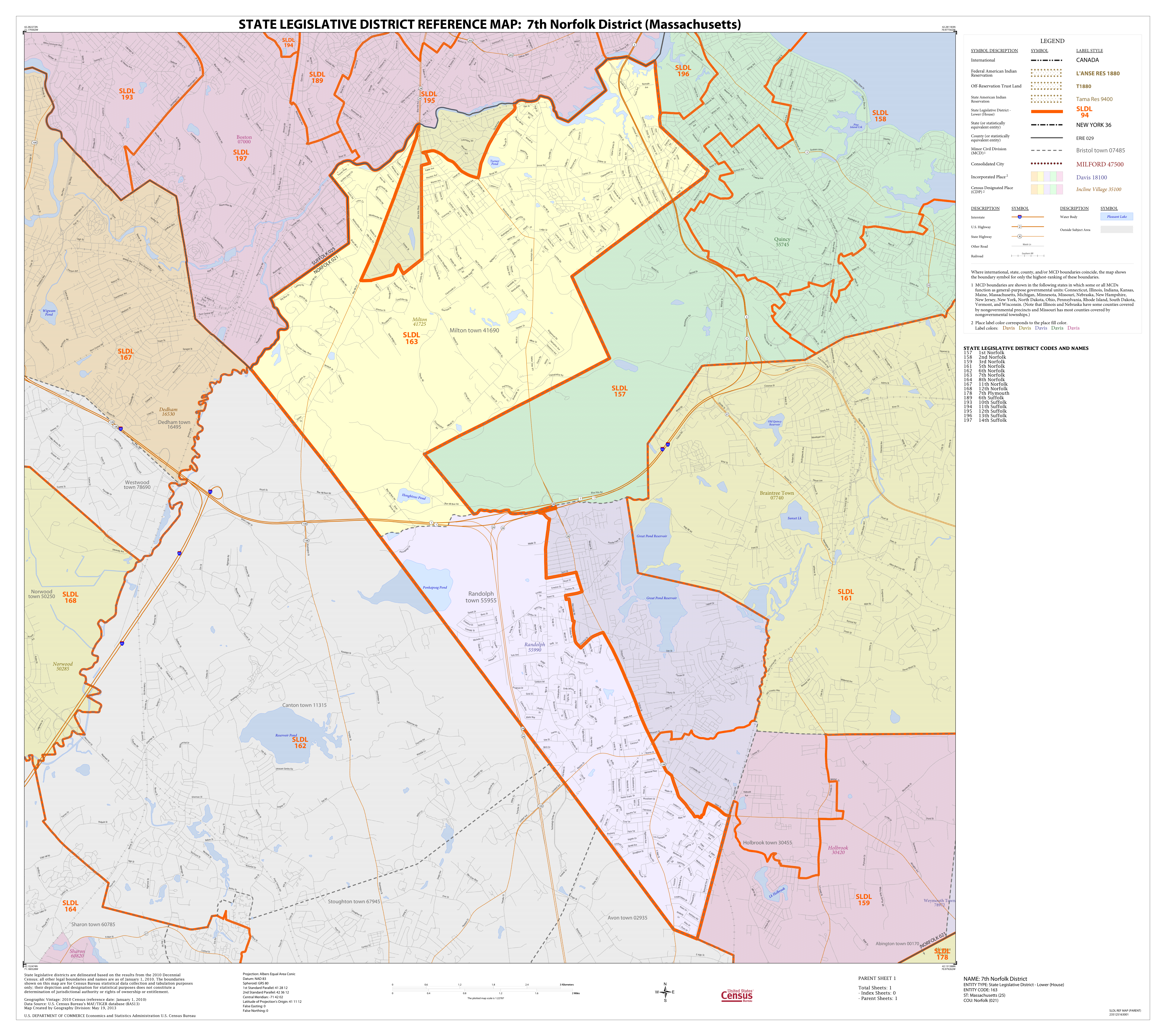
Map of Massachusetts House of Representatives' 7th Norfolk district, based on the 2010 United States census.

Massachusetts House of Representatives' 7th Norfolk district in the United States is one of 160 legislative districts included in the lower house of the Massachusetts General Court. It covers part of Norfolk County. Democrat Richard Wells has represented the district since 2025.

== Towns represented ==
The district includes the following localities:

- part of Milton
- part of Randolph

The current district geographic boundary overlaps with that of the Massachusetts Senate's Norfolk, Bristol and Plymouth district.

=== Former locale ===
The district previously covered Braintree, circa 1872.

== Representatives ==
- Horace Abercrombie, circa 1858
- William L. Walker, circa 1859
- Bernard Dolan, circa 1888
- Rufus A. Thayer, circa 1888
- Walter F. Stephens, circa 1920
- Charles F. Holman, circa 1951
- William Dix Morton Jr., circa 1951
- Maurice E. Ronayne, Jr, circa 1971-1975
- Elizabeth N. Metayer, 1975-1979
- M. Joseph Manning, 1979-1997
- Brian A. Joyce, 1997-1999
- Walter F. Timilty Jr., 1999-2017
- William J. Driscoll Jr, 2017-2025
- Richard Wells, 2025-Present

== See also ==
- List of Massachusetts House of Representatives elections
- Other Norfolk County districts of the Massachusetts House of Representatives: 1st, 2nd, 3rd, 4th, 5th, 6th, 8th, 9th, 10th, 11th, 12th, 13th, 14th, 15th
- List of Massachusetts General Courts
- List of former districts of the Massachusetts House of Representatives

== Images ==
Portraits of legislators

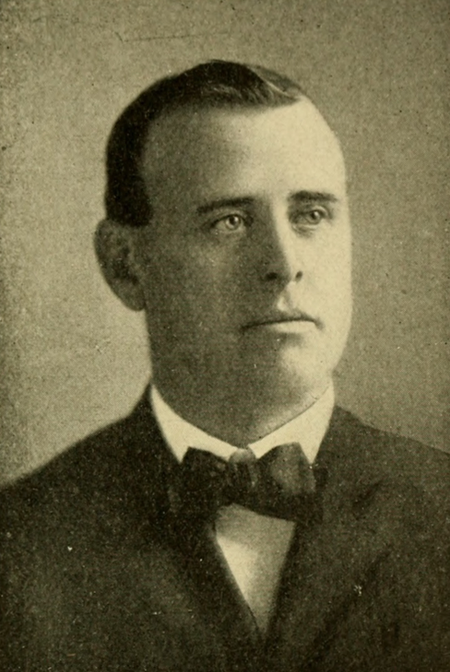
Russell Worster

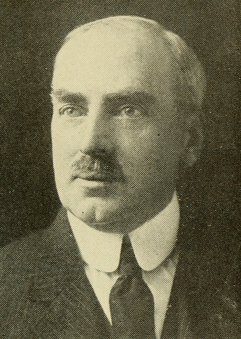
Timothy Quinn

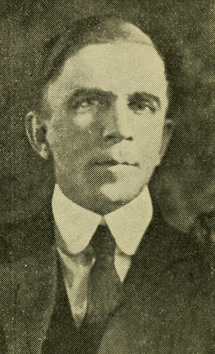
John Augustine Kelleher

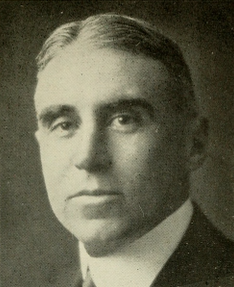
Josiah Babcock

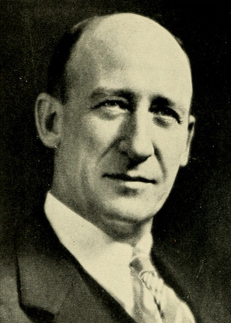
Charles Holman

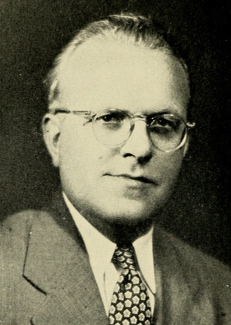
Frederick Haigis

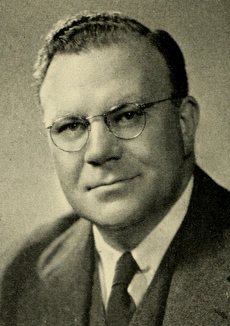
William Dix Morton

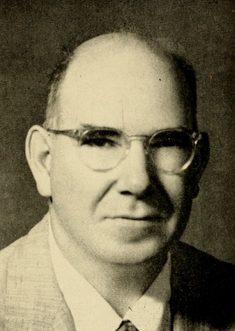
Harold Rosen

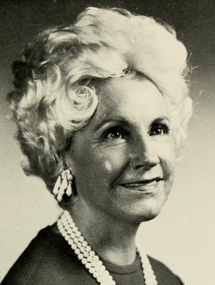
Elizabeth Metayer

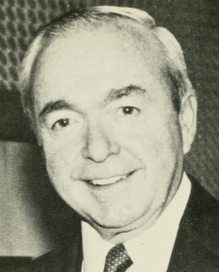
M. Joseph Manning

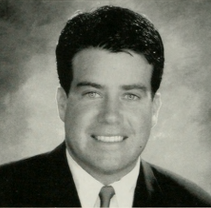
Walter Timilty
