= 1951 Boston mayoral election =

Election in Massachusetts, United States

- November 6, 1951
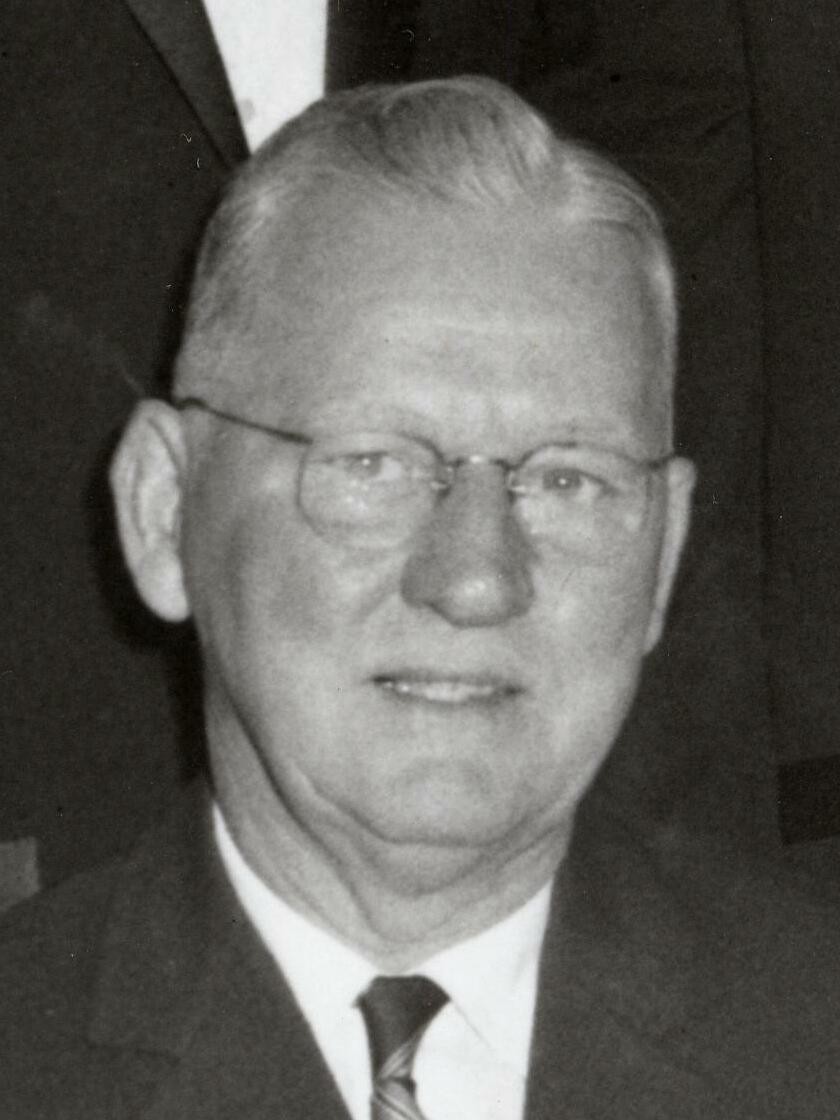

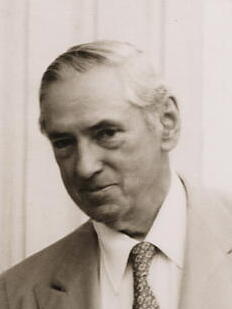
Candidate	John B. Hynes	James Michael Curley
Party	Nonpartisan	Nonpartisan
Popular vote	154,206	76,354
Percentage	66.88%	33.12%
Mayor before election
John B. Hynes
Elected mayor
John B. Hynes

The Boston mayoral election of 1951 occurred on Tuesday, November 6, 1951, between Mayor of Boston John B. Hynes and former Mayor James Michael Curley. Hynes was elected to his second term.

This was the first Boston mayoral race with a preliminary election, which was held on Tuesday, September 25, 1951. In November 1949, voters had approved changing the structure of future mayoral contests to include a preliminary election, non-partisan in nature, to select two final candidates in advance of each general election, which would remain non-partisan. It also shifted the years in which elections would be held. The first such election had been set for 1951, meaning that Hynes' previous term was only two years in duration.

Inaugural exercises were held Monday, January 7, 1952.

== Candidates ==
- James Michael Curley, Mayor of Boston from 1914 to 1918, 1922 to 1926, 1930 to 1934, 1946 to 1950. Member of the United States House of Representatives from 1913 to 1914 and from 1943 to 1947. Governor of Massachusetts from 1935 to 1937. Member of the Massachusetts House of Representatives from 1902 to 1903.
- John B. Hynes, Mayor of Boston, Massachusetts since 1950, Acting Mayor in 1947.

=== Candidates eliminated in preliminary ===
- Thomas J. O'Brien, resident of Roxbury.
- Joseph F. Timilty, Boston Police Commissioner from 1936 to 1943.

== Results ==
Candidates	Preliminary Election		General Election	
Candidates	Votes	%	Votes	%
John B. Hynes (incumbent)	108,414	53.41	154,206	66.88
James Michael Curley	77,268	38.07	76,354	33.12
Joseph F. Timilty	15,890	7.83		
Thomas J. O'Brien	1,406	0.69		

=== General election results by ward ===
Ward	Hynes		Curley	
Ward	Votes	%	Votes	%
1	6,436	56.19	5,017	43.81
2	3,251	49.30	3,343	50.70
3	6,228	60.59	4,051	39.41
4	6,147	73.41	2,226	26.59
5	8,366	80.66	2,006	19.34
6	4,882	51.27	4,641	48.73
7	6,634	57.18	4,967	42.82
8	3,319	45.36	3,999	54.64
9	4,133	54.81	3,408	45.19
10	4,970	51.67	4,649	48.33
11	4,766	54.89	3,917	45.11
12	7,061	73.58	2,536	26.42
13	5,511	61.27	3,483	38.73
14	10,983	80.57	2,648	19.43
15	5,411	62.26	3,280	37.74
16	8,821	72.55	3,338	27.45
17	8,824	75.41	2,878	24.59
18	11,060	72.95	4,101	27.05
19	7,428	68.08	3,483	31.92
20	12,528	80.54	3,027	19.46
21	9,797	80.84	2,322	19.16
22	7,650	71.60	3,034	28.40

== See also ==
- List of mayors of Boston, Massachusetts
