= 1975 Boston mayoral election =

Election in Massachusetts, United States

- November 4, 1975
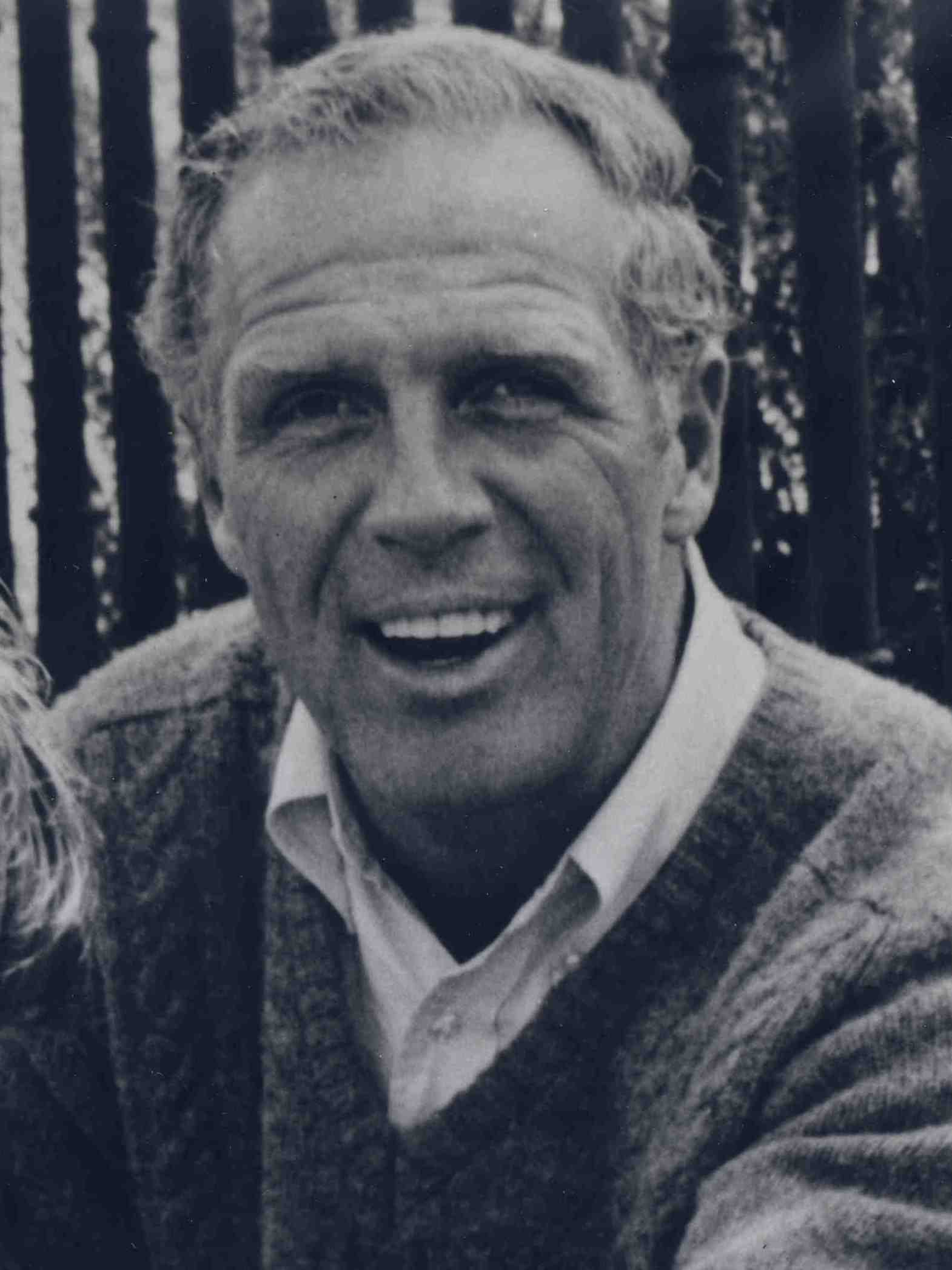

Candidate	Kevin White	Joseph F. Timilty
Party	Nonpartisan	Nonpartisan
Popular vote	81,058	73,622
Percentage	52.40%	47.59%
- Results by ward White: 50–60% 60–70% 70–80% 80–90% Timilty: 50–60% 60–70%
Mayor before election
Kevin White
Elected mayor
Kevin White

The Boston mayoral election of 1975 occurred on Tuesday, November 4, 1975, between Mayor Kevin White and state senator Joseph F. Timilty. White was elected to a third term.

The nonpartisan municipal preliminary election was held on September 23, 1975.

== Candidates ==
- Joseph F. Timilty, member of the Massachusetts Senate since 1972. Member of the Boston City Council from 1967 to 1971.
- Kevin White, Mayor of Boston since 1968, Massachusetts Secretary of the Commonwealth from 1961 to 1967.

=== Candidates eliminated in the primary ===
- Robert Gibbons, member of the U.S. Labor Party.
- Norman Oliver, member of the Socialist Workers Party.

=== Candidates who withdrew before the primary ===
- Raymond Flynn, member of the Massachusetts House of Representatives (withdrew in favor of running for city council)

== Results ==
Candidates	Preliminary Election		General Election	
Candidates	Votes	%	Votes	%
Kevin White (incumbent)	49,248	54.45	81,058	52.40
Joseph F. Timilty	38,997	43.12	73,622	47.59
Norman Oliver	1,190	1.32		
Robert Gibbons	1,002	1.11		

== See also ==
- List of mayors of Boston, Massachusetts
