= Joseph F. Timilty (state senator) =

American politician (1938–2017)

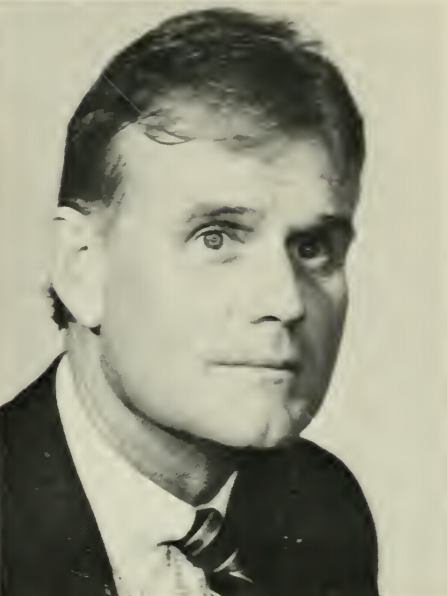
- Official portrait, circa 1983

Member of the Massachusetts Senate
- In office May 3, 1972 – January 3, 1985
- Preceded by: Samuel Harmon
- Succeeded by: William R. Keating
- Constituency: Fifth Suffolk (1972-1974); Norfolk and Suffolk (1975-1984)

Member of the Boston City Council
- In office 1967–1971

Personal details
- Born: October 3, 1938 Boston, Massachusetts, U.S.
- Died: December 22, 2017 (aged 79) Canton, Massachusetts, U.S.
- Party: Democratic
- Spouse: Elaine
- Children: 6, including James and Kelly
- Education: Providence College

Military service
- Branch/service: United States Marine Corps
- Battles/wars: 1958 Lebanon crisis

Joseph F. Timilty (October 3, 1938 – December 22, 2017) was an American politician.

== Political career ==
Timilty was born in Boston, Massachusetts. He was a member of the Boston City Council from 1967 to 1971 and served in the Massachusetts Senate from 1972 to 1985. Timilty was a Democrat.

Timilty was a candidate for Mayor of Boston in 1971, 1975 and 1979.

Eight years after leaving office, on January 27, 1993, Timilty was indicted on one count of conspiracy to commit wire fraud. On August 31, 1993, he was sentenced to four months in prison and two years of probation.

In 2001, he was a candidate in the special election to fill the vacancy in the 9th congressional district caused by the death of Joe Moakley. He dropped out of the race due to fundraising issues.

== Personal life ==
Timilty's grandfather James P. Timilty was a state senator and the namesake of the James P. Timilty Middle School in Boston. His uncle Joseph F. Timilty was Boston Police Commissioner from 1936 to 1943. His son, James E. Timilty is a former State Senator and now Treasurer of Norfolk County, and his nephew, Walter Timilty Jr. is a State Senator. His daughter, Kelly Timilty, was a member of the Massachusetts Governor's Council. His brother, Walter F. Timilty Sr. is the Clerk of Courts in Norfolk County. Timilty went to Providence College. He served in the United States Marine Corps. He was involved with his family's laundry business and with the real estate business. Timilty also served as a teaching fellow at the John F. Kennedy School of Government. He died of cancer at his home in Canton, Massachusetts.
