= Joseph F. Timilty (police commissioner) =

American police commissioner (1894–1980)

7th Commissioner of the Boston Police Department
- In office November 25, 1936 – March 27, 1943
- Mayor: James Michael Curley
- Preceded by: Eugene M. McSweeney
- Succeeded by: Thomas S. J. Kavanagh (acting)
- In office June 5, 1943 – November 25, 1943
- Preceded by: Thomas S. J. Kavanagh (acting)
- Succeeded by: Thomas F. Sullivan

Personal details
- Resting place: Forest Hills Cemetery
- Parent: James P. Timilty (father)

Joseph F. Timilty (October 17, 1894 – October 2, 1980) was an American law enforcement officer and politician who served as Boston Police Commissioner from 1936 to 1943.

Timilty was appointed police commissioner by Governor James Michael Curley on November 25, 1936. Prior to accepting the position, Timilty was a member of the Governor's military staff.

He was police commissioner during the Cocoanut Grove fire.

On March 27, 1943, Timilty and six of his subordinates were indicted on charges of conspiracy to permit the operation of gambling houses and the registration of bets. Immediately after the indictment he was placed on leave by Governor Leverett Saltonstall. The indictment was quashed and on June 5 Timilty returned to duty. He was re-indicted on June 25. On July 2, Judge Frank J. Donahue quashed the second indictment. Governor Saltonstall chose not to re-appoint Timilty and on November 25, 1943, Timilty's tenure as Police Commissioner ended.

Timilty was a candidate for Mayor of Boston in 1951. He finished a distant third in the primary behind incumbent John Hynes and former mayor James Michael Curley.

Timilty died on October 2, 1980, in Bal Harbour, Florida.

== See also ==
- The Timilty family

Police appointments
Preceded by Eugene M. McSweeney	Commissioner of the Boston Police Department; November 25, 1936-March 27, 1943	Succeeded by Thomas S. J. Kavanagh
Preceded by Thomas S. J. Kavanagh	Commissioner of the Boston Police Department; June 5, 1943-November 25, 1943	Succeeded by Thomas F. Sullivan
