= Kelly Timilty =

American politician

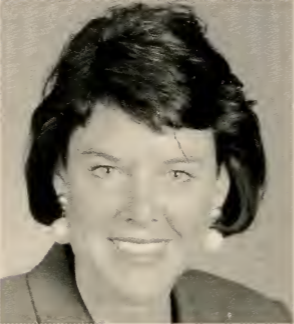

Member of the Massachusetts Governor's Council for the 2nd District
- In office 1995 – January 31, 2012
- Preceded by: Edward Patrick Foley
- Succeeded by: Robert Jubinville

Personal details
- Born: Kelly Ann Timilty; October 14, 1962 Boston, Massachusetts
- Died: January 31, 2012 (aged 49) Dedham, Massachusetts
- Political party: Democratic
- Parent: Joseph F. Timilty (father)
- Education: University of Maryland (BA)

Kelly Ann Timilty (October 14, 1962 – January 31, 2012) was an American politician.

== Biography ==
Timilty was born in Boston, Massachusetts. She went to St. Gregory's Grammar School in Dorchester, Massachusetts and to the Newton Country Day School. Timilty received her bachelor's degree from the University of Maryland, College Park in 1986. She worked as an aide for Congressman Joe Moakley of Massachusetts. Timilty lived in West Roxbury, Massachusetts. Timilty served on the Massachusetts Governor's Council from 1995 until her death in 2012. She was a Democrat. In 2008, Timilty was fined $8,000 for violating Massachusetts campaign laws when she falsely claimed in her campaign literature that Massachusetts Governor Deval Patrick was endorsing her. Timilty died in Dedham, Massachusetts after a short illness. Her father was Joseph F. Timilty who served in the Massachusetts Senate. Her husband was James "Jim" L. Mandeville.
