= James E. Timilty =

American politician

Jim Timilty
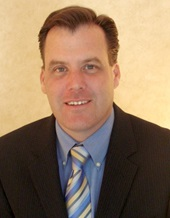

Treasurer of Norfolk County, Massachusetts
- In office May 2, 2017 – January 6, 2021
- Preceded by: Joseph A. Connolly
- Succeeded by: Michael G. Bellotti

Member of the Massachusetts Senate from the Bristol and Norfolk district
- In office January 5, 2005 – April 28, 2017
- Preceded by: Jo Ann Sprague
- Succeeded by: Paul Feeney

Personal details
- Born: August 3, 1970 (age 56) Boston, MA
- Party: Democratic
- Education: Saint Louis University

James E. Timilty (born August 3, 1970, in Boston, Massachusetts) is an American politician who served as a Massachusetts state senator for the Bristol and Norfolk district, which included his hometown of Walpole and several other towns. He is a Democrat who served from 2005 to 2017.

During his tenure in the State Senate, he was generally considered among the more moderate members of his party in the heavily Democratic state, voting against an increase in the state sales tax in 2009, supporting roll backs of the income tax and sales tax in subsequent years, and voting against changing state law to allow Governor Deval Patrick to fill a vacancy in a US Senate seat. During the 2012 U.S. Senate election in Massachusetts, he remained neutral and was known to be friendly with incumbent Republican Scott Brown, from their time in the legislature. Timilty's voting record may have also reflected that he represented a district that was generally among the more moderate in the state.

On April 12, 2017, following the departure of Joseph Connolly as Norfolk County Treasurer, he was appointed to serve the remaining two years of a six-year term; he submitted a letter of resignation from the Senate effective April 28, 2017. His appointment as county treasurer was effective May 2, 2017. He endorsed his former Chief of Staff, Paul Feeney, to replace him in the special election.

He won re-election unopposed in 2018, but declined to run again for a six-year term in 2020.

He is the son of former state senator Joseph F. Timilty.

== See also ==
- The Timilty family
