= James P. Timilty =

American politician

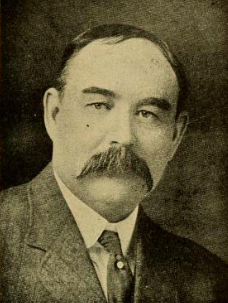
- Timilty in 1916

Member of the Massachusetts Senate from the Seventh Suffolk district
- In office 1910–1916
- Preceded by: John J. Butler
- Succeeded by: Charles S. Lawler

Member of the Boston Board of Aldermen for the 6th District
- In office 1908–1909

Personal details
- Born: March 28, 1865 Boston, Massachusetts, U.S.
- Died: July 6, 1921 (aged 57) Sharon, Massachusetts, U.S.
- Party: Democratic Party
- Children: 5, including Joseph
- Nickname: Diamond Jim

James P. "Jim" Timilty (March 28, 1865 – July 6, 1921) was an American politician, labor leader, and contractor. He was a prominent figure in Boston's Democratic politics for over two decades, particularly in the Roxbury neighborhood. He is best known for his tenure in the Massachusetts Senate, his leadership in labor organizing, and his role as a community advocate.

== Early life ==
Timilty was born on March 28, 1864 in Boston, Massachusetts, and raised in Roxbury. He attended the Vernon Street Primary School and the Washington Street Grammar School. In 1890, Timilty began working for the Boston City Paving Department, earning $2 a day. He advanced through the ranks to become a sub-foreman, then a foreman, and later the district foreman of the South End Paving Yard by 1903. During this time, he became actively involved in labor organization, serving as the president of the Pavers' Union for over 25 years.

== Political career ==
Timilty began his political career with his election to the Boston Board of Aldermen in 1908, where he served until 1909. In 1910, he was elected to the Massachusetts Senate for the Seventh Suffolk District, serving six consecutive terms until 1916. Throughout his time in office, Timilty was known as a strong advocate for labor rights and infrastructure improvements. He supported legislation that benefitted working-class Bostonians, drawing on his own experiences as a labor leader and contractor.

Timilty's political base was primarily in Roxbury, where he maintained significant influence within the Democratic Party. He was regarded as a political boss, noted for his ability to mobilize support and maintain control over local politics. He played a key role in several mayoral campaigns, including John F. Fitzgerald's victory over Edward J. Donovan in 1905, and Andrew J. Peters's victory over James Michael Curley in 1917. Timilty's last bid for office was for the Massachusetts Governor's Council, but he was defeated.

In his time in the State Senate, Timilty developed an intimate friendship with then-Senate President Calvin Coolidge.

== Personal life and legacy ==
Timilty was known as "Diamond Jim" for his habit of wearing large diamonds, a reflection of his colorful public persona. Despite his tough reputation in politics, he was well liked within his community, often described as approachable and jovial, with a strong sense of camaraderie. Many in Roxbury viewed him as both a leader and a benefactor, known for securing jobs, housing, and welfare for his constituents.

He retired from active politics after his defeat for the Governor's Council, though he remained a significant behind-the-scenes figure in Boston politics. Timilty died on July 6, 1921, at his summer home in Sharon, Massachusetts, following a prolonged illness. He was survived by his five sons: Joseph, Frank, Charles, Watler, and Harold.

The James P. Timilty Middle School in Roxbury was named in his honor, reflecting his lasting impact on the community. However, in 2021, the Boston School Committee voted to close the school as part of a district-wide phase-out of middle schools.

== See also ==
- 1913 Massachusetts legislature
- 1915 Massachusetts legislature
- 1916 Massachusetts legislature
- 1917 Massachusetts legislature
