= 1948 United States Senate election in Massachusetts =

- November 2, 1948
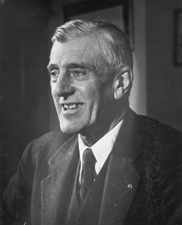

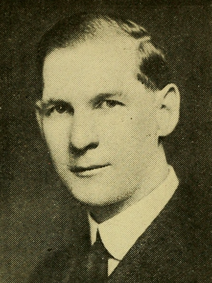
Nominee	Leverett Saltonstall	John I. Fitzgerald
Party	Republican	Democratic
Popular vote	1,088,475	954,398
Percentage	52.95%	46.43%
- Saltonstall: 50–60% 60–70% 70–80% 80–90% >90% Fitzgerald: 50–60% 60–70% 70–80%
Senator before election
Leverett Saltonstall
Republican
Elected Senator
Leverett Saltonstall
Republican

The United States Senate election of 1948 in Massachusetts was held on November 2, 1948. Republican incumbent Leverett Saltonstall was re-elected to a second term in office over John I. Fitzgerald.

== Republican primary ==
=== Candidates ===
- Leverett Saltonstall, incumbent U.S. senator since 1945

=== Results ===
Senator Saltonstall was unopposed for renomination.

== Democratic primary ==
=== Candidates ===
- John I. Fitzgerald, former Boston fire commissioner and member of the Boston City Council
- Francis D. Harrigan, Boston attorney and candidate for governor in 1946
- Joseph A. Langone Jr., Boston election commissioner and former state senator
- John D. Lynch, member of the Cambridge City Council and former mayor of Cambridge
- Richard M. Russell, former U.S. representative and mayor of Cambridge

=== Results ===
Democratic primary
Party	Candidate	Votes	%
Democratic	John I. Fitzgerald	79,663	30.26%
Democratic	Richard M. Russell	64,191	24.39%
Democratic	Francis D. Harrigan	44,395	16.87%
Democratic	John D. Lynch	42,087	15.98%
Democratic	Joseph A. Langone, Jr.	32,895	12.50%
Total votes		263,231	100.00%

== General election ==
=== Candidates ===
- Henning A. Blomen, perennial candidate (Socialist Labor)
- John I. Fitzgerald, former Boston fire commissioner and member of the Boston City Council (Democratic)
- Leverett Saltonstall, incumbent U.S. senator since 1945 (Republican)
- E. Tallmadge Root, nominee for Senate in 1944 and governor in 1940 (Prohibition)

=== Results ===
General election
Party	Candidate	Votes	%	±%
Republican	Leverett Saltonstall (incumbent)	1,088,475	52.95%	▼11.34
Democratic	John I. Fitzgerald	954,398	46.43%	▲11.53
Socialist Labor	Henning A. Blomen	9,266	0.44%	▼0.20
Prohibition	E. Tallmadge Root	3,652	0.18%	▲0.01
Total votes		2,055,791	100.00%	

== See also ==
- United States Senate elections, 1948 and 1949
