= Massachusetts House of Representatives' 15th Middlesex district =

American legislative district

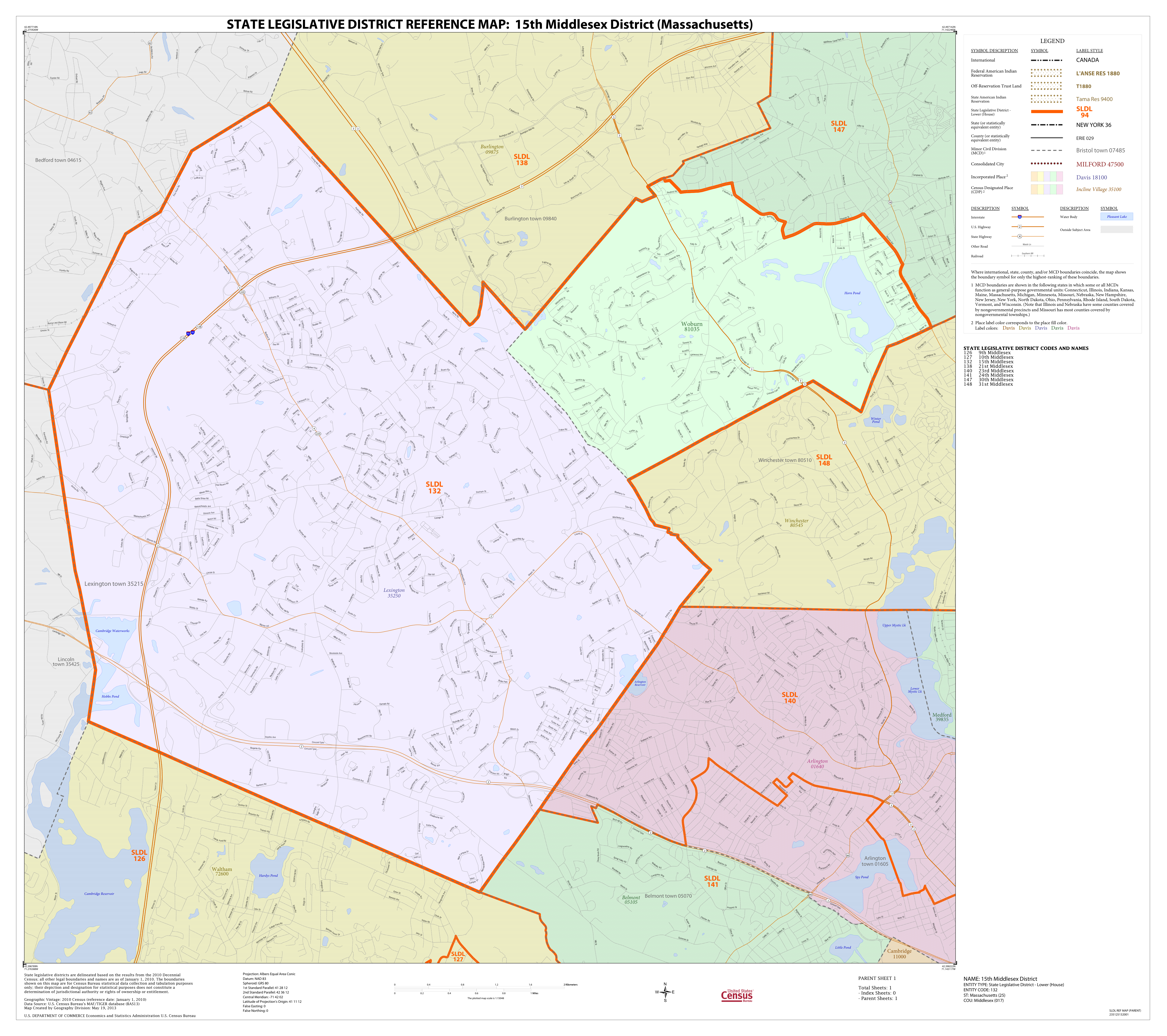
Map of Massachusetts House of Representatives' 15th Middlesex district, based on the 2010 United States census.

Massachusetts House of Representatives' 15th Middlesex district in the United States is one of 160 legislative districts included in the lower house of the Massachusetts General Court. It covers part of Middlesex County. Democrat Michelle Ciccolo of Lexington has represented the district since 2019.

== Locales represented ==
The district includes the following localities:

- Lexington
- part of Woburn

The current district geographic boundary overlaps with those of the Massachusetts Senate's 3rd Middlesex and 4th Middlesex districts.

=== Former locales ===
The district previously covered:

- Ashland, circa 1872
- Hopkinton, circa 1872

== Representatives ==
- Leander E. Wakefield, circa 1858
- John Phelps, circa 1859
- Samuel Walker McCall, circa 1888
- Henry Achin Jr., circa 1920
- Adelard Berard, circa 1920
- Victor Francis Jewett, circa 1920
- Cornelius Desmond, 1941–1962
- James J. Bruin, 1949
- James O'Dea Jr., 1949–1957
- Patrick Francis Plunkett, circa 1951
- Cornelius T. Finnegan Jr., 1957–1965
- Richard Edward Landry, circa 1975
- John Janas, 1963–1969
- Lincoln Porteous Cole, Jr.
- Stephen W. Doran, 1981-1995
- Jay R. Kaufman
- Michelle Ciccolo, 2019-current

== See also ==
- List of Massachusetts House of Representatives elections
- List of Massachusetts General Courts
- List of former districts of the Massachusetts House of Representatives
- Other Middlesex County districts of the Massachusetts House of Representatives: 1st, 2nd, 3rd, 4th, 5th, 6th, 7th, 8th, 9th, 10th, 11th, 12th, 13th, 14th, 16th, 17th, 18th, 19th, 20th, 21st, 22nd, 23rd, 24th, 25th, 26th, 27th, 28th, 29th, 30th, 31st, 32nd, 33rd, 34th, 35th, 36th, 37th

== Images ==
Portraits of legislators

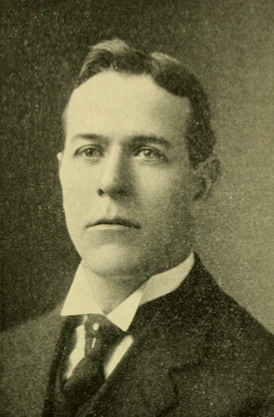
John Meehan

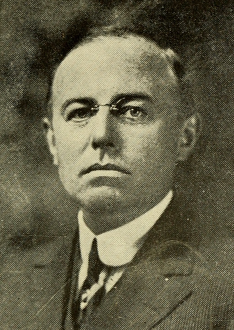
Frank Putnam

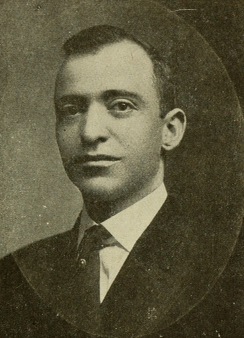
Henry Achin

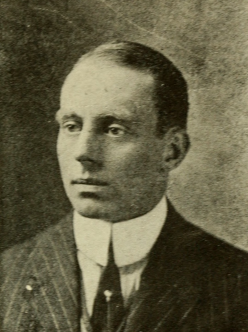
Victor Jewett

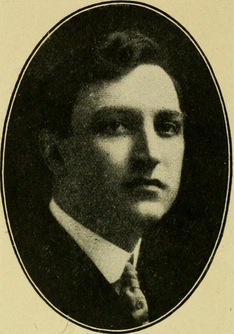
Fred Oliver Lewis

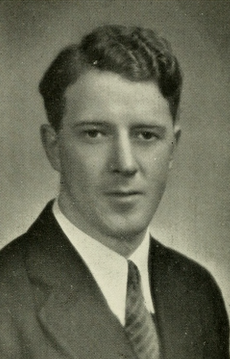
George Ashe

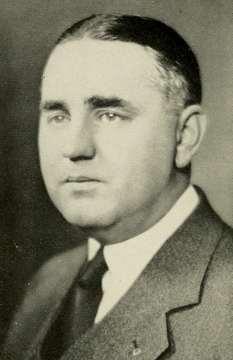
Thomas Delmore

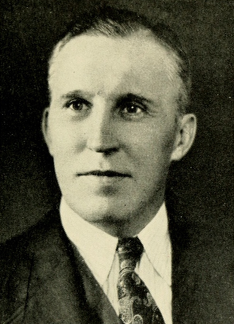
Cornelius Desmond

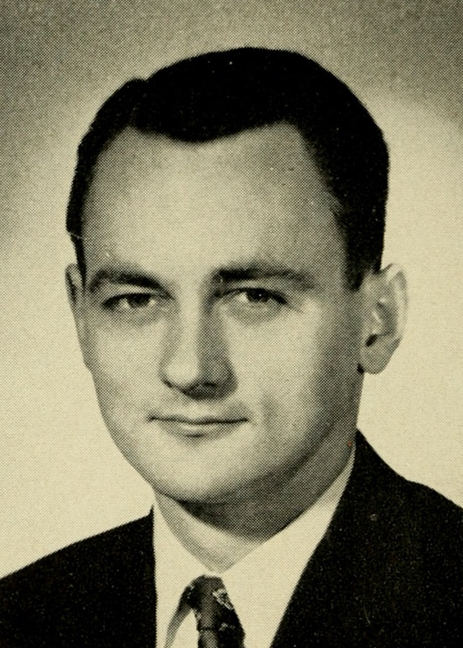
James Lawrence O'Dea

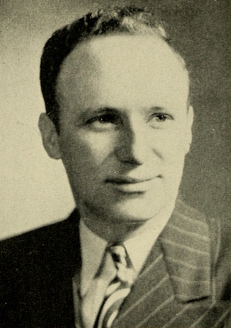
Patrick Francis Plunkett

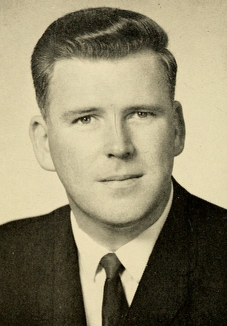
John Desmond

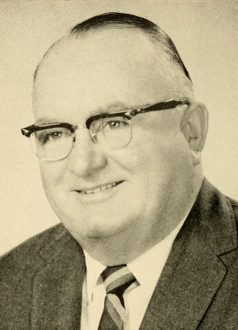
John Janas

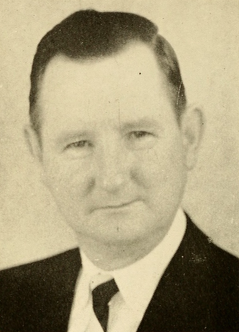
Raymond Rourke

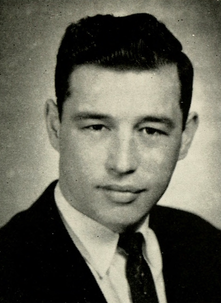
Richard Landry

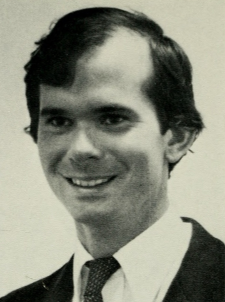
Stephen Doran

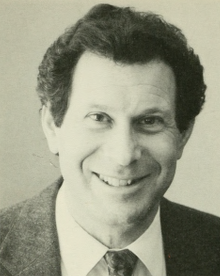
Jay Kaufman
