= William G. Andrew =

American lawyer and politician (1886–1965)

Member of the Middlesex County, Massachusetts County Commission
- In office 1945–1965

District Attorney of Middlesex County, Massachusetts
- In office 1938–1939
- Preceded by: Warren L. Bishop
- Succeeded by: Robert F. Bradford

Personal details
- Born: January 25, 1886 Cambridge, Massachusetts, U.S.
- Died: May 6, 1965 (aged 79) Boston, Massachusetts, U.S.
- Resting place: Mount Auburn Cemetery; Cambridge, Massachusetts
- Party: Republican
- Education: Boston College; Suffolk Law School
- Occupation: Attorney

William G. Andrew (January 25, 1886 – May 6, 1965) was an American attorney and politician who was a member of the Middlesex County, Massachusetts county commission from 1945 to 1965 and interim district attorney of Middlesex County from 1938 to 1939.

== Early life ==
Andrew was born in Cambridge, Massachusetts. He was of Portuguese descent and spoke English, Portuguese, Italian, Polish, French, and Yiddish. He graduated from Cambridge High and Latin School, Boston College, and Suffolk Law School. He was admitted to the bar in 1911.

== District attorney's office ==
Andrew was a special assistant district attorney under Arthur Kenneth Reading and first assistant district attorney under Warren L. Bishop. After Robert F. Bradford defeated Bishop in the Republican primary, Bishop backed Democrat Joseph V. Carroll. As a result, Andrew resigned from the DAs office and endorsed Bradford. Bishop unexpectedly resigned on November 23, 1938 and, at Bishop's request, Governor Charles F. Hurley appointed Andrew to finish the final months of the district attorney's term.

== Unsuccessful runs for office ==
Andrew was an unsuccessful candidate for the Cambridge school committee in 1914, mayor of Cambridge in 1915, Middlesex County register of probate in 1926, Massachusetts State Treasurer in 1936, and the Massachusetts Governor's Council in 1944. He was the Republican nominee for Massachusetts State Auditor in the 1950 election. He lost to Democratic incumbent Thomas J. Buckley 59% to 40%. He was the Republican nominee for district attorney in 1958 and 1962, but lost to Democratic incumbents (James O'Dea Jr. in 1958 and John J. Droney in 1962) both times.

== Middlesex County commission ==
Andrew was elected to the Middlesex County commission in 1944 and remained on the commission until his death on May 6, 1965.

Party political offices
Preceded by Russell A. Wood	Republican nominee for Auditor of Massachusetts; 1950	Succeeded by David J. Mintz
