= Paul A. Dever =

American politician (1903–1958)

Paul Dever
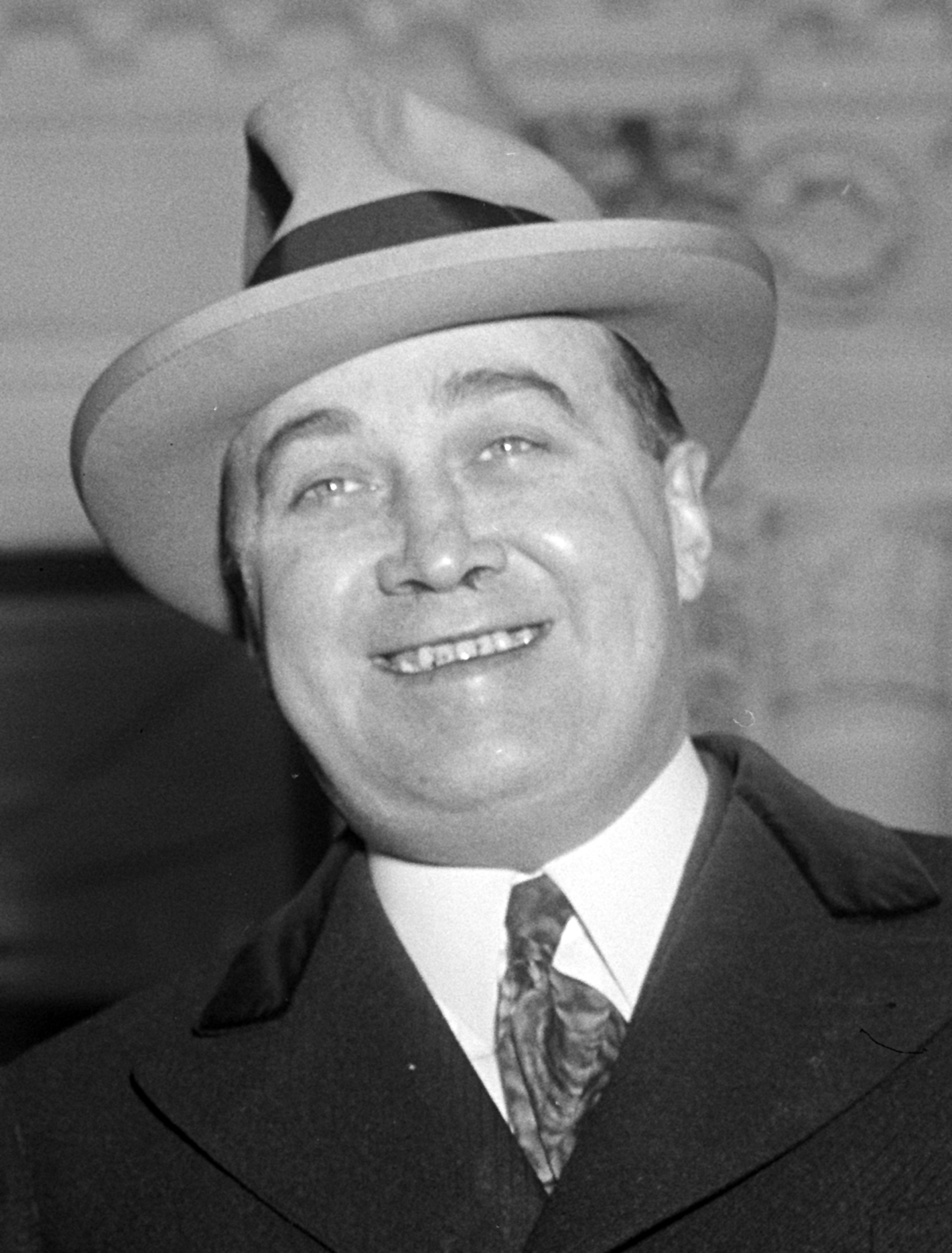

58th Governor of Massachusetts
- In office January 6, 1949 – January 8, 1953
- Lieutenant: Charles F. Sullivan
- Preceded by: Robert F. Bradford
- Succeeded by: Christian Herter

29th Attorney General of the Commonwealth of Massachusetts
- In office January 3, 1935 – January 3, 1941
- Governor: James Michael Curley; Charles F. Hurley; Leverett Saltonstall
- Preceded by: Joseph E. Warner
- Succeeded by: Robert T. Bushnell

Personal details
- Born: Paul Andrew Dever; January 15, 1903 Boston, Massachusetts, U.S.
- Died: April 11, 1958 (aged 55) Boston, Massachusetts, U.S.
- Party: Democratic
- Education: Northeastern University; Boston University (LLB)

Military service
- Allegiance: United States
- Branch/service: United States Navy
- Years of service: 1942–1945
- Rank: Lieutenant commander
- Battles/wars: World War II

Paul Andrew Dever (January 15, 1903 – April 11, 1958) was an American Democratic politician from Boston, Massachusetts. He served as the 58th governor of Massachusetts and was its youngest-ever attorney general. Among his notable accomplishments was the construction of Boston’s circumferential highway Route 128, then called "Dever’s Folley," which was later expanded to Interstate 95, one of the most used national highways.

== Early life ==
Paul Dever was born in Boston, Massachusetts to two Irish immigrants, Joseph and Anna MacAlevy Dever. His father died when he was eight, and he took odd jobs as a youth to help the family make ends meet. He attended Boston public schools, including Boston Latin School. He attended Northeastern University for a time, but then transferred to Boston University, from whose law school he graduated with an LL.B. in 1926 with high honors. He was admitted to the bar, and joined the practice of Harvey Boutwell, a blind attorney whose need to have papers read aloud furthered Dever's oratorical skills.

He served as the grand knight of the Mt. Pleasant Council of the Knights of Columbus. He was also the godfather to one of State Deputy Thomas J. Spring's children. He appointed Spring to a judgeship in Roxbury District Court.

== Early political career ==
Dever was long interested in politics, having observed his uncle John, a leading figure in Massachusetts Democratic Party politics. He served for some time as an aide to Senator David I. Walsh, one of the state's most prominent Democratic politicians. Dever was elected to the Massachusetts House of Representatives for the 3rd Middlesex district in 1928, and served from 1929 to 1935 in a district representing Cambridge that had historically been Republican.

In 1934 Dever was elected Attorney General, and was at age 31 the youngest to hold that office. Among his claimed successes were a 95% conviction rate, and the closure of a significant number of lenders engaging in usurious lending practices. He also identified under- or mis-utilized trust funds, including one which was eventually used for construction of the Hatch Shell on Boston's Charles River Esplanade. In 1940, he challenged the popular incumbent Governor Leverett Saltonstall for his seat, losing by a margin of 0.3%.

== World War II ==
In 1942, Dever enlisted in the United States Navy for World War II. He was subsequently commissioned a lieutenant commander, and served in the North Atlantic, European and African Sectors until his discharge at the end of the war in 1945. Assignments included command of the Marine Corps contingent at Argentia, Newfoundland and Labrador, and the delivery of election ballots to military posts. After the war, he continued to serve in the military reserve, and was eventually promoted to commander.

== Governor of Massachusetts ==
Dever lost the 1946 race for lieutenant governor, but two years later he defeated incumbent governor Robert F. Bradford in a Democratic landslide, which saw that party gain complete control of the state for the first time in the 20th century. He was the state's 58th governor, and won election to a second term in 1950, defeating the Republican candidate, former Lieutenant Governor Arthur W. Coolidge.

During his tenure, Dever increased state aid to schools and issued an executive order to extend higher education benefits to Korean War veterans. Among his chief concerns were civil defense and resisting domestic communism. He supported legislation requiring school teachers to take loyalty oaths, and he advocated increasing old age and workers compensation insurance. He also introduced a graduated income tax, and introduced measures which head intended to improve the care and education of the state's mentally handicapped.

A major statewide transportation infrastructure initiative, developed by Governor Bradford, was passed during his term. Under this plan, the state constructed Massachusetts Route 128, the Central Artery, and Storrow Drive. The first bond issue for this work was passed early in his term; it had previously been rejected by the Democratic legislature in Bradford's tenure. This and other major spending initiatives greatly exceeded the amount raised by new tax levies, and marked the start of an extended period of deficit spending by the state. In Dever's second term, transportation spending was further expanded, and he established the Massachusetts Turnpike Commission, which funded construction of the Massachusetts Turnpike through bonds paid off by tolls.

Another major initiative undertaken during Dever's period in office was a significant expansion of the state's facilities for the mentally handicapped, which had suffered for many years from overcrowding and understaffing. Among the facilities built was the Myles Standish State School for the Mentally Retarded in Taunton, which was renamed the Paul A. Dever State School in his honor after his death.

In 1952, Dever made an unsuccessful bid for the Democratic presidential nomination. Dever was also the keynote speaker at the 1952 Democratic National Convention; his speech, one of the first such speeches to be televised, made the portly Dever look bad. Also that year, the Dever administration came under fire when the Massachusetts Federation of Taxpayers Associations found that pensions for members and former members of the state legislature had been increased. One of those eligible was former Mayor of Boston and Governor James Michael Curley, a convicted felon. Dever gave in to pressure groups, calling a special session of the legislature that repealed the bill.

Dever had built a strong political machine in Massachusetts, and was widely considered a potential candidate for the United States Senate in 1952, which was also sought by John F. Kennedy. After informing Kennedy that he was interested in running again for governor, the two established a joint campaign committee. Kennedy maintained a distance from Dever and his campaign, and was able to capture the Senate seat in the election, which was otherwise a major victory for Republicans. Republican Christian Herter defeated Dever in a narrow win, assisted by the long coattails of Presidential winner Dwight David Eisenhower, and discontent among the state's ethnic Democrats for Adlai Stevenson, the Democratic presidential nominee. After Dever's death, associates of his alleged that the publisher of the Boston Post pressured Dever to arrange a loan in exchange for the newspaper's endorsement.

== Death and burial ==
After leaving office Dever returned to practicing law. He attempted to remain active in politics, supporting Stevenson in the 1956 presidential race, even though most state party leaders did not believe Stevenson's chances against Eisenhower were any better than they had been in 1952.

Dever was a lifelong bachelor, who lived for many years in Cambridge with his sister Marie. She served as his First Lady during his tenure as governor. He suffered from heart disease in his later years, and died of a heart attack on April 11, 1958. He was buried in St. Joseph Cemetery in the West Roxbury section of Boston.

== Sources ==
- Hannan, Caryn, ed. (2008). Massachusetts Biographical Dictionary. Hamburg, MI: State History Publications. ISBN 9781878592668. OCLC 198759744.
- Hogarty, Richard (2002). Massachusetts Politics and Public Policy: Studies in Power and Leadership. Amherst, MA: University of Massachusetts Press. ISBN 9781558493513. OCLC 48655943.
- Lapomarda, Vincent A. (1992). The Knights of Columbus in Massachusetts (second ed.). Norwood, Massachusetts: Knights of Columbus Massachusetts State Council.
- Nelson, Garrison (2017). John William McCormack: A Political Biography. Bloomsbury. ISBN 9781628925173.
- O'Connor, Thomas (1995). Building a New Boston: Politics and Urban Renewal, 1950-1970. Boston: University Press of New England. ISBN 9781555532468. OCLC 231793654.
- Savage, Sean (2012). JFK, LBJ, and the Democratic Party. Albany: SUNY Press. ISBN 9781423740223. OCLC 62386293.

Legal offices
Preceded by Joseph E. Warner	Attorney General of Massachusetts; 1935–1941	Succeeded by Robert T. Bushnell
Party political offices
Preceded by John P. Buckley	Democratic nominee for Attorney General of Massachusetts; 1934, 1936, 1938	Succeeded by James Henry Brennan
Preceded by James Michael Curley	Democratic nominee for Governor of Massachusetts; 1940	Succeeded by Roger Putnam
Preceded by John B. Carr	Democratic nominee for Lieutenant Governor of Massachusetts; 1946	Succeeded by Charles F. Sullivan
Preceded by Maurice J. Tobin	Democratic nominee for Governor of Massachusetts; 1948, 1950, 1952	Succeeded by Robert Murphy
Preceded by Alben W. Barkley	Keynote Speaker of the Democratic National Convention; 1952	Succeeded by Frank G. Clement
Political offices
Preceded by Robert F. Bradford	Governor of Massachusetts; 1949–1953	Succeeded by Christian Herter
