= Ephraim Martin =

American attorney and postmaster (1900-1988)

Postmaster of Boston
- In office 1958–1969
- Preceded by: Joseph P. W. Finn
- Succeeded by: George K. Walker

District Attorney of Middlesex County, Massachusetts
- In office 1956–1957
- Preceded by: George E. Thompson
- Succeeded by: James O'Dea Jr.

Personal details
- Born: April 6, 1900 Brooklyn, New York, U.S.
- Died: September 8, 1988 (aged 88) Belmont, Massachusetts, U.S.
- Resting place: Mount Auburn Cemetery; Cambridge, Massachusetts, U.S.
- Party: Republican
- Spouse: Mildred Kindley (1926–1988; her death)
- Children: 1
- Education: Boston University School of Law
- Occupation: Attorney

Ephraim Martin Jr. (April 6, 1900 – September 8, 1988) was an American attorney who served as district attorney of Middlesex County, Massachusetts, and postmaster of Boston.

== Early life ==
Martin was born in Brooklyn and raised in Derry, New Hampshire. He graduated from the Pinkerton Academy, where he was a member of the football, baseball, and track teams. He served in the United States Navy during World War I and was an officer in the United States Navy Reserve. On July 22, 1926, Martin married Mildred Kindley, a native of Tyler, Texas, who graduated from Emerson College and worked as an elocution teacher. They had one son, Ephraim Martin III.

== Legal career ==
Martin graduated from the Boston University School of Law in 1922. From 1932 to 1952 he was a lecturer and instructor at the Boston University School of Law. In 1938 he was named first assistant district attorney of Middlesex County by district attorney-elect Robert F. Bradford. He returned to the Navy during World War II then served as a military aide to Governor Robert F. Bradford from 1946 to 1947. After the war, Martin returned to the DA's office, which was now led by George E. Thompson. In 1956, Thompson was made a justice of the Massachusetts Superior Court and Governor Christian Herter appointed Martin to succeed him. Martin ran for a full term, but was defeated by James O'Dea Jr., who became the first Democrat to hold the DA's office in Middlesex County since William J. Corcoran in 1917. The Democrats also took control of the county commission and retained the sheriff's office in what The Boston Globe described as "a major county upset of the election".

== Postmaster ==
In 1958, on the recommendation of Senator Leverett Saltonstall, Martin was appointed postmaster of the Boston Postal District. In this role, Martin oversaw 92 postal facilities in 52 Greater Boston communities. He led the district during the nationwide rollout of the ZIP Code. In 1966 he was named postmaster of the year. In 1969, Martin was appointed regional postal director for New England, which made him responsible for 1,846 post offices. He was director during the U.S. postal strike of 1970, which saw postal workers in multiple cities (including Worcester, Providence, Lowell, Peabody, and Woburn) walk off the job to protest low wages. He retired from the United States Post Office Department on April 30, 1970.

== Later life ==
After leaving the post office, Martin became a member of the firm of Martin, Magnuson, McCarthy, and Kenney. He died on September 8, 1988, at his home in Belmont, Massachusetts. He was 88 years old.
