= 1940 Massachusetts gubernatorial election =

- November 5, 1940
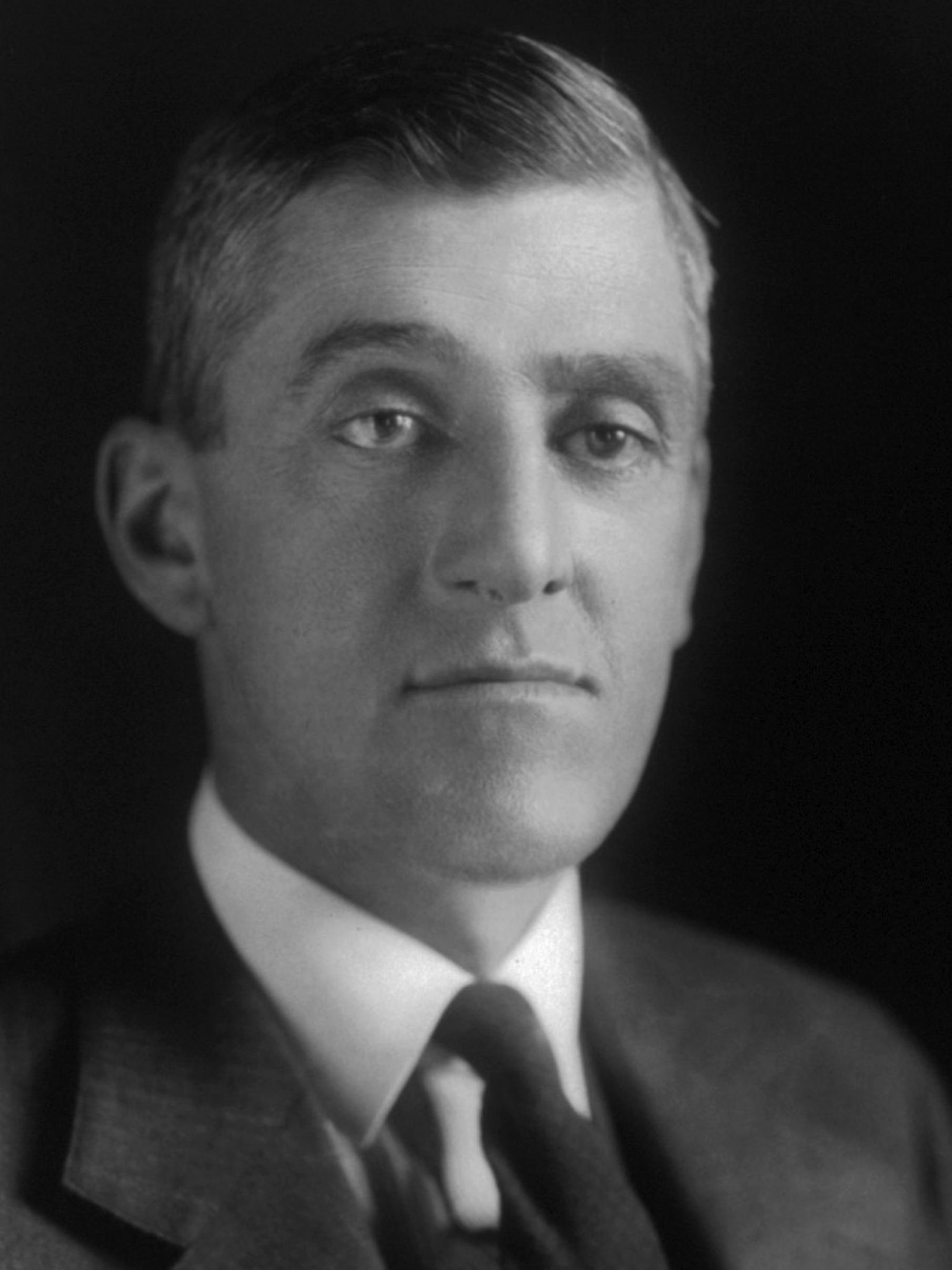

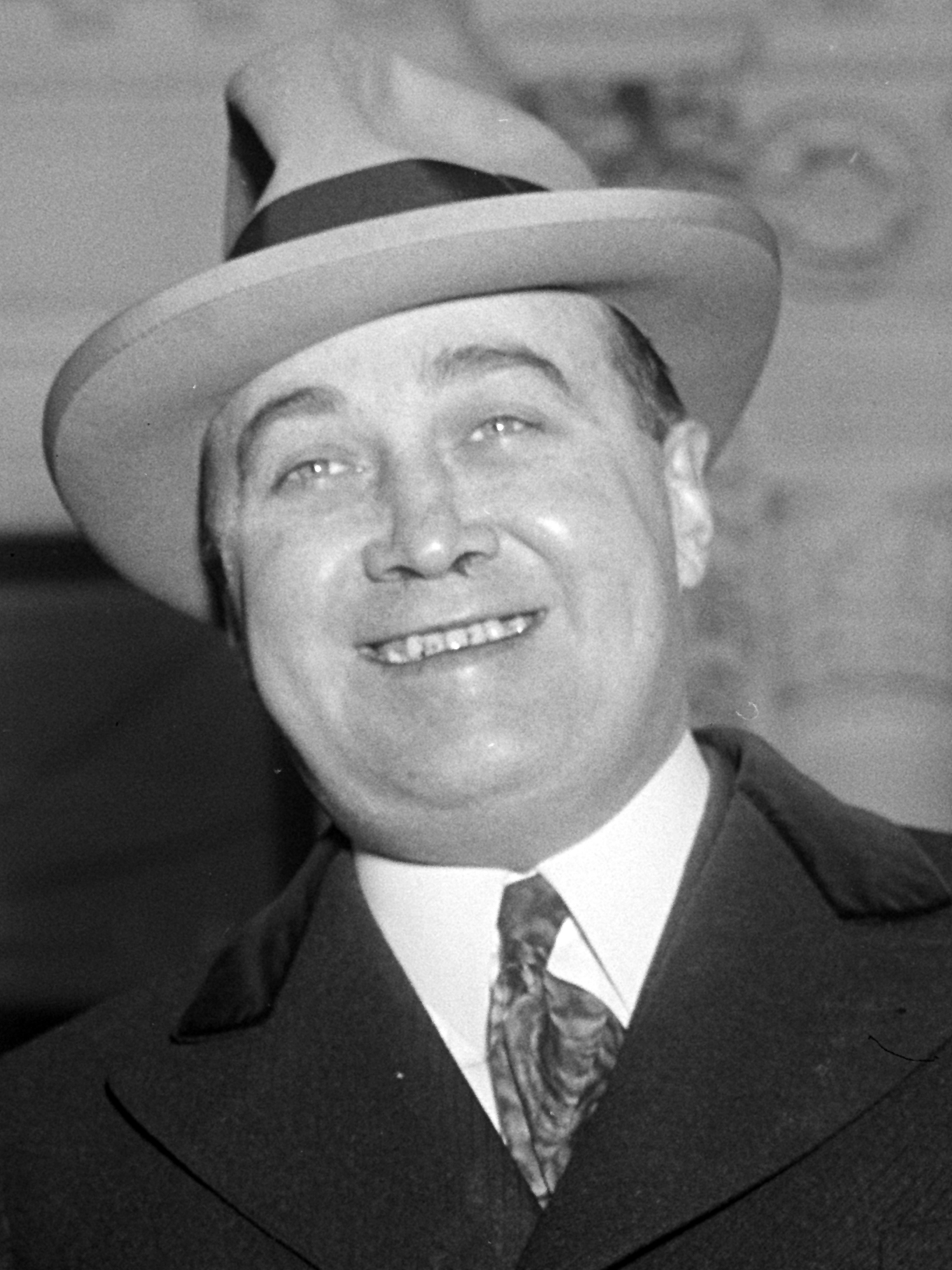
Nominee	Leverett Saltonstall	Paul A. Dever
Party	Republican	Democratic
Popular vote	999,223	993,635
Percentage	49.74%	49.46%
- Saltonstall: 40–50% 50–60% 60–70% 70–80% 80–90% >90% Dever: 40–50% 50–60% 60–70% 70–80%
Governor before election
Leverett Saltonstall
Republican
Elected Governor
Leverett Saltonstall
Republican

The 1940 Massachusetts gubernatorial election was held on November 5, 1940. Incumbent Governor Leverett Saltonstall sought a second term. He narrowly defeated Democrat Paul Dever, who would be elected governor in 1948.

== Republican primary ==
=== Governor ===
Incumbent Governor Leverett Saltonstall was unopposed for re-election.

==== Results ====
Republican gubernatorial primary, 1940
Party	Candidate	Votes	%	±%
Republican	Leverett Saltonstall (incumbent)	304,689	99.98%	
Write-in	All others	62	0.02%	

=== Lieutenant governor ===
Incumbent Lieutenant Governor Horace Cahill was unopposed for re-election.

==== Results ====
Republican lt. gubernatorial primary, 1940
Party	Candidate	Votes	%	±%
Republican	Horace T. Cahill	298,854	100.00%	
Write-in	All others	9	0.00%	

== Democratic primary ==
=== Governor ===
==== Candidates ====
===== Declared =====
- Paul Dever, Massachusetts attorney general
- Francis E. Kelly, former lieutenant governor

==== Results ====
Democratic gubernatorial primary, 1940
Party	Candidate	Votes	%	±%
Democratic	Paul A. Dever	239,273	66.22%	
Democratic	Francis E. Kelly	122,061	33.78%	
Write-in	All others	10	0.00%	

=== Lieutenant governor ===
==== Candidates ====
===== Declared =====
- John C. Carr, mayor of Medford
- Owen A. Gallagher, former state senator
- Francis P. Kelley
- Michael P. McCarron
- Charles E. O'Neil
- Raymond A. Willett

Democratic lt. gubernatorial primary, 1940
Party	Candidate	Votes	%	±%
Democratic	Owen A. Gallagher	122,884	36.08%	
Democratic	John C. Carr	120,806	35.47%	
Democratic	Francis P. Kelley	61,875	18.17%	
Democratic	Michael P. McCarron	14,751	4.33%	
Democratic	Charles E. O'Neil	10,945	3.21%	
Democratic	Raymond A. Willett	9,286	2.73%	
Write-in	All others	13	0.00%	

== Governor ==
Massachusetts gubernatorial election, 1940
Party	Candidate	Votes	%	±%
Republican	Leverett Saltonstall (incumbent)	999,223	49.74%	
Democratic	Paul A. Dever	993,635	49.46%	
Communist	Otis Archer Hood	5,547	0.27%	
Socialist	Jeffrey W. Campbell	4,623	0.23%	
Socialist Labor	Henning A. Blomen	3,463	0.17%	
Prohibition	E. Tallmadge Root	2,320	0.11%	
Write-in	All others	9	0.00%	
Republican hold		Swing		

== Lt. governor ==
Massachusetts Lt. gubernatorial election, 1940
Party	Candidate	Votes	%	±%
Republican	Horace T. Cahill	985,884	50.59%	
Democratic	Owen A. Gallagher	928,739	47.65%	
Prohibition	Guy S. Williams	11,339	0.58%	
Communist	Hugo DeGregory	9,827	0.50%	
Socialist	Walter S. Hutchins	8,212	0.42%	
Socialist Labor	George L. McGlynn	5,022	0.26%	
Write-in	All others	8	0.00%	
Republican hold		Swing		

== See also ==
- 1939 Massachusetts legislature

== Bibliography ==
- Frederic W. Cook, Secretary of the Commonwealth (1941). Election Statistics, 1940. Boston, MA.
