= Warren L. Bishop =

American lawyer and politician (1890–1939)

District Attorney of Middlesex County, Massachusetts
- In office 1931–1938
- Preceded by: Robert T. Bushnell
- Succeeded by: William G. Andrew

Personal details
- Born: 1890 Wayland, Massachusetts
- Died: December 17, 1939 (aged 49) Cochituate, Massachusetts
- Party: Democratic (1907-1919); Republican (1919-1938); Democratic (1938-1939)
- Education: Boston University School of Law
- Occupation: Attorney

Warren L. Bishop (1890–1939) was an American lawyer and politician who served as District Attorney of Middlesex County, Massachusetts from 1931 to 1939.

== Early life ==
Bishop was born in 1890 in Wayland, Massachusetts to George W. and Gertrude Langmaid Bishop. He attended public school in Wayland and the Boston University School of Law. He was admitted to the bar following his graduation in 1912.

== Politics ==
=== Municipal office ===
Bishop made his first political speech at the age of 17 and spent a number of years stumping for the Democratic Party. At the age of 21 he was elected town clerk of Wayland. He left office to serve in the coastal artillery World War I, but returned after his military service and remained in office until 1924. He concurrently served as Wayland's town counsel for 10 years. From 1926 to 1930 he was a member of the Wayland school committee and 1926 to 1939 he was town moderator.

In 1919, Bishop was the Democratic nominee for the Massachusetts Senate seat in the 5th Middlesex District. However, on October 30, 1919, he left the race and the Democratic party stating "I refuse to be in partnership with Bolshevism and anarchy, and for that reason I shall cast my vote...for the one great, true, patriotic manly man...Calvin Coolidge".

=== Assistant District Attorney ===
On December 22, 1922, Arthur Kenneth Reading, District Attorney-elect of Middlesex County, appointed Bishop as one of his assistants. He was retained by Reading's successor, Robert T. Bushnell. During his tenure as Bushnell’s first assistant, Bishop prosecuted over 6,000 cases. He obtained the first two convictions of Bushnell's administration - one for statutory rape and another for breaking and entering. In 1927, Bishop made the unusual move of arguing for the defense in a case he was prosecuting. The two defendants, who were Canadian tourists accused of attempting to break into a gas station, were immediately found not guilty. That April he handled the Harvard riot case, as Bushnell, a Harvard graduate, wanted someone with no connection to the school to handle the case. All 11 defendants entered Nolo contendere and were placed on probation.

=== District Attorney ===
In 1930, Bishop entered the race to succeed Bushnell as district attorney. He won the Republican nomination and defeated his Democratic opponent by over 35,000 votes. In 1931 he ordered the arrest of Edwin T. McKnight, president of the Medford Trust Company. McKnight and one of the bank's directors, Frank W. Lovering were convicted of four felonies and two misdemeanors and were fined $5,000 and $2,500, respectively. In 1933, McKnight was convicted of larceny and sentenced to two years in the Middlesex House of Correction. He was granted early release for good behavior but he refused in order to delay his move to Charlestown State Prison.

In 1933, Bishop began conducting a number of gambling raids. On August 26, 20 state troopers raided the Middlesex Motor Club in Lexington and seized illegal gambling equipment and liquor. The following day, Bishop personally led a raid of the Hamilton Club in Everett, which led to two arrests on liquor charges. On September 7, 300 slot machines were seized from the premises of the American Candy Company in Cambridge. In 1934, Bishop was reelected over Lowell, Massachusetts mayor James J. Bruin 176,583 votes to 145,549.

In 1936, Bishop nol prossed an assault and battery by means of dangerous weapons case against Cornelius V.S. Roosevelt and Peter de Florez.

On March 8, 1937, Bishop announced that he was forming his own detective bureau and requested that all state detectives in the county be removed. This action came after state Public Safety Commissioner Paul G. Kirk Sr. moved a state detective assigned to the DA’s office against Bishop's wishes.

=== Run for Governor ===
On February 7, 1935, Bishop announced his candidacy for Governor of Massachusetts in the 1936 election. He ran on a platform of "rigid adherence to Constitutional principles", cooperation with industrial enterprises, creation of government-funded old age pensions, job creation, removing barriers to industry, and a sound tax system. On April 17, 1936 he fired his lead assistant, Frank G. Volpe, accusing him of "disloyalty". According to Volpe, he was dismissed because he refused to "go on the stump for him as Governor" as Volpe's former boss, Robert T. Bushnell, was also a candidate in the race. Bishop ran well behind the Republican frontrunners John W. Haigis and Leverett Saltonstall and dropped out of the race before the party convention.

=== Defeat for reelection ===
In June 1938, Robert F. Bradford announced that he would challenge Bishop for district attorney. Shortly thereafter, a group of Republican leaders, former district attorneys, and lawyers including Robert Bushnell, Frank Volpe, Sinclair Weeks, Daniel Needham, and Benjamin Loring Young announced that they would support Bradford for District Attorney "as a public duty and necessity". Former state party chairman George G. Tarbell resigned from the Republican state committee to serve as Bradford's campaign treasurer. During his campaign Bradford criticized Bishop for trying a low number of cases (19 in 8 years), no-prossing almost 20% of the cases in his jurisdiction, and replacing the state police with his own force that included his son (who was still in school) and other untrained individuals. One of Bishop's assistant district attorneys, Julius H. Wolfson, resigned in order to support Bradford. Bradford defeated Bishop by a margin of 20,000 votes. It was the first time in the county's history that an incumbent district attorney lost his party's nomination. Following his defeat, Bishop supported the Democratic nominee, Joseph V. Carroll, over Bradford. Bishop unexpectedly resigned on November 23, 1938 and, at Bishop's recommendation, Governor Charles F. Hurley appointed Bishop's former top assistant, William G. Andrew, to finish the final months of his term.

== Death ==
On December 16, 1939, Bishop suffered a heart attack at his office. He died at his home in Cochituate, Massachusetts the following day.
