= Edward T. Martin =

American judge

36th Attorney General of the Commonwealth of Massachusetts
- In office January 2, 1967 – January 18, 1967
- Appointed by: John A. Volpe
- Preceded by: Edward W. Brooke
- Succeeded by: Elliot Richardson

Personal details
- Born: 1910 Newton, Massachusetts, U.S.
- Died: 1984 (aged 73–74) Bermuda
- Education: American Institute of Banking; Suffolk University Law School; Boston University Law School
- Profession: Lawyer

Edward T. Martin (1910–1984) was an American attorney and judge who served as Attorney General of Massachusetts for sixteen days in 1967.

== Early life ==
Martin was born in Newton, Massachusetts. He graduated from Newton High School in 1927, the American Institute of Banking in 1931, and Suffolk University Law School in 1936. Martin resided in Lexington, Massachusetts, where he was member of the town's School Committee. Prior to joining the Attorney General's office he was a member of the Federal Renegotiation Board.

== Attorney General's office ==
During the 1962 election, Martin served as attorney general candidate Edward Brooke's campaign coordinator in the suburbs west of Boston. When Brooke took office in January 1963 he named Martin Chief of the Financial Division. While in this position, Martin felt that he needed a better background in tax law, so he attended Boston University School of Law at nights and earned a master of laws in taxation. When the position of First Deputy Attorney General opened up in 1964, Brooke appointed Martin. As First Deputy, he was responsible for the day to day operations of the Attorney General's office. He also maintained a private law practice during this time.

== Attorney General ==
In the 1966 election, Brooke was elected to the United States Senate and Elliot Richardson was elected attorney general. Brooke resigned as attorney general on January 2, 1967, to take his Senate seat. He recommended that Martin be appointed to succeed him. As the legislature was not in session, the only person with the authority to appoint an Attorney General was Governor John A. Volpe, who appointed Martin. Martin served as attorney general until January 18, when Richardson's term began.

=== Belotti investigation ===
During his tenure as attorney general, Martin's office continued a controversial investigation into former Lieutenant Governor Francis X. Bellotti. Bellotti, the Democratic nominee for Attorney General in 1966, had been accused by Richardson during the campaign of receiving money from Nationwide Insurance while serving as lieutenant governor for work before the state Insurance Department. Bellotti claimed that the investigation was "patently political" and criticized Brooke, who had initiated the investigation before leaving office, for "white-wash[ing]" the brother of Republican governor John A. Volpe, but finding "cause to recommend further investigation against me, a Democrat". The investigation was not closed during Martin's time in office and Richardson appointed a special panel in an informal trusteeship to review the case. Bellotti was cleared by the panel.

== Judicial career ==
From 1967 to 1969, Martin served as Volpe's chief secretary. He was later appointed as a special justice of the West Roxbury District Court. He took his seat on January 17, 1969. On August 27, 1969, Acting Governor Francis W. Sargent nominated Martin to be a judge on the Middlesex Probate Court. His appointment was confirmed by the Massachusetts Governor's Council on September 10, 1969. He retired from the bench on April 25, 1980.

== Death ==
In 1984, Martin died unexpectedly while on vacation in Bermuda.
