= James J. Bruin =

American politician (1898-1949)

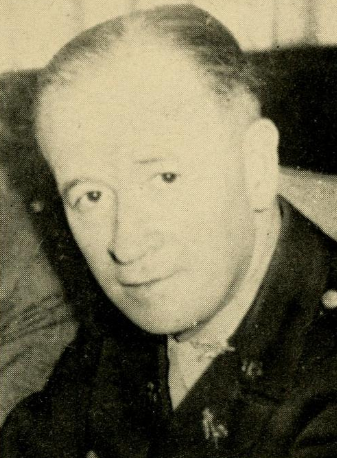

Member of the Massachusetts House of Representatives from the 15th Middlesex district
- In office January 5, 1949 – January 26, 1949
- Preceded by: Seat created
- Succeeded by: James O'Dea Jr.

Member of the Lowell City Council
- In office 1948–1950

Mayor of Lowell, Massachusetts
- In office 1934–1935
- Preceded by: Charles H. Slowey
- Succeeded by: Dewey G. Archambault

Member of the Lowell School Committee
- In office 1923–1925

Personal details
- Born: October 31, 1898 Lowell, Massachusetts, U.S.
- Died: January 26, 1949 (aged 50) Lowell, Massachusetts, U.S.
- Resting place: St. Patrick's Cemetery
- Party: Democratic
- Spouse: Mary Lou Paone (m. 1948)
- Education: Northeastern Law School (LL.B)
- Occupation: Lawyer

Military service
- Allegiance: United States
- Branch/service: Judge Advocate General's Corps
- Rank: Captain

James J. Bruin (October 31, 1898 – January 26, 1949) was an American politician from Lowell, Massachusetts.

== Early life ==
Bruin was born on October 31, 1898, in Lowell. In 1922 he graduated from the Northeastern University School of Law.

== Political career ==
Bruin served on the Lowell school committee from 1923 to 1925. In 1932 he was the Democratic nominee for the United States House of Representatives seat in Massachusetts's 5th congressional district, but lost to incumbent Edith Nourse Rogers. From 1934 to 1935 he was the mayor of Lowell. In 1934 he was the Democratic nominee for Middlesex County District Attorney, but lost to incumbent Warren L. Bishop. In 1948, Bruin returned to elected office as a member of the Lowell city council. Later that year he was elected to the Massachusetts House of Representatives. However, Bruin died on January 26, 1949, soon after taking office.

== See also ==
- 1949–1950 Massachusetts legislature
