= George E. Thompson =

American jurist (1904-1973)

District Attorney of Middlesex County, Massachusetts
- In office 1945–1956
- Preceded by: Robert F. Bradford
- Succeeded by: Ephraim Martin

Personal details
- Born: March 4, 1904 Lawrence, Massachusetts, U.S.
- Died: September 8, 1973 (aged 69) Boston, Massachusetts, U.S.
- Resting place: Wyoming Cemetery; Melrose, Massachusetts, U.S.
- Party: Republican
- Education: Boston University School of Law
- Occupation: Attorney

George Edwin Thompson (March 4, 1904 – September 3, 1973) was an American jurist who served as an associate justice of the Massachusetts Superior Court and District Attorney of Middlesex County, Massachusetts.

== Early life ==
Thompson was born in Lawrence, Massachusetts and graduated from Lawrence High School in 1921. He graduated from the Boston University School of Law in 1924 and earned a master's degree from the school in 1925. He became a partner in the firm of Ely, Bradford, Thompson and Brown.

== District attorney ==
In 1940, Thompson became an assistant district attorney of Middlesex County. In 1944, Thompson managed DA Robert F. Bradford's successful campaign for Lieutenant Governor of Massachusetts and was appointed to succeed Bradford as district attorney. He was elected to full four-year terms in 1946, 1950, and 1954. In 1951, he indicted Massachusetts Institute of Technology Dirk Jan Struik professor on charges of conspiracy to overthrow the governments of the United States and Massachusetts. The indictment was quashed in 1956 by judge Paul G. Kirk after the Massachusetts Supreme Court ruled in a different case that the federal Smith Act superseded Massachusetts' sedition laws.

== Massachusetts Superior Court ==
In 1956, Thompson was appointed to the Massachusetts Superior Court by Governor Christian Herter. He remained on the bench until his death on September 3, 1973. He was 69 years old.
