= Cornelius T. Finnegan Jr. =

American lawyer and politician (1918-2006)

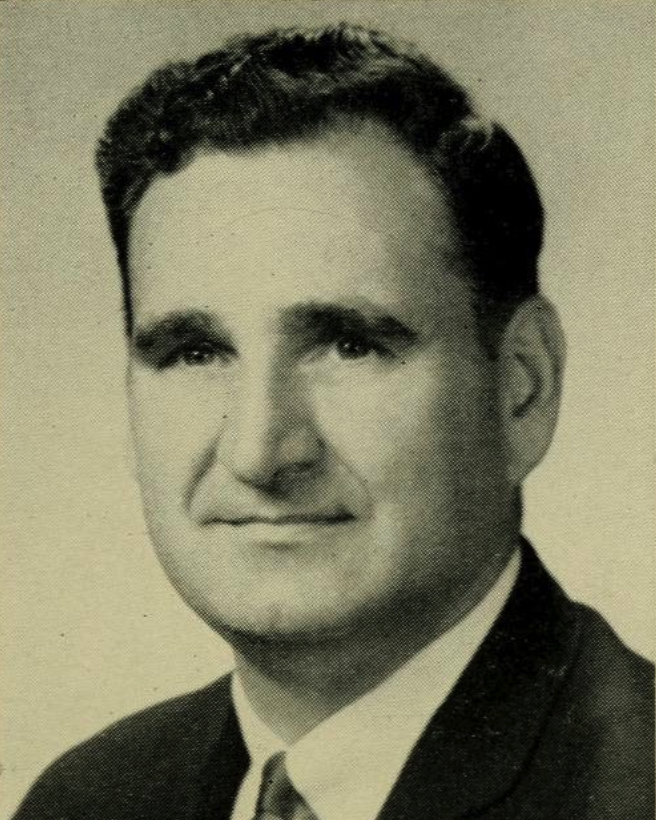

Member of the Massachusetts House of Representatives from the 15th Middlesex district
- In office January 1957 – January 6, 1965
- Preceded by: James O'Dea Jr.
- Succeeded by: John J. Desmond

Personal details
- Born: December 13, 1918 Lowell, Massachusetts
- Died: September 29, 2006 (aged 87) Chelmsford, Massachusetts
- Party: Democratic
- Spouse: Anne O'Sullivan
- Education: Suffolk University

Military service
- Allegiance: United States
- Branch/service: United States Marine Corps
- Rank: Sergeant
- Battles/wars: World War II

Cornelius Thomas Finnegan Jr. (December 13, 1918 – September 29, 2006) was an American lawyer and politician who served in the Massachusetts House of Representatives.
