= 1972 United States Senate election in Massachusetts =

- November 7, 1972
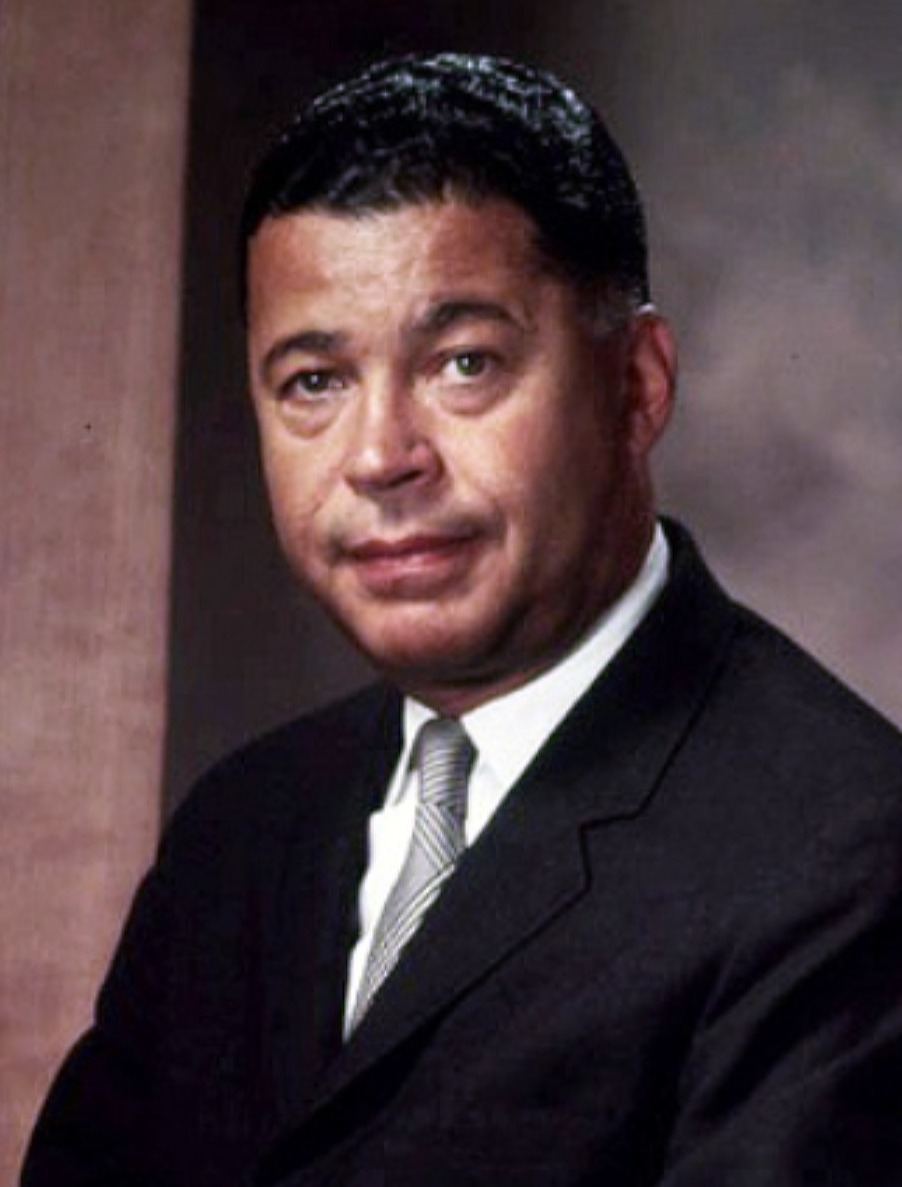

Nominee	Edward Brooke	John J. Droney
Party	Republican	Democratic
Popular vote	1,505,932	823,278
Percentage	63.53%	34.73%
- Brooke: 40–50% 50–60% 60–70% 70–80% 80–90% >90% Droney: 40–50% 50–60%
U.S. senator before election
Edward Brooke
Republican
Elected U.S. Senator
Edward Brooke
Republican

The United States Senate election of 1972 in Massachusetts was held on November 7, 1972. Republican incumbent Edward Brooke defeated Democratic prosecutor John J. Droney in a landslide.

This was also the last time until 2010 that a Republican would win any United States Senate election in Massachusetts. As of 2026, this remains the last time that any Republican has been elected to Massachusetts’s Class II Senate seat, and the last time any Republican has been elected to either Senate seat for a full term. This election was the first time that any African American senator was re-elected to a second term in the Senate.

== Republican primary ==
=== Candidates ===
- Edward Brooke, incumbent U.S. senator since 1967

Senator Edward Brooke was unopposed for re-nomination. At the state convention on June 24, he was renominated by acclamation.

== Democratic primary ==
=== Candidates ===
- John J. Droney, Middlesex County district attorney
- John P. Lynch, Hampden County register of deeds
- Gerald O'Leary, member of the Boston City Council

==== Eliminated at the convention ====
- George Burke, Norfolk County district attorney (endorsed Droney)

==== Declined ====
- John Kenneth Galbraith, economist and former U.S. ambassador to India

=== Campaign ===
John Droney won the party endorsement at the June 11 convention on the sixth ballot. The party platform endorsed legalized marijuana and an end to the Vietnam War. Droney himself did not oppose the war, stating that there was no right or wrong stand on Vietnam. He received the support of state Attorney General Robert H. Quinn, Boston Mayor Kevin White, and state legislative leadership. After losing at the convention, Norfolk County District Attorney George Burke dropped out of the race and backed Droney. However, Boston City Councilman Gerald O'Leary, who was considered the most liberal candidate, and Hampden County Register of Deeds John Pierce Lynch chose to stay in the race and challenge Droney in the Democratic primary.

=== Results ===
Democratic primary results by municipality

1972 Democratic U.S. Senate primary
Party	Candidate	Votes	%
Democratic	John J. Droney	215,523	45.05%
Democratic	Gerald O'Leary	169,876	35.51%
Democratic	John P. Lynch	92,979	19.43%
Total votes		478,378	100.00%

== General election ==
=== Candidates ===
- Edward Brooke, incumbent U.S. senator since 1967 (Republican)
- John J. Droney, Middlesex County district attorney (Democratic)
- Donald Gurewitz, anti-war activist (Socialist Workers)

=== Campaign ===
Brooke centered his campaign on experience and on his sponsorship of an amendment to end American involvement in the Vietnam War. Droney ran on a law and order platform, supporting Richard Nixon's conservative nominees to the United States Supreme Court and questioning the value of the Fifth Amendment. He also supported some of the president's foreign policy initiatives and did not come out against the Vietnam War. He chose to focus his attacks on Brooke's record as attorney general from 1963 to 1966 rather than Brooke's record in the senate. Droney criticized Brooke for files that had allegedly disappeared during his administration (an investigative panel could not determine if the files went missing under Brooke's watch or that of his successor Elliot Richardson) and for his handling of the Boston Strangler case.

Brooke held a large lead throughout the campaign. He led Droney 72 percent to 18 percent in an October poll conducted by Becker Research, and 66 percent to 23 percent in a poll conducted by the same firm shortly before election day.

=== Results ===
1972 U.S. Senate election in Massachusetts
Party	Candidate	Votes	%	±%
Republican	Edward Brooke (incumbent)	1,505,932	63.53%	▲2.85
Democratic	John J. Droney	823,278	34.73%	▼4.01
Socialist Workers	Donald Gurewitz	41,369	1.75%	▲1.41
Total votes		2,370,579	100.00%	

== See also ==
- 1972 United States Senate elections

== External links and references ==
- Race details at ourcampaigns.com
