= John J. Droney =

American lawyer and politician (1911–1989)

Massachusetts District Attorney for the Northern District
- In office 1961–1983
- Preceded by: James O'Dea Jr.
- Succeeded by: Scott Harshbarger
- Acting; October 22, 1959 – 1961

Personal details
- Born: 1911
- Died: November 3, 1989 (aged 77–78) Medford, Massachusetts, U.S.
- Cause of death: Amyotrophic lateral sclerosis
- Resting place: Cambridge Cemetery
- Party: Democratic
- Spouse: Margaret M. McDougall
- Children: 1
- Education: Suffolk University (JD)

Military service
- Allegiance: United States
- Branch/service: United States Navy
- Battles/wars: World War II; Pacific War

John Joseph Droney (1911–1989) was an American politician who served as district attorney of Middlesex County, Massachusetts from 1959 to 1983.

== Early life ==
Droney was raised in Cambridge, Massachusetts. He played football and hockey at Cambridge High School. His father, a linesman for the Metropolitan Transit Authority, was killed in 1929 and Droney worked two jobs to support his mother and sisters. In 1937, he was an unsuccessful candidate for the Cambridge city council.

Droney served in the United States Navy during World War II. He rose to the rank of signalman and participated in the Battle of Iwo Jima and the Battle of Okinawa.

== Legal career ==
Droney graduated from Suffolk University Law School in 1941 and passed the bar in 1942. After the War, Droney opened a law office in Cambridge's Central Square. In 1957 he joined the staff of Middlesex County district attorney James O'Dea Jr. In April 1958 he was named first assistant.

== District attorney ==
O'Dea resigned as Middlesex District Attorney in 1959 and moved out of state. At the behest of United States Senator John F. Kennedy, Governor Foster Furcolo appointed Droney as O'Dea's interim replacement. He was confirmed by the Massachusetts Governor's Council on October 22, 1959, and sworn in the same day. After taking office, Droney instituted gaming raids that resulted in 50 arrests. He was elected to a complete O'Dea's term in 1960, defeating John Zamparelli in the Democratic primary and James F. Mahan in the general election. He ran for a full term in 1962. He beat John F. Cremens and Albert R. Menzoff in the Democratic primary and William G. Andrew in the general election.

In 1977, Droney named former Vietnam Veterans Against the War spokesman and unsuccessful congressional candidate John Kerry as his first assistant. After amyotrophic lateral sclerosis resulted in Droney needing to use a wheelchair and made it difficult for him to speak, Kerry served as his chief spokesman and surrogate. Droney's health was the main issue during the 1978 election, which saw him challenged by assistant attorney general Scott Harshbarger and former Metropolitan District Commissioner Guy Carbone in what was seen as his toughest re-election fight. In that year's Democratic primary, Droney beat Harshbarger 43% to 40%, with third-place candidate Carbone receiving the remaining 17% of the vote. Kerry left the DA's office in 1979 to pursue other opportunities.

=== Notable cases ===
In 1961, Droney charged Middlesex County sheriff Howard W. Fitzpatrick and three guards with negligence after jail master David Robinson was killed in a jail break. The indictment was thrown out by judge Robert Sullivan.

Along with the Massachusetts State Police and the Lincoln Police Department, Droney's office investigated the 1961 disappearance of Joan Risch. He placed assistant district attorney Richard Kelley in charge of the case and when four state police detectives were assigned to his office in December 1962, one was tasked with working on the Risch case full time. On February 19, 1963, Droney announced that Risch had taken out multiple books on vanishing and starting a new life from the Lincoln library. The case remains unsolved.

In 1963, Droney oversaw the 18-hour interrogation of Roy Smith, a black handyman arrested for the strangling of Bessie Goldberg. Smith maintained his innocence but was charged with murder, rape, and robbery. On November 23, 1963, Smith was found guilty of murder and robbery, but not of rape. Subsequent investigation by former Metropolitan District Commission detective Stephen C. Delaney found that Boston Strangler Albert DeSalvo had been working 1.2 miles from the Goldberg home on the day of the murder. He also found two witnesses who admitted to making false statements during the trial because the prosecution threatened to end their Aid to Families with Dependent Children and have their children taken away. George Keefe, a member of the state parole board, stated that although Smith had failed a 1970 lie detector test, "there circumstantial evidence in this case was one of the weakest of any case I have encountered in 26 years in parole work". On August 18, 1973, the Massachusetts Governor's Council granted Smith, who was diagnosed with terminal lung cancer, a commutation. He died two days later of a heart attack.

In 1968, Droney reopened the investigation into the murder of Beverly Samans. Droney based his decision off information from George W. Harrison, an inmate who claimed to overhear another convict coaching Albert DeSalvo about details of the Boston Strangler murders. Although DeSalvo confessed to the 13 Boston Strangler murders, Droney believed that someone else was responsible for Samans' murder due to discrepancies in DeSalvo's statement.

In 1977, Droney's office secured the convictions of Robert E. Smith and Robert S. Wilson for the New Year's Eve 1975 murders of Dr. Hugh Mahoney, his wife Ruth, and their 14-year-old son John during an attempted robbery.

During the 1978 United States Senate election, Droney declined to prosecute his former political opponent Senator Edward Brooke for perjury stemming from admitted misstatements during his divorce proceedings, citing a lack of jurisdiction as the proceedings had taken place in Boston.

On January 6, 1982, Droney's office coordinated a 200-trooper raid of the Massachusetts Correctional Institution – Framingham in order to break up an alleged drug trafficking and gambling operation in the prison. The DA's office alleged that Con'Puter Systems Programming, a data processing business run by a group of prisoners was operating as a front for drug trafficking and gambling. On February 19, 1982 Susan Edith Saxe and four inmates were indicted for income tax violations related to the alleged criminal enterprise. On January 29, 1983, the charges against Saxe and the others were dropped because the prosecution was unable to produce requested records.

== Runs for statewide office ==
On November 14, 1963, Droney announced that he would challenge incumbent Governor Endicott Peabody in the following year's gubernatorial election. He stated that he was "in complete disagreement with the policies and actions of Peabody on almost every major issue", including the governor's opposition to the death penalty and a proposed increase on the state gasoline tax. He also accused the Governor of doing "everything possible to demoralize the law enforcement of the Commonwealth". Droney received 4% of the vote in a four-candidate Democratic primary that was won by Francis X. Bellotti.

On June 6, 1972, Droney announced that he was entering that year's United States Senate election. He ran on a law and order platform, attacking incumbent senator Edward Brooke for opposing Richard Nixon's conservative nominees to the United States Supreme Court. Droney was the candidate of the party regulars and had the support of state attorney general Robert H. Quinn, Boston Mayor Kevin White and legislative leadership. He won the Democratic state convention's endorsement after nine hours and six ballots. Norfolk County district attorney George Burke dropped out of the race and backed Droney, but Boston City Councilor Gerald O'Leary and Hampden County Register of Deeds John Pierce Lynch chose to stay in the race and face Droney in the Democratic primary. Droney won the primary with 45% of the vote to O'Leary's 36% and Lynch's 19%. Droney lost the general election to Brooke 63% to 35%.

== Defeat ==
In August 1981, The Boston Globe reported that Droney was retiring and would not run for reelection in 1982. Soon thereafter, Droney issued a statement saying that he would run in 1982 if his health permitted. On March 3, 1982, Droney announced that he would run for reelection. He faced three 3 challengers – 1978 opponent Scott Harshbarger, Middlesex County register of probate Paul J. Cavanaugh, and former assistant DA Edward Gargiulo – for the Democratic nomination. Harshbarger won the primary with 48% of the vote. Droney finished in last place with 17%.

== Later life ==
Droney spent his later years in Medford, Massachusetts. He died on November 3, 1989, after a 16-year battle with ALS. He was 78 years old. He was survived by his wife and daughter.

Legal offices
Preceded by James O'Dea Jr.	District Attorney of Middlesex County; 1959–1983	Succeeded by Scott Harshbarger
Party political offices
Preceded by Endicott Peabody	Democratic nominee for U.S. Senator from Massachusetts (Class 2); 1972	Succeeded by Paul Tsongas
