= Edward Brooke =

American politician (1919–2015)

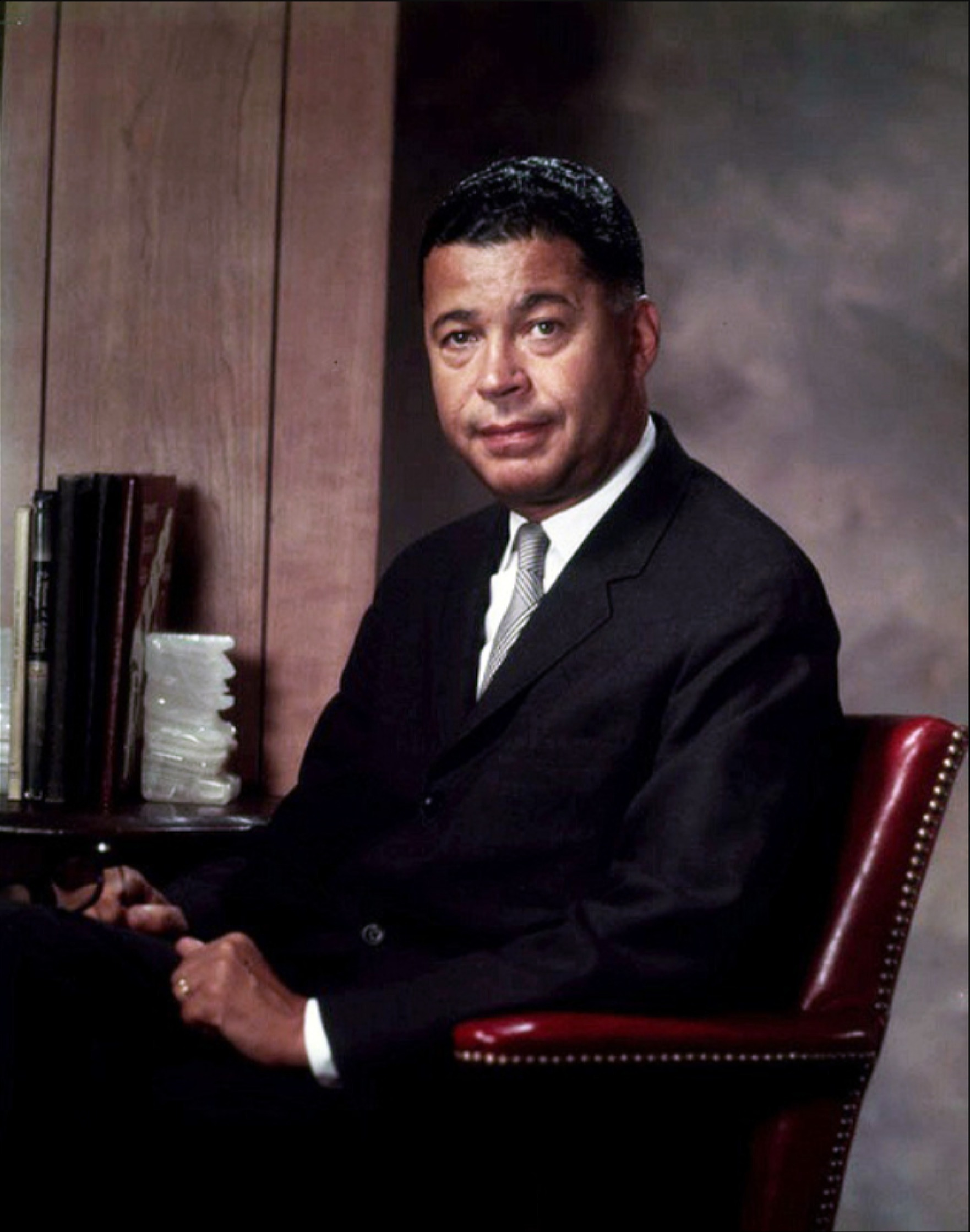
- Official portrait, c. 1967

United States Senator from Massachusetts
- In office January 3, 1967 – January 3, 1979
- Preceded by: Leverett Saltonstall
- Succeeded by: Paul Tsongas

35th Attorney General of Massachusetts
- In office January 3, 1963 – January 3, 1967
- Governor: Endicott Peabody; John Volpe
- Preceded by: Edward McCormack
- Succeeded by: Edward T. Martin

Personal details
- Born: Edward William Brooke III; October 26, 1919 Washington, D.C., U.S.
- Died: January 3, 2015 (aged 95) Coral Gables, Florida, U.S.
- Resting place: Arlington National Cemetery
- Party: Republican
- Spouses: Remigia Ferrari-Scacco (m. 1947; div. 1979); Anne Fleming (m. 1979)
- Children: 3
- Education: Howard University (BS); Boston University (LLB, LLM)
- Awards: Presidential Medal of Freedom (2004); Congressional Gold Medal (2008)

Military service
- Branch/service: United States Army
- Years of service: 1941–1946
- Rank: Captain
- Unit: 366th Infantry Regiment
- Battles/wars: World War II; Italian campaign

Edward William Brooke III (October 26, 1919 – January 3, 2015) was an American lawyer and Republican Party politician who represented Massachusetts in the United States Senate from 1967 to 1979. He was the first African American elected to the United States Senate by popular vote. (Note: The first African-American senator, Hiram Rhodes Revels, was elected by the Mississippi state legislature to an unexpired term in 1870. Blanche Bruce was the first African American elected to a full Senate term, elected by the Mississippi state legislature in 1874. Prior to the 17th Amendment in 1913, U.S. senators were elected by state legislatures.) Prior to serving in the Senate, he served as the attorney general of the Commonwealth of Massachusetts from 1963 until 1967. He was the first African-American since Reconstruction in 1874 to be elected to the United States Senate, and the first African-American since 1881 to hold a United States Senate seat. Brooke was also the first African-American U.S. senator to ever be re-elected. He was the longest-serving African-American U.S. senator at twelve years, until he was surpassed by Tim Scott in 2025.

Born to a middle-class black family, Brooke was raised in Washington, D.C. After attending Howard University, he graduated from Boston University School of Law in 1948 after serving in the U.S. Army during World War II. Beginning in 1950, he became involved in politics, when he ran for a seat in the Massachusetts House of Representatives. After serving as chairman of the Boston Finance Commission, Brooke was elected attorney general in 1962, becoming the first African-American to be elected attorney general of any state.

He served as attorney general for four years, before running for Senate in 1966. In the election, he defeated Democratic former Governor Endicott Peabody in a landslide, and was seated on January 3, 1967. In the Senate, Brooke aligned with the liberal faction in the Republican party. He co-wrote the Civil Rights Act of 1968, which prohibited housing discrimination. He was re-elected to a second term in 1972, after defeating attorney John Droney. Brooke became a prominent critic of Republican President Richard Nixon, and was the first Senate Republican to call for Nixon's resignation in light of the Watergate scandal. In 1978, he ran for a third term, but was defeated by Democrat Paul Tsongas. After leaving the Senate, Brooke practiced law in Washington, D.C., and was affiliated with various businesses and nonprofit organizations. Brooke died in 2015, at his home in Coral Gables, Florida, at the age of 95, and was the last living former U.S. senator born in the 1910s.

== Early life and education ==
Edward William Brooke III was born on October 26, 1919, in Washington, D.C., to a middle-class black family. His father Edward William Brooke Jr. was a lawyer and graduate of Howard University who worked with the Veterans' Administration, and his mother was Helen (née Seldon) Brooke. He was the second of three children. Brooke was raised in a racially segregated environment that was "insulated from the harsh realities of the Deep South", with Brooke rarely interacting with the white community.

He attended Dunbar High School—then one of the most prestigious academic high schools for African Americans—and graduated in 1936. After graduating, he enrolled in Howard University, where he first considered studying in medicine, before ending up studying social studies and political science. Brooke graduated from university in 1941, with a bachelor of science degree, After serving in the U.S. Army during World War II, Brooke graduated from the Boston University School of Law in 1948. "I never studied much at Howard," he later reflected, "but at Boston University, I didn't do much else but study."

== Military service ==
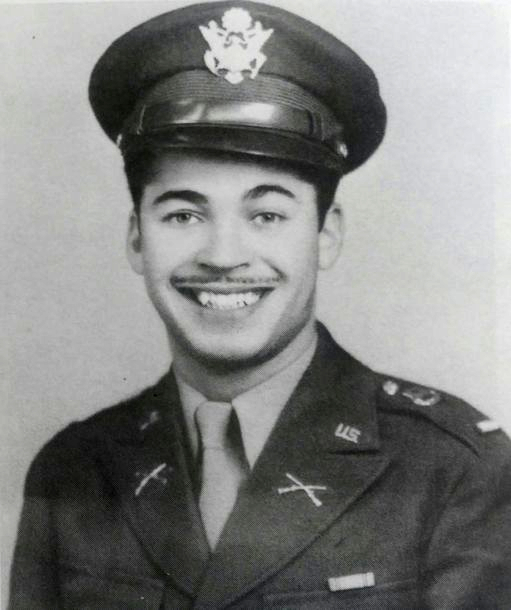
Brooke in his U.S. Army uniform c. 1941–1946

Brooke enlisted in the United States Army in 1941 following the Japanese attack on Pearl Harbor. He was commissioned as a second lieutenant. He saw combat in Italy as a member of the segregated 366th Infantry Regiment. Brooke spent 195 days with his unit in Italy. There, his fluent Italian and his light skin enabled him to cross enemy lines to communicate with Italian partisans. By the end of the war, Brooke had attained the rank of captain, a Bronze Star Medal, and a Distinguished Service Award.

Brooke's time in the Army exposed him to the inequality and racism which existed in the army system. This, combined with the signing of Executive Order 9066, led him to rethink his support of Democratic President Franklin D. Roosevelt. His time in the Army also changed his perception of race, with him meeting his future wife Remigia Ferrari-Scacco in Italy. He reasoned that "race had not mattered during our courtship in Italy, and therefore it should not have mattered in the United States".

== Early career ==
After graduating from Boston University, Brooke worked as a lawyer. He declined offers to join established law firms, instead opening his own law practice in the Roxbury neighborhood of Boston.

Brooke began his foray in politics in 1950, when, at the urging of friends from his former Army unit, he ran for a seat in the Massachusetts House of Representatives. Brooke did not affiliate with either of major political party, choosing instead to run in both the Democratic and Republican primaries. He won the Republican nomination but lost the general election in a landslide to his Democratic opponent. Two years later, he ran again for the same seat but again lost to the same Democratic opponent.

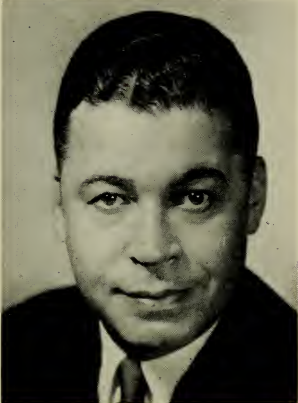
Brooke c. 1962

In 1960, Brooke ran for Massachusetts secretary of the commonwealth. He won the Republican nomination, becoming the first black person to be nominated for statewide office in Massachusetts. However, he lost the election to future mayor of Boston Kevin White, whose campaign issued a bumper sticker reading, "Vote White," which some took as a reference to Brooke's race. Despite losing the secretary's race to White, the closeness of the results led Republican leaders to take notice of Brooke's potential. Governor John Volpe sought to reward Brooke for his efforts, and offered him a number of jobs, most of them judicial in nature. Seeking a position with a higher political profile, Brooke eventually accepted a position on the Boston Finance Commission, where he investigated financial irregularities and uncovered evidence of corruption in city affairs. He was described in the press as having "the tenacity of a terrier", and it was reported that he "restore[d] to vigorous life an agency which many had thought moribund." He parlayed his achievements into a successful election as attorney general of Massachusetts in 1962, becoming the first African-American to be elected attorney general of any state.

As attorney general, Brooke gained a reputation as a vigorous prosecutor of organized crime and corruption, securing convictions against a number of members of the administration of governor Foster Furcolo; an indictment against Furcolo was dismissed due to lack of evidence. He also coordinated with local police departments on the Boston Strangler case, although the press mocked him for permitting an alleged psychic to participate in the investigation. In 1964, following the nomination of Barry Goldwater as the Republican party's nominee for president, Brooke found Goldwater's nomination offensive. He publicly broke with the party, and implored Republicans "not to invest in the 'pseudo-conservatism' of zealots". His public repudiation of Goldwater actually helped Brooke win re-election in 1964, as he won by a plurality of nearly 800,000. Encouraged by an outpour of positive support, Brooke continued to offer blunt criticisms of the Republicans, though he began softening his rhetoric by proposing strategies to rebuild the Republican Party. This included an off-year national convention to "hammer out an agreement for the future of the party" and "draft a responsible platform to address bread-and-butter issues". By 1965, Brooke had emerged as the main Republican spokesman for racial equality, despite "never rallying his race to challenge segregation barriers with the inspirational fervor of a Martin Luther King."

== U.S. Senate ==
=== First term (1967–1973) ===
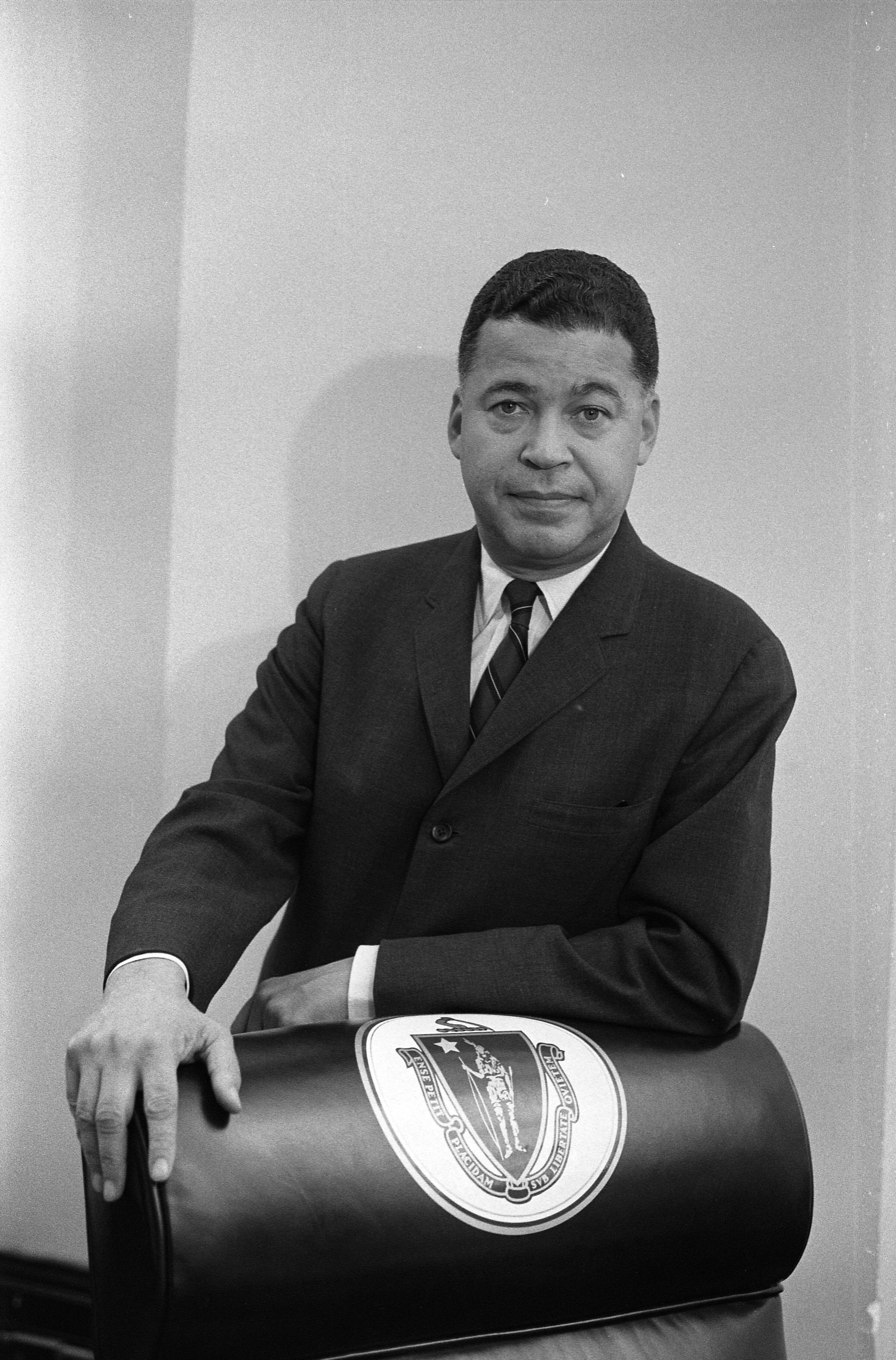
Brooke in 1967 behind a chair emblazoned with the Seal of Massachusetts

In the 1966 Massachusetts Senate election, Brooke defeated former Governor Endicott Peabody with 1,213,473 votes to Peabody's 744,761, and served as a United States senator for two terms, from January 3, 1967, to January 3, 1979. The black vote had, Time wrote, "no measurable bearing" on the election as less than 3% of the state's population was black, and Peabody also supported civil rights for blacks. Brooke said, "I do not intend to be a national leader of the Negro people", and the magazine said that he "condemned both Stokely Carmichael and Georgia's Lester Maddox" as extremists; his historic election nonetheless gave Brooke "a 50-state constituency", the magazine wrote, "a power base that no other Senator can claim".

Brooke said, "In all my years in the Senate, I never encountered an overt act of hostility". He recalled visiting the swimming pool at the Russell Senate Office Building, where segregationists John C. Stennis, John L. McClellan, and Strom Thurmond invited the new senator to join them in the water. "There was no hesitation or ill will that I could see. Yet these were men who consistently voted against legislation that would have provided equal opportunity to others of my race ... it was increasingly evident that some members of the Senate played on bigotry purely for political gain".

==== Tenure ====
A member of the moderate-to-liberal Northeastern wing of the Republican Party, Brooke organized the Senate's "Wednesday Club" of progressive Republicans who met for Wednesday lunches and strategy discussions. Brooke, who supported Michigan Governor George W. Romney and New York Governor Nelson Rockefeller's bids for the 1968 GOP presidential nomination against Richard Nixon's, often differed with President Nixon on matters of social policy and civil rights. In 1967, Brooke was awarded the Spingarn Medal from the NAACP.

In 1967, Brooke went to Vietnam on a three-week trip as a fact-finding mission. During his first formal speech in the Senate following the trip, he reversed his previous position on the Vietnam War that increased negotiations with the North Vietnamese rather than an escalation of the fighting were needed. He began to favor President Johnson's "patient" approach to Vietnam as he had been convinced that "the enemy is not disposed to participate in any meaningful negotiations".

By his second year in the Senate, Brooke had taken his place as a leading advocate against discrimination in housing and on behalf of affordable housing. With Walter Mondale, a Minnesota Democrat and fellow member of the Senate Banking Committee, he co-authored the 1968 Fair Housing Act, which prohibits discrimination in housing. The Act also created HUD's Office of Fair Housing and Equal Opportunity as the primary enforcer of the law. President Johnson signed the Fair Housing Act into law on April 11, one week after the assassination of Martin Luther King Jr. Dissatisfied with the weakened enforcement provisions that emerged from the legislative process, Brooke repeatedly proposed stronger provisions during his Senate career. In 1969, Congress enacted the "Brooke Amendment" to the federal publicly assisted housing program which limited the tenants' out-of-pocket rent expenditure to 25 percent of their income. Additionally, Brooke voted in favor of the confirmation of Thurgood Marshall to the U.S. Supreme Court.

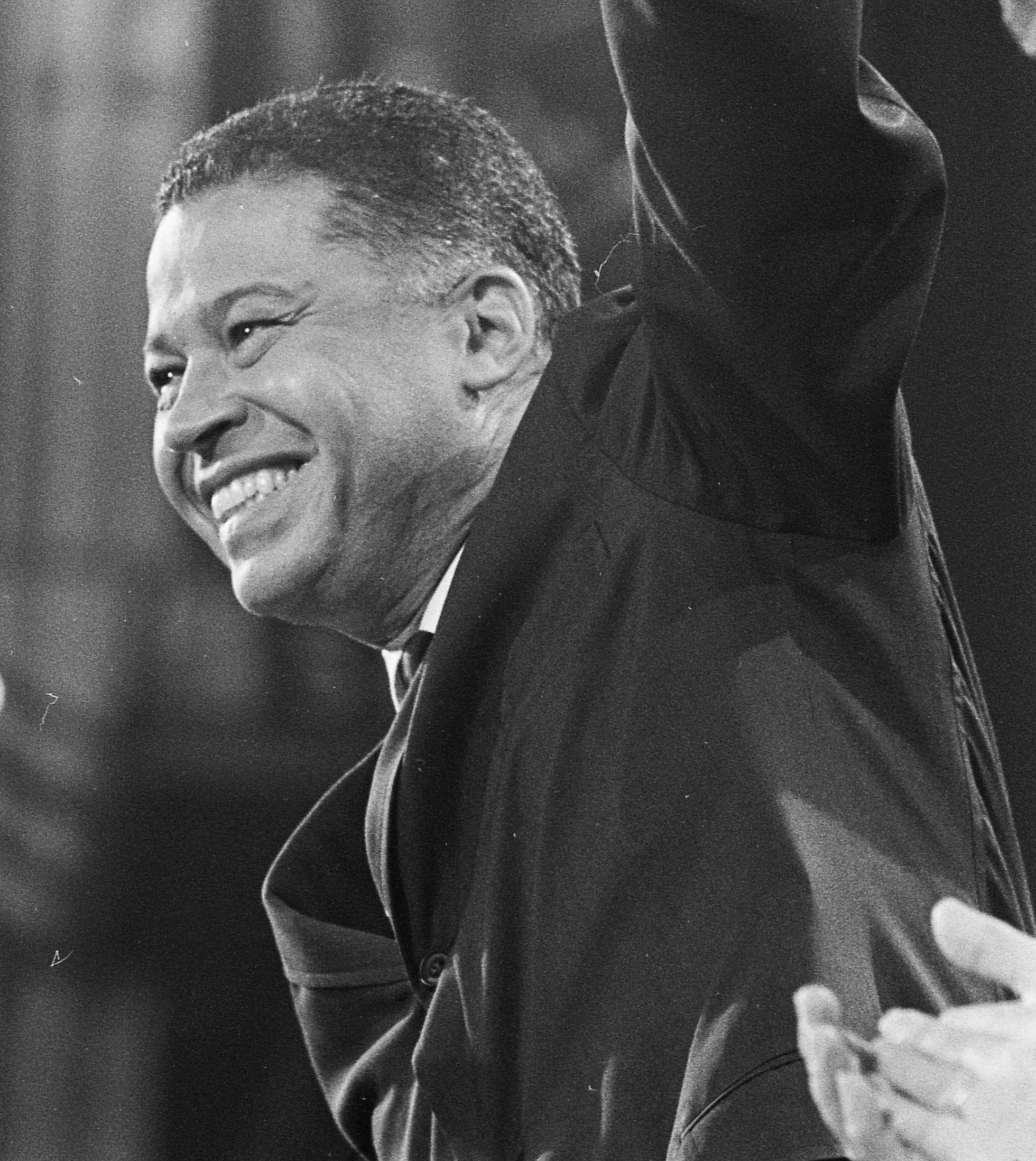
Brooke at the 1968 Republican National Convention

During the Nixon presidency, Brooke opposed repeated administration attempts to close down the Job Corps and the Office of Economic Opportunity and to weaken the Equal Employment Opportunity Commission—all foundational elements of President Lyndon B. Johnson's Great Society.

In 1969, Brooke spoke at Wellesley College's commencement against "coercive protest" and was understood by some students as calling protesters "elite ne'er-do-wells" Then student government president Hillary Rodham departed from her planned speech to rebut Brooke's words, affirming the "indispensable task of criticizing and constructive protest," for which she was featured in Life magazine.

On June 9, 1969, Brooke voted in favor of President Nixon's nomination of Warren E. Burger as chief justice of the United States following the retirement of Earl Warren. Brooke was a leader of the bipartisan coalition that defeated the Senate confirmation of Clement Haynsworth, Nixon's nominee to the Supreme Court on November 21, 1969. A few months later, he again organized sufficient Republican support to defeat Nixon's third Supreme Court nominee Harrold Carswell on April 8, 1970. The following month, Nixon nominee Harry Blackmun (who later wrote the Roe v. Wade opinion) was confirmed on May 12, 1970, with Brooke voting in favor. On December 6, 1971, Brooke voted in favor of Nixon's nomination of Lewis F. Powell Jr., while on December 10, Brooke voted against Nixon's nomination of William Rehnquist as associate justice.

=== Second term (1973–1979) ===
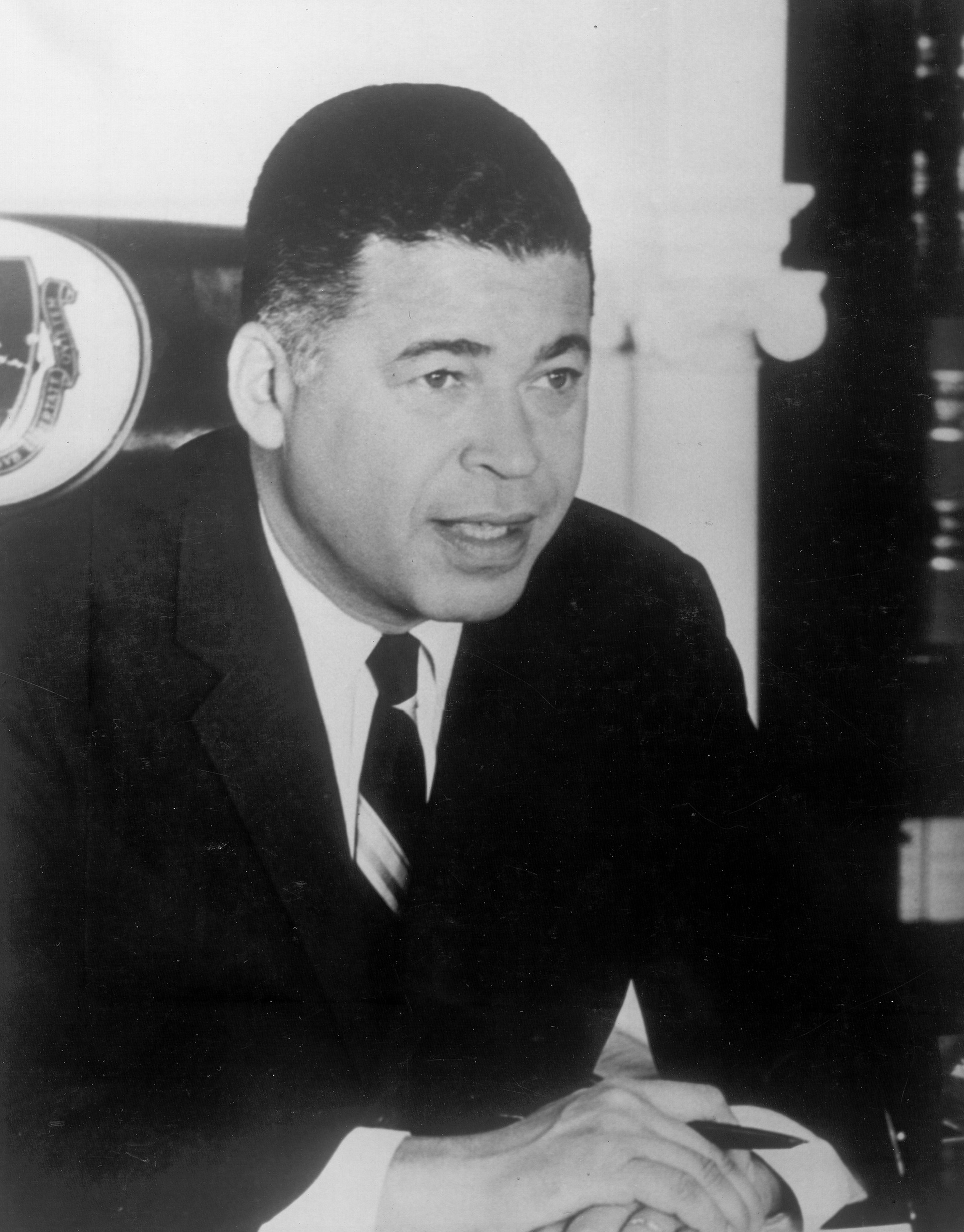
Senator Brooke in the US Senate

==== Relations with the White House and 1972 election ====
Despite Brooke's disagreements with Nixon, the president reportedly respected the senator's abilities; after Nixon's election he had offered to make Brooke a member of his cabinet, or appoint him as ambassador to the UN. The press discussed Brooke as a possible replacement for Spiro Agnew as Nixon's running mate in the 1972 presidential election. While Nixon retained Agnew, Brooke was re-elected in 1972, defeating Democrat John J. Droney by a vote of 64%–35%, which made him the first African American to be re-elected to the United States Senate.

==== Tenure ====
Before the first year of his second term ended, Brooke became the first Republican to call on President Nixon to resign, on November 4, 1973, shortly after the Watergate-related "Saturday night massacre". He repeated the recommendation in a meeting with Nixon at the White House on November 13, 1973. He had risen to become the ranking Republican on the Senate Banking Committee and on two powerful Appropriations subcommittees, Labor, Health and Human Services (HHS) and Foreign Operations. From these positions, Brooke defended and strengthened the programs he supported; for example, he was a leader in enactment of the Equal Credit Opportunity Act, which ensured married women the right to establish credit in their own name.

In 1974, alongside Indiana Senator Birch Bayh, Brooke led the fight to retain Title IX, a 1972 amendment to the Higher Education Act of 1965, which guarantees equal educational opportunity (including athletic participation) to girls and women.

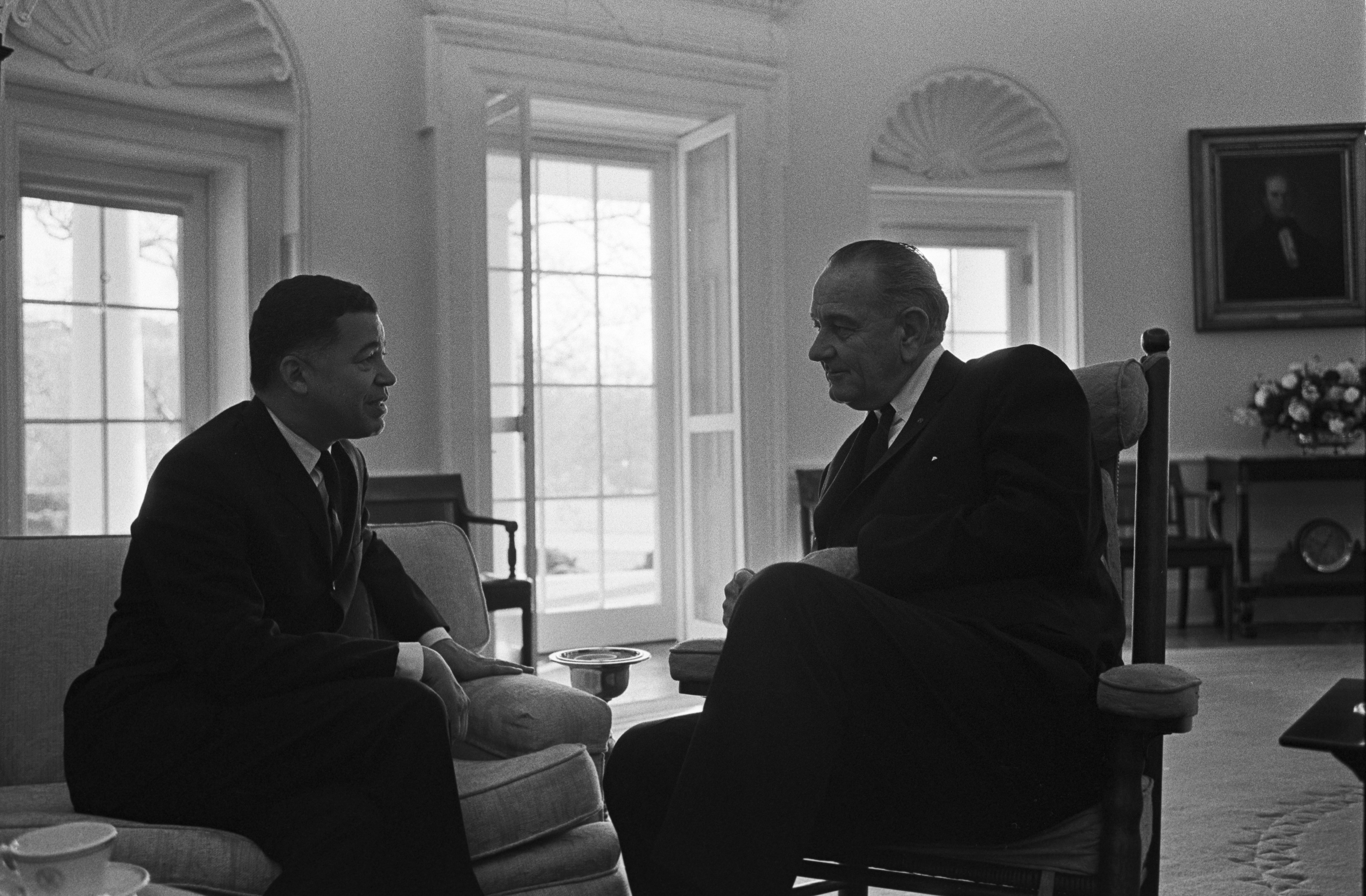
Senator Brooke meeting with President Lyndon B. Johnson in the Oval Office, shortly after taking office in the Senate in 1967

In 1975, with the extension and expansion of the Voting Rights Act at stake, Brooke faced John C. Stennis in "extended debate" and won the Senate's support for the extension. On December 17, 1975, Brooke voted in favor of President Gerald Ford's nomination of John Paul Stevens to the Supreme Court. In 1976, he also took on the role of supporter of wide-scale, legalized abortion. The Appropriations bill for HHS had become a battleground because it funds Medicaid; the Anti-abortion movement fought, eventually successfully, to prohibit funding for abortions of low-income women insured by Medicaid. Brooke led the fight against restrictions in the Senate Appropriations Committee and in the House–Senate Conference until his defeat. The press again speculated on his possible candidacy for the vice presidency as Gerald Ford's running mate in 1976, with Time calling him an "able legislator and a staunch party loyalist".

In Massachusetts, Brooke's support among Catholics weakened due to his stance on abortion. During the 1978 re-election campaign, the state's bishops spoke in opposition to his leading role.

=== Electoral history ===
1966 United States Senate election in Massachusetts
Party	Candidate	Votes	%
Republican	Edward Brooke	1,213,473	60.68%
Democratic	Endicott Peabody	774,761	38.74%
Socialist Labor	Lawrence Gilfedder	6,790	0.34%
Prohibition	Mark R. Shaw	4,833	0.24%
	Others	92	0.01
Total votes		1,999,949	100.00
Republican hold			

1972 United States Senate election in Massachusetts
Party	Candidate	Votes	%
Republican	Edward Brooke (incumbent)	1,505,932	63.53%
Democratic	John J. Droney	823,278	34.73%
Socialist Workers	Donald Gurewitz	41,369	1.75%
	Others	97	0.00
Total votes		2,370,676	100.00
Republican hold			

1978 United States Senate election in Massachusetts
Party	Candidate	Votes	%
Democratic	Paul Tsongas	1,093,283	55.06%
Republican	Edward Brooke (incumbent)	890,584	44.85%
	Others	1,833	0.09%
Total votes		1,985,700	100.00
Democratic gain from Republican			

== Post-Senate life ==
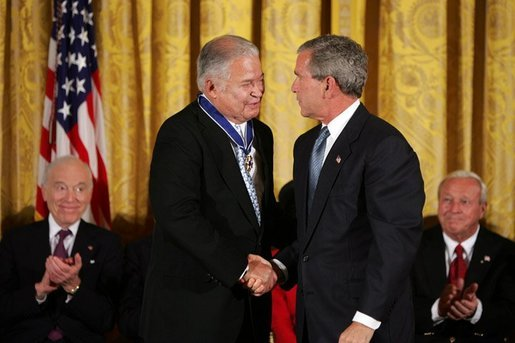
Brooke is congratulated by President George W. Bush at the ceremony for the 2004 recipients of the Presidential Medal of Freedom, East Room of the White House.

After leaving the Senate, Brooke practiced law in Washington, D.C., first as a partner at the Washington firm of O'Connor & Hannan, and later as counsel to Csaplar & Bok in Boston. He also served as chairman of the board of the National Low Income Housing Coalition. In 1984 he was selected as chairman of the Boston Bank of Commerce, and one year later was named to the board of directors of Grumman.

In 1992, a Brooke assistant stated in a plea agreement as part of an investigation into corruption at the Department of Housing and Urban Development that Brooke had falsely answered questions about whether he or the assistant had tried to improperly influence HUD officials on behalf of housing and real estate developers who had paid large consulting fees to Brooke. The HUD investigation ended with no charges being brought against Brooke.

In 1996, Brooke became the first chairman of the World Policy Council, a think tank of Alpha Phi Alpha, an African-American fraternity. The council's purpose is to expand the fraternity's involvement in politics, and social and current policy to encompass international concerns. In 2006 Brooke served as the council's chairman emeritus and was honorary chairman at the Centennial Convention of Alpha Phi Alpha held in Washington, D.C.

== Political positions ==
Brooke was a self-described moderate or liberal Republican, generally referred to as Rockefeller Republicans. On social issues he was a liberal who supported civil rights, women's rights, and civil liberties such as gay rights. On economic issues he was generally fiscally conservative but also believed that "there are things that people can't do for themselves and therefore government must do it for them".

During the 2008 presidential election, Brooke indicated in a WBUR-FM interview that he favored Democratic nominee Barack Obama.

== Awards and honors ==
- Presidential Medal of Freedom
- Congressional Gold Medal, presented on October 28, 2009, two days after Brooke's 90th birthday. At his 2009 Congressional Gold Medal Acceptance speech, Brooke scolded policymakers for excessive partisan bickering.
- Bronze Star Medal
- Adam Clayton Powell Award (Phoenix Award) in 1979
- Jeremy Nicholson Negro Achievement Award, acknowledging his outstanding contributions to the African-American community
- The Edward W. Brooke Courthouse (dedicated June 20, 2000) in Boston; part of the Massachusetts Trial Court system and houses the Central Division of the Boston Municipal Court, Boston Juvenile Court, Family Court, and Boston Housing Court
- In 2002, scholar Molefi Kete Asante listed Brooke on his list of 100 Greatest African Americans.

== Personal life and death ==
Brooke had an affair with broadcast journalist Barbara Walters in the 1970s. Walters stated that the affair was ended to protect their careers from scandal.

Brooke went through a divorce late in his second term. His finances were investigated by the Senate, and John Kerry, then a prosecutor in Middlesex County, announced an investigation into statements Brooke made in the divorce case. Prosecutors eventually determined that Brooke had made false statements about his finances during the divorce, and that they were pertinent, but not material enough to have affected the outcome. Brooke was not charged with a crime, but the negative publicity cost him some support in his 1978 reelection campaign, and as a result he lost to Paul Tsongas.

In September 2002, Brooke was diagnosed with breast cancer and assumed a national role in raising awareness of the disease among men.

On January 3, 2015, Brooke died at his home in Coral Gables, Florida, at age 95. At the time of his death, he was the last living former U.S. senator born in the 1910s. He is buried at Arlington National Cemetery.

== See also ==
- List of African-American firsts
- List of African-American Republicans
- List of African-American United States senators
- List of African-American United States Senate candidates

== Footnotes ==
Legal offices
Preceded by Edward McCormack	Attorney General of Massachusetts; 1963–1967	Succeeded by Ed Martin; Acting
Party political offices
Preceded by Marion Curran Boch	Republican nominee for Secretary of the Commonwealth of Massachusetts; 1960	Succeeded by Harris Reynolds
Preceded by George Michaels	Republican nominee for Attorney General of Massachusetts; 1962, 1964	Succeeded by Elliot Richardson
Preceded by Leverett Saltonstall	Republican nominee for U.S. Senator from Massachusetts (Class 2); 1966, 1972, 1978	Succeeded by Ray Shamie
U.S. Senate
Preceded by Leverett Saltonstall	United States Senator (Class 2) from Massachusetts; 1967–1979; Served alongside: Ted Kennedy	Succeeded by Paul Tsongas
Preceded by John Tower	Ranking Member of the Senate Banking Committee; 1977–1979	Succeeded by Jake Garn
Honorary titles
Preceded by Harry F. Byrd Jr.	Oldest living United States senator (current or former); 2013–2015	Succeeded by John Glenn
