= Victor Francis Jewett =

Massachusetts politician (1881–1936)

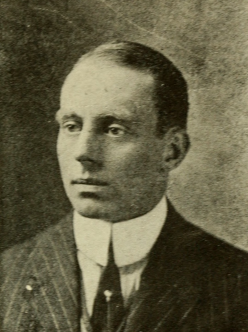

Member of the Massachusetts House of Representatives from the 14th Middlesex district
- In office 1912–1934

Personal details
- Born: November 26, 1881 Tyngsboro, Massachusetts, US
- Died: January 7, 1936 (aged 54) Lowell, Massachusetts, US
- Education: Harvard College (BA)

Victor Francis Jewett (November 16, 1881– January 7, 1936) was an American politician who was the member of the Massachusetts House of Representatives from the 14th Middlesex district.
