= 1948 Massachusetts gubernatorial election =

- November 2, 1948
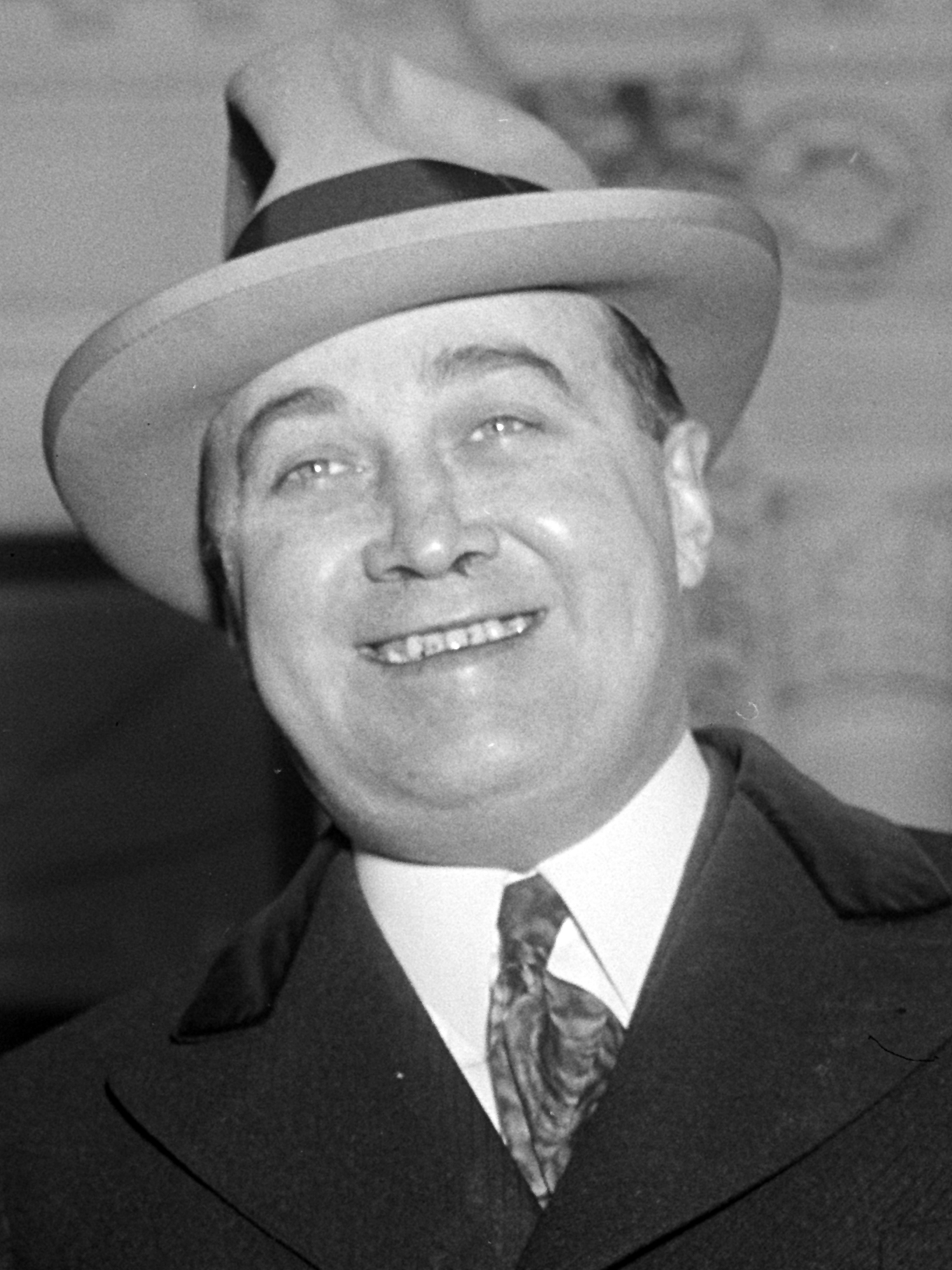

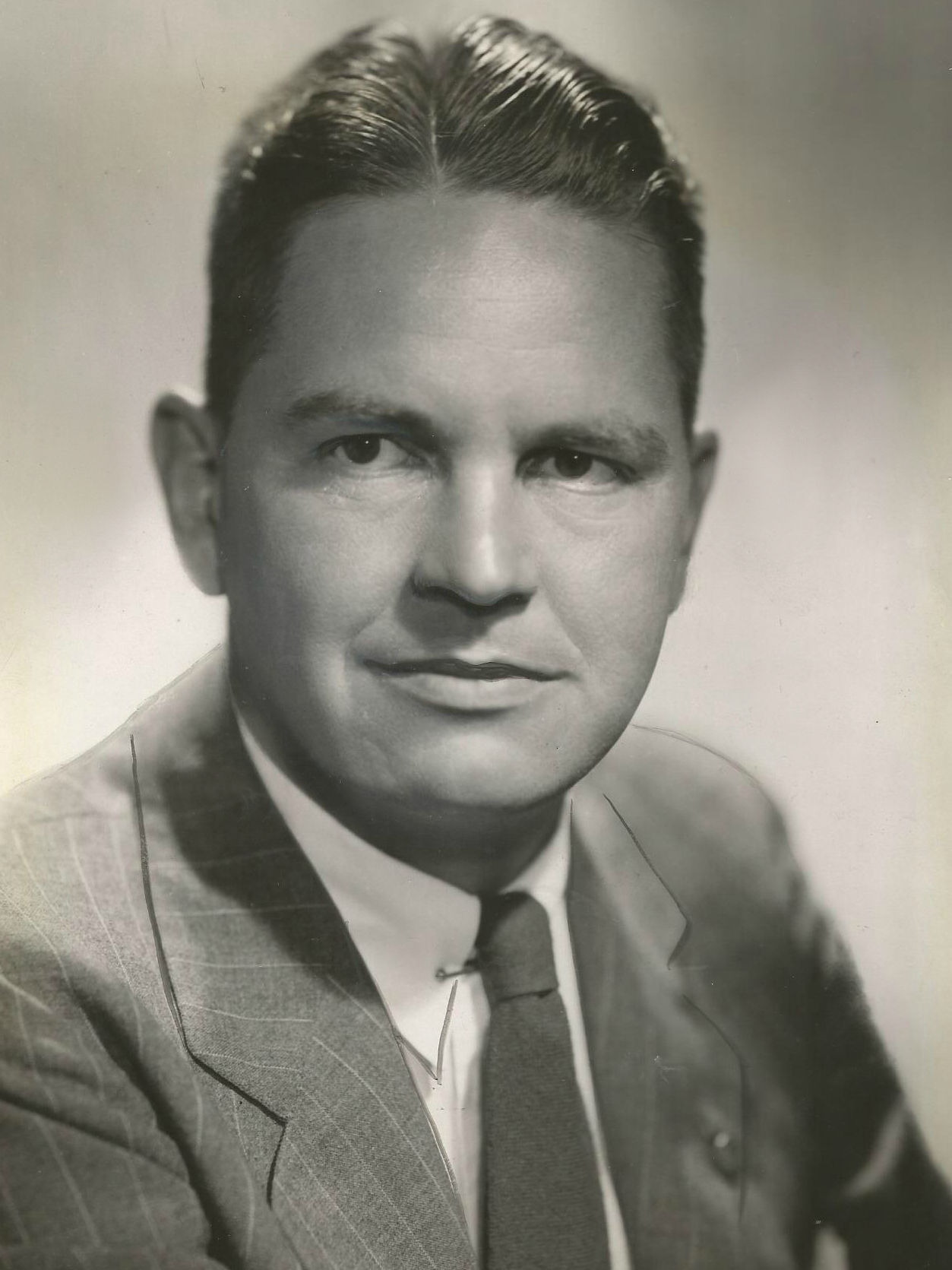
| Nominee | Paul A. Dever | Robert F. Bradford |
| Party | Democratic | Republican |
| Popular vote | 1,239,247 | 849,895 |
| Percentage | 59.03% | 40.49% |
- Dever: 50–60% 60–70% 70–80% 80–90% Cahill: 40–50% 50–60% 60–70% 70–80% 80–90% >90%
Governor before election
Robert F. Bradford
Republican
Elected Governor
Paul A. Dever
Democratic

The 1948 Massachusetts gubernatorial election was held on November 2, 1948. Democrat Paul A. Dever defeated Republican incumbent Robert F. Bradford, Socialist Labor candidate Horace Hillis, and Prohibition candidate Mark R. Shaw.

== Republican primary ==
=== Candidates ===
- Robert F. Bradford, incumbent governor
- Edward Rowe, state senator

=== Results ===
1948 Republican gubernatorial primary
| Party | Candidate | Votes | % |
|---|---|---|---|
| Republican | Robert F. Bradford (incumbent) | 210,574 | 82.86% |
| Republican | Edward Rowe | 43,545 | 17.14% |
| Total votes | | 254,119 | 100.00% |

== Democratic primary ==
=== Candidates ===
- Paul Dever, former attorney general and candidate for lieutenant governor in 1946

==== Withdrew ====
- Maurice Tobin, former governor (withdrew to become United States secretary of labor)

=== Results ===
Democratic gubernatorial primary, 1948
| Party | Candidate | Votes | % | ±% |
|---|---|---|---|---|
| Democratic | Paul A. Dever | 221,727 | 76.65% | |
| Democratic | Maurice J. Tobin | 67,555 | 23.35% | |

== General election ==
=== Results ===
Massachusetts gubernatorial election, 1948
| Party | Candidate | Votes | % | ±% |
|---|---|---|---|---|
| Democratic | Paul A. Dever | 1,239,247 | 59.03% | |
| Republican | Robert F. Bradford (incumbent) | 849,895 | 40.49% | |
| Socialist Labor | Horace Hillis | 7,259 | 0.35% | |
| Prohibition | Mark R. Shaw | 2,841 | 0.14% | |

== See also ==
- 1948 Massachusetts general election
- 1947–1948 Massachusetts legislature
