= James O'Dea Jr. =

American lawyer and politician (1922-1995)

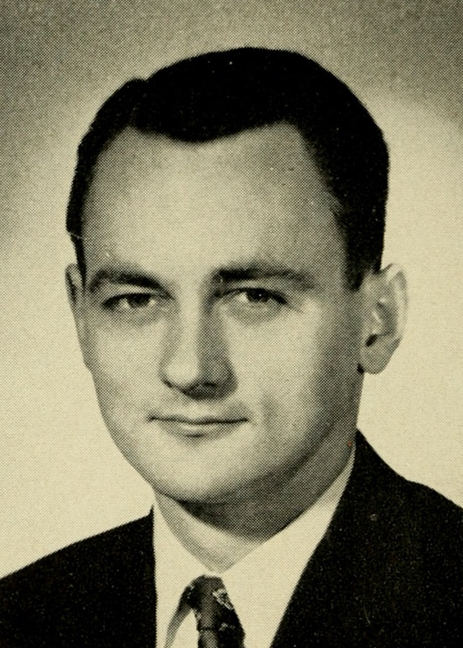

District Attorney of Middlesex County, Massachusetts
- In office 1957–1959
- Preceded by: Ephraim Martin
- Succeeded by: John J. Droney

Member of the Massachusetts House of Representatives from the 15th Middlesex district
- In office 1949–1957
- Preceded by: James J. Bruin
- Succeeded by: Cornelius T. Finnegan Jr.

Personal details
- Born: James Lawrence O'Dea Jr. August 25, 1922 Lowell, Massachusetts
- Died: April 4, 1995 (aged 72) San Francisco
- Party: Democratic
- Spouse(s): Carol Gibbons (1944–1959; divorce); Johanna Mahoney
- Children: 4
- Education: University of Notre Dame; Harvard Law School; Harvard University
- Occupation: Attorney

James Lawrence O'Dea Jr. (August 25, 1922 – April 4, 1995) was an American lawyer and politician who was a member of the Massachusetts House of Representatives and District Attorney of Middlesex County, Massachusetts.

== Early life ==
O'Dea was born in Lowell, Massachusetts on August 25, 1922. His mother died when he was three months old and he was raised by his father and aunt. He graduated from Lowell High School in 1940. He served in the United States Marine Corps during World War II and was awarded the Bronze Star and a Purple Heart for his actions during the Battle of Iwo Jima. He resumed his education after the war and graduated from the University of Notre Dame in 1945 and Harvard Law School in 1948. He later earned a master's degree in political science from Harvard University. He practiced law in Lowell with F. Bradford Morse.

== Political career ==
In 1949, O'Dea was elected in a special election to finish the term of deceased 15th Middlesex district representative James J. Bruin. In 1955 he was made a majority whip, becoming one of the youngest people to hold this office. As a representative, O'Dea worked on labor and penal reform bills and was a leader in the effort to redevelop the state court system.

In 1956, O'Dea ran for Middlesex County District Attorney. He defeated fellow representative John F. Zamparelli in a close Democratic primary and upset Republican incumbent Ephraim Martin to become the first Democrat to hold this office since William J. Corcoran in 1917.

In July and August 1959, O'Dea was absent from the district attorney's office while he interviewed with law firms in the Western United States and established residency in Nevada in order to file for divorce there. On September 11, 1959, Massachusetts Attorney General Edward J. McCormack Jr. announced that O'Dea's residency in Nevada disqualified him from serving as district attorney, as Massachusetts law requires a district attorney to be a resident of the county he represents. McCormack appointed assistant attorney general William H. Sullivan to run the office on an interim basis. O'Dea resigned on September 13, 1959, and Governor Foster Furcolo appointed O'Dea's top assistant, John J. Droney, to succeed him.

== Legal career ==
After leaving office, O'Dea went to work for Melvin Belli and applied to join the State Bar of California. He was admitted to the bar in 1961. He defended civil rights activists in Georgia and Florida as a volunteer attorney for the American Civil Liberties Union during the 1960s and practiced as a personal injury attorney in California until his death on April 4, 1995.
