= 1946 Massachusetts gubernatorial election =

- November 5, 1946
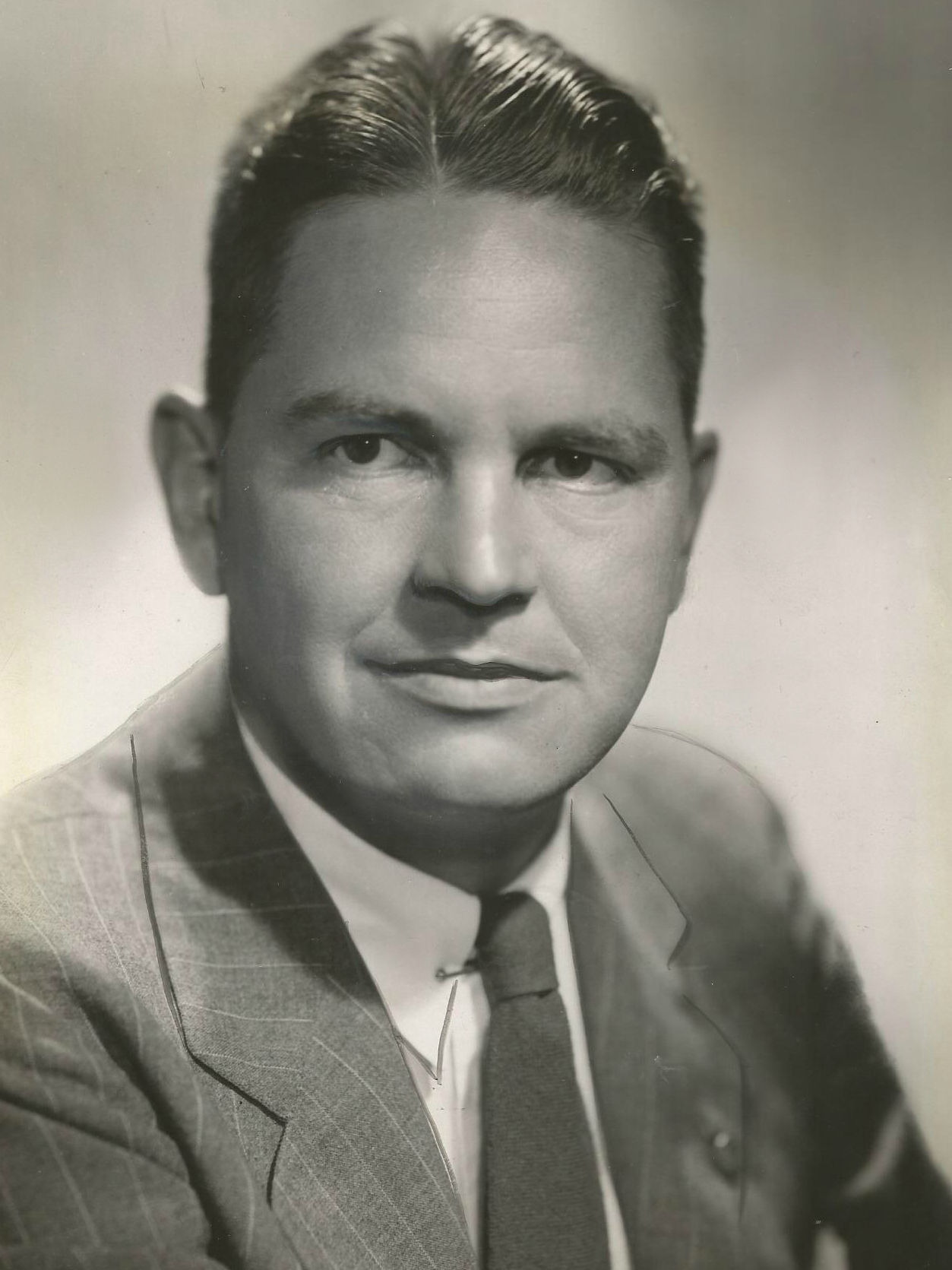

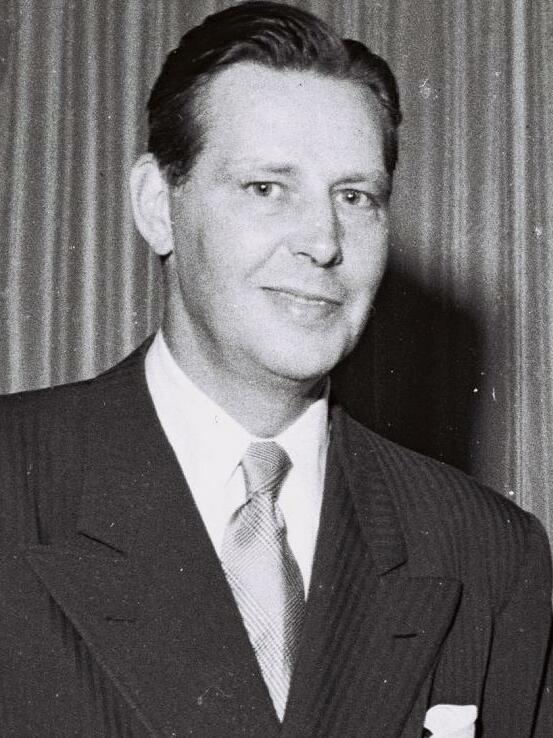
Nominee	Robert F. Bradford	Maurice J. Tobin
Party	Republican	Democratic
Popular vote	911,152	762,743
Percentage	54.12%	45.30%
- Bradford: 40–50% 50–60% 60–70% 70–80% 80–90% >90% Tobin: 40–50% 50–60% 60–70% 70–80%
Governor before election
Maurice J. Tobin
Democratic
Elected Governor
Robert F. Bradford
Republican

The 1946 Massachusetts gubernatorial election was held on November 5, 1946. Republican Robert F. Bradford defeated Democratic incumbent Maurice J. Tobin, Socialist Labor candidate Horace Hillis, and Prohibition candidate Guy S. Williams.

== Democratic primary ==
Governor Tobin defeated Francis D. Harrigan, a senior partner with the law firm of Caulfield, Harrigan and Murray; associate editor of the Association of Trial Lawyers of America's Law Journal; and World War I veteran, for the Democratic nomination.

Democratic gubernatorial primary, 1946
Party	Candidate	Votes	%	±%
Democratic	Maurice J. Tobin (incumbent)	194,529	75.70	
Democratic	Francis D. Harrigan	62,418	24.30	

== Republican primary ==
Lieutenant Governor Robert F. Bradford won the Republican gubernatorial nomination unopposed.

== General election ==
=== Results ===
Massachusetts gubernatorial election, 1946
Party	Candidate	Votes	%	±%
Republican	Robert F. Bradford	911,152	54.12%	
Democratic	Maurice J. Tobin (incumbent)	762,743	45.30%	
Socialist Labor	Horace Hillis	7,140	0.42%	
Prohibition	Guy S. Williams	2,408	0.16%	

== See also ==
- 1946 Massachusetts general election
- 1945–1946 Massachusetts legislature
