= Senator Treadway =

Senator Treadway may refer to:

- Allen T. Treadway (1867–1947), Massachusetts State Senate
- Richard Treadway (1913–2006), Massachusetts State Senate
