= Kerry Healey =

American politician (born 1960)

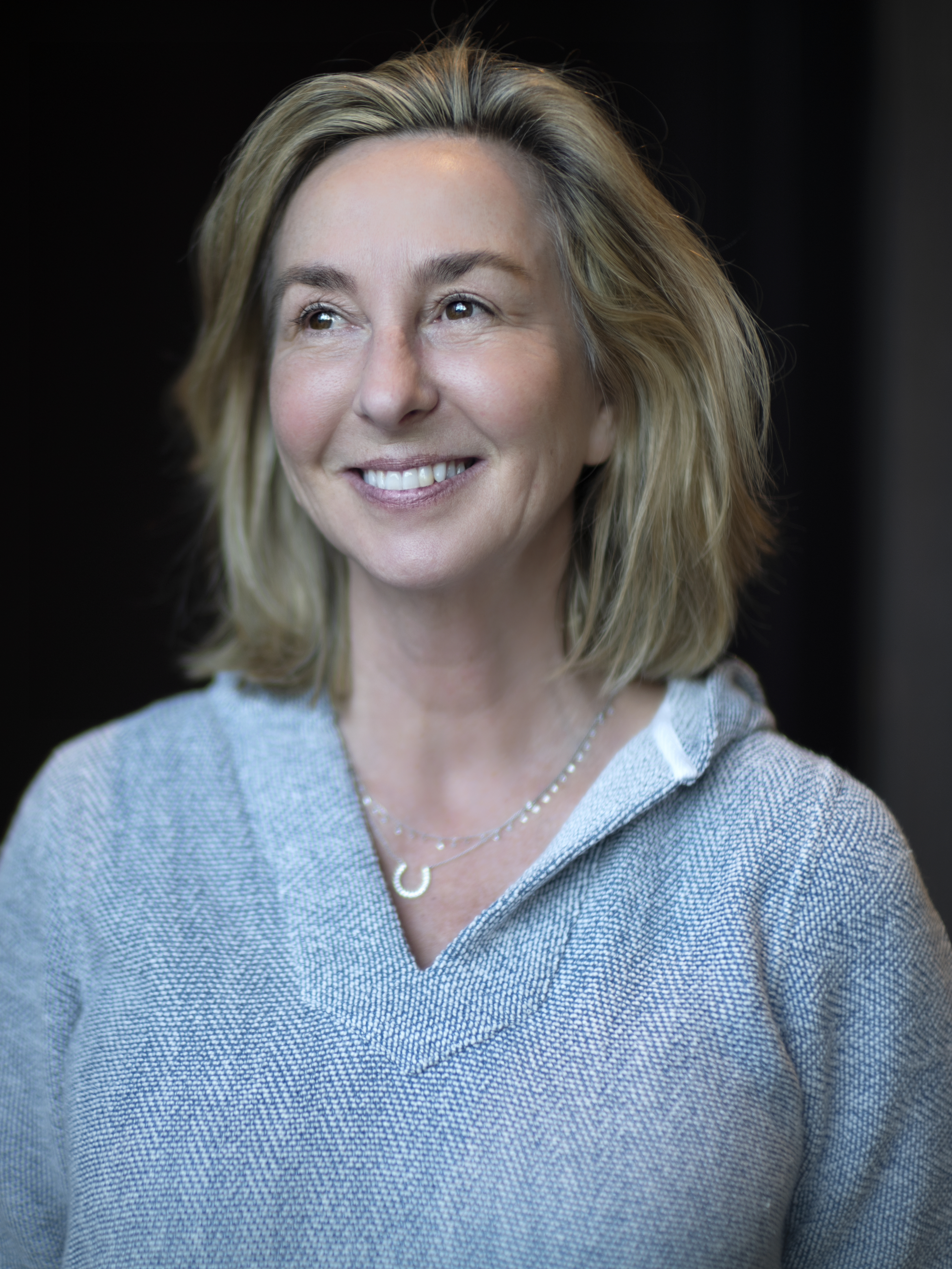
- Healey in 2020

Executive Chair of the Forward Party
- Incumbent
- Assumed office January 11, 2024
- Preceded by: Position established

President of Babson College
- In office July 1, 2013 – July 1, 2019
- Preceded by: Leonard Schlesinger
- Succeeded by: Stephen Spinelli Jr.

70th Lieutenant Governor of Massachusetts
- In office January 2, 2003 – January 4, 2007
- Governor: Mitt Romney
- Preceded by: Jane Swift
- Succeeded by: Tim Murray

Chair of the Massachusetts Republican Party
- In office 2001–2002
- Preceded by: Brian Cresta
- Succeeded by: Jean Inman (Acting)

Personal details
- Born: Kerry Murphy; April 30, 1960 (age 66) Omaha, Nebraska, U.S.
- Party: Forward (since 2023)
- Other political affiliations: Republican (1978–2021); Independent (2021–2023)
- Spouse: Sean Healey (m. 1985; div. 2015)
- Children: 2
- Education: Harvard University (AB); Trinity College, Dublin (PhD)

Kerry Murphy Healey (born April 30, 1960) is an American politician and educator serving as President Emerita of Babson College. She previously served as the 70th lieutenant governor of Massachusetts from 2003 to 2007 under Governor Mitt Romney. A former member of the Republican Party, she was the party's nominee for Governor of Massachusetts in the 2006 gubernatorial election, but was defeated by democrat Deval Patrick.

From 2001 to 2002 and 2012–2013, Healey served as the Republican National Committeewoman for the state of Massachusetts. Healey currently serves on the boards of public companies, universities, cultural organizations and the Forward Party. She was the inaugural president of the Milken Institute's Center for Advancing the American Dream in Washington, D.C., 2019–2022. She served as a special advisor for Mitt Romney's Presidential Campaign in 2012. She then served as the president of Babson College for six years, retiring in 2019. She left the Republican Party on January 7, 2021, and joined the Forward Party in June 2023.

== Early life and education ==
Murphy was born on April 30, 1960, in Omaha, Nebraska. She grew up in Ormond Beach, Florida and is the only child of Shirley and Edward Murphy (1919–2005). Her father served during World War II and retired as a lieutenant colonel in the United States Army Reserve after 27 years of service. He also worked as a residential real estate developer. Her mother worked as a public elementary school teacher.

When Healey was 15, her father suffered a severe heart attack that rendered him unable to work for the rest of his life. This put a financial strain on the family and led Healey to work a number of part-time jobs. Healey also served as class president and student council president at Seabreeze High School.

When she was 16, Healey enrolled in Daytona Beach Community College and began to take classes in computer science. She was hired to help the Daytona Beach News-Journal become one of the first newspapers to transition from typewriters to computerized word processing.

After high school, Healey attended Harvard University with the help of a scholarship. There, she served as the membership secretary of the Harvard Republicans Club and was involved in theater. Healey graduated from Harvard in 1982 with an A.B. in government.

After graduating from Harvard, Healey was awarded a scholarship by Rotary International and received a Ph.D. in political science and law from Trinity College in Dublin, Ireland in 1991. While in Dublin, she met fellow Rotary Scholar and Harvard alum Sean Healey, whom she married in 1985.

Upon completing her studies at Trinity College, Healey spent 1985 as a visiting researcher in the International and Comparative Legal Studies Program at Harvard Law School.

== Early career ==
In 1986, Healey joined Abt Associates, based in Cambridge, Massachusetts, where she performed policy research for the U.S. Department of Justice related to child abuse and neglect, domestic violence, gang violence, victim and witness intimidation and the prosecution of drug crimes. Following her time at Abt Associates, Healey served as an adjunct professor in criminal justice at the University of Massachusetts Lowell.

Her first foray into politics occurred in 1998, when she ran for state representative in the 6th Essex District – representing her hometown of Beverly, Massachusetts – challenging and losing to incumbent Democrat Michael P. Cahill. That same year, Healey was elected to the Republican State Committee. She ran against Cahill unsuccessfully again in 2000.

Despite losing her first two elections, Healey became popular among Republicans and was elected chairwoman of the Massachusetts Republican State Committee in 2001, the second woman to head the Massachusetts GOP. Soon after beginning her term as chairwoman, the Massachusetts GOP began courting Mitt Romney – then the president and CEO of the 2002 Winter Olympics – to take over acting-governor Jane Swift's position as the Republican candidate in the upcoming gubernatorial election.

After Swift exited the race, Romney endorsed Healey in her primary race for lieutenant governor against former U.S. Senate candidate and former party chairman Jim Rappaport, ultimately winning by a thirty-point margin. The Romney-Healey team was successful, and Healey was elected lieutenant governor on November 5, 2002.

== Lieutenant governor ==
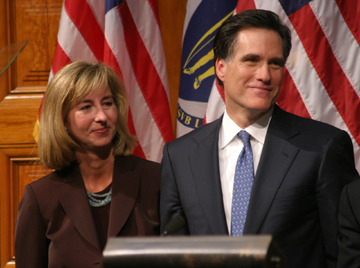
Healey and Mitt Romney in 2004

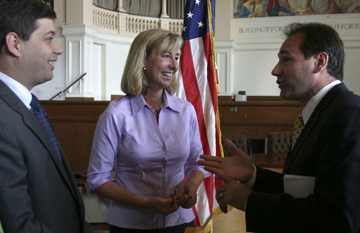
Healey with Bruce Tarr and John Cogliano in 2004

Kerry Murphy Healey was sworn into office as the lieutenant governor of Massachusetts on January 2, 2003. She, along with Governor Mitt Romney, opted not to take a salary during their respective four-year terms.

Healey served as the governor's liaison to cities and the Republican party. Upon taking office, Romney and Healey focused on erasing an estimated $600 million budget gap for fiscal year 2003. The state also faced an estimated $2 billion to $3 billion shortfall for fiscal year 2004.

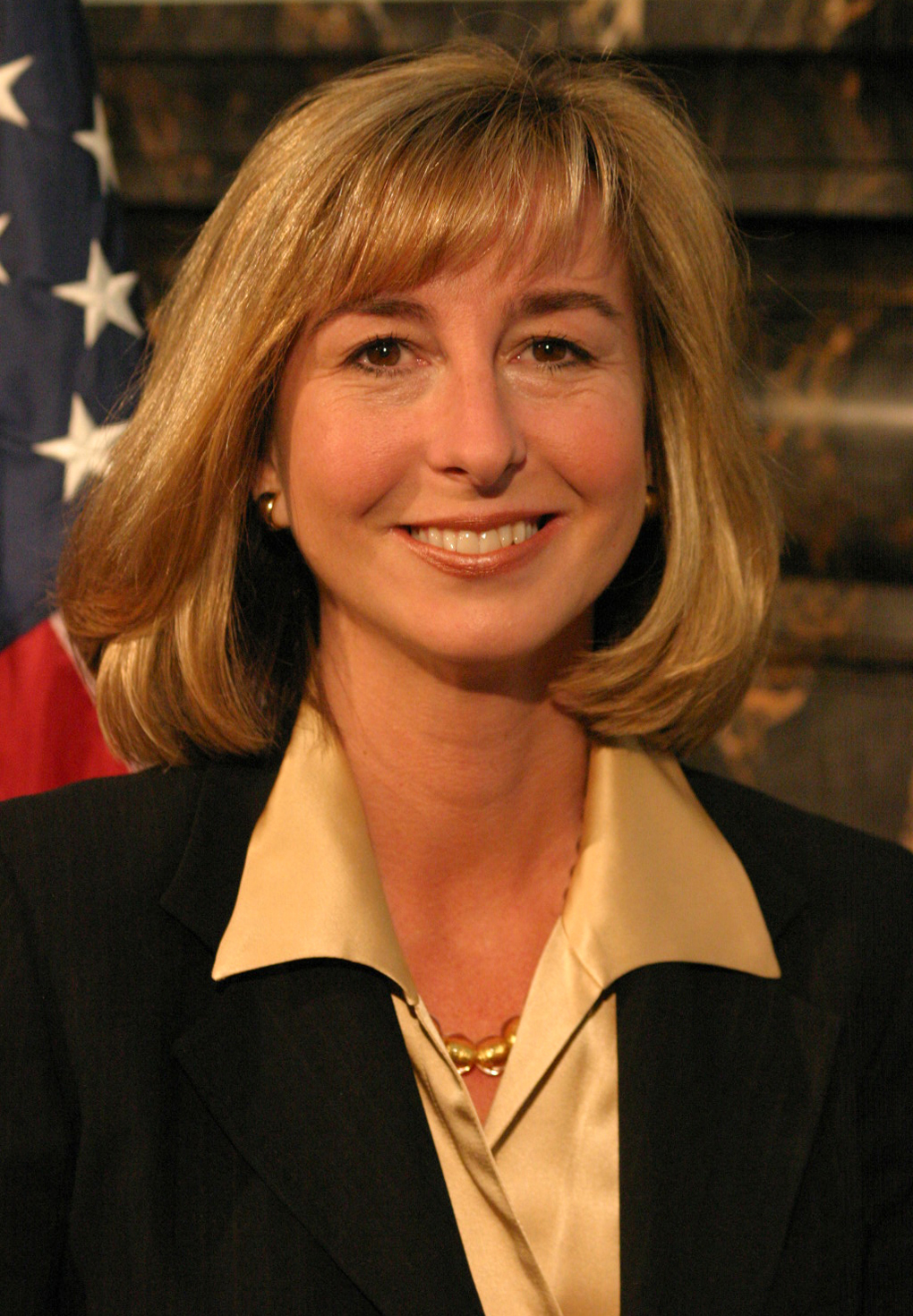
Official portrait, 2004

In mid-January 2003, the Massachusetts State Legislature approved expanded budget-cutting powers for the Romney administration. As Romney's second-in-command, Healey was the liaison between the local government and the state house, working to reduce the burden of cuts to state aid to municipal governments.

Healey was credited with creating a package of legislative proposals, called the Municipal Relief Act, that reduced expensive and burdensome state mandates, easing the pain of cuts to state aid by about $75 million. The administration closed the budget gap and ended fiscal year 2004 with a budget surplus of $700 million. Official state figures showed that Massachusetts ended fiscal year 2005 with a $594.4 million surplus. In 2006, the surplus was officially $720.9 million according to state statistics. Additionally, the administration left the state with a "rainy day" stabilization fund with a balance of $2.1 billion.

These surpluses were attained without breaking the Romney-Healey campaign promise that they would not raise taxes. On the heels of the Municipal Relief Act, Healey headed a bipartisan commission that "revised management practices for public construction projects designed to save money, increase accountability, improve safety, and give more control to local officials." In addition, Healey served as chair of the state's six Regional Competitiveness Councils (RCC), which coordinated and provided recommendations for economic development initiatives across the state.

As lieutenant governor, Healey was known for her hands-on approach to addressing the concerns of cities and towns and her responsiveness to the concerns of local officials. Even with the cuts to the state budget that were made to avoid a budget crisis, local aid increased by 17 percent, and school assistance increased by 7 percent under Healey's watch.

Healey headed the Governor's Commission on Criminal Justice Innovation, a bipartisan, multi-agency group focused on reforming the Massachusetts criminal justice system. She testified in favor of a bill, later passed as Ally's Law, that expanded the definition of crimes considered "sexually dangerous and allowed dangerous sex offenders to be locked up for life.

She recommended and worked to champion programs to supervise and support inmates transitioning back to society, including proposals for mandatory post-release supervision. As lieutenant governor, Healey sought or signed laws that curbed gang violence, enhanced witness safety, expanded the rights of those wrongfully convicted, advanced technology to track sex offenders, curbed substance abuse, strengthened law enforcement's ability to combat opioid abuse, and expanded protection from sex offenders.

In 2005, Healey supported a proposed ban on same-sex marriage in Massachusetts, in favor of civil unions. Healey has since made her support for same-sex marriage known. As Babson College president, she marched in the 2013 Boston Pride Parade with the school's LGBTQ student organization.

Healey supported the death penalty. She was endorsed by Massachusetts' top gun owners group, but she and Governor Romney worked in a bipartisan manner on gun control, including extending the ban on semi-automatic weapons.

Healey supported immigration status checks during regular police traffic stops and deportation of illegal immigrants. She opposed in-state tuition for illegal immigrant students.

== Gubernatorial campaign ==
After Governor Romney stated that he would not seek re-election, Healey was dubbed the presumptive Republican nominee for the state's highest elected office. However, Healey faced early competition from within her own party from Republican Christy Mihos, the former owner of a chain of convenience stores. The state Republican Party tried to steer Mihos into a race against Senator Ted Kennedy, and also guaranteed him a spot on the ballot in the Republican primary for the governorship, yet Mihos opted to launch his campaign as an independent, making the general election a three-person race; Deval Patrick was the Democratic nominee. Early polls showed Patrick with as much as a 25-point lead over Healey following a competitive Democratic primary, despite most voters backing Healey's support of rolling back the state income tax to five percent, denying in-state tuition rates at state colleges to undocumented immigrants, denying driver's licenses to such residents and requiring photo identification for voting.

=== Campaign ads ===
Following the primaries, a TV ad by Healey criticized her gubernatorial rival, Deval Patrick, for serving as the lawyer for the killer of a Florida highway patrol officer gunned down on a rural road. In 1985, Patrick, then a lawyer for the NAACP Legal Defense Fund, worked to reverse the death sentence imposed on killer Carl Ray Songer. "Her approach is to protect the victims and Deval Patrick's approach is always to protect convicted criminals," said Healey's campaign manager Tim O'Brien. Now, under Florida law, Songer is eligible for parole.

The "Cop Killer" campaign ad was featured on a segment of the Opie and Anthony radio show about negative campaign ads. The ad was criticized on the air for its lack of information about the case. She criticized Patrick for having written to the Massachusetts Parole Board on behalf of Benjamin LaGuer, who proclaims innocence for a 1983 sexual assault, and for corresponding with the inmate. During the heat of the campaign two unidentified men visited LaGuer in prison and allegedly offered him $100,000 if would turn that correspondence over to them.

Critics of Healey's ad argued that it confused the proper role of criminal defence lawyers in the judicial system. Patrick argued that Songer hadn't been sentenced fairly because he wasn't able to present evidence of his good character during the sentencing hearing. "The federal appeals court agreed with him that [Songer's] death sentence violated the Constitution of the United States," said Patrick spokesman Richard Chacon in a statement. Patrick's campaign also pointed out that Healey's running mate, Reed Hillman, lobbied a parole board on behalf of friend James W. Mitchell, who was accused of assaulting a police officer.

Patrick also criticized Healey's campaign for leaking details of the 1993 rape of Patrick's sister by her husband. Healey's campaign denied any involvement in the leak, and in turn accused Patrick of initiating a "smear campaign" over the issue.

== Post-lieutenant gubernatorial activities ==
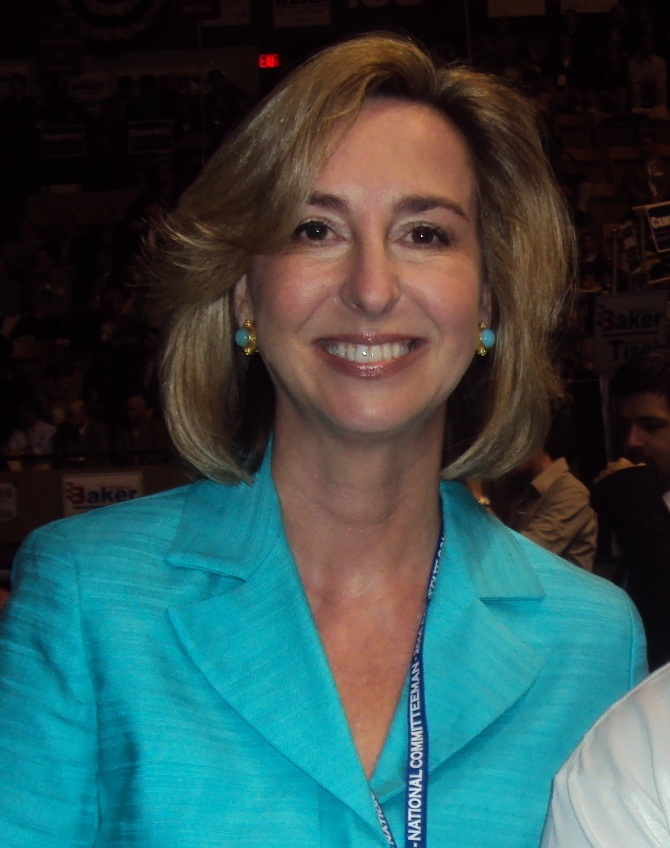
Healey in 2010

Healey speaking at a rally for Mitt Romney in 2012

In the spring of 2007, Healey was a fellow at the Harvard Kennedy School of Government's Institute of Politics and was a visiting fellow at Harvard Kennedy School's Center for Public Leadership for the following fall.

In 2008, Secretary of State Condoleezza Rice appointed Healey to the executive committee of the Public-Private Partnership for Justice Reform in Afghanistan (PPP). The partnership aims to promote a democratic rule of law in Afghanistan by providing scholarships, training, and other educational resources to Afghan legal professionals. Secretary of State Hillary Clinton reappointed Healey in 2009. Healey chaired the PPP's Afghan Women Lawyers' Training Conference held in California and Washington, D.C., and in 2010, she led the Afghan Defense Lawyer Training Program in Boston and Washington, D.C. Healey currently serves as president of the board of the Friends of the PPP, a 501(c)(3) non-profit that assists the PPP in achieving its goals in carrying out its work with Afghan judges and lawyers, as well as fundraising.

In 2009, Healey partnered with Ambassador Swanee Hunt to co-chair the Political Parity project. This nonpartisan initiative works to increase the number of women in high-level state and national political offices, through programs including the Media Accountability Project and the Women's Appointment Project. Political Parity has stated that its goal is to "double the number of women at the highest levels of U.S. government by 2022." The project is completely nonpartisan; Political Parity does not endorse, fund, or train potential candidates.

On August 28, 2009, The Boston Globe reported that Healey was considering running in the special election for the US Senate seat formerly held by Edward M. Kennedy. On September 6, 2009, Healey announced that she would not run for the vacant post.

In 2010, Healey was the creator and host of Shining City, which was featured on the New England Sports Network. The show featured and celebrated science, technology, and innovation in the New England area.

Healey was also a special advisor and the foreign policy coordinator for Romney for president. In 2008, she was a senior advisor for Romney for president, coordinating teams of expert advisors on domestic and foreign policy issues. Healey also serves on the advisory boards of the Harvard Kennedy School's Tubman Institute on State and Local Government and the MIT Collaborative's Healthcare Visionary Council. She currently serves or has served on numerous non-profit boards, including the Pioneer Institute, the National Center on Family Homelessness, Milton Academy, the American University of Afghanistan, National State Leadership Council, Caritas Cubana, and the Commonwealth Shakespeare Company. In April 2012, she was elected to the post of National Committeewoman by the Massachusetts Republican Party.

Healey had been cited for a cabinet role in a Mitt Romney Presidential administration, had Romney been elected.

From 2019-2022, Healey served as the President of the Milken Center's Institute for Advancing the American Dream located in Washington, D.C. The mission of the center is to expand access to the American Dream and tell the story of America through the eyes of those who came seeking opportunity, freedom, and a better life for themselves and their families. The visitor center is scheduled to open to the public in the summer of 2025 across from the U.S. Treasury and the White House.

In October 2022, Issue One launched its Council for Responsible Social Media project to address the negative mental, civic, and public health impacts of social media in the United States with Healey as co-chair along with former House Democratic Caucus Leader Dick Gephardt.

In June 2023, it was announced that Healey had joined the board of directors of the Forward Party.

== Personal life ==
Healey was married to Sean Healey, CEO of Affiliated Managers Group (AMG). They have two children, Alex and Averill.

== Electoral history ==
- 1998 campaign for 6th Essex State Representative District
  - Rep. Michael Cahill (D), 66%
  - Kerry Healey (R), 34%
- 2000 campaign for 6th Essex State Representative District
  - Rep. Michael Cahill (D), 60%
  - Kerry Healey (R), 36%
- 2002 Republican Primary for Lt. Governor
  - Kerry Healey (R), 64%
  - Jim Rappaport (R), 36%
- 2002 campaign for Governor/Lt. Governor
  - Mitt Romney/Kerry Healey (R), 50%
  - Shannon O'Brien/Chris Gabrieli (D), 45%
  - Others, 5%
- 2006 campaign for Governor/Lt. Governor
  - Deval Patrick/Tim Murray (D), 56%
  - Kerry Healey/Reed Hillman (R), 35%
  - Others, 9%

== See also ==
- List of female lieutenant governors in the United States
- Governorship of Mitt Romney

Party political offices
Preceded by Brian Cresta	Chair of the Massachusetts Republican Party; 2001–2002	Succeeded by Jean Inman; Acting
Preceded by Jane Swift	Republican nominee for Lieutenant Governor of Massachusetts; 2002	Succeeded by Reed V. Hillman
Preceded by Mitt Romney	Republican nominee for Governor of Massachusetts; 2006	Succeeded by Charlie Baker
Political offices
Preceded by Jane Swift	Lieutenant Governor of Massachusetts; 2003–2007	Succeeded by Tim Murray
