= Jeanne Kangas =

American lawyer and politician

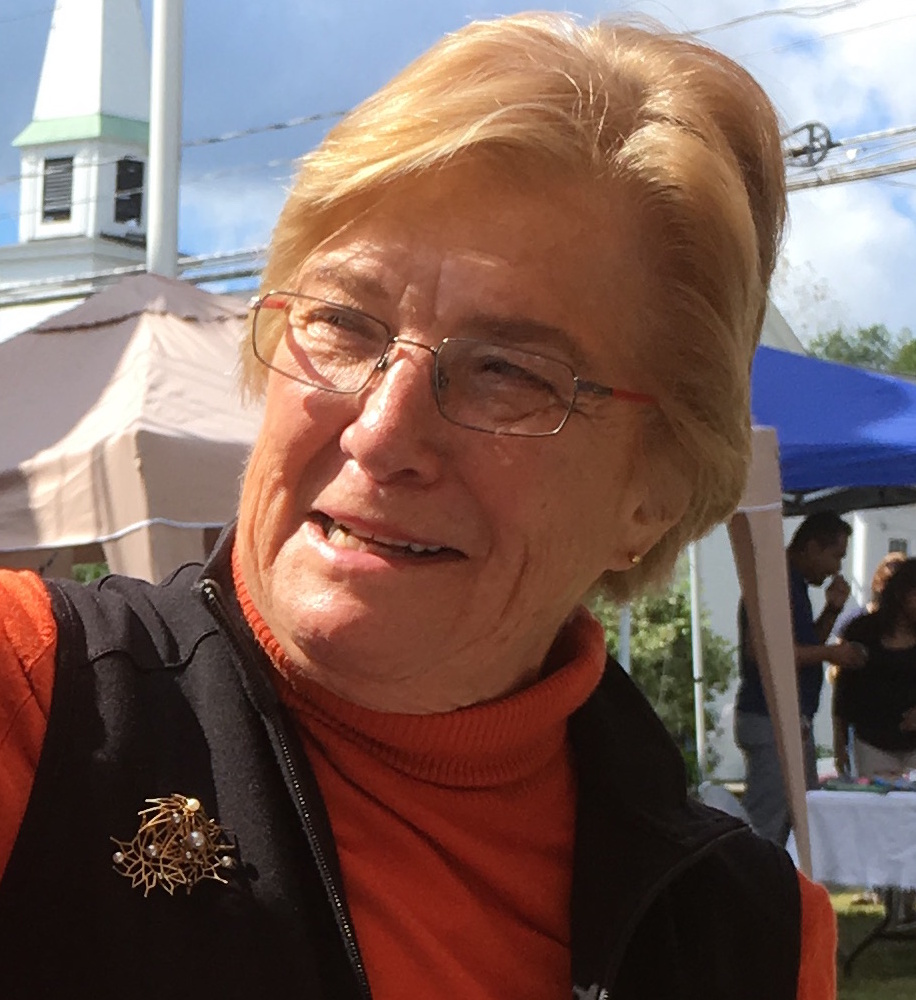
- Kangas in 2017
- Born: August 1940; Boxborough, Massachusetts, U.S.
- Died: January 10, 2023 (aged 82); Boxborough, Massachusetts, U.S.
- Education: Simmons College (BA); Suffolk University Law School (JD)
- Occupations: lawyer; politician
- Spouses: Waino Kangas (m. 1960, divorced) Robin Lazarow (m. 2009)
- Children: 4

Jeanne Steele Kangas (August 1940 – January 10, 2023) was an American lawyer and political figure. She was the interim Chair of the Massachusetts Republican Party in 2011 and the first woman elected to the Board of Selectmen in Boxborough, Massachusetts.

== Early life and education ==
Kangas was born in 1940 to Avery Walker Steele and Anne Louise Kirby Steele Atwood. She had a twin sister, Joanne, and two other sisters and a brother. She graduated from Simmons College in 1975 and Suffolk University Law School in 1983. She entered private practice with the firm Arnold & Kangas centered on family law where she worked until 2017. She married Waino Kangas in 1960 and the couple had four children.

== Politics ==
Kangas worked on the finance committee of the town of Boxborough and ran unsuccessfully twice for State Representative—a position previously held by her father—as a Republican in 1970 and 1972. Kangas was appointed to the Governor's Council on the Status of Women in 1972 and began compiling statistics on the gender of elected officials in Massachusetts towns.

She was elected as Boxborough's first female Selectman in 1973 at a time when only 10% of Selectmen in the state were female. She advocated for being called a Selectwoman when she was in her official position. A frequent advocate for gender equity, she said "I'm looking forward to the day when unqualified and incompetent women will be elected and appointed to the same positions that unqualified and incompetent men have been elected and appointed to for years." She was elected as the vice president of the Middlesex County Selectmen's Association in 1977.

Kangas was active in the Massachusetts Republican party and rose to the position of Vice Chair of MassGOP acting as interim chair in 2011. She disagreed with some of the Republican platform positions, being pro-choice and pro-marriage equality, and worked for reform within the party. She was a frequent delegate to the Republican National Convention, supporting Ford in 1976.

== Civic work ==
Kangas was the President of the Boxborough Historical Society where she was active in preserving the Levi Wetherbee Steele Farm, chairing the Steele Farm Advisory Committee. She was a member of the Boxborough Grange and the Old Concord Chapter of the Daughters of the American Revolution. She served on the board of the Appalachian Mountain Club. She was co-founder of the Network for Women's Lives, an advocacy group providing intervention and support for victims of domestic violence.
