= Archibald R. Giroux =

American stockbroker and politician (1897–1968)

- Born: October 19, 1897; Somerville, Massachusetts, U.S.
- Died: October 15, 1968 (aged 70); Cambridge, Massachusetts, U.S.
- Occupations: Stockbroker and politician

Archibald Raphael Giroux (October 19, 1897 – October 15, 1968) was an American stockbroker and politician who served as president of the Boston Stock Exchange and chairman of the Massachusetts Republican Party.

== Early life ==
Giroux was born on October 19, 1897, in Somerville, Massachusetts, to Arthur E. and Jessie (Emery) Giroux. His mother later remarried Arthur E. Haley, also of Somerville. Giroux graduated from Somerville High School and Dartmouth College.

== World War I ==
On April 28, 1917, Giroux enlisted in the American Ambulance Field Service. He served on the French front from April 28 to October 28, 1917. Following the Halifax Explosion, Giroux delivered a fleet of ambulances for the Boston Red Cross to Halifax, Nova Scotia. On April 22, 1918, he enlisted in the Royal Air Force. He trained at the Toronto Ground School, the No. 7 Fighting School in Eastchurch, and RAF Turnberry. He was commissioned a Second Lieutenant on November 21, 1918. He was released from the RAF on February 25, 1919, and returned to the United States. Later that year he served as a volunteer police officer during the Boston police strike.

His brother, Ernest A. Giroux, was a First Lieutenant in the United States Army Air Service who was killed in action on May 22, 1918.

== Boston Stock Exchange ==
Giroux was admitted to the Boston Stock Exchange on March 31, 1930. In 1939 he was elected vice president of the exchange. Three years later he was elected president of the BSE.

== Politics ==
In 1935, Giroux was elected to the Lexington, Massachusetts, board of selectmen. In 1936 he was an unsuccessful candidate for the Massachusetts House of Representatives. In 1940 he was elected to the Middlesex County Commission.

== World War II ==
In 1943, Giroux was commissioned a captain in the military government branch of the United States Army Provost Marshal General's office. He served in North Africa, Sardinia, and London. He was assigned as an American military government officer with the British infantry in Normandy until the Allies entered Germany. He then served as commander of a British military government unit that was part of a joint British-American operation. He returned to the United States Army as the commanding officer of a military government detachment in Hof, Bavaria. From 1945 to 1946 his son, Ernest A. Giroux Jr., served in the same unit. Giroux was discharged in 1946 with the rank of Lieutenant Colonel. He was awarded the Croix de Guerre by the French government for his service in Normandy.

== Later life ==
On March 14, 1946, Giroux was elected chairman of the Massachusetts Republican State Committee. He did not run for reelection in 1947 and was succeeded by Lloyd B. Waring. He served as campaign manager of Governor Robert F. Bradford unsuccessful 1948 reelection campaign.

Giroux served as vice president and general manager of Haley-Cate Co. from 1947 until his death on October 15, 1968. He was buried in Mount Auburn Cemetery.

Business positions
Preceded by John Yerxa	President of the Boston Stock Exchange; 1942–1943	Succeeded by Stearns Poor
Party political offices
Preceded by George B. Rowell	Chairman of the Massachusetts Republican Party; 1946–1947	Succeeded by Lloyd B. Waring
