= 1970 United States Senate election in Massachusetts =

- November 3, 1970
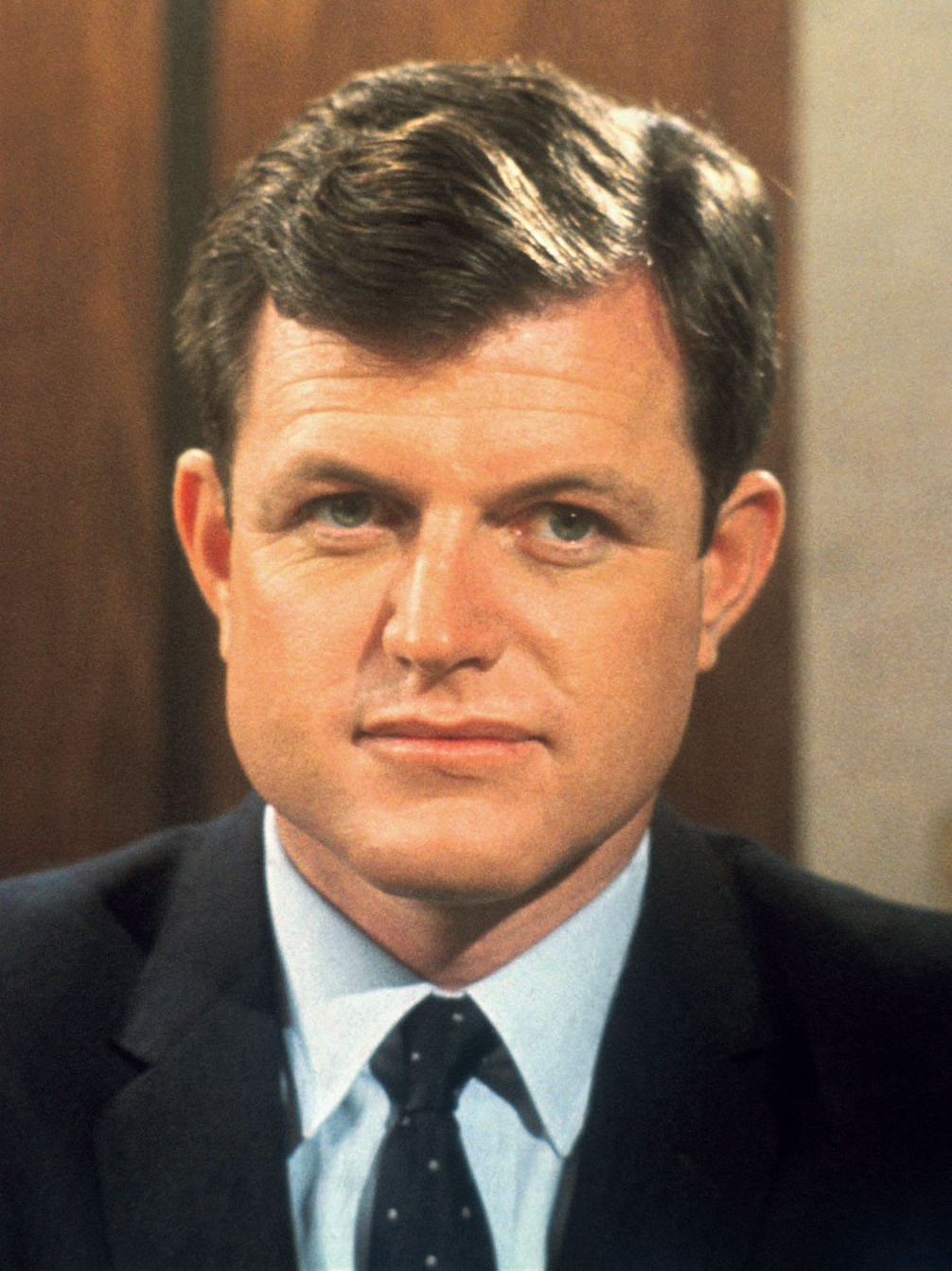

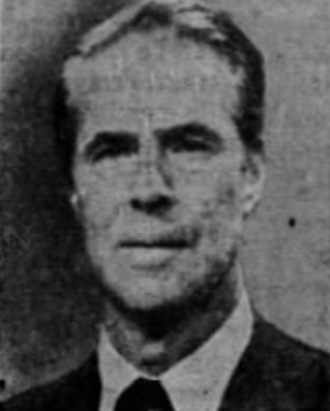
Nominee	Ted Kennedy	Josiah Spaulding
Party	Democratic	Republican
Popular vote	1,202,856	715,978
Percentage	62.16%	37.00%
- Kennedy: 40–50% 50–60% 60–70% 70–80% 80–90% Spaulding: 40–50% 50–60% 60–70% 70–80% 80–90%
U.S. senator before election
Ted Kennedy
Democratic
Elected U.S. Senator
Ted Kennedy
Democratic

The 1970 United States Senate election in Massachusetts was held on November 3, 1970. The incumbent Democratic Senator Ted Kennedy defeated his challengers. This was Kennedy's first election run since the 1969 Chappaquiddick incident. Kennedy won 62.2% of the vote, down from the 74.3% that he won in the previous election in 1964, indicating that Chappaquiddick did affect his popularity.

This was the last election in which Ted Kennedy lost any Massachusetts county, as well as the only regularly scheduled one in which he did not sweep the commonwealth's counties. Spaulding carried Barnstable, Dukes, Franklin, and Nantucket Counties.

== Republican primary ==
=== Candidates ===
- Josiah Spaulding, businessman
- John J. McCarthy, Commissioner of Administration and Finance

=== Results ===
1970 Republican U.S. Senate primary
Party	Candidate	Votes	%
Republican	Josiah Spaulding	109,306	57.32%
Republican	John J. McCarthy	81,356	42.66%
Total votes		190,662	100.00%

== General election ==
=== Candidates ===
- Ted Kennedy, incumbent U.S. Senator since 1962 (Democratic)
- Lawrence Gilfedder (Socialist Labor)
- Mark R. Shaw, perennial candidate and Prohibition nominee for vice president in 1964 (Prohibition)
- Josiah Spaulding, businessman (Republican)

=== Results ===
General election
Party	Candidate	Votes	%	±%
Democratic	Edward M. Kennedy (incumbent)	1,202,856	62.16%	▼12.1
Republican	Josiah Spaulding	715,978	37.00%	▲11.58
Socialist Labor	Lawrence Gilfedder	10,378	0.54%	▲0.33
Prohibition	Mark R. Shaw	5,944	0.31%	▲0.19

== See also ==
- United States Senate elections, 1970
- 1970 in the United States
