= 1990 United States Senate election in Massachusetts =

- November 6, 1990
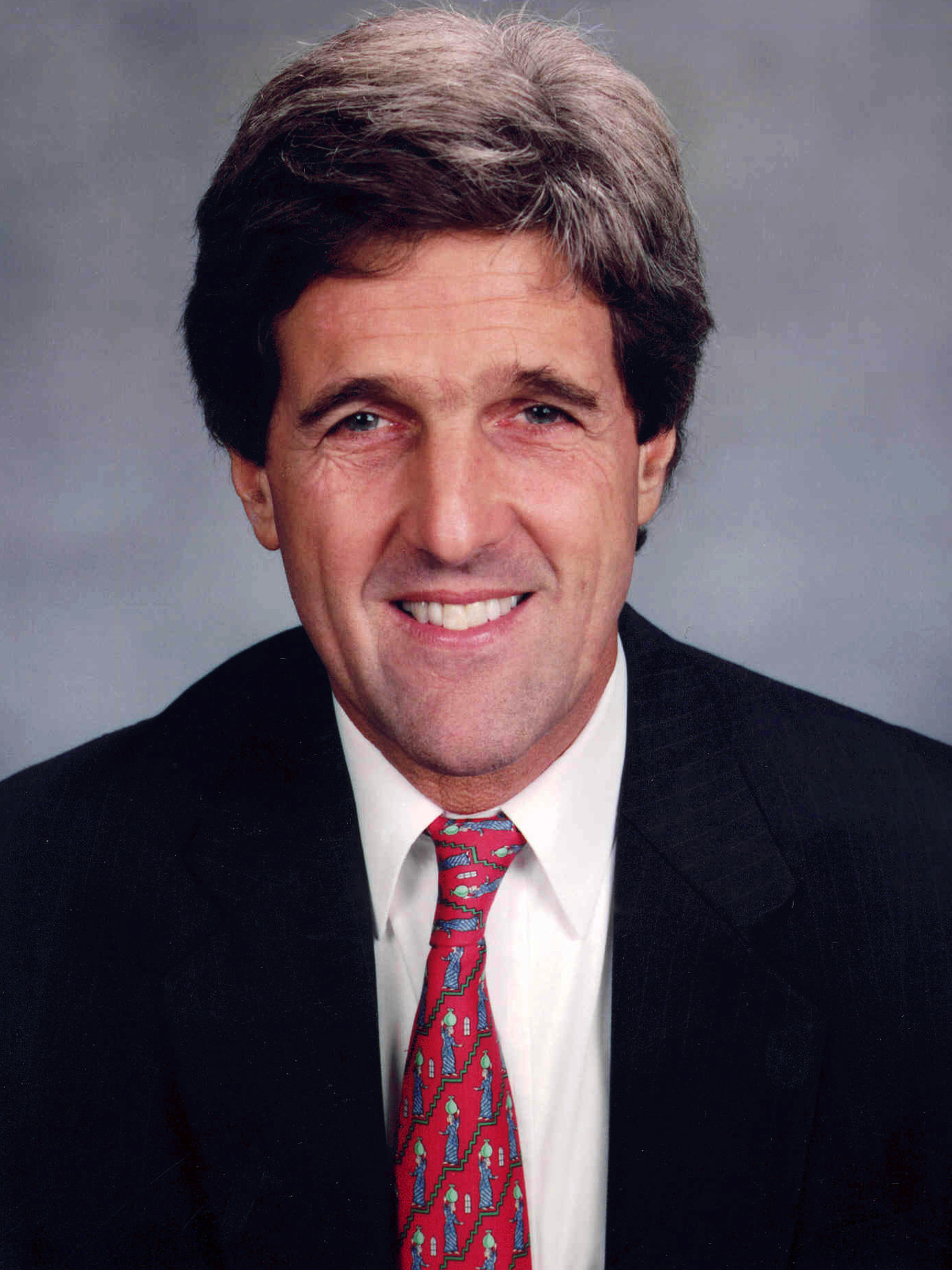

Nominee	John Kerry	Jim Rappaport
Party	Democratic	Republican
Popular vote	1,321,712	992,917
Percentage	57.06%	42.87%
- Kerry: 40–50% 50–60% 60–70% 70–80% 80–90% Rappaport: 50–60% 60–70% 70–80% Tie 40–50%
U.S. senator before election
John Kerry
Democratic
Elected U.S. Senator
John Kerry
Democratic

The 1990 United States Senate election in Massachusetts was held on November 6, 1990. Incumbent Democratic U.S. Senator John Kerry was reelected to his second term. This was the first time a Democrat was re-elected to this Senate seat.

== Republican primary ==
=== Candidates ===
- Jim Rappaport, real estate developer
- Daniel W. Daly, former Massachusetts Undersecretary of Economic Affairs

=== Results ===
Republican primary results by municipality

Massachusetts United States Senate Republican primary, 1990
Party	Candidate	Votes	%
Republican	Jim Rappaport	265,093	66.12%
Republican	Daniel W. Daly	135,647	33.38%
Write-in		202	0.05%
Total votes		400,740	100.00%

== General election ==
=== Candidates ===
- John Kerry (D), incumbent U.S. Senator
- Jim Rappaport (R), real estate developer

=== Results ===
1990 U.S. Senate election in Massachusetts
Party	Candidate	Votes	%	±%
Democratic	John Kerry (incumbent)	1,321,712	57.06%	▲2.01
Republican	Jim Rappaport	992,917	42.87%	▼2.06
Write-in		1,583	0.07%	▲0.05
Total votes		2,316,212	100.00%	
Democratic hold				

== See also ==
- 1990 United States Senate elections
