= Jim Rappaport =

James Rappaport (born 1956) is a real estate developer, entrepreneur, attorney, philanthropist and Republican politician from Massachusetts.

== Personal life ==
James Rappaport attended the Wharton School of Business and the Boston University School of Law.

== Political career ==
Rappaport initially became a real estate developer in Concord, which provided him with the means to self-finance his 1990 Senate campaign against Senator John Kerry. Although early polls indicated that Rappaport, a newcomer to the GOP, had a chance of defeating the senator, his campaign lost momentum by November, and he lost by a margin of 13%. Rappaport was then appointed Massachusetts Republican Party Chairman and served from 1992 to 1997. After being rumored as a possible candidae for Lieutenant Governor under then-Governor Jane Swift, Rappaport entered the Lieutenant Governor's race in 2002 but lost to Kerry Healey, who was hand-picked by Mitt Romney as his running mate.

== Current activities ==
Rappaport is involved in various civic and charitable organizations. He holds leadership roles within the Combined Jewish Philanthropies and is a member of the Board of Trustees for the Dana Farber Cancer Institute and the Board of Overseers of Boston's Children's Hospital. He is the co-founder and chairman of the board of Specialty Hospitals America (SHA), LLC.

== See also ==
- United States Senate election in Massachusetts, 1990

Party political offices
Preceded by Ray Shamie	Republican nominee for United States Senator from Massachusetts (Class 2); 1990	Succeeded by William Weld
Preceded by Leon Lombardi	Chairman of the Massachusetts Republican Party; 1992–1997	Succeeded by Jean Inman
