= Daniel Tyler Jr. =

American politician (1899–1967)

Daniel Tyler Jr. (February 5, 1899 – May 22, 1967) was a Massachusetts political figure who served as Chairman of the Republican State Committee from 1950 to 1953, the Massachusetts State Housing Board from 1953 to 1957, and the Massachusetts Transit Authority from 1961 to 1963. He was also a delegate to the 1952 Republican National Convention from Massachusetts and a member of the Brookline, Massachusetts Board of Selectmen.

== Early life ==
Tyler was born on February 5, 1899, in Brookline, Massachusetts, to Daniel and Ethel Ward (Rogers) Tyler. He graduated from Brookline High School in 1917 and Yale University in 1921. During World War I he was a Naval aviator and served in the United States Army Coast Artillery Corps at Fort Banks. During the Boston police strike he volunteered with the mounted unit of the Massachusetts State Guard. On December 29, 1921, he married Jean E. Kimball of Chicago. They had three daughters.

== Politics ==
=== Brookline ===
From 1922 until his death, Tyler was a Brookline town meeting member. In 1935 he challenged 25-year incumbent Walter J. Cusick for a seat on the Brookline board of selectmen, but lost by just over 100 votes. In 1938, Tyler faced Cusick again and this time won by a large margin. He remained on the board until 1953, when he was beaten by former selectman Edward Dane. He sought to return to the board in 1957, but was defeated by school committee member Thomas J. Noonan.

=== State offices ===
Tyler served as Governor Leverett Saltonstall's chief of military aides and was a member of the Republican state committee from 1944 to 1948. On June 29, 1950, he was elected chairman of the Massachusetts Republican Party. In 1952 he endorsed Dwight D. Eisenhower for the Republican nomination for President of the United States. He remained party chairman until 1953, when he was appointed chairman of the state housing board by Governor Christian Herter. He was removed as chairman in 1957 by Democratic Governor Foster Furcolo and declined to stay on as a regular member of the board. From 1961 to 1964, Tyler was chairman of the Metropolitan Transit Authority.

== Business career ==
Tyler started in the shoe manufacturing business before becoming an assistant cashier at the National Shawmut Bank of Boston. He left banking to enter the warehouse business and served as president of the Galt Block Warehouse Company of Portland, Maine.

== Death ==
Tyler died on May 22, 1967, at New England Baptist Hospital. He was buried in Walnut Hills Cemetery in Brookline.

Party political offices
Preceded by Mason Sears	Chairman of the Massachusetts Republican Party; 1950–1953	Succeeded by Elmer C. Nelson
