= Jennifer Nassour =

American attorney and political figure (born 1971)

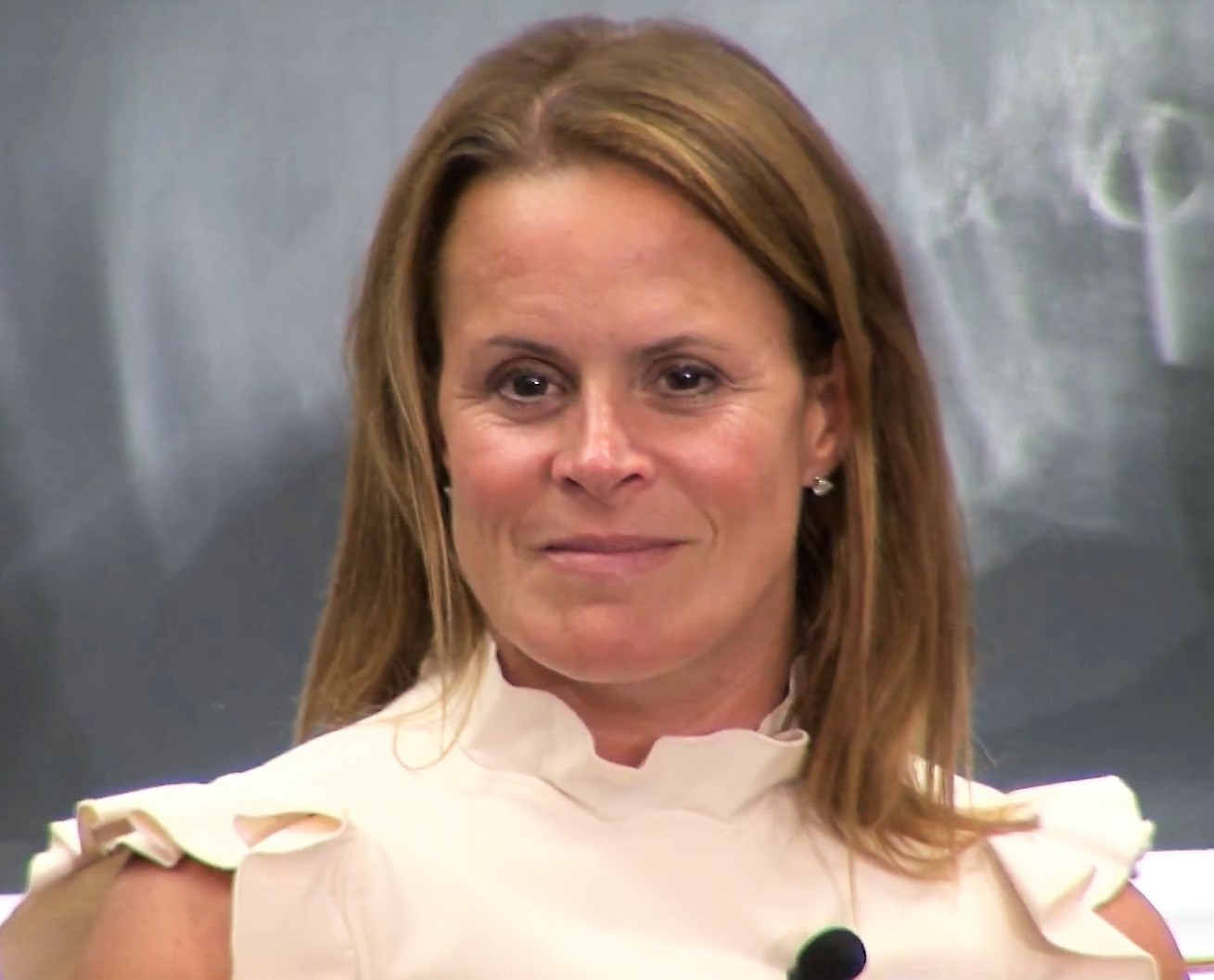
- Nassour in 2021
- Born: October 20, 1971 (age 54); Flushing, New York
- Other name: Jenn Nassour
- Education: Stony Brook University, C.W. Post University, St. John's University School of Law
- Occupations: Attorney, Women's political activist
- Known for: MassGOP chair (2009–2011)
- Political party: Republican
- Website: pocketbookproject.org

Jennifer Ann Nassour (born 1971) is an American attorney and political figure. She served as the chairwoman of the Massachusetts Republican Party from 2009 to 2011. She is also the founder of the Pocketbook Project.

== Career ==
Nassour holds a bachelor's degree in political science from the State University of New York at Stony Brook and a master's degree in political science from C.W. Post University. In 2000, she earned her juris doctor from St. John's University School of Law.

Nassour served as a legislative aide in the New York State Senate and as an aide, law clerk and chief of staff in the Nassau County Legislature. After moving to Massachusetts, she worked as a family attorney at Consigli & Brucato P.C. in Milford, Massachusetts, and served as a member of the State Republican Committee representing the Middlesex, Suffolk and Essex District. From 2001 to 2002, Nassour worked in the Massachusetts Governor's Office as director of personnel. In 2002, she was the finance director for State Treasurer candidate Daniel Grabauskas.

=== Massachusetts Republican Party chair ===
Nassour was elected chairwoman of the Massachusetts Republican Party on January 28, 2009. She defeated Joseph Manzoli and Michael Franco, receiving 49 votes to Manzoli's 15 and Franco's 2.

During her tenure, the Republicans won the 2010 United States Senate special election and gained 16 seats in the Massachusetts House of Representatives, their first net increase in 20 years. However, the Republicans were unable to win any statewide office or Congressional seat during the 2010 election. On January 6, 2011, Nassour defeated William J. McCarthy 50 votes to 16 to win a second two-year term as chairman. On September 19, 2011, she announced her resignation from the post effective October 28, 2011, citing her pregnancy with her third child.

=== Boston City Council race ===
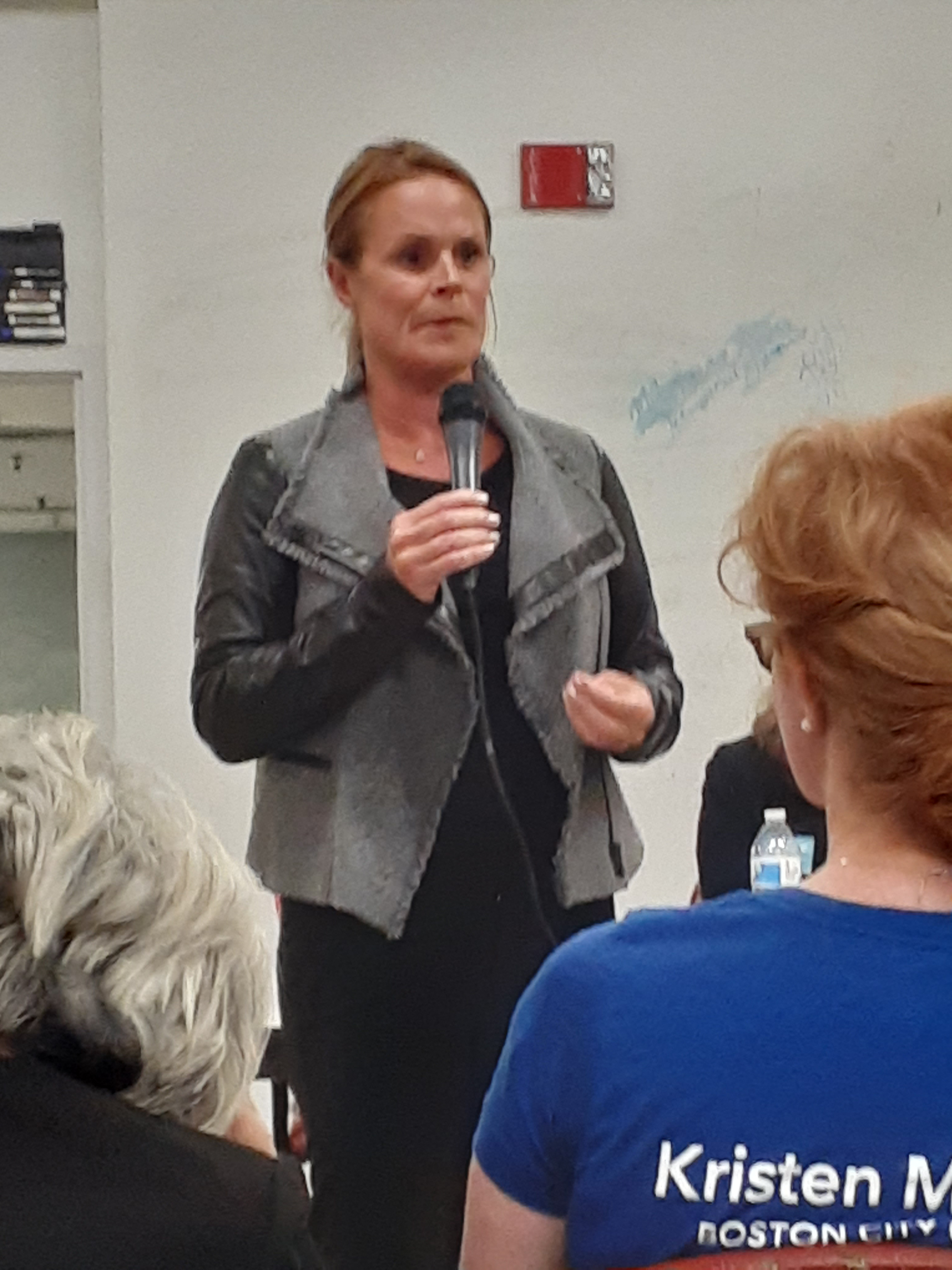
Nassour speaking in September 2019 in Mission Hill, Roxbury, Boston

In May 2019, Nassour entered the race for the District 8 seat in the 2019 Boston City Council election. Incumbent councillor Josh Zakim had announced in March 2019 that he would not seek re-election. Nassour's campaign was run by Maureen McInerney, an experienced political communicator and former MassINC Public Affairs Associate and long-time Nassour colleague. In a five-candidate field in the September 24 preliminary election, Kenzie Bok and Nassour finished first (2,032 votes) and second (740 votes), respectively, qualifying them for the general election ballot. In the November 5 general election, Bok won the seat, garnering approximately 70% of the vote.

== Political positions ==
When Nassour was running for the Boston City Council, she touted herself as being socially progressive and differing from the mainstream of the Republican Party. Nassour has supported abortion rights and same-sex marriage.

== Personal life ==
Nassour previously lived in the Charlestown neighborhood of Boston. She moved to the Back Bay neighborhood in approximately 2011, where she lives with her three daughters.

Party political offices
Preceded by Peter G. Torkildsen	Chairman of the Massachusetts Republican Party; 2009–2011	Succeeded by Robert Maginn
