= Brian Cresta =

American politician

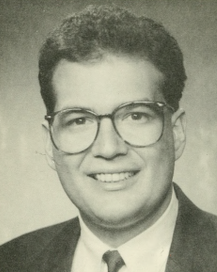

Chairman of the Massachusetts Republican Party
- In office 1998–2001
- Preceded by: Jean Inman
- Succeeded by: Kerry Healey

Member of the Massachusetts House of Representatives from the 22nd Middlesex district
- In office 1995–2001
- Preceded by: William Cass
- Succeeded by: William G. Greene, Jr.

Personal details
- Born: April 22, 1969 (age 57) Stoneham, Massachusetts
- Party: Republican
- Education: Merrimack College
- Occupation: Politician

Brian M. Cresta (born April 22, 1969 in Stoneham, Massachusetts) is an American politician who currently serves on the Middleton, Massachusetts Board of Selectmen. He previously served as a member of the Massachusetts House of Representatives from 1995 to 2001 and as a member of the Wakefield, Massachusetts Board of Selectmen from 1991 to 1994. From 1998 to 2001 he was also the Chairman of the Massachusetts Republican Party.

== Wakefield Board of Selectmen ==
Cresta was elected in 1991 to the Wakefield Board of Selectmen. At the age of 21 he became the youngest Selectman ever elected in Wakefield's history. During that time Cresta worked as a Legislative Aide to State Senator Richard Tisei.

== Massachusetts House of Representatives ==
In 1994 he was elected to the Massachusetts House of Representatives, defeating fellow Selectman Peter Melanson. The district comprised the entire towns of Wakefield and Middleton, as well as 3 of the 4 precincts in Lynnfield. In 1996 Cresta won re-election with 63% of the vote, defeating Thomas Markham, III. In 1998 and 2000 Cresta ran unopposed.

== US Department of Health and Human Services ==
In 2001 Cresta resigned from the House of Representatives to accept an appointment by President George W. Bush at the United States Department of Health and Human Services.

== Middleton Board of Selectmen ==
In 2010 Cresta was elected to the Board of Selectmen in Middleton, Massachusetts, a community he once represented during his tenure in the House of Representatives.
