= Jean Inman =

American political figure

Jean Inman is an American political figure who served as Chairman of the Massachusetts Republican Party from 1997 to 1998 and again in 2002. She also was John McCain's campaign chairwoman during his 2000 and 2008 presidential campaigns.

Inman is a resident of Avon, Massachusetts.

Inman served as the Secretary of the 2008 Republican National Convention and read the roll call vote.

In March 2013, Inman was named co-chair of State Senator Dan Winslow's bid to replace John Kerry in the U.S. Senate.

Party political offices
| Preceded by Jim Rappaport | Chairman of the Massachusetts Republican Party; 1997–1998 | Succeeded by Brian Cresta |
| Preceded by Kerry Healey | Chairman of the Massachusetts Republican Party (Interim); 2002–2003 | Succeeded by Darrell Crate |
