= Peter G. Torkildsen =

American politician

Peter Torkildsen
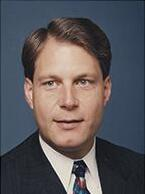

Chair of the Massachusetts Republican Party
- In office 2007–2009
- Preceded by: Darrell Crate
- Succeeded by: Jennifer Nassour

Member of the U.S. House of Representatives from Massachusetts's 6th district
- In office January 3, 1993 – January 3, 1997
- Preceded by: Nicholas Mavroules
- Succeeded by: John F. Tierney

Member of the Massachusetts House of Representatives from the 13th Essex district
- In office January 2, 1985 – January 1, 1991
- Preceded by: John E. Murphy Jr.
- Succeeded by: Sally Kerans

Personal details
- Born: Peter Gerard Torkildsen; January 28, 1958 (age 68) Milwaukee, Wisconsin, U.S.
- Party: Republican
- Spouse: Gail Torkildsen
- Education: University of Massachusetts, Amherst (BA); Harvard University (MPA)

Peter Gerard Torkildsen (born January 28, 1958) is an American former politician. He represented the 13th Essex district, including his hometown of Danvers, in the Massachusetts House of Representatives from 1985 to 1991 and represented Massachusetts's 6th congressional district, covering much of Essex County, for two terms in the U.S. House from 1993 to 1997. Torkildsen also served as chair of the Massachusetts Republican Party from 2007 to 2009.

As of 2026, Torkildsen and colleague Peter Blute are most recent Republicans to be elected to the U.S. House from Massachusetts.

== Early life and career ==
Torkildsen was born into a Roman Catholic family with ten children in Milwaukee, Wisconsin on January 28, 1958. He attended high school at St. John's Preparatory School in Danvers, Massachusetts, before obtaining his bachelor's degree from the University of Massachusetts Amherst and his MPA from the John F. Kennedy School of Government at Harvard University. Before entering politics, he was a service coordinator for the Visiting Nurse Association of Boston.

== Massachusetts State House (1985–1991) ==
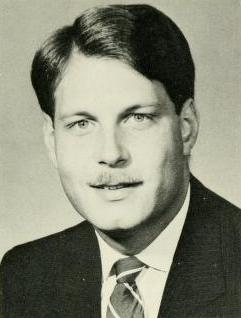
official portrait, circa 1989

Torkildsen served in the Massachusetts House of Representatives from 1985 to 1991. He had a conservative record on fiscal and social issues during his terms in the Massachusetts House and challenged State Senator Paul Cellucci for the Republican nomination for Lt. Governor of Massachusetts in 1990 as an anti-abortion candidate. From 1991 to 1992, Torkildsen was the state's Commissioner of Labor and Industries.

== U.S. House of Representatives ==
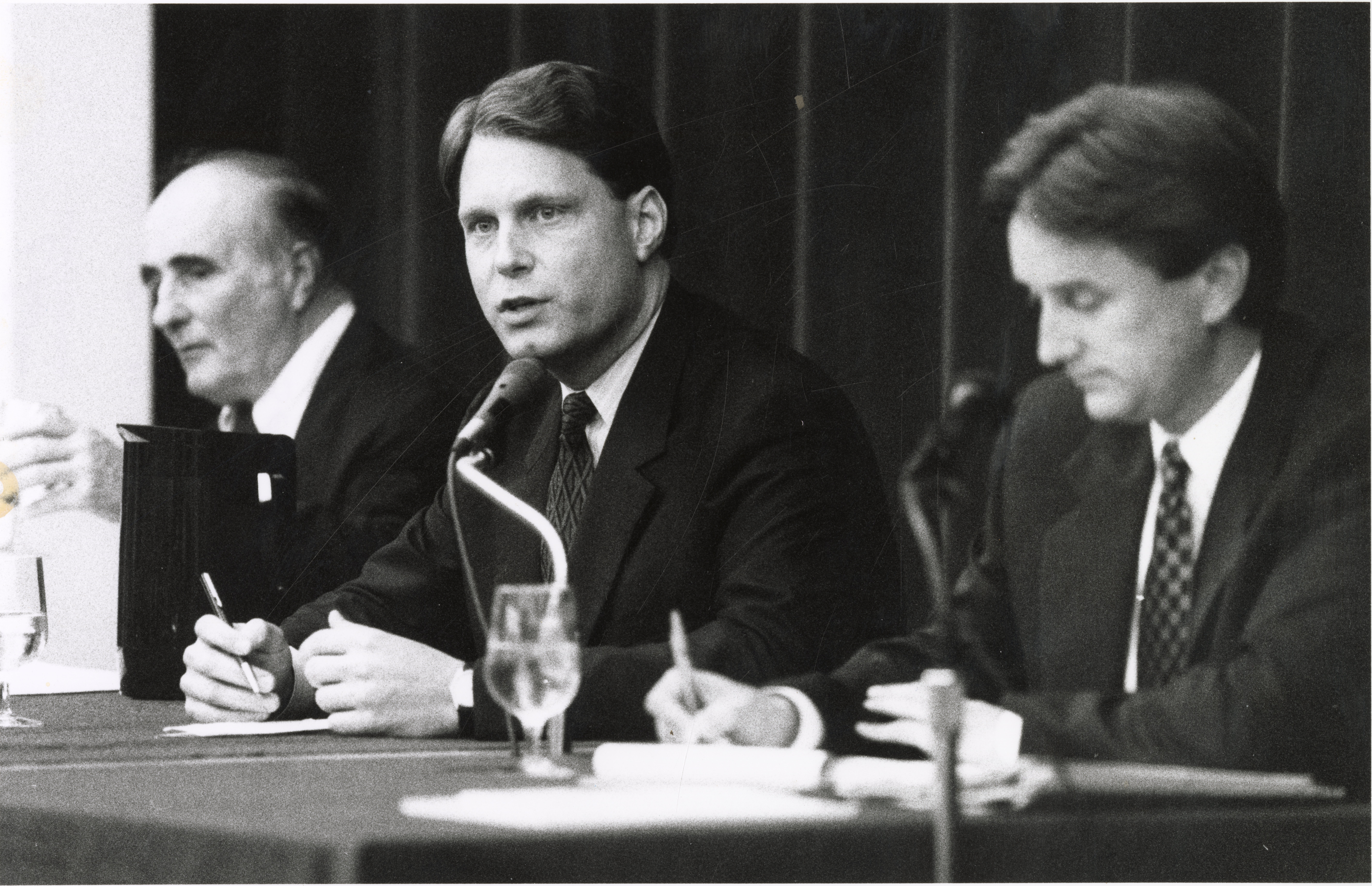
Torkildsen (center) participating in a 1994 general election debate against Democratic nominee John F. Tierney (right) and independent candidate Ben Gatchell

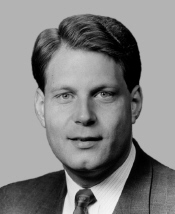
congressional portrait

First elected to Congress in 1992, he then went on to represent Massachusetts's 6th congressional district for two terms from 1993 until 1997. He supported conservative policies on defense spending and fiscal restraint, but was pro-choice on abortion, in particular voting against the 1996 Partial Birth Abortion Ban.

Crime was a primary issue in his 1994 campaign for re-election. Democratic nominee John Tierney advocated stronger gun control and criticized Torkildsen for his vote against a 1994 crime bill, while Torkildsen criticized Tierney's positions on gun control and drug legalization. Torkildsen defeated Tierney in the general election by 4 percentage points.

During his campaign for Chairman of the Massachusetts Republican Party in 2007, he claimed that he had a problem with the wording of the bill as it excluded an exception for saving the mother's life, and had he been re-elected would have supported a similar bill with the exception. He also supported the 1996 Defense of Marriage Act.

=== 1996 campaign ===
He was narrowly defeated in the presidential-year election of 1996 by Democrat John F. Tierney in a state that voted overwhelmingly for Democratic President Bill Clinton in that year's Presidential election.

Tierney was part of a net eight seat Democratic gain in the House elections that year. Torkildsen challenged Tierney to a rematch in the United States House election, 1998, but Tierney won that contest as well, 55% to 43%.

Since Torkildsen and Peter I. Blute left Congress in 1997, there have been no Republicans elected to the House of Representatives from Massachusetts.

== Post-congressional career ==
Since leaving the House, Torkildsen has returned to working in labor and workforce related areas. From 2001 to 2003, he served as a commissioner on the Massachusetts Labor Relations Commission. In 2003, he was the Director of Federal, State and Local Workforce Relations for the Massachusetts Department of Workforce Development. Since 2004, he has been the Executive Director of the Massachusetts Workforce Investment Board. Desiring to lead the repair of a Massachusetts Republican Party, Torkildsen announced in December 2006 that he would run in the January 2007 election for State Party Chairman. Torkildsen left the Massachusetts Workforce Investment Board with Gov. Deval Patrick's inauguration.

On January 17, 2007, Torkildsen defeated five opponents in his first ballot election to be chair of the Massachusetts Republican State Committee. Torkildsen received 58% of the vote. In January, 2009, Torkildsen chose not to run for re-election as Chair.

After the 2021 storming of the United States Capitol, Torkildsen was one of 23 former Republican members of Congress to call for the President Donald Trump to be impeached.

U.S. House of Representatives
Preceded by Nicholas Mavroules	Member of the U.S. House of Representatives from Massachusetts's 6th congressional district 1993–1997	Succeeded by John F. Tierney
Party political offices
Preceded by Darrell Crate	Chair of the Massachusetts Republican Party; 2007–2009	Succeeded by Jennifer Nassour
U.S. order of precedence (ceremonial)
Preceded by Peter Blute as Former U.S. Representative	Order of precedence of the United States as Former U.S. Representative	Succeeded by Richard N. Swett as Former U.S. Representative
