= Massachusetts Republican Party =

Massachusetts affiliate of the Republican Party

- Chairperson: Amy Carnevale
- Senate Leader: Bruce Tarr
- House Leader: Bradley Jones
- Founded: 1854
- Headquarters: Boston, Massachusetts
- Membership (2025): ▼423,387
- Ideology: Conservatism
- National affiliation: Republican Party
- Colors: Red
- U.S. Senate seats: 0 / 2
- U.S. House seats: 0 / 9
- Statewide executive offices: 0 / 6
- Seats in the Massachusetts Senate: 5 / 40
- Seats in the Massachusetts House of Representatives: 25 / 160

Election symbol

Website
- massgop.com

The Massachusetts Republican Party (MassGOP) is the Massachusetts branch of the U.S. Republican Party.

Originally, the party was formed in 1854. Soon after its founding, the party quickly became the dominant party in the state with Massachusetts remaining a staunchly Republican state until well into the 20th century. In fact, every single Massachusetts state and federal office was held by a party member until 1876, and it was only until 1874 that the state had any Democratic mayors again (namely William Gaston of Boston).

By the 1920s, however, the Massachusetts Republican Party was in decline. Immigrants to Massachusetts made the state increasingly Democratic, as well as the Great Depression and the New Deal. The state began producing a streak of victories for Democratic presidential candidates beginning in 1928, and by the 1950s, the Massachusetts Republican Party's strongholds were reduced to rural Western Massachusetts and Cape Cod. Since then, however, the party has still had control over the governor's office from 1991 to 2007, and 2015 to 2023.

The party currently has very weak electoral power in Massachusetts. It controls none of Massachusetts' statewide or federal elected offices, and holds just 14% of the seats in the Massachusetts General Court. As of 2024, the Massachusetts Republican Party's members in office include four members of the Massachusetts Senate, 25 members of the Massachusetts House of Representatives, and four mayors. The last time the party had nominees for all state congressional races was 1956.

In accordance with Massachusetts General Laws Chapter 52, the party is governed by a state committee which consists of one man and one woman from each of the 40 State Senate districts. The state committee elects party officers including a chair.

== History ==
=== Founding and early history (1854–1876) ===
The Massachusetts Republican Party was founded in 1854. Drawing together abolitionist and nativist anti-Catholic elements, it quickly became the dominant political force in the state and a powerful arm of the national Republican Party. Significant founding figures include Senator Charles Sumner, formerly of the Free Soil Party, and Speaker of the House Nathaniel Prentiss Banks, formerly of the American Party.

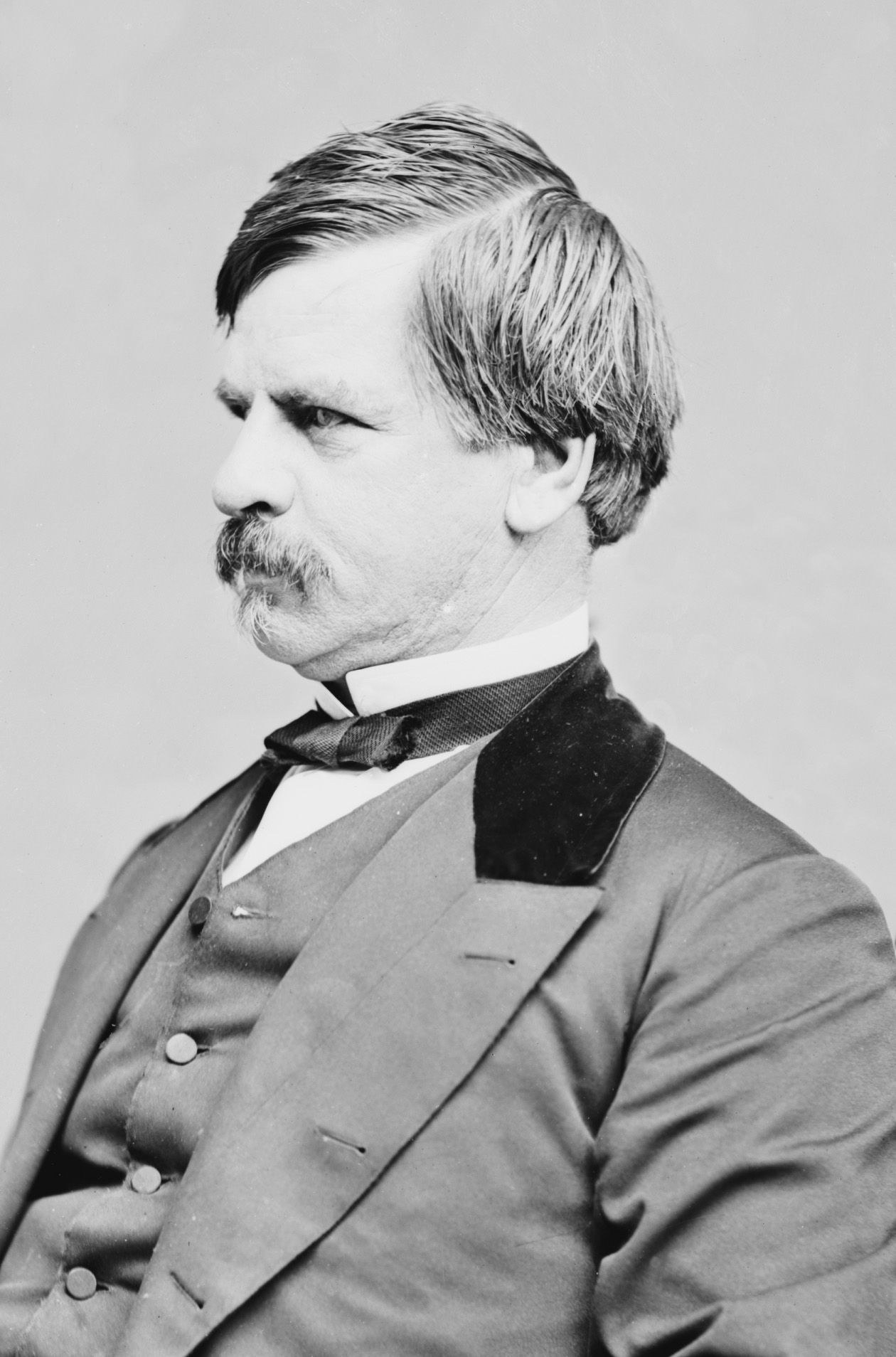
Nathaniel P. Banks, 21st Speaker of the U.S. House and 24th Governor of Massachusetts

At the time of the Republican Party's founding in 1854, all of Massachusetts's congressional representatives but Sumner were members of the nativist Know-Nothing Party. However, Banks's role as chairman of the 1856 Republican National Convention, his active support for the Republican presidential nominee John C. Frémont in 1856 and his focus on anti-slavery legislation as Speaker put him at odds with his party. Following the Democratic victory in the 1856 elections and the Dred Scott case in 1857, the national American Party organization collapsed, and most Northern members joined the nascent Republicans. In 1857, Banks ran as a Republican against incumbent Know-Nothing Governor Henry J. Gardner and won a decisive victory.

From 1856 until 1876, Massachusetts was among the most Republican states in the nation in presidential elections. During a sixteen-year period from the onset of the American Civil War in 1861 until 1876, every statewide and federal elected office in Massachusetts was held by a Republican.

While the party held a monopoly on power in the state, there were internal divisions between the radical abolitionist faction, represented by Sumner, and the moderate faction, represented by Banks. As Governor, Banks had a difficult time appeasing the more radical Sumner faction. Banks's stated opposition to the militant abolitionist John Brown and support for a state constitutional amendment requiring newly naturalized citizens to wait two years before becoming eligible to vote each drew support from the more conservative members of the party.

As national tensions over slavery grew more fraught, the state Republican Party became more radical. Banks briefly attempted to launch a presidential campaign in 1860 but failed to win support from the anti-slavery majority of the Massachusetts delegation. He chose not to attend the national convention and retired as Governor. Republicans nominated John Albion Andrew, a radical supporter of John Brown, as Banks's successor over Banks's preferred candidate, Henry L. Dawes.

At the 1861 state Republican convention in Worcester, Senator Sumner delivered a speech claiming that the Civil War's sole cause was slavery and the primary objective of the Union government was to destroy slavery. Sumner stated that the Union government had the power to invoke martial law and emancipate the slaves. This speech drew harsh criticism from the conservative Boston establishment but cheers from the party's abolitionists.

During and after the Civil War, Democrats and anti-war Republicans became increasingly unpopular in Massachusetts. Radical Republicans, who were most aggressively supportive of the war, consolidated power and passed a wave of reforms. To aid the war effort, Andrew rescinded a ban on immigrant militias. During his governorship, Republicans repealed the constitutional restriction on immigrant voting Banks had supported and passed the nation's first comprehensive integration laws.

=== Continued dominance (1876–1928) ===
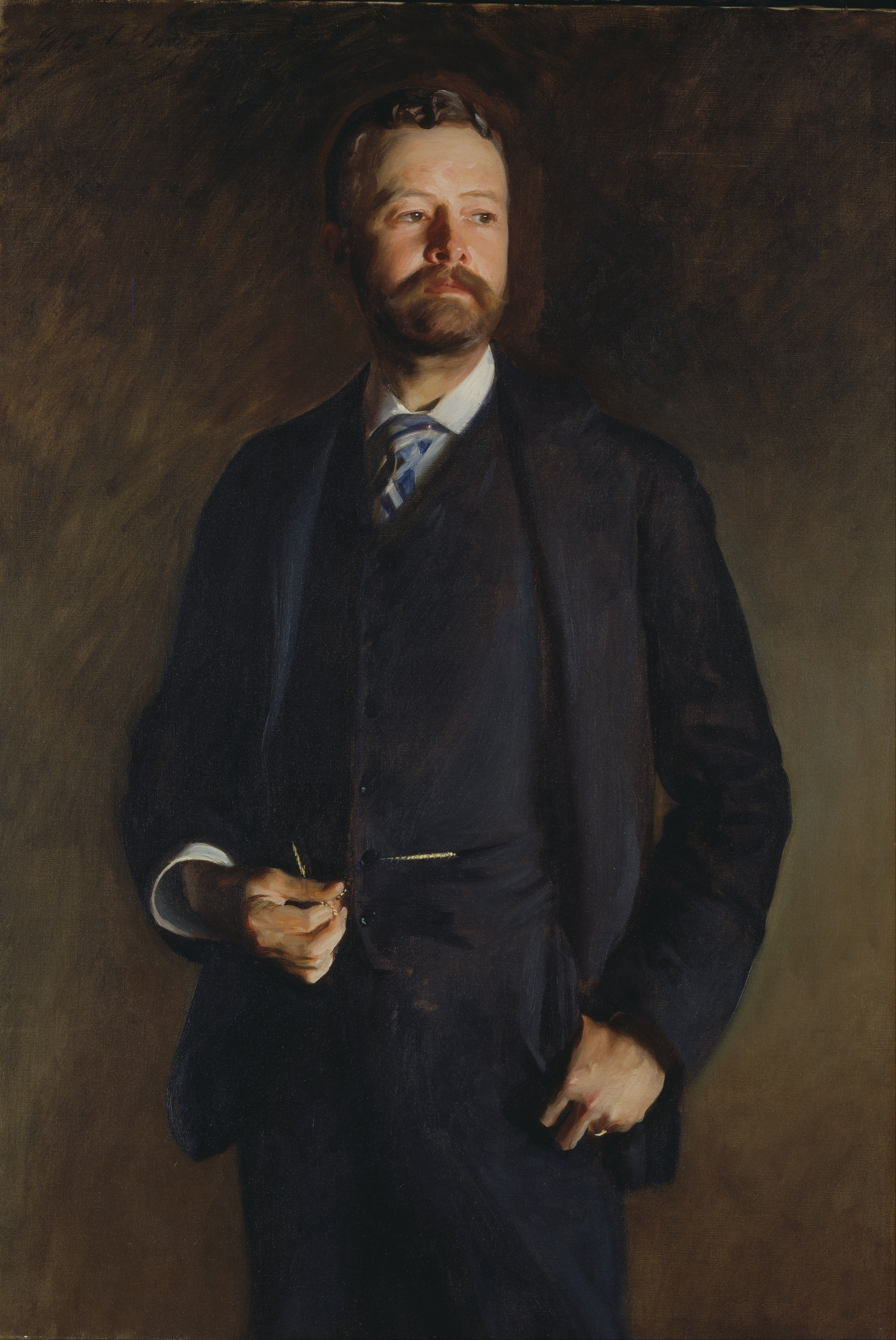
Henry Cabot Lodge

The end of Reconstruction also signaled the end of one-party rule in Massachusetts. As the national Democratic Party gained support in the urban North, Boston became competitive in statewide elections.

In 1874, Boston mayor William Gaston became the first Democratic governor since 1851. In the 1876 elections, Republicans lost six congressional seats and Rutherford Hayes became the first Republican to lose Suffolk County. Liberal Republicans Charles Francis Adams Sr. and Benjamin Franklin Butler left the party and staged competitive bids for Governor on the Democratic ticket.

However, Republicans were still the dominant force in the state through the end of the century, and Massachusetts continued to be a base for the national Republican Party. One national figure to emerge was Henry Cabot Lodge, a scion of wealthy and powerful Cabot and Lodge families. Lodge represented Massachusetts in the United States Senate for thirty years from 1893 to his death in 1924. Lodge was a prominent advocate for restrictions on immigration and an antagonist of Democratic President Woodrow Wilson on matters of foreign policy. When Republicans won control of the Senate in 1918, Lodge was named Senate Majority Leader and Chair of the Foreign Relations Committee and served in both positions until his death.

Following the death of President Harding, Vice President Calvin Coolidge became the 30th President of the United States. Coolidge was previously the Governor and Lieutenant Governor of Massachusetts.

=== Decline (1928–1952) ===
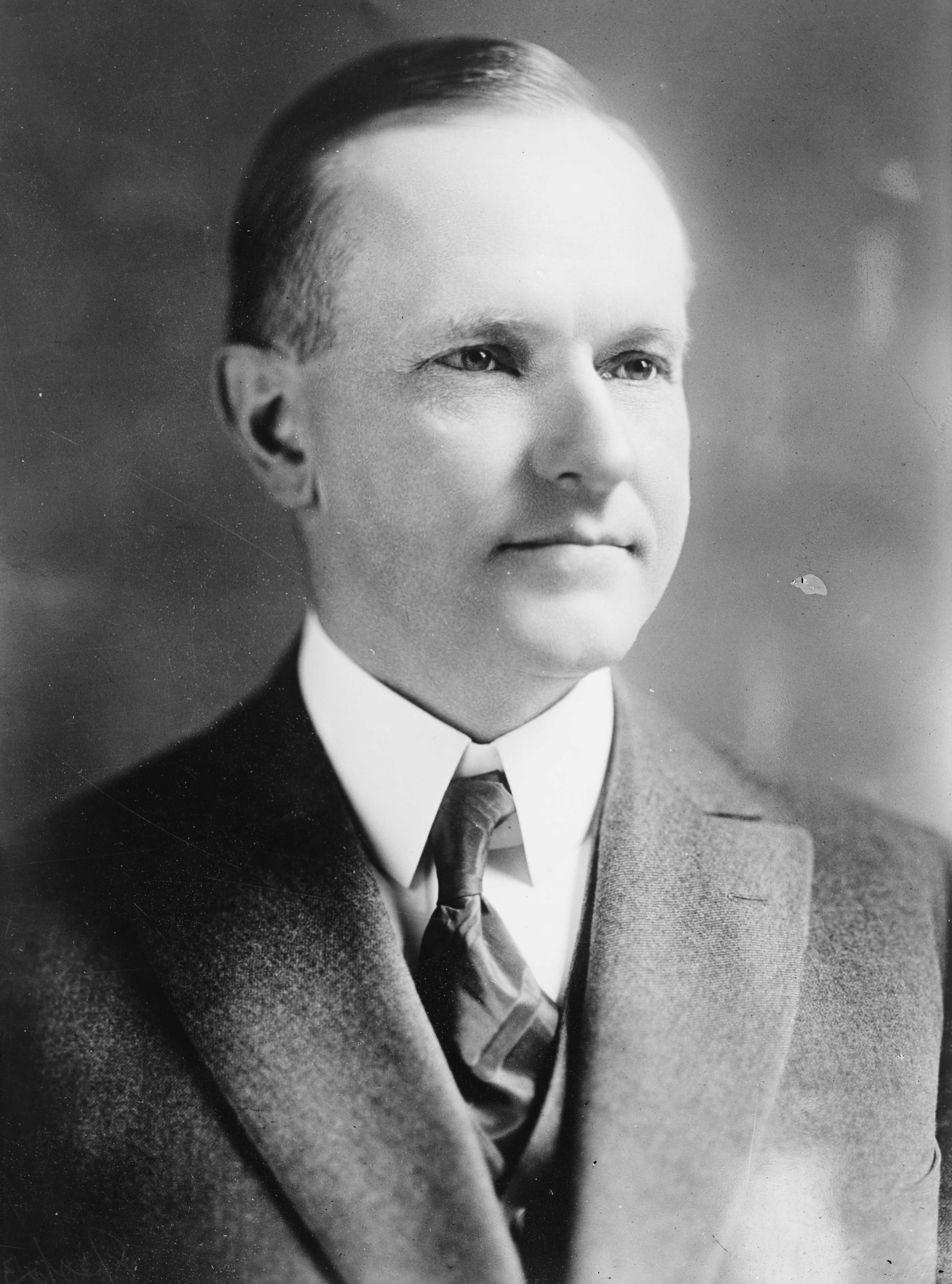
President Calvin Coolidge (1923–1929)

The Republican dominance of Massachusetts slowly died in the 1920s and 1930s as predominantly Democratic immigrant groups changed the traditionally Republican White Anglo-Saxon Protestant (WASP) Massachusetts into the Catholic Democratic majority state that it remains today. The Democratic take-over of Massachusetts was aided by the high unionization of workers in the state, coupled with the onset of the Great Depression and the rise of the New Deal Democrats. In 1928, Catholic Al Smith became the first Democrat to win a majority of the vote in Massachusetts in a presidential election since the party's foundation a century prior.

With the emergence of Franklin Roosevelt's New Deal coalition and the growing power of the urban and Catholic vote, Massachusetts produced victories for Democratic presidential candidates in every election from 1928 to 1948. By the 1950s, most of the urban and suburban areas of Massachusetts were largely Democratic, leaving just a few pockets of strongly Republican rural areas in the Cape and Islands region and Western Massachusetts.

=== Later 20th century (1950–1980) ===
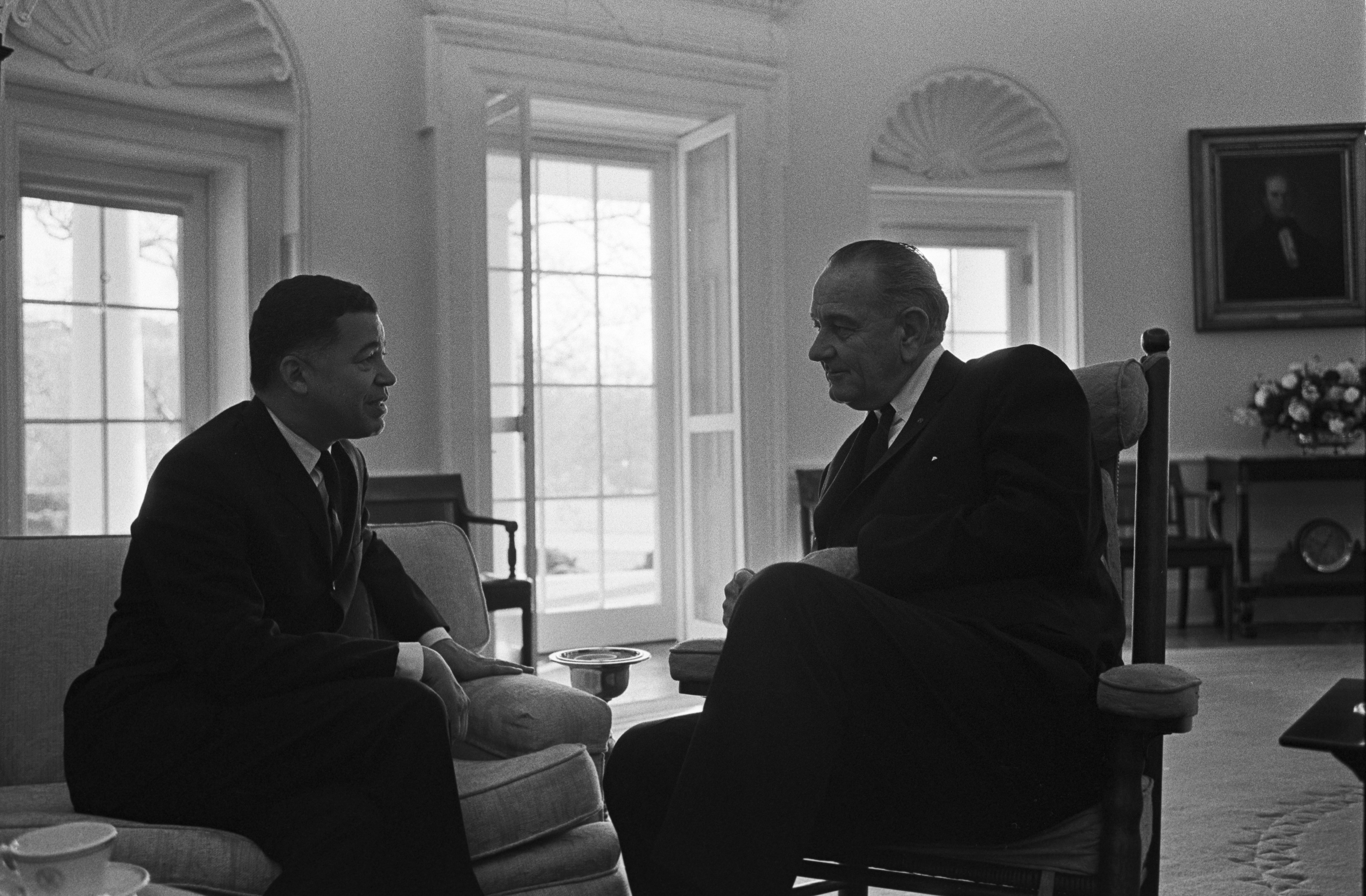
Edward Brooke, left, served in the U.S. Senate from 1967 to 1979.

Under control by the Kennedy family and John F. Kennedy in particular, the state Democratic Party gained massive popularity with suburban business interests as well as its traditional Catholic and immigrant base. Kennedy's victory over incumbent Henry Cabot Lodge Jr. in 1952 is symbolic of the long-term transition of power from Republican to Democratic in the commonwealth.

As the successful 1960 Democratic candidate for president, Kennedy won a landslide victory in Massachusetts. His brother Ted Kennedy was appointed to the vacant Senate seat in 1962 and would hold that seat until his death in 2009. Since Kennedy's victory in 1960, only one Republican presidential candidate, Ronald Reagan, has carried Massachusetts.

Liberal and moderate Republicans still experienced some success at the state level. In 1966, Edward Brooke won a landslide victory to become the first popularly-elected black United States Senator. Republicans John Volpe and Elliot Richardson also won landslide victories in the governor's race and attorney general's races, respectively. Brooke was re-elected by a large margin again in 1972.

In 1978, Republicans lost their remaining Senate seat when Paul Tsongas unseated Brooke. On the state level, Democrats would take super-majorities in both houses of the state legislature, and would dominate the governorship for 22 years out of the 34-year period from 1957 to 1990.

=== Modern era (1980–1999) ===
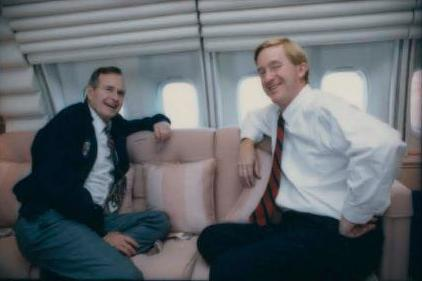
William Weld, right, was governor from 1991 to 1997.

In 1980, Republican presidential nominee Ronald Reagan carried Massachusetts, being the first Republican to do so since 1956. Massachusetts Republicans hoped his victory ushered in what appeared to be a new era for Republicans in the state.

In 1990, due to the unpopularity of then Governor Michael Dukakis at the end of his last term in office, Republicans led by gubernatorial candidate William Weld erased the Democratic super-majorities in the state legislature. However, the death of Silvio Conte in 1991 (and his succession by Democrat John Olver) also meant that for the first time, every federal elected official in Massachusetts was a Democrat.

In 1993, Peter Blute and Peter Torkildsen became the first freshman Republicans elected to Congress from Massachusetts since 1973. The hope of a Republican renaissance in Massachusetts largely dissipated in 1996, when Weld failed in his attempt to unseat Senator John Kerry and most of the Republicans gains in the State Legislature were erased. Both Torkildsen and Blute were defeated.

=== 21st century ===
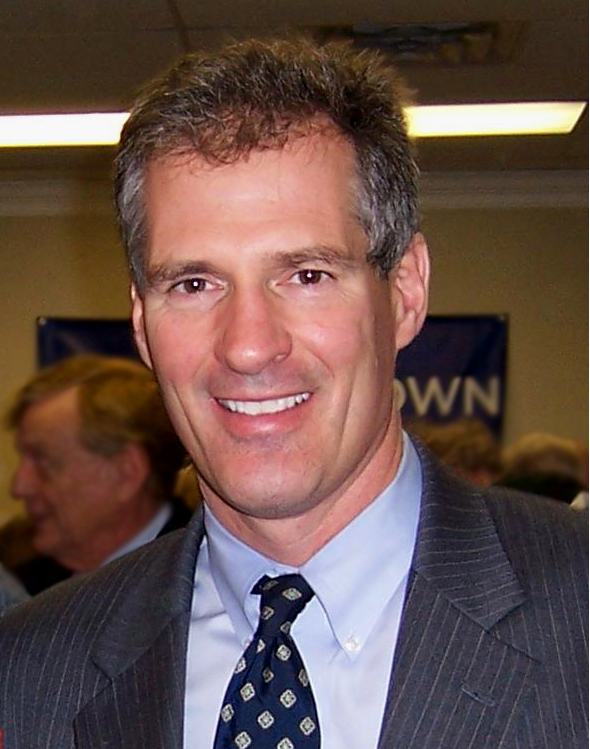
Scott Brown, the first Massachusetts Republican elected to the Senate since 1972

Despite heavy losses at all levels of government and a steady decrease in support for the national party, the Massachusetts Republican Party has been able to maintain control over the governor's office. From 1990 until 2023, the governor's office had been consistently held by a number of Republicans, only interrupted by the governorship of Deval Patrick from 2007 to 2015.

In 2010, Republicans won a shock victory when Scott Brown defeated Democratic candidate Martha Coakley in a special election to succeed Senator Ted Kennedy. Brown became the first Republican to represent Massachusetts in the Senate since 1979 and the first in Congress since 1997. However, Brown lost his bid for a full six-year term to Democratic challenger Elizabeth Warren in 2012.

In 2014, moderate Republican Charlie Baker was elected Governor, defeating Democratic nominee Martha Coakley and returning the office to Republican control after eight years. Throughout his first term, Baker consistently polled as the most popular governor in the nation. He was re-elected by a large margin in 2018. However, Republicans also lost three seats in the state legislature.

In 2020, Republicans lost three state legislative special elections.

Since 2016, much of the Massachusetts party has shifted toward the political positions and policies of Donald Trump. Shortly after the 2020 presidential election, the party endorsed Trump's false claims of election fraud, despite criticism from Governor Charlie Baker. The leadership's embrace of Trump's positions has led to infighting among moderate and pro-Trump Republicans in the post-Trump era.

In 2023, James J. Lyons Jr. lost reelection as the party's chair to Amy Carnevale by a vote of 37 to 34. Lyons sued Pat Crowley, the party's treasurer, in 2022 after Crowley froze the party's bank account as a budget was not passed by a quorum, but Carnevale dropped the lawsuit after taking office. Lyons and twenty-one members of the state committee members filed a revive the lawsuit against Crowley.

Jennifer Nassour, a former chair of the party, stated that the party was "an absolute disaster" in 2021.

In 2023, Crowley stated that the party had a net account of $35,000 with $117,000 in debt. However, Carnevale later stated that the party had $602,152 in unpaid invoices, but that a large amount was not "the responsibility of the party" such as the advertising campaign costs for Geoff Diehl's gubernatorial campaign. The party spent $55,415 on investigating Maura Healey's romantic relationships.

In the 2024 Republican Primary, Donald Trump won approximately 60% of the vote, while Nikki Haley took 37%. Former Bristol County Sheriff Tom Hodgson chaired Trump's campaign in the state, while former Party chair Jennifer Nassour led Haley's Massachusetts campaign.

The 2024 Presidential election was Trump's best showing in the state by both percentage and popular vote. In the 2024 House election, the party nominated candidates for only two of nine congressional races. The party gained one seat in the 2024 State Senate election. While the party lost seats in the State House, there was no net change in seats. U.S. Senate nominee John Deaton had the best popular vote showing of a Republican Senate candidate in over a decade.

== Current elected officials ==
=== Members of Congress ===
==== U.S. Senate ====
- None

Both of Massachusetts's U.S. Senate seats have been held by Democrats since 2013. Scott Brown was the last Republican to represent Massachusetts in the U.S. Senate. First elected in a 2010 special election, Brown lost his bid for a full term in 2012 to Elizabeth Warren who has held the seat since. Edward Brooke was the last Republican to be elected to a full term in Massachusetts. First elected in 1966, Brooke lost his bid for a third term in 1978 to Paul Tsongas.

==== U.S. House of Representatives ====
- None

Massachusetts’ U.S. House delegation has been entirely Democratic since 1997. The last Republicans to serve Massachusetts in the House of Representatives were Peter I. Blute and Peter G. Torkildsen. Both were elected in 1992 and subsequently defeated in the 1996 elections.

=== Statewide offices ===
- None

=== State legislative leaders ===
- Senate Minority Leader: Bruce E. Tarr (1st Essex and Middlesex district)
- House Minority Leader: Bradley Jones Jr. (20th Middlesex)

=== State Senate ===
- Ryan Fattman (Webster)
- Patrick O'Connor (Weymouth)
- Peter Durant (Spencer)
- Kelly Dooner (Taunton)

=== State House of Representatives ===
- Donnie Berthiaume (Spencer)
- Nicholas Boldyga (Southwick)
- Michael Chaisson (Foxboro)
- David DeCoste (Norwell)
- John Marsi (Dudley)
- Kimberly Ferguson (Holden)
- Paul Frost (Auburn)
- John Gaskey (Carver)
- Steve Howitt (Seekonk)
- Bradley Jones Jr. (North Reading)
- Hannah Kane (Shrewsbury)
- Marc Lombardo (Billerica)
- Joseph D. McKenna (Webster)
- David Muradian (Grafton)
- Norman Orrall (Lakeville)
- Kelly Pease (Westfield)
- Todd Smola (Palmer)
- Michael Soter (Bellingham)
- Alyson Sullivan (Abington)
- Kenneth Sweezey (Pembroke)
- Justin Thurber (Dighton)
- Marcus Vaughn (Wrentham)
- David Vieira (Falmouth)
- Donald Wong (Saugus)
- Steven Xiarhos (Barnstable)

=== Mayors ===
- Shaunna O'Connell (Taunton)
- Michael A. McCabe (Westfield)

== Past elected officials ==
=== U.S. senators ===
- Henry Wilson (1856–73)
- Charles Sumner (1856–74)
- George S. Boutwell (1873–77)
- William Washburn (1874–75)
- Henry L. Dawes (1875–93)
- George Frisbie Hoar (1877–1904)
- Henry Cabot Lodge (1893–1924)
- Winthrop M. Crane (1904–13)
- John W. Weeks (1913–19)
- William M. Butler (1924–26)
- Frederick H. Gillett (1925–31)
- Henry Cabot Lodge Jr.
  (1937–44, 1947–53)
- Sinclair Weeks (1944)
- Leverett Saltonstall (1944–67)
- Edward Brooke (1967–79)
- Scott Brown (2010–13)

=== U.S. representatives ===
==== 1856–1874 ====
- Nathaniel P. Banks of Waltham
  (1856–57, 1865–73, 1873–79, 1889–91)
- James Buffington of Fall River
  (1856–63, 1869–75)
- Anson Burlingame of Cambridge (1856–59)
- Calvin C. Chaffee of Springfield (1856–59)
- Linus B. Comins of Roxbury (1856–59)
- William S. Damrell of Dedham (1856–59)
- Timothy Davis of Gloucester (1856–59)
- Henry L. Dawes of North Adams (1857–75)
- Robert Bernard Hall of Plymouth (1856–59)
- Chauncey L. Knapp of Lowell (1856–59)
- Eli Thayer of Worcester (1857–59)
- Daniel W. Gooch (1858–65, 1873–75)
- Charles F. Adams Sr. of Quincy (1859–61)
- John B. Alley (1859–67)
- Charles Delano (1859–63)
- Thomas D. Eliot of New Bedford (1859–69)
- Charles R. Train of Framingham (1859–63)
- Goldsmith Bailey of Fitchburg (1861–62)
- Samuel Hooper (1861–75)
- Alexander H. Rice of Boston (1861–67)
- Amasa Walker of North Brookfield (1862–63)
- Oakes Ames of Easton (1863–73)
- John D. Baldwin (1863–69)
- George S. Boutwell of Groton (1863–69)
- William B. Washburn of Greenfield (1863–71)
- Benjamin F. Butler of Lowell (1867–75, 1877–79)
- Ginery Twichell of Brookline (1867–73)
- George Frisbie Hoar of Worcester (1869–77)
- George M. Brooks of Concord (1869–72)
- Alvah Crocker of Fitchburg (1872–74)
- Constantine C. Esty of Framingham (1872–73)
- Benjamin W. Harris of East Bridgewater (1873–83)
- Ebenezer R. Hoar of Concord (1873–75)
- William Whiting I of Boston (1873)
- John M.S. Williams (1873–75)
- Henry L. Pierce of Boston (1873–77)

==== 1875–1899 ====
- Charles A. Stevens of Ware (1875)
- Rufus S. Frost of Chelsea (1875–76)
- William W. Crapo of New Bedford (1875–83)
- William Claflin of Newton (1877–81)
- Walbridge A. Field of Boston (1877–81)
- George B. Loring (1877–81)
- Amasa Norcross (1877–83)
- William W. Rice of Worcester (1877–87)
- George D. Robinson of Springfield (1877–84)
- Selwyn Z. Bowman of Somerville (1879–81)
- William A. Russell of Lawrence (1879–85)
- John W. Candler (1881–83, 1889–91)
- Ambrose Ranney of Boston (1881–87)
- Eben F. Stone of Newburyport (1881–87)
- Robert T. Davis of Fall River (1883–89)
- John Davis Long (1883–89)
- William Whiting II of Holyoke (1883–89)
- Francis W. Rockwell (1884–91)
- Charles H. Allen of Lowell (1885–89)
- Frederick D. Ely (1885–87)
- Edward D. Hayden of Woburn (1885–89)
- William Cogswell (1887–95)
- Henry Cabot Lodge of Cambridge (1887–93)
- Frederic T. Greenhalge of Lowell (1889–91)
- Elijah A. Morse of Canton (1889–97)
- Charles S. Randall of New Bedford (1889–95)
- Joseph H. Walker (1889–99)
- Rodney Wallace of Fitchburg (1889–91)
- William F. Draper of Hopedale (1893–97)
- Louis D. Apsley (1893–97)
- Frederick H. Gillett of Springfield (1893–1925)
- William C. Lovering (1893–1903)
- Samuel W. McCall of Winchester (1893–1913)
- Ashley B. Wright of North Adams (1893–97)
- Harrison H. Atwood (1895–97)
- William Barrett of Melrose (1895–99)
- William S. Knox of Lawrence (1895–1903)
- John Simpkins (1895–98)
- William H. Moody (1895–1902)
- Samuel J. Barrows (1897–99)
- Charles F. Sprague (1897–1901)
- George W. Weymouth (1897–1901)
- George P. Lawrence (1897–1913)
- William S. Greene of Fall River (1898–1924)
- Ernest W. Roberts of Everett (1899–1917)

==== 1900–1924 ====
- Samuel L. Powers of Newton (1901–05)
- Charles Q. Tirrell of Natick (1901–10)
- Augustus P. Gardner of Hamilton (1902–17)
- Butler Ames of Lowell (1903–13)
- Rockwood Hoar of Concord (1905–06)
- John W. Weeks of Newton (1905–13)
- Charles G. Washburn of Worcester (1906–11)
- Robert O. Harris of East Bridgewater (1911–13)
- William Wilder (1911–13)
- John Jacob Rogers of Lowell (1913–25)
- Allen Treadway of Stockbridge (1913–45)
- Samuel Winslow of Worcester (1913–25)
- Calvin D. Paige of Southbridge (1913–25)
- William Henry Carter of Needham (1915–19)
- Frederick W. Dallinger of Cambridge (1915–32)
- George H. Tinkham of Boston (1915–43)
- Joseph Walsh of New Bedford (1915–22)
- Alvan T. Fuller of Malden (1917–21)
- Willfred W. Lufkin of Essex (1917–21)
- Robert Luce of Cambridge (1919–35, 1937–41)
- Louis A. Frothingham of Easton (1921–28)
- Robert S. Maloney of Medford (1921–23)
- Charles L. Underhill of Somerville (1921–33)
- A. Piatt Andrew of Gloucester (1921–36)
- Charles L. Gifford of Cotuit (1922–47)
- Robert M. Leach of Taunton (1924–25)

==== 1925–present ====
- George B. Churchill of Amherst (1925)
- Frank H. Foss of Fitchburg (1925–35)
- Joseph W. Martin Jr. of North Attleboro
  (1925–67)
- George R. Stobbs of Worcester (1925–33)
- Harry I. Thayer of Wakefield (1925–26)
- Edith Nourse Rogers of Lowell (1925–60)
- Henry L. Bowles of Springfield (1925–29)
- Richard Wigglesworth of Milton (1928–58)
- Will Kirk Kaynor of Springfield (1929)
- Pehr G. Holmes of Worcester (1931–47)
- George J. Bates of Salem (1937–49)
- Charles R. Clason of Springfield
  (1937–49)
- Angier Goodwin of Melrose (1943–55)
- Christian Herter of Boston (1943–53)
- John W. Heselton of Deerfield (1945–59)
- Donald Nicholson of Wareham (1947–59)
- William Bates of Salem (1950–69)
- Laurence Curtis of Boston (1953–63)
- Silvio O. Conte of Pittsfield (1959–91)
- Hastings Keith of Brockton (1959–73)
- F. Bradford Morse of Lowell (1961–71)
- Margaret Heckler of Wellesley (1967–83)
- Paul Cronin of Andover (1973–75)
- Peter Blute of Shrewsbury (1993–97)
- Peter Torkildsen of Danvers (1993–97)

=== Governors ===
- Nathaniel Prentice Banks (1858–61)
- John Albion Andrew (1861–66)
- Alexander H. Bullock (1866–69)
- William Claflin (1869–72)
- William B. Washburn (1872–74)
- Thomas Talbot (1874–75, 1879–80)
- Alexander H. Rice (1876–79)
- John Davis Long (1880–83)
- George D. Robinson (1884–87)
- Oliver Ames (1887–90)
- John Q. A. Brackett (1890–91)
- Frederic T. Greenhalge (1894–96)
- Roger Wolcott (1896–1900)
- Winthrop Murray Crane (1900–03)
- John L. Bates (1903–05)
- Curtis Guild Jr. (1906–09)
- Eben Sumner Draper (1909–11)
- Samuel W. McCall (1916–19)
- Calvin Coolidge (1919–21)
- Channing H. Cox (1921–25)
- Alvan T. Fuller (1925–29)
- Frank G. Allen (1929–31)
- Leverett Saltonstall (1939–45)
- Robert F. Bradford (1947–49)
- Christian Herter (1953–57)
- John A. Volpe (1961–63, 1965–69)
- Francis Sargent (1969–75)
- William Weld (1991–97)
- Paul Cellucci (1997–01)
- Jane Swift (2001–03)
- Mitt Romney (2003–07)
- Charlie Baker (2015–23)

=== State legislature ===
==== Speakers of the House ====
- Julius Rockwell (1858)
- Charles Hale (1859)
- John A. Goodwin (1860–1861)
- Alexander Bullock (1862–1865)
- James M. Stone (1866–1867)
- Harvey Jewell (1868–1871)
- John E. Sanford (1872–1875)
- John Davis Long (1876–1878)
- Levi C. Wade (1879)
- Charles J. Noyes (1880–1882)
- George A. Marden (1883–1884)
- John Q. A. Brackett (1885–1886)
- Charles J. Noyes (1887–1888)
- William Emerson Barrett (1889–1893)
- George von Lengerke Meyer (1894–1896)
- John L. Bates (1897–1899)
- James J. Myers (1900–1903)
- Louis A. Frothingham (1904–1905)
- John N. Cole (1906–1908)
- Joseph H. Walker (1909–1911)
- Grafton D. Cushing (1912–1914)
- Channing H. Cox (1915–1918)
- Joseph E. Warner (1919–1920)
- Benjamin Loring Young (1921–1924)
- John C. Hull (1925–1928)
- Leverett Saltonstall (1929–1937)
- Horace T. Cahill (1937–1938)
- Christian Herter (1939–1942)
- Rudolph King (1943–1944)
- Frederick Willis (1945–1948)
- Charles Gibbons (1953–1954)

==== Presidents of the Senate ====
- Charles A. Phelps (1858)
- William Claflin (1861)
- John H. Clifford (1862)
- Jonathan E. Field (1863–1865)
- Joseph Adams Pond (1866–1867)
- George B. Loring (1873–1876)
- John B. D. Cogswell (1877–1879)
- Robert R. Bishop (1880–1882)
- George G. Crocker (1883)
- George A. Bruce (1884)
- Albert E. Pillsbury (1885–1886)
- Halsey J. Boardman (1887–1888)
- Harris C. Hartwell (1889)
- Henry H. Sprague (1890–1891)
- Alfred S. Pinkerton (1892–1893)
- William M. Butler (1894–1895)
- George P. Lawrence (1896–1897)
- George Edwin Smith (1898–1900)
- Rufus Albertson Soule (1901–1902)
- George R. Jones (1903–1904)
- William F. Dana (1905–1906)
- William D. Chapple (1907–1908)
- Allen T. Treadway (1909–1911)
- Levi H. Greenwood (1912–1913)
- Calvin Coolidge (1914–1915)
- Henry Gordon Wells (1916–1918)
- Edwin T. McKnight (1919–1920)
- Frank G. Allen (1921–1924)
- Wellington Wells (1925–1928)
- Gaspar G. Bacon (1929–1932)
- Erland F. Fish (1933–1934)
- James G. Moran (1935–1936)
- Samuel H. Wragg (1937–1938)
- Joseph R. Cotton (1939–1940)
- Angier Goodwin (1941)
- Jarvis Hunt (1942–1944)
- Arthur W. Coolidge (1945–1946)
- Donald W. Nicholson (1947)
- Harris S. Richardson (1948; 1950)
- Richard I. Furbush (1951–1957)
- Newland H. Holmes (1957–1958)

=== Other statewide offices ===
==== Attorney General ====
- Stephen Henry Phillips (1858–61)
- Dwight Foster (1861–64)
- Chester I. Reed (1864–67)
- Charles Allen (1867–72)
- Charles R. Train (1872–79)
- George Marston (1879–83)
- Edgar J. Sherman (1883–87)
- Andrew J. Waterman (1887–91)
- Albert E. Pillsbury (1891–94)
- Hosea M. Knowlton (1894–1902)
- Herbert Parker (1902–06)
- Dana Malone (1906–11)
- James M. Swift (1911–14)
- Henry Converse Atwill (1915–19)
- Henry A. Wyman (1919–20)
- J. Weston Allen (1920–23)
- Arthur K. Reading (1927–28)
- Joseph E. Warner (1928–35)
- Robert T. Bushnell (1941–45)
- Clarence A. Barnes (1945–49)
- George Fingold (1953–58)
- Edward Brooke (1963–67)
- Elliot Richardson (1967–69)

==== Treasurer ====
- Henry Kemble Oliver (1861–66)
- Jacob H. Loud (1866–71)
- Charles Francis Adams Jr. (1871–76)
- Charles Endicott (1876–81)
- Daniel A. Gleason (1881–86)
- Alanson W. Beard (1886–89)
- George A. Marden (1889–94)
- Henry M. Phillips (1894–95)
- Edward P. Shaw (1895–1900)
- Edward S. Bradford (1900–05)
- Arthur Chapin (1905–09)
- Elmer A. Stevens (1909–14)
- Charles L. Burrill (1915–20)
- Fred J. Burrell (1920)
- James Jackson (1920–24)
- William S. Youngman (1924–28)
- John W. Haigis (1928–30)
- William E. Hurley (1937–43)
- Laurence Curtis (1947–49)
- Joe Malone (1991–99)

==== Secretary of the Commonwealth ====
- Oliver Warner (1858–76)
- Henry B. Pierce (1876–91)
- William M. Olin (1891–1911)
- Albert P. Langtry (1911–13, 1915–21)
- Frederic W. Cook (1921–49)

==== Auditor ====
- Levi Reed (1861–65)
- Julius L. Clarke (1865–66, 1876–79)
- Henry S. Briggs (1866–70)
- Charles Endicott (1871–76)
- Charles R. Ladd (1879–91)
- John W. Kimball (1892–1901)
- Henry E. Turner (1901–11)
- John E. White (1911–14)
- Alonzo B. Cook (1915–31)

== State committee officers ==
Position	Officeholder
Chairman	Amy Carnevale
National Committeeman	Brad Wyatt
National Committeewoman	Janet Fogarty
Vice Chairman	Judy Crocker
Treasurer	Mindy McKenzie
Secretary	Amanda Peterson
Assistant Treasurer	Anthony Ventresca
Assistant Secretary	Dr. Elizabeth Hinds-Ferrick

== Party chairs ==
- William Claflin
- John Z. Goodrich (1855–57)
- John B. Alley (1858–59)

- George B. Loring (1870–76)
- Alanson W. Beard (1876–78)
- Adin Thayer (1878–79)
- Eben F. Stone (1879–80)
- Charles Adams Stott (1881–83)
- Henry Cabot Lodge (1883–84)
- Edward Avery (1884–85)
- Alanson W. Beard (1885–86)
- J. Henry Gould (1886–87)
- Frederick L. Burden (1887–88)
- Joseph Burdett (1888–92)
- Eben Sumner Draper (1892–93)
- Samuel Winslow (1893–95)
- George H. Lyman (1895–96)
- Eben Sumner Draper (1896–97)
- A. H. Goetting (1897–02)
- John Davis Long (1902–03)
- Thomas Talbot (1903–07)
- George H. Doty (1907–09)
- Charles E. Hatfield (1909–14)
- Edward A. Thurston (1914–16)
- George A. Bacon (1916–19)
- Frank B. Hall (1919–21)
- Frank H. Foss (1921–24)
- Francis Prescott (1925–28)
- Amos L. Taylor (1929–33)
- Carl A. Terry (1933–34)
- George G. Tarbell (1934–35)
- Vernon W. Marr (1935–36)
- Sinclair Weeks (1936–38)
- Carroll Meins (1938)
- George W. Schryver (1938–40)
- Edward Sirois (1940–41)
- George B. Rowell (1941–46)
- Archibald R. Giroux (1946–47)
- Lloyd B. Waring (1947–49)
- Mason Sears (1949–50)
- Daniel Tyler Jr. (1950–53)
- Elmer C. Nelson (1953–56)
- Ralph H. Bonnell (1956)
- Charles Gibbons (1956–58)
- Daniel E. McLean (1958–61)
- Philip K. Allen (1961–63)
- Frederic C. Dumaine Jr. (1963–65)
- John F. Parker (1965–67)
- Josiah Spaulding (1967–69)
- Richard Treadway (1969–71)
- Herbert Waite (1971)
- Robert C. Hahn (1971–72)
- Otto Wahlrab (1972–74)
- William A. Barnstead (1974–75)
- John W. Sears (1975–76)
- Gordon M. Nelson (1976–80)
- Andrew Natsios (1980–87)
- Ray Shamie (1987–90)
- Leon Lombardi (1990–92)
- Jim Rappaport (1992–97)
- Jean Inman (1997–98)
- Brian Cresta (1998–01)
- Kerry Healey (2001–02)
- Jean Inman (Interim) (2002–03)
- Darrell Crate (2003–07)
- Peter G. Torkildsen (2007–09)
- Jennifer Nassour (2009–11)
- Jeanne Kangas (Interim) (2011)
- Robert Maginn (2011–2013)
- Kirsten Hughes (2013–2019)
- Jim Lyons (2019–2023)
- Amy Carnevale (since Jan. 2023)

== See also ==
- Massachusetts Democratic Party

== Sources ==
- Baum, Dale (1984). The Civil War Party System: The Case of Massachusetts, 1848–1876. Chapel Hill, NC: University of North Carolina Press. ISBN 978-0-8078-1588-5.
- Foner, Eric (1990). A Short History of Reconstruction. ISBN 978-0-06-096431-3. Abridged version
- Haynes, George Henry. Charles Sumner (1909) online edition
- Hollandsworth, James (1998). Pretense of Glory: The Life of General Nathaniel P. Banks. Baton Rouge, LA: Louisiana State University Press. ISBN 0-8071-2293-9.
