= Ralph H. Bonnell =

Political from American

- Born: March 5, 1899
- Died: February 6, 1975 (aged 75)
- Occupation: Businessman

Ralph Holbrook Bonnell (March 5, 1899 – February 6, 1975) was an American auto dealer and political figure who served as a member of the Republican National Committee as the Chairman of the Massachusetts Republican Party.

== Early life ==
Bonnell was born in Littleton, Massachusetts to Charles Bonnell, a factory worker, and Hettie Claflin Bonnell. Bonnell's mother was the grandniece of former Massachusetts Governor William Claflin. In 1916, Bonnell graduated from Stow High School. He then went to Boston to look for a job, where he found work delivering parcels. He later worked for a wholesale plumbing company, first as an office boy then later as a salesman. Bonnell needed a new car to do his sales work, however, a freight embargo prevented the car he ordered from being delivered. He and a group of Boston men traveled to the Ohio factory where the cars were built and drove them home. One of the men on the trip was the sales manager of the car company. He was impressed by Bonnell and offered him a job with the company, which Bonnell accepted.

== Winchester, Massachusetts ==
In 1925, Bonnell moved to Winchester, Massachusetts, where he founded an auto dealership. He was active in Winchester's civic affairs. He served on the town's Board of Selectmen, Planning Board, and School Planning Committee and was president of the Winchester Rotary Club and the Winchester Country Club. Additionally, he led the fundraising drive for the construction of Winchester Hospital.

== Massachusetts Republican Party ==
In 1950, Bonnell was named vice-chairman of the Massachusetts Republican Finance Committee. He later became chairman of the party's executive committee. In 1952 he was a member of the Electoral College, casting one of Massachusetts' votes for Dwight D. Eisenhower. On January 8, 1953, Bonnell defeated Frederick H. Deaborn 79 votes to 14 to become the Republican national committeeman for Massachusetts. In May 1956, Bonnell defeated incumbent Elmer C. Nelson to become Republican State Committee Chairman. Nelson's ouster came after Lieutenant Governor and the presumptive Republican nominee in the 1956 gubernatorial election, Sumner G. Whittier, called for his removal because of Nelson's "hostility" towards his candidacy. Bonnell became chairman on the condition that he would step down after the 1956 campaign. He resigned as chairman on Election Day, but remained state committeeman until his resignation in 1962.

== Personal life and death ==
Bonnell married Mildred Sullivan, who had been one year below him at Stow High School. They had five children.

Bonnell died on February 6, 1975, at the age of 75.

Party political offices
Preceded by Sinclair Weeks	Republican National Committeeman from Massachusetts; 1953–1962	Succeeded by Richard Treadway
Preceded by Elmer C. Nelson	Chairman of the Massachusetts Republican State Committee; 1956–1956	Succeeded by Charles Gibbons
