= Darrell Crate =

American businessman (born 1967)

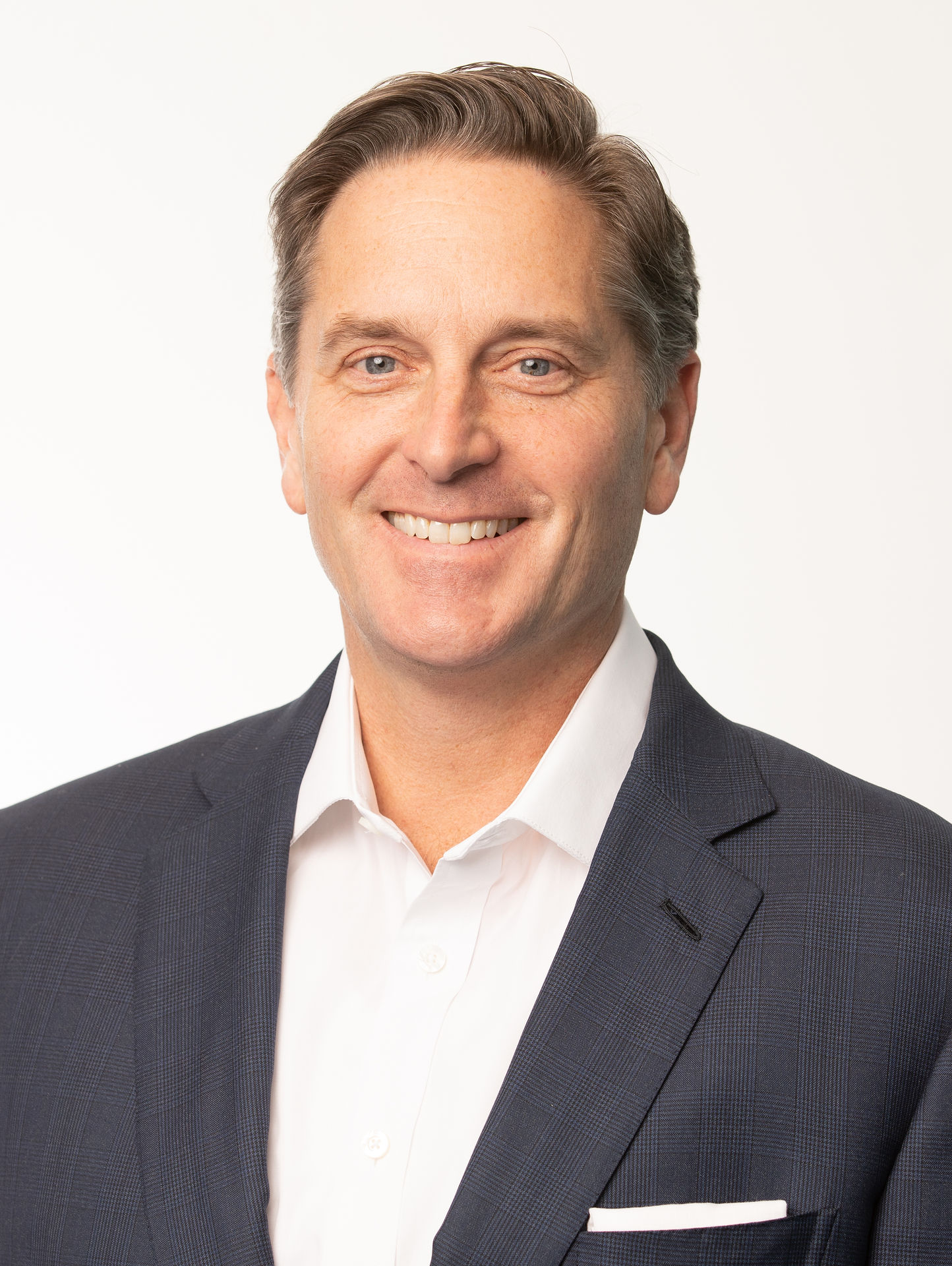
- Crate in 2023

Chair of the Massachusetts Republican Party
- In office 2003–2007
- Preceded by: Jean Inman (acting)
- Succeeded by: Peter G. Torkildsen

Personal details
- Born: 1967 (age 58–59) New York City, U.S.
- Party: Republican
- Education: Bates College (BA); Columbia University (MBA)

Darrell W. Crate (born 1967) is an American investor, private equity manager, and philanthropist. He is the CEO of Easterly Government Properties, Inc., a New York Stock Exchange-listed company that he co-founded in 2015. He is also the founder and managing principal of Easterly Asset Management, a multi-affiliate platform of high-performing boutique investment managers.

A native of New York City, Crate attended Bates College in Lewiston, Maine before attending Columbia Business School in New York City. He began his career with Chase Manhattan Bank and Chase Manhattan Securities, where he served as the managing director of Financial Institutions Group based in London. Soon after he joined Affiliated Managers Group where he helped to scale the business from 1998 to 2011 as chief financial officer.

After departing AMG, Crate served as treasurer and a member of the executive committee of the Romney for President campaign in 2012, a role that he also held during the Romney's 2008 campaign. From 2003 to 2007, Crate served as the chairman of the Massachusetts Republican Party and a senior advisor to Romney, who was the Governor of Massachusetts at the time. In 2009, Crate founded Easterly, where he has focused on several ventures, including founding a publicly traded REIT, sponsoring a SPAC, and building an asset management platform that owns stakes in boutique investment management businesses and assists them with their strategic growth.

== Early life and education ==
Crate was born in New York City in 1967. Crate received his Bachelor of Arts in economics from Bates College in 1989 and his M.B.A. from Columbia Business School in 1995.

== Investment career ==
=== Chase bank ===
Crate began his career with Chase Manhattan and Chase Manhattan Securities in New York. His last assignment as the managing director of the Financial Institutions Group based in London, focusing exclusively on investment management firms in England, Spain, France, Italy, Germany and the Benelux region.

=== Affiliated Managers Group ===
From 1998 to 2011, he served as the chief financial officer of Affiliated Managers Group, a publicly traded asset management holding company. During his tenure at AMG, assets under management grew from $50 billion to over $340 billion through mutual fund, pension, and high-net-worth accounts globally, with over half of its clients domiciled outside the United States. The firm also acquired interests in over 30 firms, including Third Avenue Management, ValueAct Capital, AQR Capital Management, BlueMountain Capital Management and Tweedy, Browne Company. Over this same period, the company’s valuation increased from $450 million to $6 billion

==== Easterly Government Properties ====
Crate is the CEO of Easterly Government Properties, Inc., a real estate investment trust traded on the New York Stock Exchange that is focused on the acquisition, development and management of Class A commercial properties leased to U.S. Government agencies serving essential functions. According to Business Wire, Crate became the chairman of Easterly Acquisition Corp., a publicly traded blank check company in July 2015.

==== Easterly Asset Management ====
Crate is the managing principal of Easterly Asset Management, a multi-affiliate platform for boutique investment managers he founded in 2019.

== Personal life ==
Crate is involved with a number of non-profit, political, and charitable organizations. He was a trustee of Bates College for nearly 20 years and served on the college's advancement and investment committees. On February 8, 2016, the college announced that Crate was among seven families to donate $19 million to endow professorships and launch the college’s new digital and computational studies program.

Crate previously served as vice chairman of the Aircraft Owners and Pilots Association. A licensed private pilot since 1993, Crate has more than 6,000 flight hours and has flown his single-engine TBM plane to all of the 48 continental states of AOPA Board Members. He also serves on the advisory council of the National Park Foundation. He has a particular focus and interest in the National Parks located in Maine, North Carolina and Montana.

Crate is a member of the advisory council of the Robert F. Kennedy Children's Action Corps (2006). In 2019, the RFK Children’s Action Corps honored Crate with its "Robert F. Kennedy Embracing the Legacy Award” for his work on behalf of at-risk youth. Crate also served as a founding board member of Think of Us, a not-for-profit technology platform that helps youth in foster care successfully transition into adulthood.

Other interests include serving as a trustee of Islesboro Island Trust (2002), Adams Memorial Foundation (2011), Ethel Walker School (2015) IRYS School of Technology and Trades (2020)and an advisor to The Trustees of Reservations (2002).

== Political involvement ==
Crate served as treasurer and a member of the executive committee of the Romney for President campaign in 2012, a role that he also held during the 2008 campaign. From 2003 to 2007, Crate served as the chairman of the Massachusetts Republican Party, and a senior advisor to Governor Mitt Romney.

Party political offices
Preceded by Jean Inman; Acting	Chair of the Massachusetts Republican Party; 2003–2007	Succeeded by Peter G. Torkildsen
