= Lloyd B. Waring =

American banker, politician

Lloyd Borden Waring (July 13, 1902 – October 30, 1997, in Rockport, Massachusetts) was an American investment banker and political figure who served as vice president of Kidder, Peabody & Co. and chairman of the Massachusetts Republican Party.

== Banking career ==
In 1921 Waring joined the firm of Kidder, Peabody & Co. as an errand boy. He dropped out of college the following year, but remained with Kidder, Peabody & Co. and later became a security trader. In 1938 he was named president of the Boston Security Traders Association.

In 1953 he was named partner at Kidder, Peabody & Co. He was later promoted to vice-president.

== Political career ==
Waring served as chairman of the Massachusetts Republican Party from 1947 to 1949. From 1953 to 1957 he was the party's finance chairman.

He was treasurer of Dwight D. Eisenhower's presidential campaigns and New England director of Barry Goldwater's presidential campaign. He also raised funds for Richard Nixon and Edward J. King.

He was a delegate to the 1952 and 1972 Republican National Conventions and an alternate delegate to the 1956 and 1960 conventions.

== Northeastern University ==
Waring was a Member of the Northeastern University Corporation from 1971 to 1989. In 1972 he was given an honorary Doctor of Political Science degree from the University.

== Personal life ==
Lloyd was married three times and had four children:

1. Bayard Waring (1929–2022), co-managing trustee of the Amelia Peabody Foundation, United States Department of Education official, and husband of BeBe Shopp
2. Deborah (Waring) Carlson
3. Faith (Waring) Roebelen
4. Philip Waring with his wife, Josée Delcroix Waring, co-founders The Waring School

Party political offices
Preceded by Archibald R. Giroux	Chairman of the Massachusetts Republican Party; 1947–1949	Succeeded by Mason Sears
