= Herbert Waite =

Herbert Roswell Waite (June 22, 1928 – July 23, 2007) was an American public relations executive, political figure, and lobbyist who served as chairman of the Massachusetts Republican State Committee from February to September 1971.

== Early life ==
Waite was born and raised in Belmont, Massachusetts, and graduated from Belmont High School. During World War II, he served with the United States Marine Corps in China. After the war he attended Harvard College and graduated with a degree in American government. In 1952 he married Mary Arroll of Swampscott, Massachusetts. Their marriage ended in divorce in 1976.

== Public relations career ==
In 1951, Waite joined New England Electric Systems as a student trainee. The following year he became a sales promotion assistant at the Narragansett Electric Company, New England Power's Rhode Island–based subsidiary. He rejoined New England Electric in 1954 as a member of their public information department. Here he served as the editor of the company's award-winning employee publication Contact. In 1960 he was promoted to director of public information. He was promoted again in 1970, this time to vice president.

== Political career ==
From 1957 to 1960, Waite served on the Wakefield, Massachusetts Board of Selectmen. In 1960 he moved to Swampscott, where he served as a town meeting member and a member of the Republican town committee. In August 1970, he moved to Wellesley, Massachusetts.

In January 1971, Governor Francis W. Sargent recommended Waite for the position of chairman of the Republican State Committee. Sargent liked Waite for the job because he was a moderate Republican who was not affiliated with either the liberal or conservative wings of the party. After two weeks of discussion between the staff of Sargent and U. S. Senator Edward Brooke, the two agreed to recommend that Waite be appointed to the position of chairman and that he would serve full-time and receive a salary of about $25,000 a year. Waite was elected to the position on February 8, 1971. On September 28, 1971, Waite submitted his resignation to the state committee, citing personal reasons.

== Lobbying ==
After his resignation, Waite returned to New England Electric as vice president for public relations and advertising. In 1973 he joined Bank of Boston as its first vice president and chief lobbyist. He retired in December 1990 after he took advantage of the company's "voluntary separation program", which offered employees with at least 10 years with the bank enhanced severance pay if they chose to retire early. After retiring he represented J. P. Morgan, Citibank, and the Bankers Roundtable before the United States Congress.

After becoming a lobbyist, Waite resided in Huddleston and Roanoke, Virginia. Waite died on July 23, 2007.

Party political offices
| Preceded by Richard Treadway | Chairman of the Massachusetts Republican State Committee; February 8, 1971-September 28, 1971 | Succeeded by Robert C. Hahn |
