= Elmer C. Nelson =

American politician

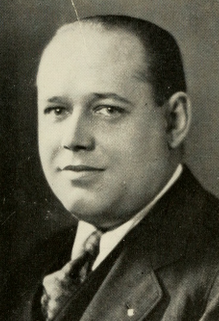

Chairman of the Massachusetts Republican Party
- In office 1953–1956
- Preceded by: Daniel Tyler Jr.
- Succeeded by: Ralph H. Bonnell

Member of the Massachusetts House of Representatives from the 8th Worcester district
- In office 1933–1937
- Preceded by: Lester Libbey
- Succeeded by: Nathan Rosenfeld

Personal details
- Born: June 1, 1900 Woonsocket, Rhode Island, U.S.
- Died: March 31, 1975 (aged 74) Milford, Massachusetts, U.S.
- Resting place: Pine Grove Cemetery; Milford, Massachusetts
- Party: Republican
- Occupation: Car dealer

Elmer Carl Nelson (June 1, 1900 – March 31, 1975) was an American political figure who served as the chairman of the Massachusetts Republican State Committee from 1953 to 1956, a delegate to the 1956 Republican National Convention from Massachusetts, and the Republican nominee for Lieutenant Governor of Massachusetts in 1958. He was a resident of Mendon, Massachusetts.

== Early life ==
Nelson was born on June 1, 1900, in Woonsocket, Rhode Island. He graduated from Milford High School in Milford, Massachusetts. During his senior year he enlisted in the United States Army. He served in the 26th Division, 101st Engineer Battalion during World War I. In 1929 he opened a Buick dealership in Milford.

== Political career ==
Nelson represented the 8th Worcester District in the Massachusetts House of Representatives from 1933 to 1937. He served as vice chairman of the Special Commission on Taxation. He managed Leverett Saltonstall's successful 1938 gubernatorial campaign. He then served as volunteer aide to Saltonstall and was seen as the Governor's patronage chief. From 1939 to 1942, Nelson was a state racing commissioner. During World War II he was a captain in the United States Army.

Nelson managed Christian Herter's 1952 gubernatorial campaign and in 1953, with Herter's support, was elected chairman of the Massachusetts Republican Party. He was given a $12,000-a-year salary, becoming the party's first paid chairman. In 1956, the party's presumptive gubernatorial nominee, Sumner G. Whittier demanded Nelson's resignation, which he refused. He was defeated for reelection by Ralph H. Bonnell at that year's party convention. In 1958, Nelson was the Republican nominee for Lieutenant Governor. He lost to Democrat Robert F. Murphy 60% to 39%. Nelson led his third successful gubernatorial campaign when he managed John Volpe's 1964 campaign.

== Death ==
Nelson died on March 31, 1975, at Milford Hospital.

== See also ==
- 1933–1934 Massachusetts legislature
- 1935–1936 Massachusetts legislature

Party political offices
Preceded by Daniel Tyler Jr.	Chairman of the Massachusetts Republican State Committee; 1953–1956	Succeeded by Ralph H. Bonnell
Preceded by Charles Gibbons	Republican nominee for Lieutenant Governor of Massachusetts; 1958	Succeeded by Augustus Gardner Means
