= Josiah Spaulding =

American lawyer (1922–1983)

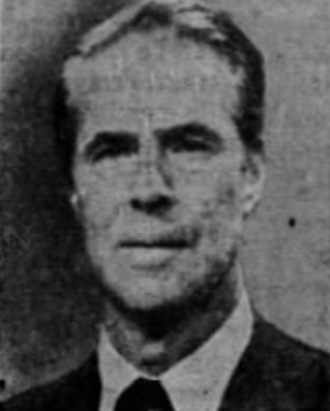

Chairman of the Massachusetts Republican Party
- In office 1967–1969
- Preceded by: John F. Parker
- Succeeded by: Richard Treadway

Personal details
- Born: December 21, 1922
- Died: March 27, 1983 (aged 60) San Juan, Puerto Rico

Josiah Augustus "Si" Spaulding (December 21, 1922 – March 27, 1983) was an American businessman, attorney, and politician.

== Education and military service ==
Spaulding graduated from the Hotchkiss School and Yale University in 1947, where he was a member of Skull and Bones. He served three years as a pilot for the US Marine Corps during World War II and was discharged as a first lieutenant. He attended Columbia Law School.

== Politics ==
Spaulding served as the chairman of the Massachusetts Republican Party from 1967 to 1969. He was the Republican nominee for United States Senator in 1970 and Massachusetts Attorney General in 1974. Spaulding was elected to Common Cause's National Governing Board in 1973.

== Law ==
Spaudling was a partner in the Boston law firm of Bingham Dana & Gould.

== Business ==
Spaulding was the longtime chairman of Beverly Hospital in Beverly, Massachusetts.

Spaulding was one of the founders of the Massachusetts Rehabilitation Hospital. Following his death, the hospital would be renamed the Spaulding Rehabilitation Hospital in his honor.

== Personal life ==
Spaulding was married to Helen Bowdoin Spaulding, an activist and philanthropist who served as the president of the New England Aquarium and vice chairman of the board of trustees of Georgetown University.

He died of a heart attack in 1983 in San Juan, Puerto Rico.

Spaulding's son, Josiah Spaulding Jr., is the president and CEO of the Citi Performing Arts Center.

Party political offices
Preceded by John F. Parker	Chairman of the Massachusetts Republican Party; 1967-1969	Succeeded by Richard Treadway
Preceded by Howard J. Whitmore Jr.	Republican nominee for United States Senator from Massachusetts; 1970	Succeeded by Michael S. Robertson
Preceded by Donald L. Conn	Republican nominee for Attorney General of Massachusetts; 1974	Succeeded by Bill Weld
