= Richard Treadway =

American politician

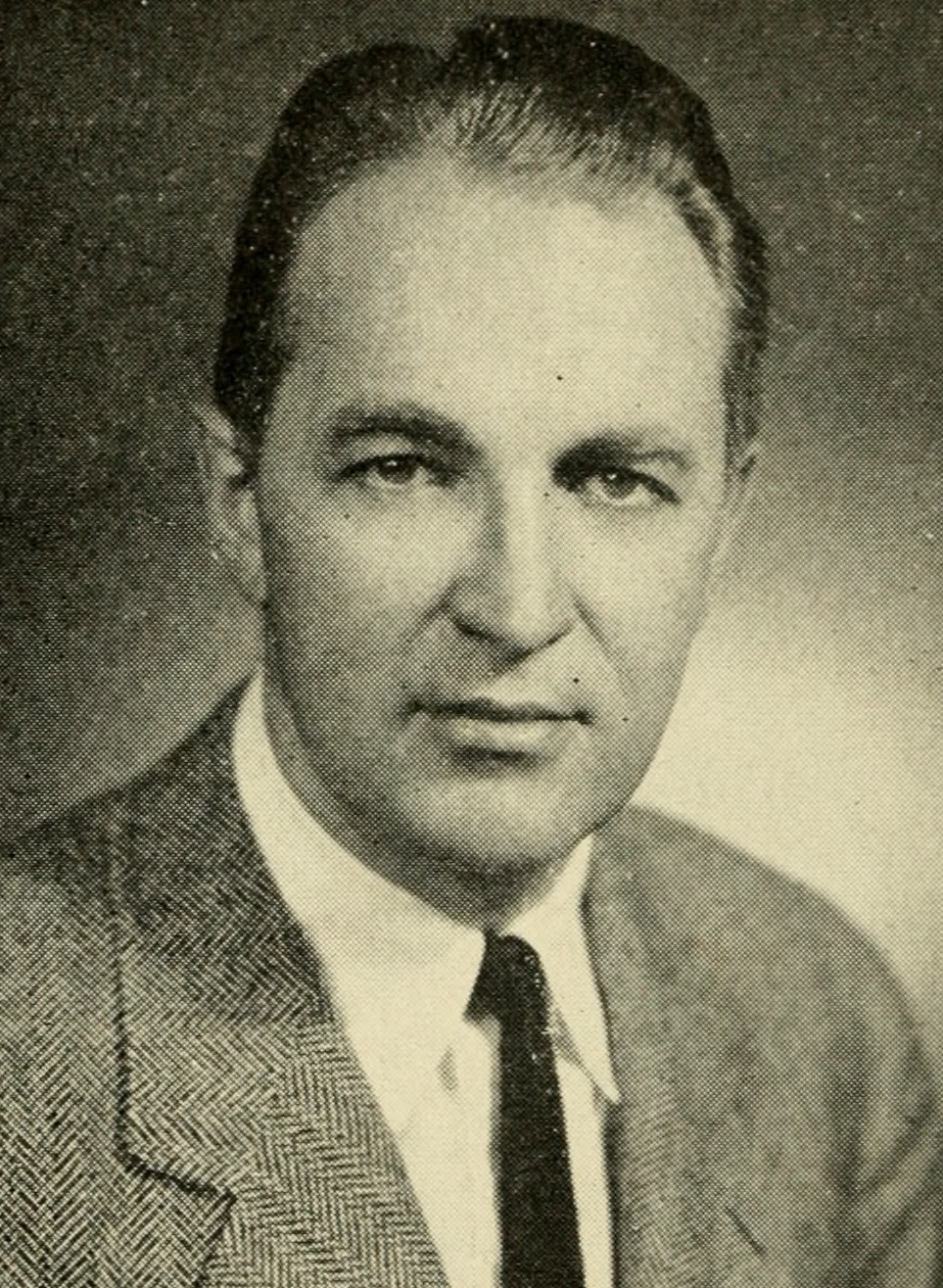
- Portrait of senator Richard Treadway in the Massachusetts General Court

Member of the Massachusetts Senate from the Worcester and Hampden District
- In office 1953–1955
- Preceded by: Edward Staves
- Succeeded by: Paul H. Benoit

Personal details
- Born: June 5, 1913 Williamstown, Massachusetts, US
- Died: March 26, 2006 (aged 92) Vero Beach, Florida, US
- Party: Republican
- Education: Dartmouth College
- Occupation: Hotel Manager; Politician

Richard Fowle Treadway (born June 5, 1913, in Williamstown, Massachusetts, died March 26, 2006, in Vero Beach, Florida) was an American businessman and politician who served as President of Treadway Inns Corp., was a member of the Massachusetts Senate from 1953 to 1955, and served as Chairman of the Massachusetts Republican State Committee from 1969 to 1971.

== Early life ==
Treadway was born and raised in Williamstown, Massachusetts. He graduated from Williston Academy in 1932 and from Dartmouth College in 1936 with a bachelor's degree in English. While at Dartmouth, Treadway was also the business editor of The Dartmouth and was a member of the Palaeopitus.

== Business ==
After graduating from Dartmouth, Treadway served as the manager of the Glenburnie Inn in East Lake George, New York. In 1937 he became the co-owner and assistant manager of the Royal Park Inn in Vero Beach, Florida. After two years in Vero Beach, Treadway sold his shares in the inn to his father and left the hotel business to become an instructor at St. Lawrence University. In 1941, Treadway left SLU to manage the cafeteria of the Fellows Gear Shaper Company in Springfield, Vermont. Treadway later served in the United States Marine Corps for two years during World War II. He was stationed at Marine Corps Base Camp Lejeune, where he managed the camp's mess halls. After the War, Treadway was the owner and manager of the Publick House in Sturbridge, Massachusetts. In 1949 he succeeded his father as President of Treadway Inns. He remained the President of Treadway Inns until 1964, when he engineered the sale of the company to its employees.

After the sale of Treadway Inns, Treadway worked for the Boit, Dalton & Church Inc. insurance brokerage company in Boston. He later returned to Treadway Inns as a consultant during the late 1980s.

== Politics ==
Treadway's interest in politics began after he met Dwight D. Eisenhower. At the time, Eisenhower was President of Columbia University and Treadway was asked to do a feasibility study of a potential University property. In 1952, Treadway worked as a volunteer for Citizens for Eisenhower and attended the 1952 Republican National Convention.

After the Convention, Treadway was asked to run for the Massachusetts Senate seat in the Worcester and Hampden District. He served one term in the Senate, but did not seek re-election due to his family and business obligations. Following his departure from the Senate, Treadway stayed active in the Republican Party as the President of the Middlesex Republican Club and the Republican Club of Massachusetts. In 1958 he served as the chairman of the executive committee that chose the Republican nominee for Governor following the death of Presumptive nominee George Fingold.

Treadway served as a member of the Republican National Committee from 1962 to 1964. He was part of a group of Republicans that sought to prevent Barry Goldwater from winning the 1962 Presidential nomination.

In 1969, Treadway was elected Chairman of the Massachusetts Republican State Committee. He chose not to run for reappointment in 1971 and later became a regional director of the United States Department of Commerce.

== Personal life ==
Treadway was married three times. His first marriage was to Martha Chamberlin of Hanover, New Hampshire. The marriage lasted from 1937 until her death in 1966. His second marriage to Suzanne Clery Herter, the ex-wife of Christian A. Herter, Jr., ended in an amicable divorce. His third marriage to Peggy Simmons, the daughter of Huntington Hardwick and the granddaughter of financier and philanthropist Galen Stone, lasted from 1982 until her death in 2005.

Treadway was the father of three sons, David, Jonathan, and James, and one daughter, Lauris London. he died in Vero Beach Florida in 2006 age 92

== See also ==
- 1953–1954 Massachusetts legislature

Party political offices
Preceded by Ralph H. Bonnell	Republican National Committeeman from Massachusetts; 1962-1964	Succeeded by Bruce Crane
Preceded by Josiah Spaulding	Chairman of the Massachusetts Republican State Committee; 1969-1971	Succeeded by Herbert Waite
