= Kershaw =

Surname list

- Pronunciation: UK: /ˈkərʃɔː/ UK: /ˈkərʃɑː/
- Language: English

Origin
- Language: Middle English
- Origin: Kyrkeshagh
- Derivation: kirk + shaw
- Meaning: 'church grove'

Other names
- Variant forms: Kirkshaw, Kirshaw

Kershaw is an English-language surname deriving from a topographical identifier in the northern dialect of Middle English: kirk meaning 'church' and shaw meaning 'grove'. Places named Kirkshaw include Kirkshaw in the parish of Rochdale, Greater Manchester, and two hamlets in West Yorkshire. The Kershaw (anciently spelled Kyrkeshagh) family resided at Town House, Rochdale from the Middle Ages until the early modern period.

Notable people with the name include:

- Abbey Lee Kershaw (born 1987), Australian fashion model
- Alex Kershaw (born 1966), American historian
- Andy Kershaw (1959–2026), British radio DJ
- Anthony Kershaw (1915–2008), British Conservative Party Member of Parliament 1955 to 1987
- Arnold Peter Kershaw, Australian palynologist who did key work on dating Gunditjmara aquaculture
- Betty Kershaw (born 1943), British professor of nursing
- Billy Kershaw, English rugby league footballer who played in the 2000s
- Bob Kershaw (died 1998), South African fighter pilot in World War II
- Cecil Kershaw (1895–1972), British fencer and rugby union footballer during the 1920s
- Clayton Kershaw (born 1988), American baseball player
- Devon Kershaw (born 1982), Canadian cross-country skier
- Doug Kershaw (born 1936), American fiddle player
- Elinor Kershaw (1884–1971), American actress
- Fraser Kershaw, activist and actor
- Harriette Kershaw Leiding (1874–1948), American writer, clubwoman
- Harry Kershaw, rugby league footballer who played in the 1890s and 1900s
- Harry Clement Kershaw (1906–1985), British trade unionist
- Herbert Kershaw (1885–1955), English rugby union and rugby league footballer who played in the 1900s and 1910s
- H. V. Kershaw (1918–1992), British dramatist
- Ian Kershaw (born 1943), British historian
- J.C. Kershaw (1871–1959), British entomologist
- Jack Kershaw (1913–2010), American attorney
- John Kershaw (disambiguation), several people
- Joseph B. Kershaw (1822–1894), Confederate general
- Joseph Franklin Kershaw (1884–1917), English artist
- Kenneth A. Kershaw (1930–2019), British-Canadian botanist and lichenologist
- Kim Kershaw (born 1959), Australian rules footballer, father of Abbey Lee Kershaw
- L. R. Kershaw (1880–1969), pioneer Oklahoma settler, developer, banker and cattleman
- Les Kershaw, chief scout and academy director for Manchester United
- Liz Kershaw (born 1958), UK music broadcaster
- Mary Kershaw, US museum director
- May Kershaw, UK musician
- Nellie Kershaw (1891–1924), UK textile worker and the first asbestos victim
- Nik Kershaw (born 1958), UK singer-songwriter
- Noreen Kershaw (born 1950), UK actor
- Paul Dudley Kershaw (1926–2006), American singer and musician, cousin to Doug and Sammy Kershaw
- Peter Kershaw, British tennis player and chairman at Joseph Holt's Brewery
- Richard Kershaw (1934–2014), UK television reporter
- Sammy Kershaw (born 1958), singer and songwriter, a relative of the Cajun fiddler, Doug Kershaw
- Thomas Kershaw (disambiguation), several people
- Willette Kershaw (1882–1960), American actress

== See also ==
- Baron Kershaw
