= List of Victory ships (K) =

This is a list of Victory ships with names beginning with K.

== Description ==
A Victory ship was a cargo ship. The cargo ships were 455 feet 3 inches (138.76 m) overall, 436 feet 6 inches (133.05 m) between perpendiculars They had a beam of 62 feet 0 inches (18.90 m), a depth of 38 feet 0 inches (11.58 m) and a draught of 28 feet 0 inches (8.53 m). They were assessed at 7,612 GRT, 4,555 NRT and 10,750 DWT.

The ships were powered by a triple expansion steam engine, driving a steam turbine via double reduction gear. This gave the ship a speed of 15.5 knots (28.7 km/h) or 16.5 knots (30.6 km/h), depending on the machinery installed.

Liberty ships had five holds. No. 1 hold was 57 feet 6 inches (17.53 m) long, with a capacity of 81,715 cubic feet (2,313.9 m^{3}), No. 2 hold was 45 feet 0 inches (13.72 m) long, with a capacity of 89,370 cubic feet (2,531 m^{3}), No. 3 hold was 78 feet 0 inches (23.77 m) long, with a capacity of 158,000 cubic feet (4,500 m^{3}), No. 4 hold was 81 feet 0 inches (24.69 m) long, with a capacity of 89,370 cubic feet (2,531 m^{3}) and No. 5 hold was 75 feet 0 inches (22.86 m) long, with a capacity of 81,575 cubic feet (2,309.9 m^{3}).

In wartime service, they carried a crew of 62, plus 28 gunners. The ships carried four lifeboats. Two were powered, with a capacity of 27 people and two were unpowered, with a capacity of 29 people.

== Karnes ==
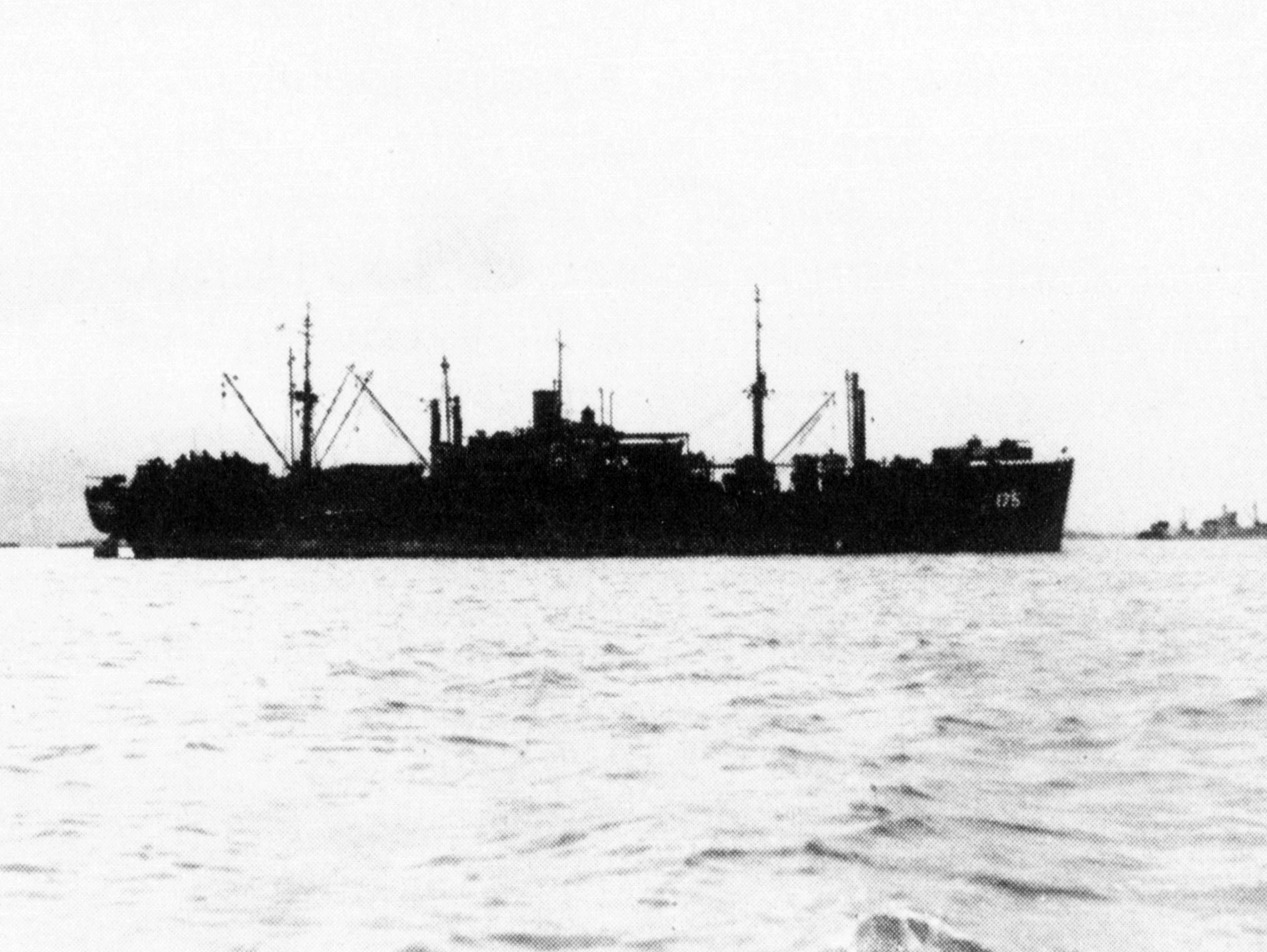
USS Karnes

Karnes was built by Oregon Shipbuilding Corporation, Portland, Oregon. Her keel was laid on 24 September 1944. She was launched on 7 November and delivered on 3 December. Built for the United States Navy. To the United States Maritime Commission (USMC) in 1946 and laid up in the James River. She was scrapped at Castellón de la Plana, Spain in 1974.

== Kelso Victory ==
Kelso Victory was built by Oregon Shipbuilding Corporation. Her keel was laid on 27 November 1944. She was launched on 30 December and delivered on 16 February 1945. Built for the War Shipping Administration (WSA), she was operated under the management of Isthmian Steamship Company. Laid up in Suisun Bay in 1948. Sold to Pacific Far East Line, San Francisco, California in 1951 and renamed Hawaii Bear. Sold in 1961 to Caper Trading Co., Wilmington, Delaware and renamed Smith Caper. Renamed U.S. Caper in 1965. Sold in 1967 to AEC Shipping Corp., Wilmington, Delaware. Sold in 1969 to Transpacific Container Services, Monrovia, Liberia and renamed Oriental Despatcher. Converted to a container ship in October 1969 by Hong Kong & Whampoa Drydock Co., Hong Kong. Now 7,424 GRT. Sold in 1972 to Universal Enterprise Inc., Liberia and renamed Oriental Falcon. She was scrapped at Kaohsiung, Taiwan in 1976.

== Kenton ==
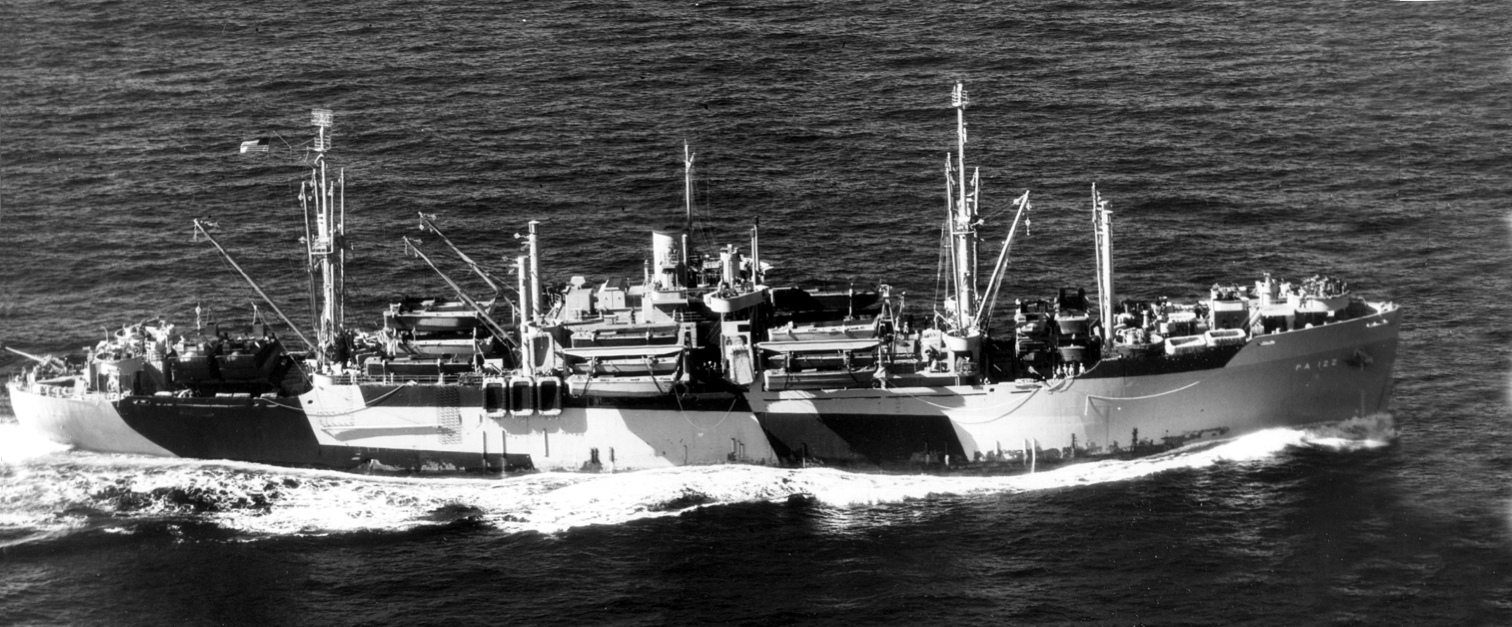
USS Kenton

Kenton was built by California Shipbuilding Corporation, Terminal Island, Los Angeles, California. Her keel was laid on 26 June 1944. She was launched on 1 September and delivered on 10 November. Built for the United States Navy. to the USMC in 1946, laid up in the James River. She was sold to New York shipbreakers in April 1973.

== Kenyon Victory ==
Kenyon Victory was built by California Shipbuilding Corporation. Her keel was laid on 11 April 1945. She was launched on 5 June and delivered on 30 June. Built for the WSA, she was operated under the management of Isthmian Steamship Company. Laid up at Beaumont, Texas in 1950. Returned to service later that year under the management of States Marine Lines Inc. Laid up in the James River in 1952. She was scrapped at Castellón de la Plana in 1985.

== Kershaw ==
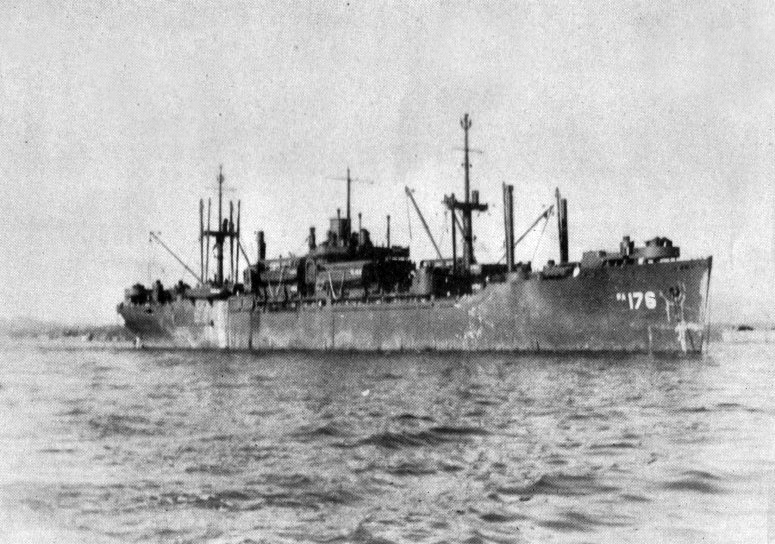
USS Kershaw

Kershaw was built by Oregon Shipbuilding Corporation. Her keel was laid on 29 September 1944. She was launched on 12 November and delivered on 30 November. Built for the United States Navy. Laid up in reserve at Norfolk, Virginia in 1946. To the United States Maritime Administration in 1959. Laid up in the James River. She was scrapped in 1982.

== Kingsbury ==
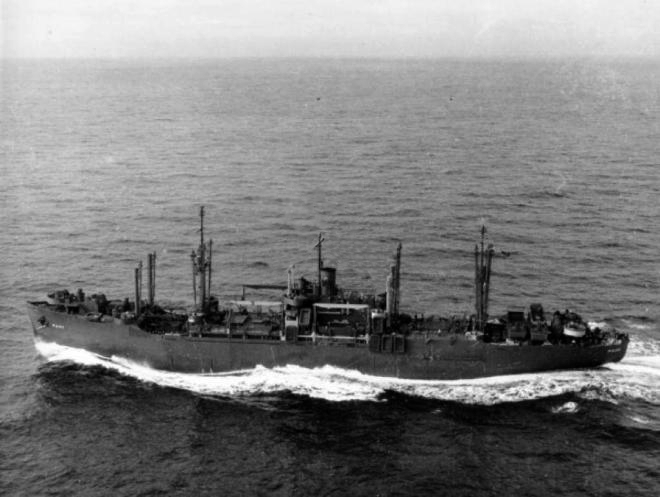
USS Kingsbury

Kingsbury was built by Oregon Shipbuilding Corporation. Her keel was laid on 5 October 1944. She was launched on 16 November and delivered on 5 December. Built for the United States Navy. To the USMC in 1946. Laid up in the James River. She was scrapped in Spain in 1983.

== Kings Point Victory ==
Kings Point Victory was built by Bethlehem Fairfield Shipyard, Baltimore, Maryland. Her keel was laid on 13 October 1944. She was launched on 30 November and delivered on 30 December. Built for the WSA, she was operated under the management of American Export Line. Laid up in the James River in 1946. Sold in 1947 to A/S Det Ostasiatische Kompagni, Copenhagen, Denmark and renamed Tranquebar. Sold in 1955 to Verenigde Nederlandse Navigatie Maatschappij, Den Haag, Netherlands and renamed Maaskerk. Sold in 1966 to West Coast Shipping Inc., Monrovia and renamed Madonna. Sold in 1969 to Liberty Marine Corp., Liberia. She was scrapped at Kaohsiung in January 1971.

== Kingsport Victory ==
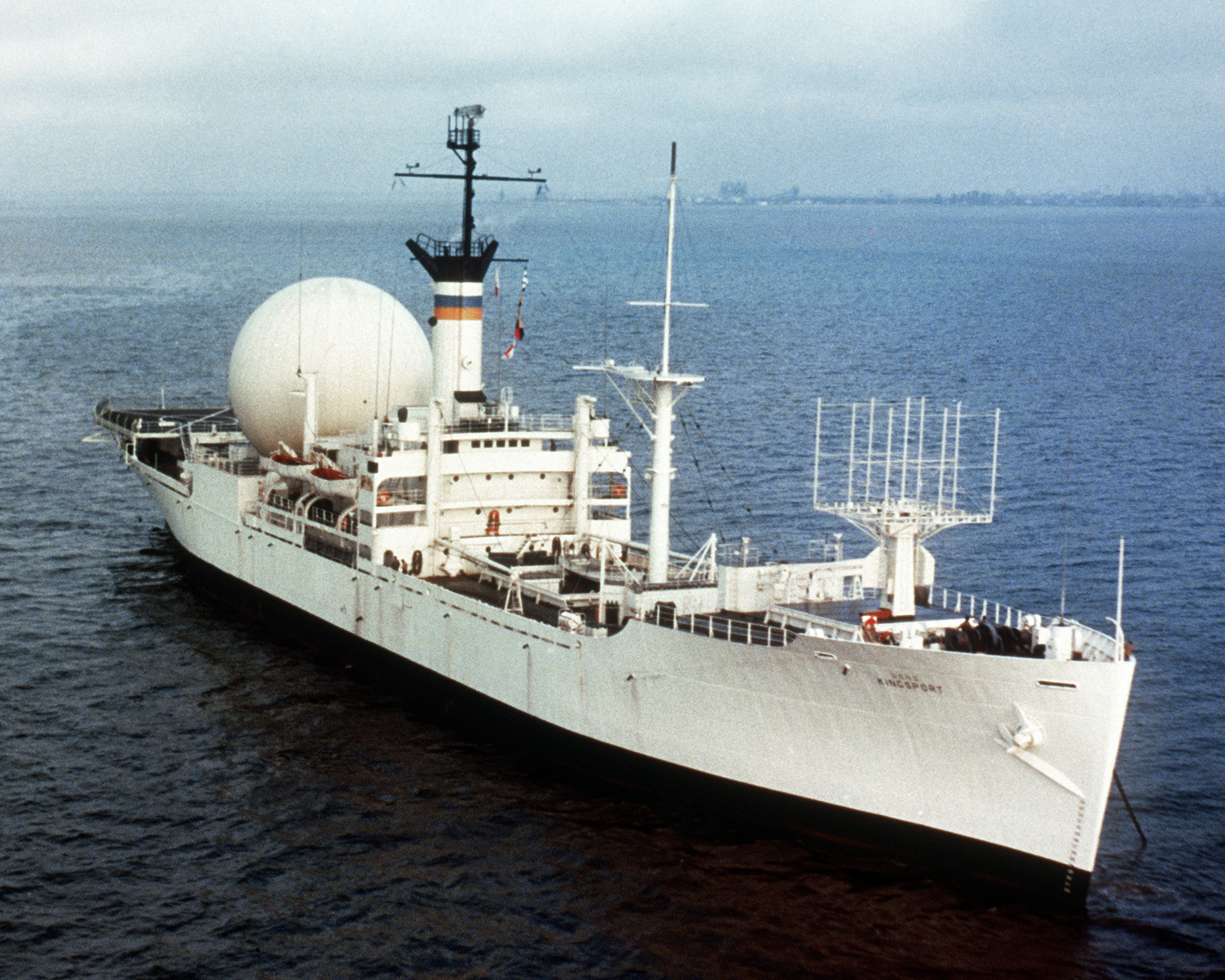
USNS Kingsport

Kingsport Victory was built by California Shipbuilding Corporation. Her keel was laid on 4 April 1944. She was launched on 29 May and delivered on 12 July. Built for the WSA, she was operated under the management of American-Hawaiian Steamship Company. To the United States Army Transportation Corps in 1946. Laid up in the James River on 1947. To the United States Navy in 1950. To the United States Bureau of Ships in 1962. Converted to a satellite communications ship by Willamette Iron & Steel Corporation, Portland, Oregon and Philadelphia Navy Yard, Philadelphia, Pennsylvania. Renamed Kingsport and operated under the management of the United States Army Satellite Communications Agency. Converted to a hydrographic research ship in 1966. Laid up in the James River in 1970. She was scrapped at Alang in 1992.

== Kingston Victory ==
Kingston Victory was a troop transport built by Bethlehem Fairfield Shipyard. Her keel was laid on 11 January 1945. She was launched on 3 March and delivered on 27 March. Built for the WSA, she was operated under the management of Standard Fruit Company. Laid up at Olympia, Washington in 1946. She was sold to American buyers in May 1972. Resold, she arrived at Kaohsiung for scrapping in August 1972.

== Kittson ==
Kittson was built by California Shipbuilding Corporation. Her keel was laid on 25 June 1944. She was launched on 29 August and delivered on 22 December. Built for the United States Navy. To the USMC in 1946 and laid up in the James River. She was sold to New York shipbreakers in April 1973.

== Knox Victory ==
Knox Victory was built by Oregon Shipbuilding Corporation. Her keel was laid on 2 March 1945. She was launched on 13 April and delivered on 11 May. Built for the WSA, she was operated under the management of Olympic Steamship Company. Laid up in the Hudson River in 1948. Chartered to the United States Maritime Commission in 1950. Laid up at Olympia in 1958. To the Military Sea Transportation Service in 1960. Converted to a Missile Range Instrumentation Ship by Avondale Shipyards Inc., Westwego, Louisiana and renamed Huntsville. Laid up in Suisun Bay in 1970. She was scrapped at Terminal Island in 1975.

== Kodiak Victory ==
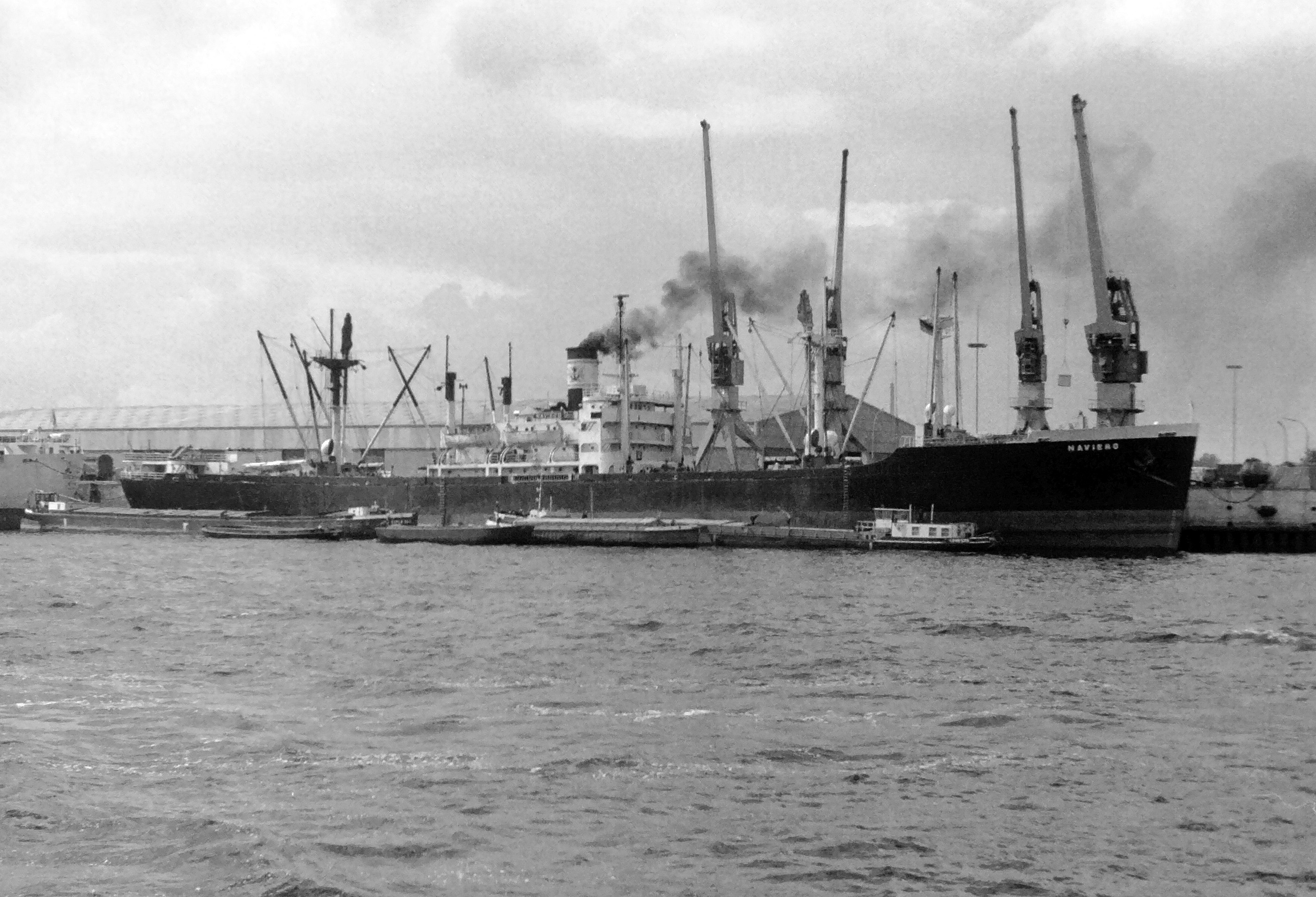
Naviero

Kodiak Victory was built by Oregon Shipbuilding Corporation. Her keel was laid on 16 November 1944. She was launched on 19 December and delivered on 16 January 1945. Built for the WSA, she was operated under the management of Alaska Steamship Company. Sold in 1946 to Compania Argentina de Navigation Dodero, Buenos Aires, Argentina and renamed Naviero. Sold in 1949 to Flota Argentine de Navigation de Ultramar, Buenos Aires. Sold in 1961 to Empresa Lineas Maritimas Argentinas, Buenos Aires. She was scrapped at Campana, Argentina in 1979.

== Kokomo Victory ==
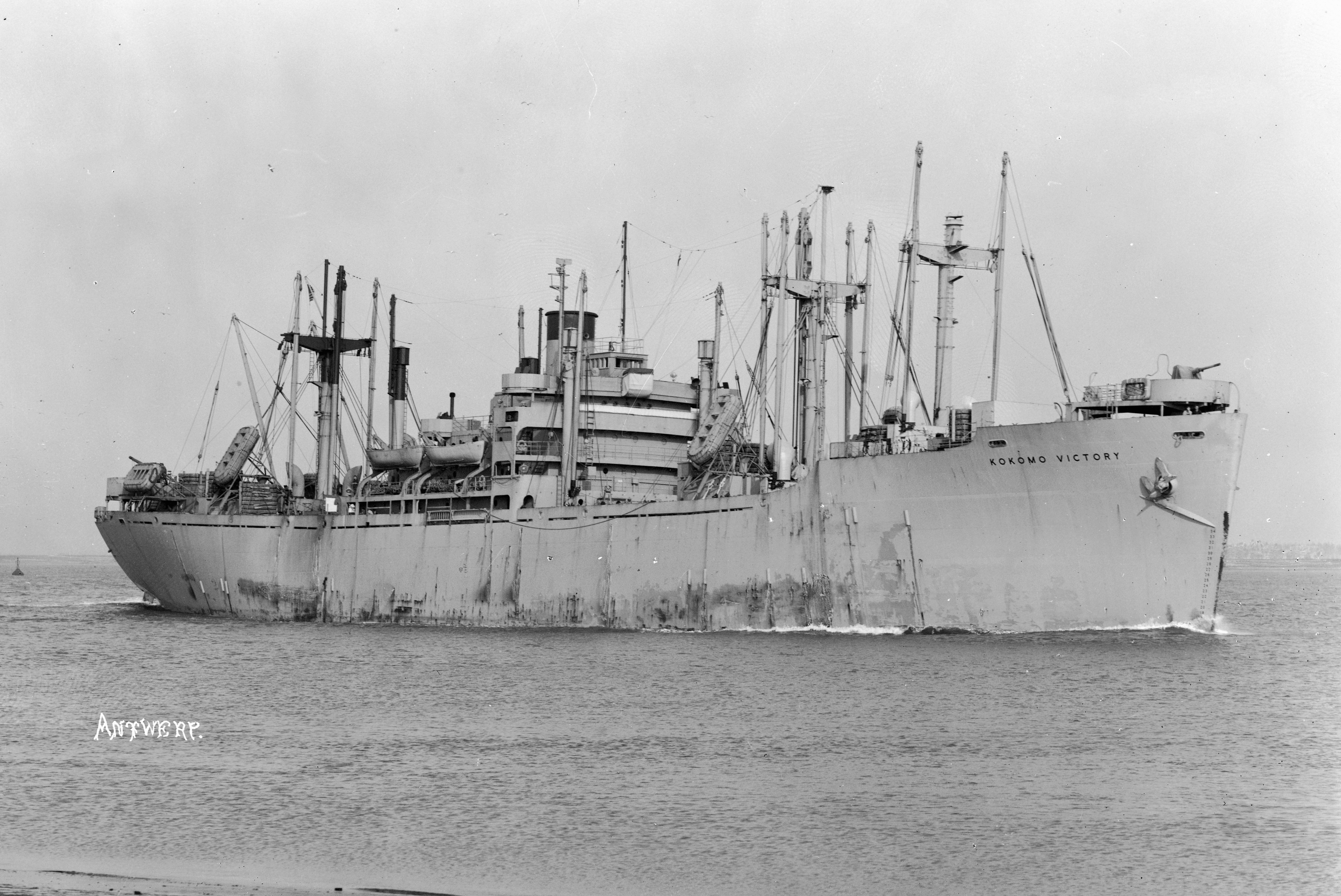
Kokomo Victory

Kokomo Victory was a troop transport built by Bethlehem Fairfield Shipyard. Her keel was laid on 28 October 1944. She was launched on 18 December and delivered on 20 January 1945. Built for the WSA, she was operated under the management of Luckenbach Steamship Co., Inc. Sold in 1947 to N.V. Java-China Paketvaart Lijnen, Amsterdam, Netherlands and renamed Tjibodas. Sold later that year to N.V. Koninklijke Java-China Paketvaart Lijnen, Amsterdam. She was scrapped at Kaohsiung in September 1969.

== Koloa Victory ==
Koloa Victory was built by California Shipbuilding Corporation. Her keel was laid on 19 October 1944. She was launched on 12 December and delivered on 18 January 1945. Built for the WSA, she was operated under the management of Seas Shipping Company. Laid up in the James River in 1946. Sold in 1948 to United States Lines, New York and renamed American Judge. Sold in 1956 to Transcape Shipping Corp., New York and renamed Transcape. Sold in 1957 to Compania Navigation Continental, Liberia. Lengthened by Sasebo Industries, Sasebo City, Japan in May 1959. Now 545 feet 3 inches (166.19 m) overall and 9,623 GRT, 14,013 DWT. Sold in 1961 to T. J. Stevenson & Company, Inc., New York and renamed John F. Shea. Sold in 1969 to Rexford Steamship Corp., New York and renamed Kentuckian. Sold in 1971 to Argonauta Compania Navigation S.A. and Clinton Shipping Corp., Panama and renamed Ossis. She was scrapped at Kaohsiung in August 1971.
