= Kershaw (disambiguation) =

Kershaw is an English-language surname.

Kershaw may also refer to:

== Places in the United States ==
- Kershaw, South Carolina
- Kershaw County, South Carolina

== Other uses ==
- Baron Kershaw, a title in the Peerage of the United Kingdom
- Kershaw Knives, an American cutlery company
- Kershaw Peaks, a group of peaks in Graham Land, Antarctica
- Mount Kershaw, a mountain on Blaiklock Island, Graham Land, Antarctica
- USS Kershaw (APA-176), a WWII U.S. naval transport vessel
