= Joseph Kershaw =

Joseph Kershaw may refer to:

- Joseph B. Kershaw, South Carolina planter, slaveholder, lawyer, judge, and Confederate general
- Joseph Franklin Kershaw, English artist

== See also ==
- Joe Lang Kershaw, member of the Florida House of Representatives
