= Foster Furcolo =

American lawyer, writer, and politician (1911–1995)

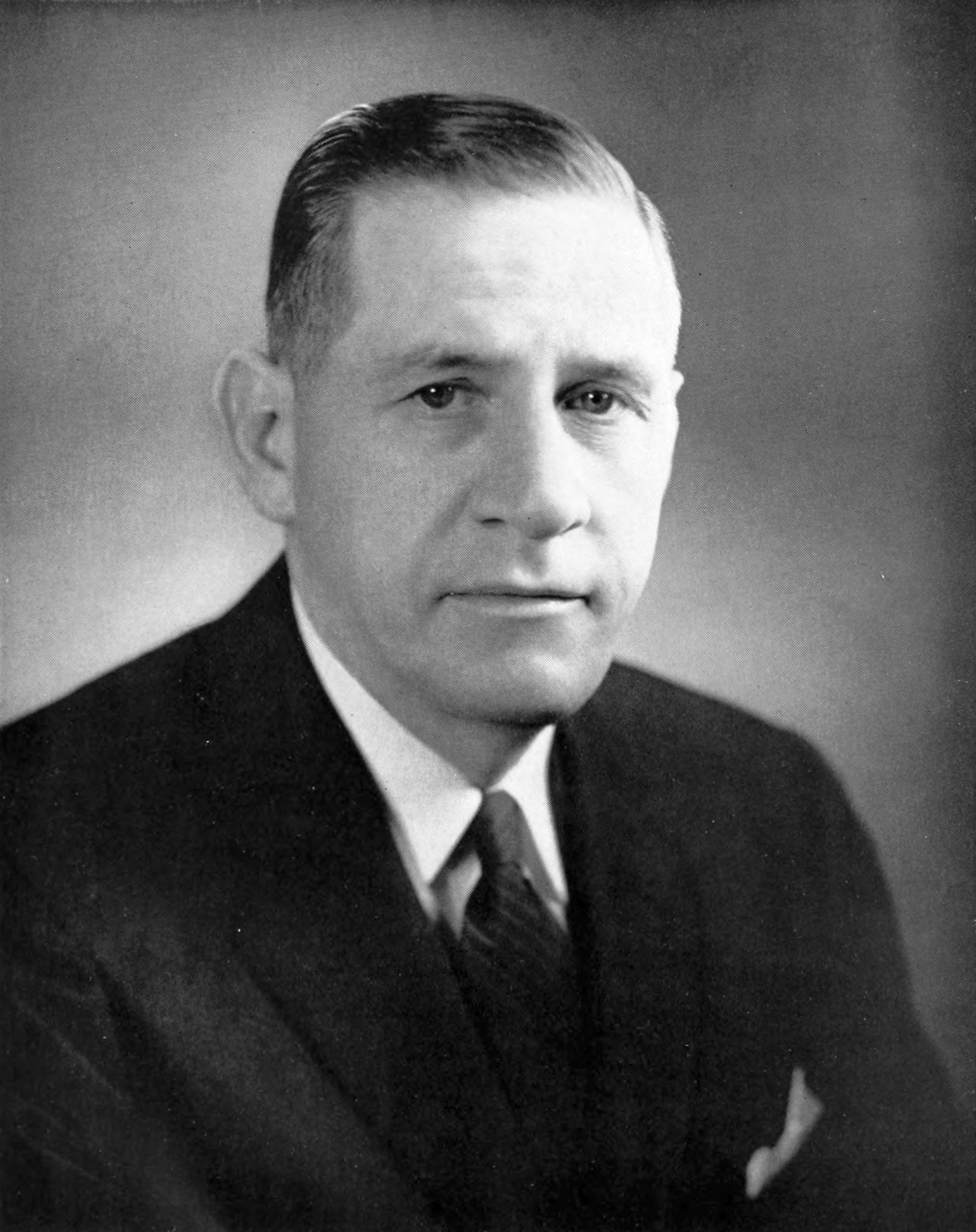

60th Governor of Massachusetts
- In office January 3, 1957 – January 5, 1961
- Lieutenant: Robert F. Murphy
- Preceded by: Christian Herter
- Succeeded by: John A. Volpe

50th Treasurer and Receiver-General of Massachusetts
- In office July 5, 1952 – January 1955
- Governor: Paul A. Dever; Christian A. Herter
- Preceded by: John E. Hurley
- Succeeded by: John Francis Kennedy

Member of the U.S. House of Representatives from Massachusetts's 2nd district
- In office January 3, 1949 – September 30, 1952
- Preceded by: Charles R. Clason
- Succeeded by: Edward Boland

Personal details
- Born: July 29, 1911 New Haven, Connecticut, U.S.
- Died: July 5, 1995 (aged 83) Cambridge, Massachusetts, U.S.
- Party: Democratic
- Education: Yale University
- Profession: Lawyer

Military service
- Allegiance: United States
- Branch/service: United States Navy
- Rank: Lieutenant (junior grade)
- Battles/wars: World War II

John Foster Furcolo (July 29, 1911 – July 5, 1995) was an American lawyer, writer, and Democratic Party politician from Massachusetts. He was the state's 60th governor, and also represented the state as a member of the United States House of Representatives. He was the first Italian-American governor of the state, and an active promoter of community colleges.

Born in New Haven, Connecticut and educated at Yale, Furcolo practiced law before serving in the United States Navy during World War II. He first won election to Congress in 1948, and served most of two terms, resigning after being appointed Massachusetts Treasurer in 1952 by Governor Paul A. Dever. He won two terms as governor, serving from 1957 to 1961. In addition to supporting community colleges, he also furthered the redevelopment of parts of Boston, supporting development of the Prudential Center and Government Center. His administration was overshadowed by corruption scandals, but no charges against him made it to trial. He was twice an unsuccessful candidate for the United States Senate. He was the author of several books, including a novel set amid events surrounding the World War II Katyn massacre.

== Early years ==
John Foster Furcolo was born in New Haven, Connecticut, on July 29, 1911. His father, Charles Furcolo, was an Italian immigrant and a doctor, and his mother was an Irish immigrant. Furcolo attended public schools in Longmeadow, Massachusetts and New Haven. He then attended Yale University, where he graduated in 1933, and finally Yale Law School, where he received his LL.B. in 1936. At Yale he played a variety of sports, serving on both the boxing team (as a welterweight) and the baseball team. According to his brother Charles, he played second base. He was undefeated as a boxer and was encouraged to turn professional, but chose not to. He also engaged in literary pursuits, writing short stories and plays that were produced locally. Furcolo dropped use of his first name when he entered politics.

In 1937 Furcolo moved to Springfield, Massachusetts, where he opened a law practice. He specialized in criminal and civil trial work, and quickly rose in prominence, the quality of his legal preparation and trial work receiving favorable notice from others in the legal community. After a few years he moved his growing family to neighboring Longmeadow. He made his first bid for public office in 1942, an unsuccessful run for district attorney. During World War II he served in U.S. Navy as a lieutenant (junior grade) aboard USS Kershaw, a transport vessel in the Pacific, which participated in the Invasion of Okinawa.

He was a member of the Indian Orchard Council number 183 of the Knights of Columbus.

== House of Representatives ==
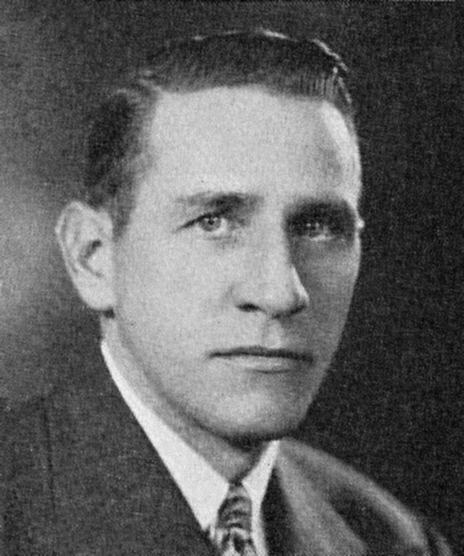
Furcolo as a congressman

In 1946 Furcolo stood for election as a Democratic Party candidate for the 2nd Congressional District seat, running against incumbent Charles R. Clason. He lost by 3,000 votes, a narrow margin, in an election dominated in the state by Republican victories. In 1948, he again ran against Clason, and won by a comfortable margin, buoyed by the support of war veterans and organized labor. In 1950, Furcolo was challenged by Polish-American Republican Charles Skibinski, who sought to capitalize on the large number of Polish-Americans in the district in a campaign in which there were no major issues. Furcolo retained his seat, winning by more than 10,000 out of over 130,000 votes cast.

Furcolo served in the House of Representatives from January 3, 1949, until his resignation on September 30, 1952. He drew national attention when he was the first freshman representative to be invited to the White House by President Harry S. Truman to discuss legislative matters. He innovatively introduced the idea of a "people's council", composed of individuals from a cross-section of his district's interests, which he could consult to gauge opinion on legislative matters. His major legislative proposal, introduced early in his first term, was for a scholarship loan program to help needy high school graduates attend college. Furcolo was adopted as a protégé by the powerful majority leader of the house, Massachusetts Congressman John W. McCormack. McCormack engineered Furcolo's appointment to the powerful House Appropriations Committee. This appointment rankled John F. Kennedy, elected to the body with Furcolo, and Kennedy later blamed Furcolo for hampering his attempts to gain patronage influence from McCormack.

In 1951 Furcolo was appointed to a special committee established to investigate reports of mass killings of Polish military officers and intelligentsia by the Soviets during World War II in the Katyn Forest. Furcolo's appointment to this committee (which was otherwise dominated by Polish-Americans) was also the work of McCormack, likely because of the large Polish-American population in Furcolo's district. The committee concluded that the killings had been perpetrated by the Soviet secret service (NKVD), and sought to bring a case before the International Court of Justice. Furcolo used what he learned from the committee's investigations to write a novel, Rendezvous at Katyn, which is set amid those events.

== Massachusetts Treasurer ==
On July 5, 1952, Furcolo was appointed by Governor Paul A. Dever to be the Treasurer of the Commonwealth of Massachusetts, to replace John E. Hurley, who had resigned to accept a position as clerk of the Boston Municipal Court. Dever made the appointment in part to break up what was seen as Irish-American domination of the government. Congress was in recess at the time of the appointment, so Furcolo did not formally resign his Congressional seat until September. In November 1952, Furcolo was elected in his own right to the Treasurer's office despite Dever's loss of the governor's seat; he held that position until January 1955.

In 1954 Furcolo ran for the U.S. Senate, but was narrowly defeated by incumbent Republican Leverett A. Saltonstall. The election exposed the personal feud between Furcolo and Kennedy to the public. Kennedy refused to make a public endorsement of Furcolo in a televised appearance, and Saltonstall recounted in his memoir that Kennedy's campaign staff worked with his in opposition to Furcolo, and that Saltonstall regularly announced legislation he and Kennedy had cosponsored. Furcolo later learned that Kennedy had lent Ted Sorensen, a key member of his staff, to the Saltonstall campaign, and that Kennedy's father Joseph had financially supported Saltonstall's campaign.

== Massachusetts Governor ==
Furcolo ran for Governor of Massachusetts in 1956, easily winning the Democratic party nomination and primary. The campaign against Republican Lieutenant Governor Sumner G. Whittier was vitriolic, with each accusing the other of distorting his legislative record. Furcolo was further characterized by Republicans as a part of the Dever political machine who would be beholden to Boston interests. Senator Kennedy in this election specifically endorsed Furcolo for the office. Furcolo won the election and was re-elected in 1958, easily defeating former Speaker of the Massachusetts House of Representatives Charles Gibbons, who was chosen by the Republicans as a write-in candidate after their chosen nominee, Attorney General George Fingold, died two months before the election. Furcolo was governor from 1957 to 1961.

Furcolo was a vigorous and active chief executive, working long hours in the office. He came to the office with large-scale visions and worked hard, sometimes stubbornly and against other party interests, to realize some of them. He was not always seen as a "team player" by members of his own party in the legislature whose backgrounds he did not generally share. This was particularly manifested in his push for a broad-based sales tax, opposition to which had been enshrined in the Democratic Party platform; the proposal went down to bipartisan defeat in the legislature. During his administration, Furcolo established a network of regional community colleges throughout the Commonwealth, and fought for increases in state worker salaries, as well as improvements in workmen's compensation and unemployment benefits. He introduced income-tax withholding from payroll checks, leading to a significant increase in state revenue. According to the state's 1960 report, it ranked first in the nation in education and at or near the top in other social programs. He also appointed the state's youngest state purchasing agent, Bernard "Bunny" Solomon, who saved taxpayers hundreds of thousands annually.

Furcolo was a skeptic on the subject of the death penalty, ordering a study of the institution shortly after taking office, and commuted the death sentences of four men while governor. Legislative moves by the state legislature to ban capital punishment stalled in the house during his tenure.

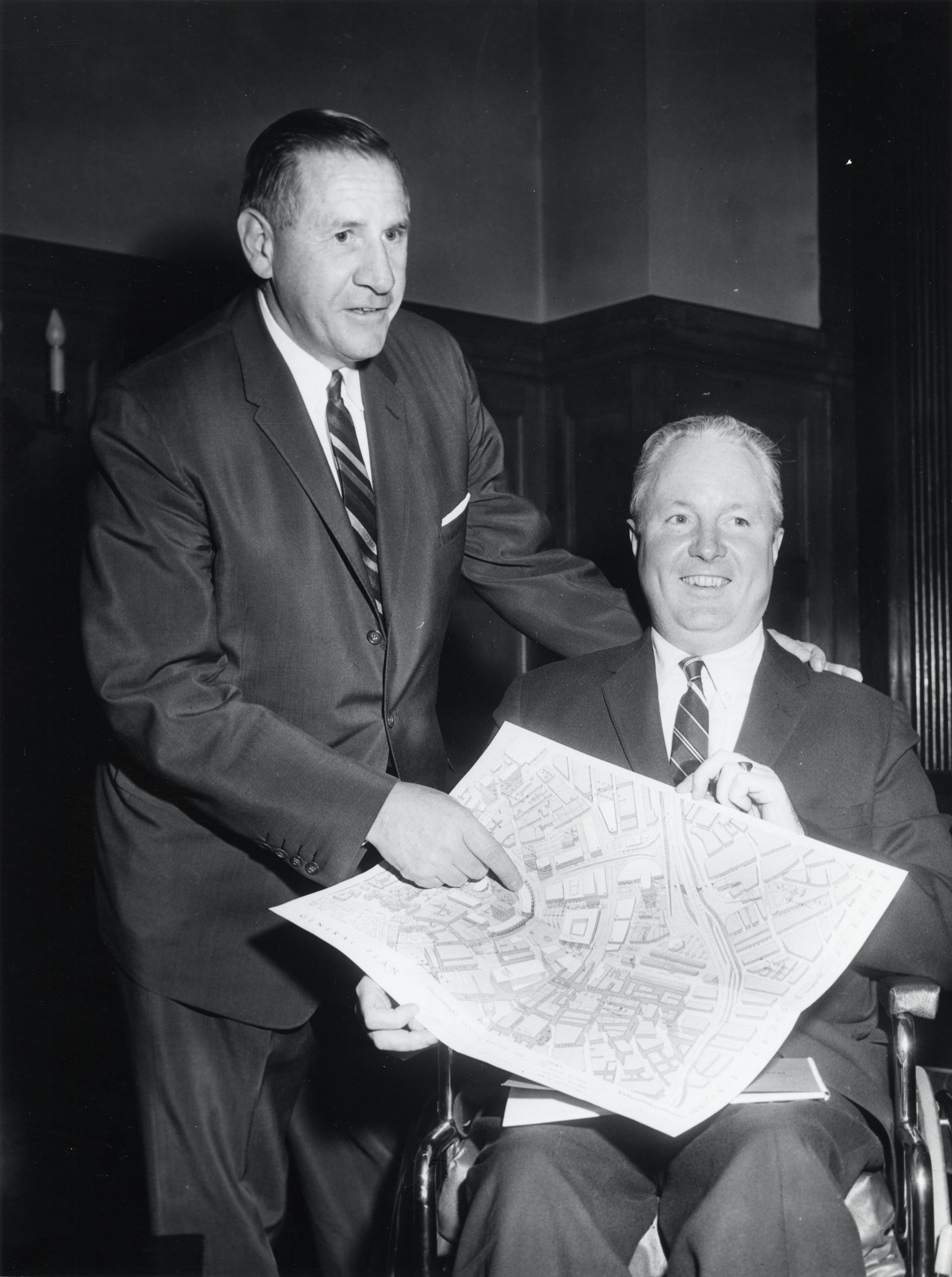
Furcolo and Boston Mayor John F. Collins holding plans for Government Center

Furcolo was an influential figure in the development of Boston's Government Center area as a nexus of local, federal and state offices. He was the first to propose that a federal office building planned for the Back Bay area of the city instead become part of a major redevelopment effort in the declining Scollay Square neighborhood. The effort was primarily spearheaded by Boston Mayors John B. Hynes and John F. Collins, but Furcolo was a regular presence moving the Government Center proposals forward and supporting them at the state level. Using the pseudonym John Foster, in 1957 Furcolo published a comic novel, Let George Do It!, about a campaign for a state legislature seat.

In addition to Government Center, Furcolo was also instrumental in the development of Boston's Prudential Center. The site of an unused railyard in the Back Bay had for some years been the subject of development proposals. Prudential Insurance sought limitations on Boston's tax assessments on the proposed development, and portions of the site were also being considered for use as an extension of the Massachusetts Turnpike. Furcolo helped to broker the deal, making it possible for Prudential to begin construction. The Supreme Judicial Court struck down aspects of the deal regarding the Metropolitan Transportation Authority (MTA, now the MBTA), leading to a work stoppage on the project in 1960.

Furcolo's administration was marked by the continuing trend of corruption in state government that had been growing in prior administrations. One notable series of cases involved the construction of the parking garage under the Boston Common. Furcolo established the Massachusetts Parking Commission to oversee the effort, but did not place it under any sort of oversight. The commission was self-financed by floating bonds, and a number of actors were later documented to extract more the $800,000 from the commission's construction funds by a variety of schemes. Four people were convicted and served prison time for these acts. A second major scandal, involving collusion between state public works officials, appraisers and landowners along planned interstate highway routes, took place in the 1950s. Details of the scams, described by politicians at that time as "the granddaddy" of highway-related malfeasance, were squelched by a Democratic-controlled Congressional investigation until after the 1960 election, apparently to avoid embarrassing Kennedy in his run for president. The scandal resulted in the conviction of several Massachusetts highway officials.

== Second run for Senate ==
In 1960 Furcolo again ran for the U.S. Senate, and was widely expected to gain the Democratic Party nomination easily. However, former Springfield mayor Thomas O'Connor capitalized on the corruption scandals during Furcolo's administration and defeated him in the primary. Furcolo attributed his defeat to his support for the sales tax proposal.

During Furcolo's lame-duck period, John F. Kennedy resigned his Senate seat in December 1960 after winning the presidential election, putting Furcolo in position to appoint a temporary replacement. He initially sought to appoint himself, but was pressured by the Kennedy family to appoint Benjamin Smith (a college roommate of Kennedy's brother Joseph Jr.) nominated by Kennedy's father Joseph instead. The Kennedys wanted the seat to go to younger brother Edward (as it eventually did in the November 1962 special election), but he was ineligible due to age at the time of the appointment.

== Later years ==
Furcolo took the loss badly and decided to leave politics. He returned to private practice, moving to Needham and his law firm to Newton. Four years after leaving office, he was indicted on charges of arranging for a bribe to be paid to members of the Governor's Council (while he was still governor) to secure an appointment for a supporter. The indictment against him was eventually dismissed for lack of evidence, but four councilors were convicted on a variety of charges.

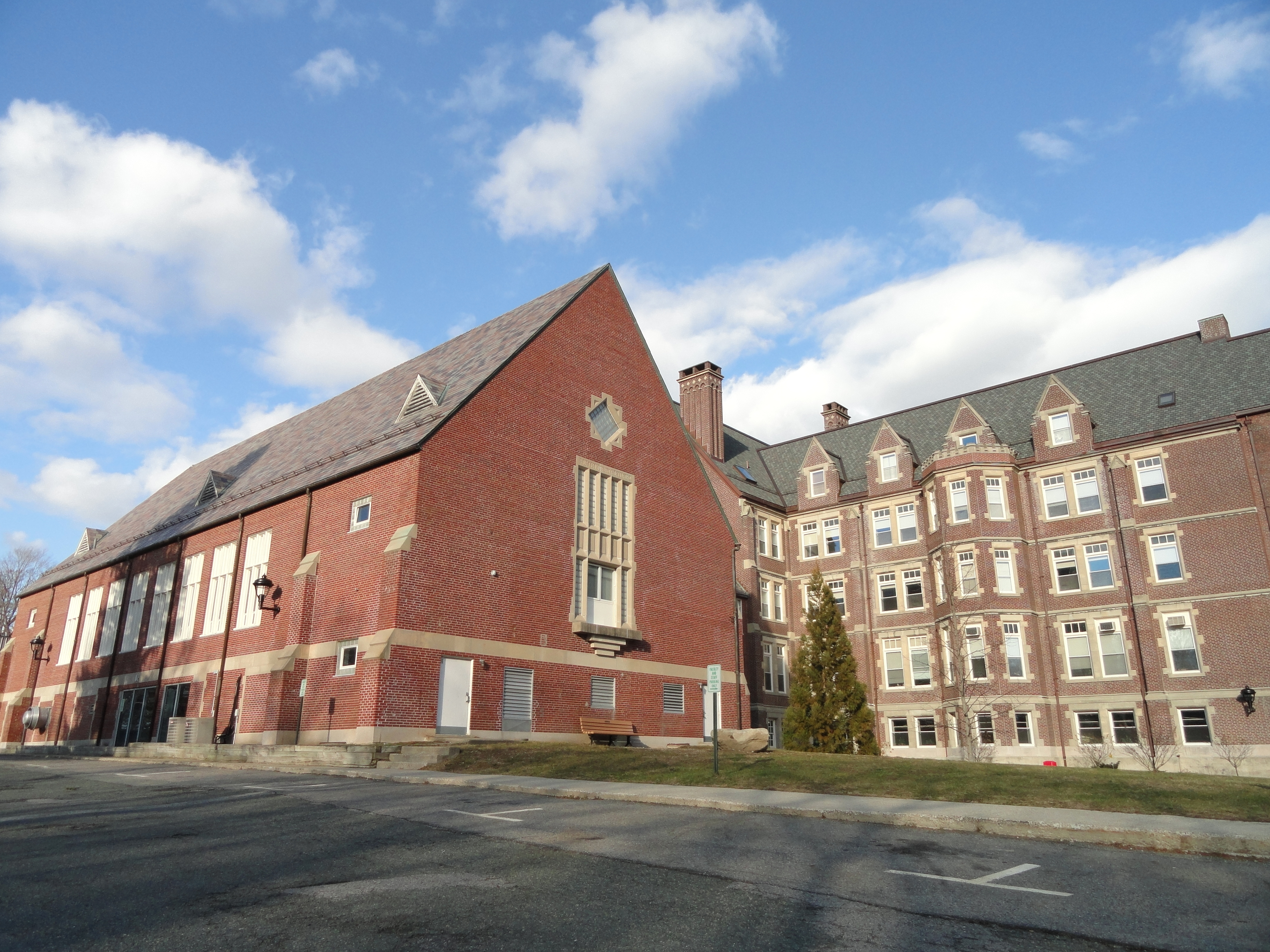
Massachusetts Bay Community College, Wellesley, Massachusetts

In 1966, Furcolo sought the Democratic nomination for Massachusetts attorney general but lost the nomination to former Lieutenant Governor Francis X. Bellotti in September. He worked from 1967 to 1972 as an assistant district attorney for Middlesex County. In 1969, he served on the U.S. Attorney General's Advisory Committee on Narcotics.

Furcolo also began teaching law in 1969. Over the next five years he taught legal ethics at Portia Law School (now the New England School of Law), criminal law at Massachusetts Bay Community College, and government at a number of the state's community colleges. He was selected as an administrative law judge with the U.S. Occupational Safety and Health Review Commission in 1975, a post he held through 1989.

Furcolo maintained an interest in higher education after his departure from elective politics. While a United States Representative he secured the passage of legislation offering loans to needy students, and while governor he enacted significant reforms in the state's university system, granting the individual schools in the system fiscal autonomy. In 1973 he was hired as a full-time professor of public service, working across the entire state college system. He served for many years on the state's board of regents, which was responsible for overseeing the state-run institutions of higher learning. In this capacity, he was often a minority voice in seeking to improve the state's colleges and universities. Because he was dissatisfied with that body's work, in 1981 he supported the formation of an advocacy group to lobby for improvements.

Furcolo died of heart failure at the age of 83 on July 5, 1995, in Cambridge, Massachusetts, and is buried in Holyhood Cemetery in Brookline, Massachusetts.

== Family, awards, and legacy ==
Furcolo was married three times. His first wife Kay, with whom he had five children, died in 1964. In 1967 he married Lucy Carra, who also served as a federal administrative law judge; they had no children. Estranged from Lucy in 1972, he became embroiled in legal disputes with her relatives after her death in 1979. In 1980, Furcolo married Constance M. Gleason, who survived him.

In 2009 Furcolo's support of community colleges was commemorated when the state formally named its network the Governor Foster Furcolo Community College System. He was awarded the Order of Polonia Restituta by the government of Poland for his role in the investigation of Katyn, and he also received the Italian Star of Solidarity. He was awarded honorary degrees from Boston University, Portia Law School, Suffolk University, the University of Massachusetts, and a number of other schools.

== Publications ==
In addition to books, Furcolo wrote articles, stories and essays for a wide variety of publications. His books include:

- Foster, John (1957). Let George Do It!. New York: Harcourt. OCLC 1654901.
- Furcolo, Foster (1973). Pills, People, Problems. Berlin, MA: Research Publishing. OCLC 6822461.
- Furcolo, Foster (1973). Rendezvous at Katyn. Boston: Marlborough House. OCLC 2115628.
- Furcolo, Foster (1975). Law for You. Washington, DC: Acropolis Press. ISBN 9780874911619. OCLC 1498474.
- Furcolo, Foster (1982). Ballots Anyone?. Cambridge, MA: Schenkman Publishing. ISBN 9780870734410. OCLC 8494815.

== General sources ==
- Cutler, John Henry (1972). Ed Brooke: Biography of a Senator. Indianapolis, IN: The Bobbs-Merrill Company. OCLC 1164712.
- Hogarty, Richard (2002). Massachusetts Politics and Public Policy: Studies in Power and Leadership. Amherst, MA: University of Massachusetts Press. ISBN 9781558493513. OCLC 48655943.
- Lapomarda, Vincent A., S.J. (1992). The Knights of Columbus in Massachusetts (Second ed.). Norwood, Massachusetts: Knights of Columbus Massachusetts State Council.
- Lewis, Tom (1997). Divided Highways: Building the Interstate Highways, Transforming American Life. New York: Viking. ISBN 9780670866274. OCLC 36942490.
- Nelson, Garrison (2017). John William McCormack: A Political Biography. Bloomsbury. ISBN 9781628925173.
- O'Connor, Thomas (1995). Building a New Boston: Politics and Urban Renewal, 1950–1970. Boston: Northeastern University Press. ISBN 9781555532468. OCLC 231793654.
- Savage, Sean (2015). The Senator from New England: The Rise of JFK. Albany, NY: SUNY Press. ISBN 9781438457048. OCLC 911033797.

Party political offices
Preceded by John E. Hurley	Democratic nominee for Treasurer and Receiver-General of Massachusetts; 1952	Succeeded by John Francis Kennedy
Preceded by John I. Fitzgerald	Democratic nominee for U.S. Senator from Massachusetts (Class 2); 1954	Succeeded by Thomas J. O'Connor
Preceded by Robert F. Murphy	Democratic nominee for Governor of Massachusetts; 1956, 1958	Succeeded by Joseph D. Ward
U.S. House of Representatives
Preceded by Charles R. Clason	Member of the U.S. House of Representatives from Massachusetts's 2nd congressional district January 3, 1949 – September 30, 1952	Succeeded by Edward Boland
Political offices
Preceded by John E. Hurley	Treasurer and Receiver General of Massachusetts; July 5, 1952 – January 1955	Succeeded by John Francis Kennedy
Preceded by Christian Herter	Governor of Massachusetts; January 3, 1957 – January 5, 1961	Succeeded by John A. Volpe
