= 1954 United States Senate election in Massachusetts =

- November 2, 1954
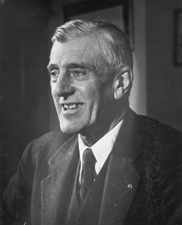

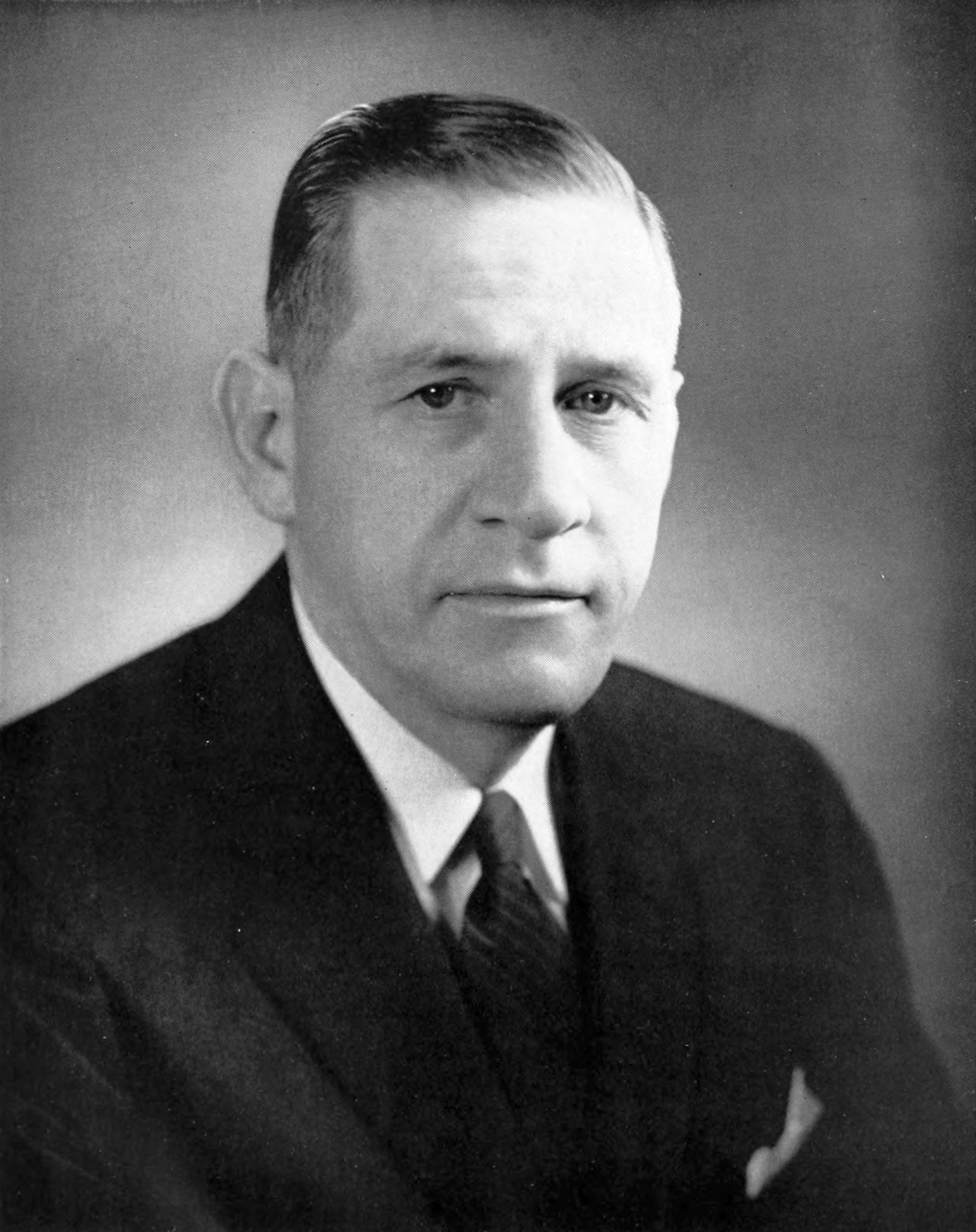
Nominee	Leverett Saltonstall	Foster Furcolo
Party	Republican	Democratic
Popular vote	956,605	927,899
Percentage	50.54%	49.03%
- Saltonstall: 50–60% 60–70% 70–80% 80–90% >90% Furcolo: 50–60% 60–70% 70–80%
Senator before election
Leverett Saltonstall
Republican
Elected Senator
Leverett Saltonstall
Republican

The 1954 United States Senate election in Massachusetts was held on November 2. Republican incumbent Leverett Saltonstall was narrowly reelected to a third term in office over Massachusetts treasurer Foster Furcolo.

Two years later, Furcolo would be elected Governor of Massachusetts.

== Republican primary ==
=== Candidates ===
- Leverett Saltonstall, incumbent U.S. senator since 1945

=== Results ===
Senator Saltonstall was unopposed for re-nomination. He received the unanimous support of all 1,378 delegates to the Republican state convention in Worcester.

== Democratic primary ==
=== Candidates ===
- Foster Furcolo, treasurer and receiver-general of Massachusetts
- John I. Fitzgerald, former member of the Boston City Council and nominee for Senate in 1948
- Joseph L. Murphy, former state senator from South Boston

==== Withdrew ====
- Mark J. Dalton, Boston lawyer

=== Campaign ===
Furcolo received the party endorsement at the state convention in Worcester in June.

=== Results ===
1954 Democratic U.S. Senate primary
Party	Candidate	Votes	%
Democratic	Foster Furcolo	207,232	59.13%
Democratic	Joseph L. Murphy	79,463	22.68%
Democratic	John I. Fitzgerald	63,752	18.19%
Total votes		350,447	100.00%

== General election ==
=== Candidates ===
- Foster Furcolo, treasurer and receiver-general of Massachusetts (Democratic)
- Thelma Ingersoll, nominee for Senate in 1952 (Socialist Workers)
- Harold J. Ireland, nominee for treasurer and receiver-general in 1948 and 1952 (Prohibition)
- Leverett Saltonstall, incumbent U.S. senator since 1945 (Republican)

=== Campaign ===
In October, Furcolo suffered a significant setback when junior senator John F. Kennedy declined to endorse his candidacy after the candidates fought over a television appearance Kennedy made for Furcolo and Democratic gubernatorial nominee Robert F. Murphy. The script called for Kennedy to say, "I wish you both and the entire Democratic ticket every success in November." Instead, Kennedy delivered the line as "I wish you, Bob, and the entire Democratic ticket every success in November." According to Kennedy aide Francis X. Morrissey, Kennedy intentionally omitted Furcolo after an exchange of words between the two men prior to the appearance, in which Furcolo unsuccessfully pressed Kennedy to attack Saltonstall's record during the program. Republican state chairman Elmer Nelson cited Kennedy's decision as "verification that higher type Democratic candidates and voters" supported Saltonstall.

Furcolo was also denied the endorsement of the Massachusetts chapter of Americans for Democratic Action; he had addressed the chapter the prior fall and urged it to disband for the good of the Democratic Party.

=== Results ===
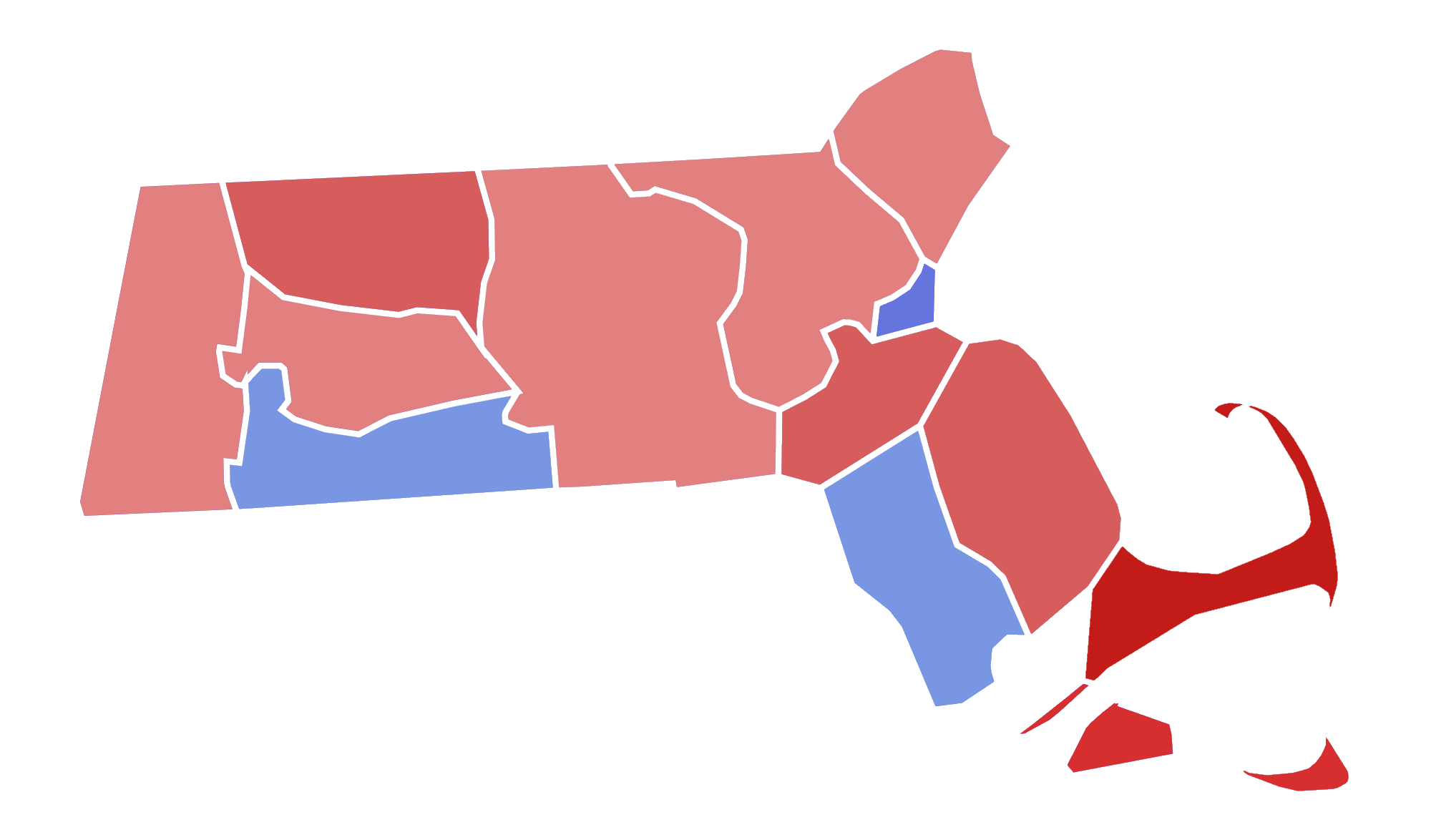
Results by county

General election
Party	Candidate	Votes	%	±%
Republican	Leverett Saltonstall (incumbent)	956,605	50.54%	▼2.41
Democratic	Foster Furcolo	927,899	49.03%	▲2.60
Socialist Labor	Thelma Ingersoll	5,353	0.28%	▼0.17
Prohibition	Harold J. Ireland	2,832	0.15%	▼0.03
Total votes		1,892,689	100.00%	
