= USNS Wheeling =

US missile range instrumentation ship

History

United States
- Name: Seton Hall Victory; Wheeling
- Namesake: Seton Hall University; Wheeling, West Virginia
- Builder: Oregon Shipbuilding Corporation, Portland, Oregon
- Laid down: 10 April 1945, as Seton Hall Victory, type (VC2-S-AP3), hull, MCV hull 686
- Sponsored by: Mrs. Ross Mclntyre
- Acquired: by the Navy in 1962
- In service: 28 May 1964 as USNS Wheeling (T-AGM-8)
- Out of service: date unknown
- Stricken: 31 October 1990
- Fate: Assumed sunk from a 1981 Harpoon missile exercise attack

General characteristics
- Class & type: Victory ship type VC2-S-AP2, standard; Watertown-class missile range instrumentation ship
- Tonnage: 10,750 DWT; 7,612 GRT
- Displacement: 15,200 long tons (15,444 t) (standard)
- Length: 455 feet 3 inches (139 m) oa; 436 feet 6 inches (133 m) pp; 444 feet (135 m) lwl
- Beam: 62 feet (19 m)
- Draft: 28 ft (8.5 m)
- Installed power: 2 × Oil fired boilers; 6,000 hp (4,500 kW)
- Propulsion: 2 × steam turbines; 1 × screw propeller
- Speed: 15 knots (28 km/h; 17 mph)
- Capacity: 523,740 cubic feet (14,831 m^{3}) (grain); 453,210 cubic feet (12,833 m^{3}) (bale)
- Complement: 38–62 USMM; 21–40 USNAG
- Armament: Varied by ship; Bow-mounted 3 inches (76 mm)/50 caliber gun; Stern-mounted 5 inches (127 mm)/50 caliber gun; 8 × single 20 millimeters (0.79 in) Oerlikon anti-aircraft (AA) cannons and/or,

USNS Wheeling (T-AGM-8) was a Wheeling-class missile range instrumentation ship acquired by the U.S. Navy in 1962 and converted from her Victory ship cargo configuration to a missile tracking ship, a role she retained for a number of years before being sunk as a target by Harpoon missiles on 12 July 1981.

== Victory ship built in Oregon ==
The second ship to be so named by the Navy, Wheeling was laid down on 10 April 1945 as Seton Hall Victory by the Oregon Shipbuilding Corporation under a U.S. Maritime Commission contract (MCV hull 686); launched on 22 May 1945; sponsored by Mrs. Ross Mclntyre; and delivered to the Maritime Commission on 21 June 1945.

== World War II-related service ==
From July 1945 to September 1957, Seton Hall Victory was operated for the U.S. Maritime Commission by a succession of civilian contractors, beginning with the Olympic Steamship Line and ending with Pope & Talbot, Inc. In September 1957, she was placed out of service and was berthed in Virginia's James River with the National Defense Reserve Fleet.

== Conversion to missile tracker ==
Late in 1962, she was turned over to the Navy Department for conversion to a missile range instrumentation ship. On 19 March 1963, she was renamed Wheeling and designated AGM-8. On 28 May 1964, Wheeling was assigned to the Military Sea Transportation Service to be operated by a civil service crew in support of operations on the Navy's Pacific Missile Range.

Wheeling spent her missile tracking years as a mobile tracking station, recording data on missiles and satellites that were out of range of land-based stations. For a number of years she remained on active service on the Pacific coast.

Two other ships were reconfigured in to this new class, Watertown-class missile range instrumentation ship, the USNS Watertown (T-AGM-6) and the USNS Huntsville (T-AGM-7).

== Surveillance of French Nuclear Tests ==
During the summers of 1972 and 1973, Wheeling spent about three months each year in the South Pacific conducting research and surveillance operations in the vicinity of the French nuclear test site at Mururoa Atoll. The operations were conducted under the control of the Defense Nuclear Agency, with the primary contractor being the Stanford Research Institute

== Inactivation and sinking ==
Wheeling remained in service until (date unknown) and was struck from the Navy List on 31 October 1990. However, during a naval exercise on 12 July 1981 she was assigned as target ship for Harpoon missile testing. She was struck by two Harpoons, one launched from a submarine and one from a P-3 Orion aircraft. A third Harpoon, planned for launch from a ship, was not launched. Details of how and when the ship sank, or was otherwise disposed of, are lacking.
