= USNS Watertown =

American tracking ship

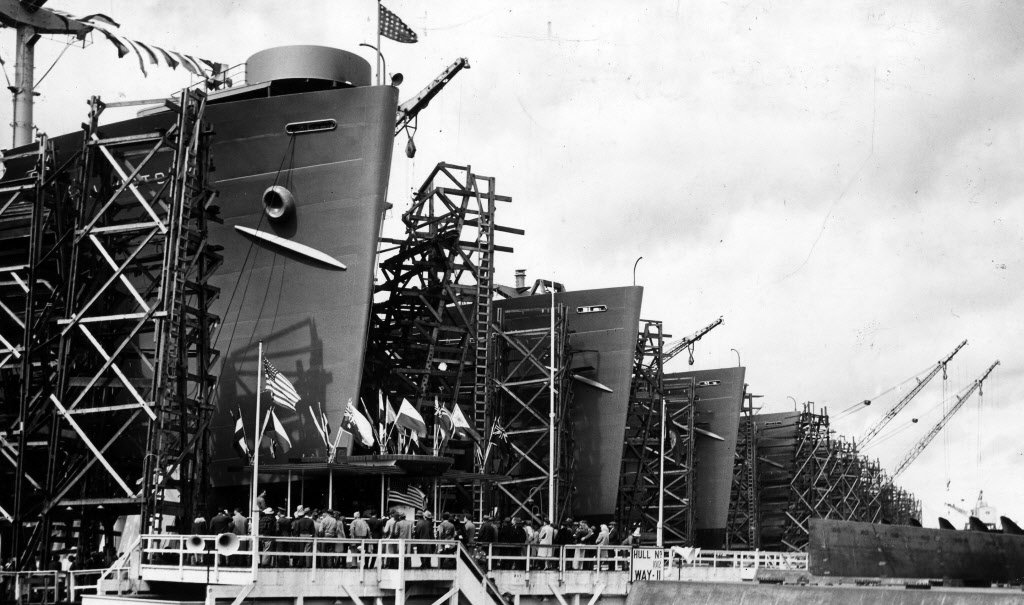
- Oregon Shipbuilding Corporation, SS Niantic Victory with her sister ships 1944

History

United States
- Name: Niantic Victory
- Namesake: Niantic, Connecticut
- Owner: War Shipping Administration
- Operator: American-Hawaiian Steamship Company
- Ordered: as type (VC2-S-AP3) hull, MCV hull 100
- Builder: Oregon Shipbuilding Corporation, Portland, Oregon
- Laid down: 12 February 1944
- Launched: 25 April 1944
- Completed: 18 May 1944
- Out of service: 1948, Laid up Wilmington, then transferred to Suisun Bay.
- Fate: Transferred to US Navy in 1960

United States
- Name: Watertown
- Namesake: Cities and towns in the states of Watertown, Massachusetts, Watertown, New York, Watertown, South Dakota, Watertown, Wisconsin, and Watertown, Connecticut
- Acquired: by the Navy in 1960
- In service: 11 August 1960 as USNS Watertown (T-AGM-6)
- Out of service: 1971
- Stricken: 16 February 1971
- Fate: Sold for scrapping, 23 May 1974

General characteristics
- Class & type: Victory ship type VC2-S-AP2, standard; Watertown-class missile range instrumentation ship
- Tonnage: 10,750 DWT; 7,612 GRT
- Displacement: 15,200 long tons (15,444 t) (standard)
- Length: 455 feet 3 inches (139 m) oa; 436 feet 6 inches (133 m) pp; 444 feet (135 m) lwl
- Beam: 62 feet (19 m)
- Draft: 28 ft (8.5 m)
- Installed power: 2 × Oil fired boilers; 6,000 hp (4,500 kW)
- Propulsion: 2 × steam turbines; 1 × screw propeller
- Speed: 15 knots (28 km/h; 17 mph)
- Capacity: 523,740 cubic feet (14,831 m^{3}) (grain); 453,210 cubic feet (12,833 m^{3}) (bale)
- Complement: 38–62 USMM; 21–40 USNAG
- Armament: Varied by ship; Bow-mounted 3 inches (76 mm)/50 caliber gun; Stern-mounted 5 inches (127 mm)/50 caliber gun; 8 × single 20 millimeters (0.79 in) Oerlikon anti-aircraft (AA) cannons and/or,

USNS Watertown (T-AGM-6) was a Watertown-class missile range instrumentation ship acquired by the United States Navy in 1960 and converted from her SS Niantic Victory Victory ship cargo configuration to a missile tracking ship, a role she retained for eleven years before being placed out of service in 1971.

== Victory ship constructed in Oregon ==
Niantic Victory was laid down on 12 February 1944 at Portland, Oregon, by the Oregon Shipbuilding Corporation under a U.S. Maritime Commission contract (MCV hull 100); launched on 25 April 1944; sponsored by Mrs. Marvin Owen; and delivered to the Maritime Commission on 18 May 1944. She was built in just 96 days under the Emergency Shipbuilding program by the War Shipping Administration.

== Maritime service ==
=== World War II ===
From 1944 until 1957, Niantic Victory was operated for the U.S. Maritime Commission by a succession of contractor firms. Her first operator was the American-Hawaiian Steamship Company for service during World War II starting on 18 May 1944. She supplied cargo in the Pacific Ocean for the Pacific War. After the war on 6 November 1946 she was operated by Waterman SS Corporation as part of the Marshall Plan. On 30 May 1948 after completing her relief efforts she was removed from service and placed in the National Defense Reserve Fleet in Wilmington, N.C. She was laid up till 24 August 1950, but with a new war starting in the Far East she was remove cleaned up and chartered to Union Sulphur and Oil Company.

=== Korean War ===
During the Korean War she was operated by the Union Sulphur and Oil Company. SS Niantic Victory served as merchant marine naval supplying goods for the Korean War. About 75 percent of the personnel taking to Korean from the Korean War came by the merchant marine. SS Niantic Victory transported goods, mail, food and other supplies. About 90 percent of the cargo was moved by merchant marine naval to the war zone. SS Niantic Victory made trip between 18 November 1950 and 23 December 1952 helping American forces engaged against Communist aggression in South Korea. At the end of the war on 8 April 1955 her operator was changed to Pope and Talbot SS Company. On 11 December 1956 operator was changed to Isbrandtsen Company till 1957. She was laid up in the National Defense Reserve Fleet in Suisun Bay, Benicia, Calif., on 24 January 1958.

== US Navy ==
On 11 August 1960 she was transferred to the US Navy. She was reassigned to the Military Sea Transportation Service (MSTS) for conversion to a Missile Range Instrumentation Ship. Conversion was completed 27 November 1960 and she was renamed the USNS Watertown (T-AGM-6). She was lead ship of three ships in her class.

== Missile tracking service ==
Niantic Victory was now the Navy Department Military Sea Transportation Service range instrumentation ship, USNS Watertown (T-AGM-6). For the next 11 years, she served in the Pacific Ocean in support of the National Aeronautics and Space Administration and the U.S. Air Force on the latter service's Western Missile Test Range. She operated as a mobile tracking station, recording test data from missiles and satellites out of range of land-based stations.

Watertown carried instrumentation to track and record flight events for military missile and NASA crewed spacecraft, extending the coverage of the tracking network over the Pacific Ocean. She was slated at one time to be part of the Apollo 8 recovery team but was dropped from the program. In 1969, she called at Pitcairn Island.

Two other ships were reconfigured in to this new class, Watertown-class missile range instrumentation ship, the USNS Huntsville (T-AGM-7) and the USNS Wheeling (T-AGM-8).

== Inactivation ==
In February 1971, the Air Force decided that it no longer required Watertown's services and she was removed from service. Her name was struck from the Navy Directory on 16 February 1972, and she was returned to the Maritime Administration at its berthing facility at Suisun Bay, California, on 23 May 1974. She was sold to Dongkuk Steel Mill Co., Ltd on 23 May 1974 and scrapped in Pusan, South Korea. She arrived in South Korea on 16 July 1974.
