= John Kershaw =

John or Jack Kershaw may refer to:

- Jack Kershaw (1913–2010), U.S. attorney
- Jack Kershaw (footballer) (active 1919–1928), English-born player moved to America
- John Kershaw (American politician) (1765–1829), U.S. Representative from South Carolina.
- John Kershaw (cricketer) (1854–1903), played for England
- John Kershaw (entomologist) (1871–1959), British entomologist who worked in South China
- John Kershaw (writer) (active 1964–1994), British screenwriter and script editor
- John Anthony Kershaw (1915–2008), British Conservative Party Member of Parliament
