= 1958 Massachusetts gubernatorial election =

- November 4, 1958
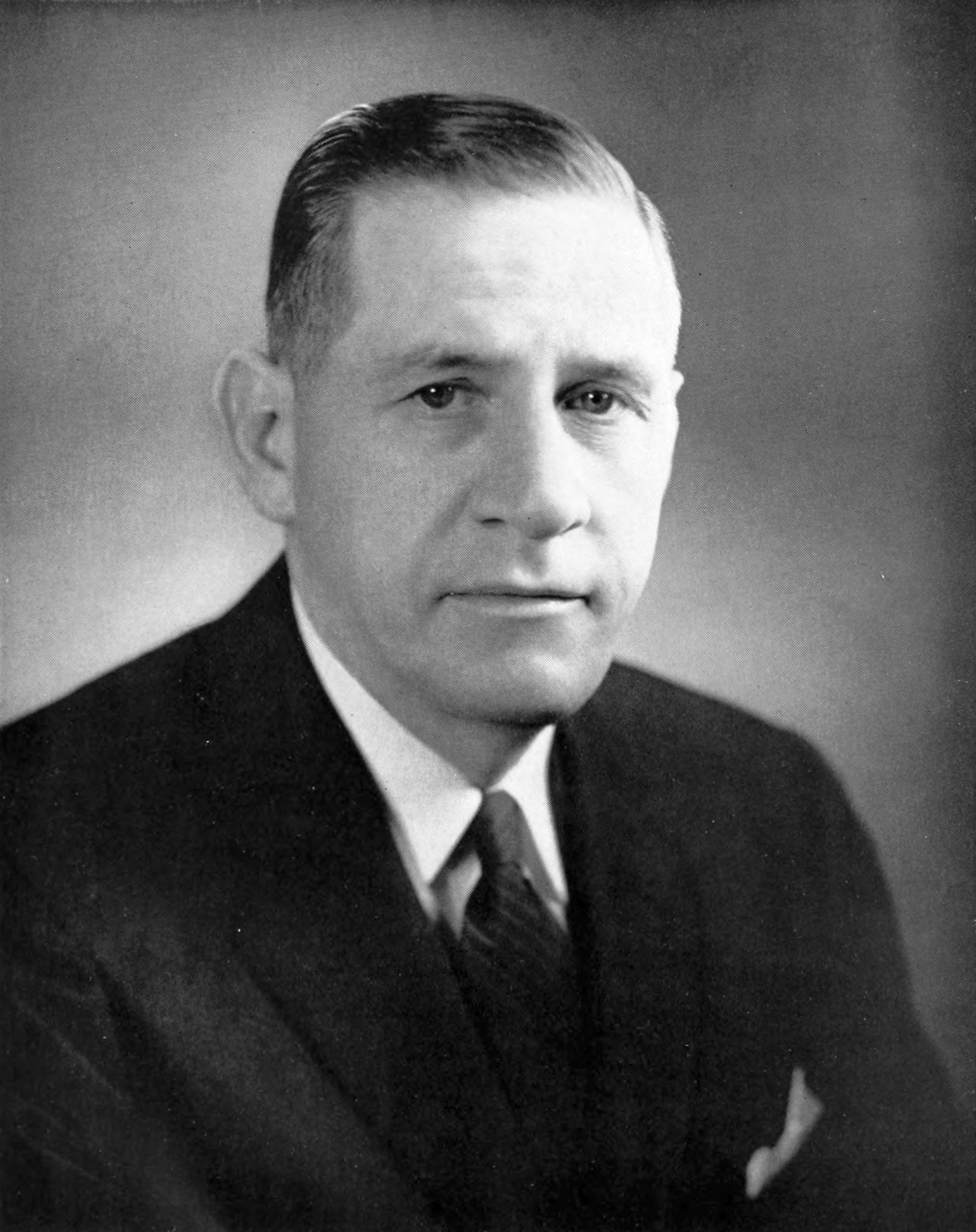

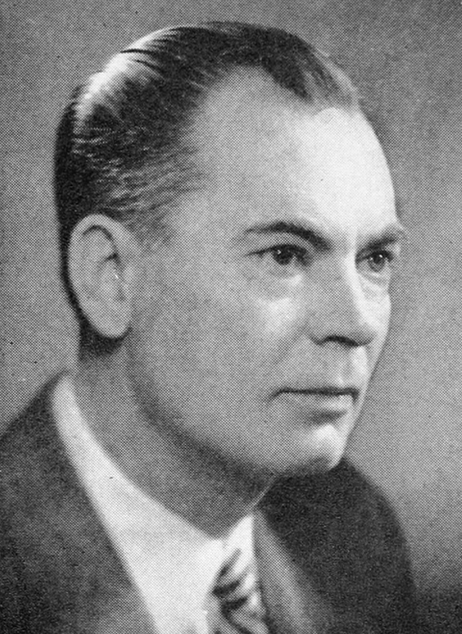
Nominee	Foster Furcolo	Charles Gibbons
Party	Democratic	Republican
Popular vote	1,067,020	818,463
Percentage	56.19%	43.10%
- Furcolo: 50–60% 60–70% 70–80% Gibbons: 40–50% 50–60% 60–70% 70–80% 80–90% >90% Tie: 40–50%
Governor before election
Foster Furcolo
Democratic
Elected Governor
Foster Furcolo
Democratic

The 1958 Massachusetts gubernatorial election was held on November 4, 1958. Democrat Foster Furcolo was elected governor of Massachusetts for a second term, defeating Republican Charles Gibbons, Socialist Labor candidate Henning A. Blomen, and Prohibition candidate Guy S. Williams.

== Democratic primary ==
=== Candidates ===
- Foster Furcolo, incumbent governor

=== Results ===
Governor Furcolo was unopposed for renomination.

== Republican primary ==
=== Candidates ===
- George Fingold, Massachusetts attorney general (died August 31)

==== Write-in candidates ====
- Charles Gibbons, former speaker of the Massachusetts House of Representatives and nominee for lt. governor in 1956
- Joseph P. McKay, assistant attorney general
- John Volpe, former public works commissioner

=== Campaign ===
Attorney General George Fingold was unopposed in the Republican primary.

On August 31, 1958, Fingold died unexpectedly at his home in Concord, Massachusetts. As his death occurred only nine days before the primary, Fingold was the only candidate for Governor on the Republican ballot. Former Speaker of the Massachusetts House of Representatives Charles Gibbons, former State Public Works Commissioner John A. Volpe, and Assistant Attorney General Joseph P. McKay ran as write-in candidates.

=== Results ===
1958 Republican gubernatorial primary
Party	Candidate	Votes	%
Republican	Charles Gibbons (write-in)	158,944	84.32%
Republican	George Fingold (deceased)	23,031	12.22%
Republican	John A. Volpe (write-in)	3,703	1.96%
Republican	Joseph P. McKay (write-in)	1,751	0.93%
Write-in		1,081	0.57%
Total votes		188,510	100.00%

== General election ==
=== Results ===
Massachusetts gubernatorial election, 1958
Party	Candidate	Votes	%	±%
Democratic	Foster Furcolo (incumbent)	1,067,020	56.19%	▲3.43
Republican	Charles Gibbons	818,463	43.10%	▼3.77
Socialist Labor	Henning A. Blomen	7,871	0.42%	▲0.17
Prohibition	Guy S. Williams	5,745	0.30%	▲0.18

== See also ==
- 1957–1958 Massachusetts legislature
