= John Kershaw (cricketer) =

English cricketer

John Edward Kershaw (12 January 1854 – 29 November 1903) was an English cricketer active from 1877 to 1885 who played for Lancashire. He was born in Heywood and died in Burnley. He appeared in 35 first-class matches as a righthanded batsman and sometimes as a wicketkeeper. He scored 582 runs with a highest score of 66 and held 15 catches with one stumping.
