= Harry Kershaw =

English rugby league footballer

Playing information
- Position: Fullback, Halfback
Club
Years	Team	Pld	T	G	FG	P
1895–1900	Wakefield Trinity	54	11	3	0	39

Harry Kershaw was a professional rugby league footballer who played in the 1890s and 1900s. He played at club level for Wakefield Trinity, as a fullback, or half-back. He played fullback in Wakefield Trinity's first ever match in the Northern Union (now the Rugby Football League), the 0-11 defeat by Bradford F.C. during the inaugural 1895–96 season at Park Avenue, Bradford on Saturday 7 September 1895.

== Playing career ==
=== Drop-goals (field-goals) ===
Harry Kershaw appears to have scored no drop-goals (or field-goals as they are currently known in Australasia), but prior to the 1974–75 season all goals, whether; conversions, penalties, or drop-goals, scored 2-points, consequently prior to this date drop-goals were often not explicitly documented, therefore '0' drop-goals may indicate drop-goals not recorded, rather than no drop-goals scored. In addition, prior to the 1949–50 season, the archaic field-goal was also still a valid means of scoring points.
