= 1956 Massachusetts gubernatorial election =

- November 6, 1956
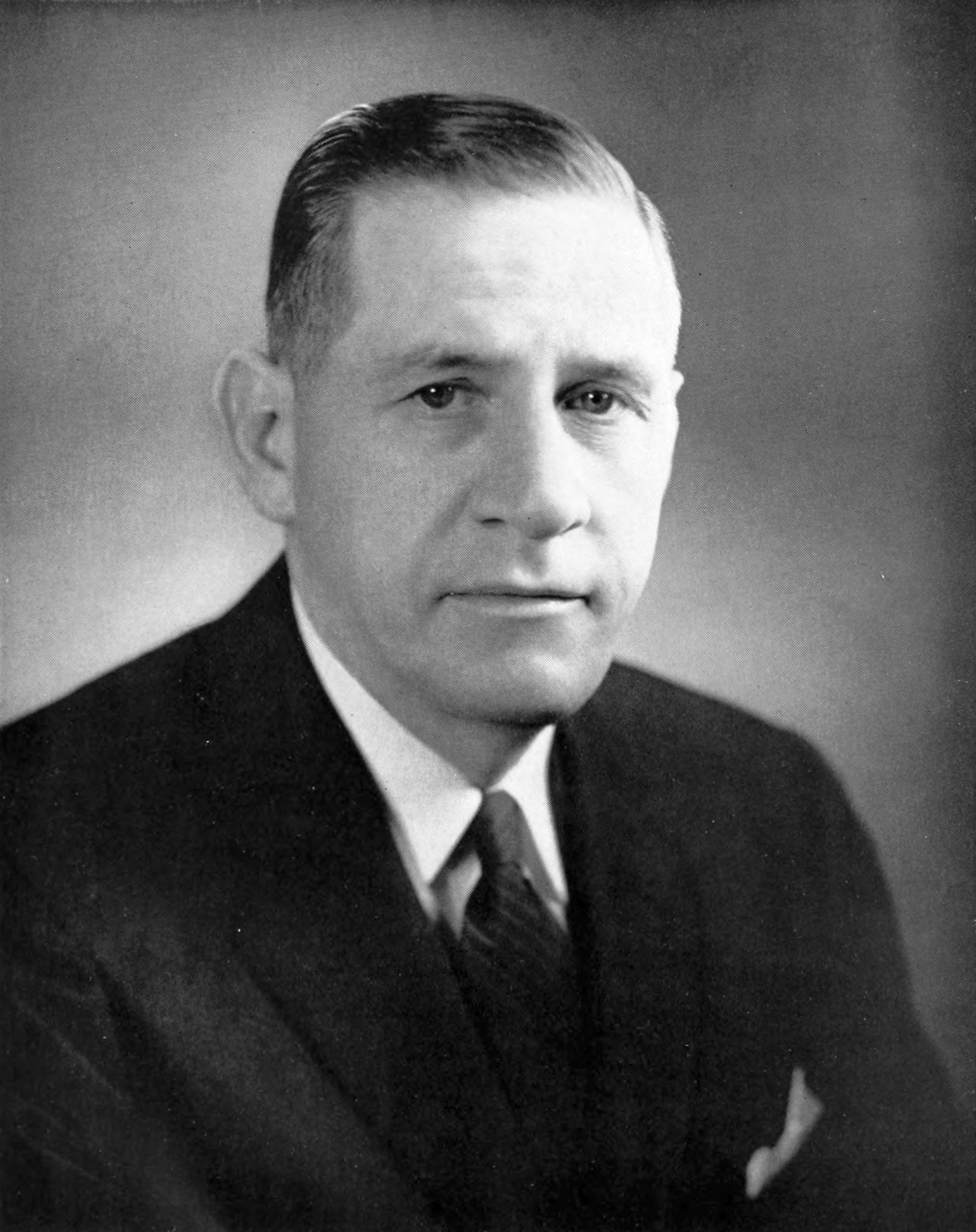

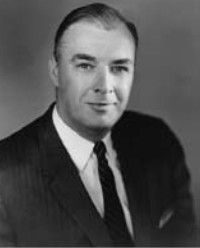
Nominee	Foster Furcolo	Sumner G. Whittier
Party	Democratic	Republican
Popular vote	1,234,618	1,096,759
Percentage	52.76%	46.87%
- Furcolo: 50–60% 60–70% 70–80% Whittier: 40–50% 50–60% 60–70% 70–80% 80–90%
Governor before election
Christian A. Herter
Republican
Elected Governor
Foster Furcolo
Democratic

The 1956 Massachusetts gubernatorial election was held on November 6, 1956. Democrat Foster Furcolo was elected governor of Massachusetts to replace incumbent Christian Herter, who did not run for re-election. Furcolo defeated Republican Sumner G. Whittier, Socialist Labor candidate Henning A. Blomen, and Prohibition candidate Mark R. Shaw.

In the race for lieutenant governor, Democrat Robert F. Murphy defeated Republican Charles Gibbons, Prohibition candidate Harold E. Bassett, and Socialist Labor candidate Francis A. Votano.

== Republican primary ==
=== Candidates ===
- Sumner Whittier, lieutenant governor of Massachusetts

=== Results ===
Lt. Governor Whittier was unopposed in the Republican primary.

== Democratic primary ==
=== Candidates ===
- Thomas H. Buckley, former Massachusetts auditor
- Foster Furcolo, former treasurer and receiver-general of Massachusetts

=== Results ===
Democratic gubernatorial primary, 1956
Party	Candidate	Votes	%
Democratic	Foster Furcolo	358,051	78.65%
Democratic	Thomas Henry Buckley	131,496	21.35%

== General election ==
=== Results ===
Massachusetts gubernatorial election, 1956
Party	Candidate	Votes	%	±%
Democratic	Foster Furcolo	1,234,618	52.76%	▲4.96
Republican	Sumner G. Whittier	1,096,759	46.87%	▼4.89
Socialist Labor	Henning A. Blomen	5,799	0.25%	▼0.05
Prohibition	Mark R. Shaw	2,692	0.12%	▼0.02

== See also ==
- 1955–1956 Massachusetts legislature
