= Olympic Steamship Company =

Former US Shipping Company

- Industry: Transportation, shipping, warehouse, and distribution
- Founded: 1925 in Seattle, Washington
- Key people: John Ambler; Charles A. Wallace; William W. Shorthill; Joseph L. Carman, Jr.; Ernest Clayton; Ernest C. Bentzen
- Subsidiaries: Salmon Terminals
- Website: https://salmonterminals.com

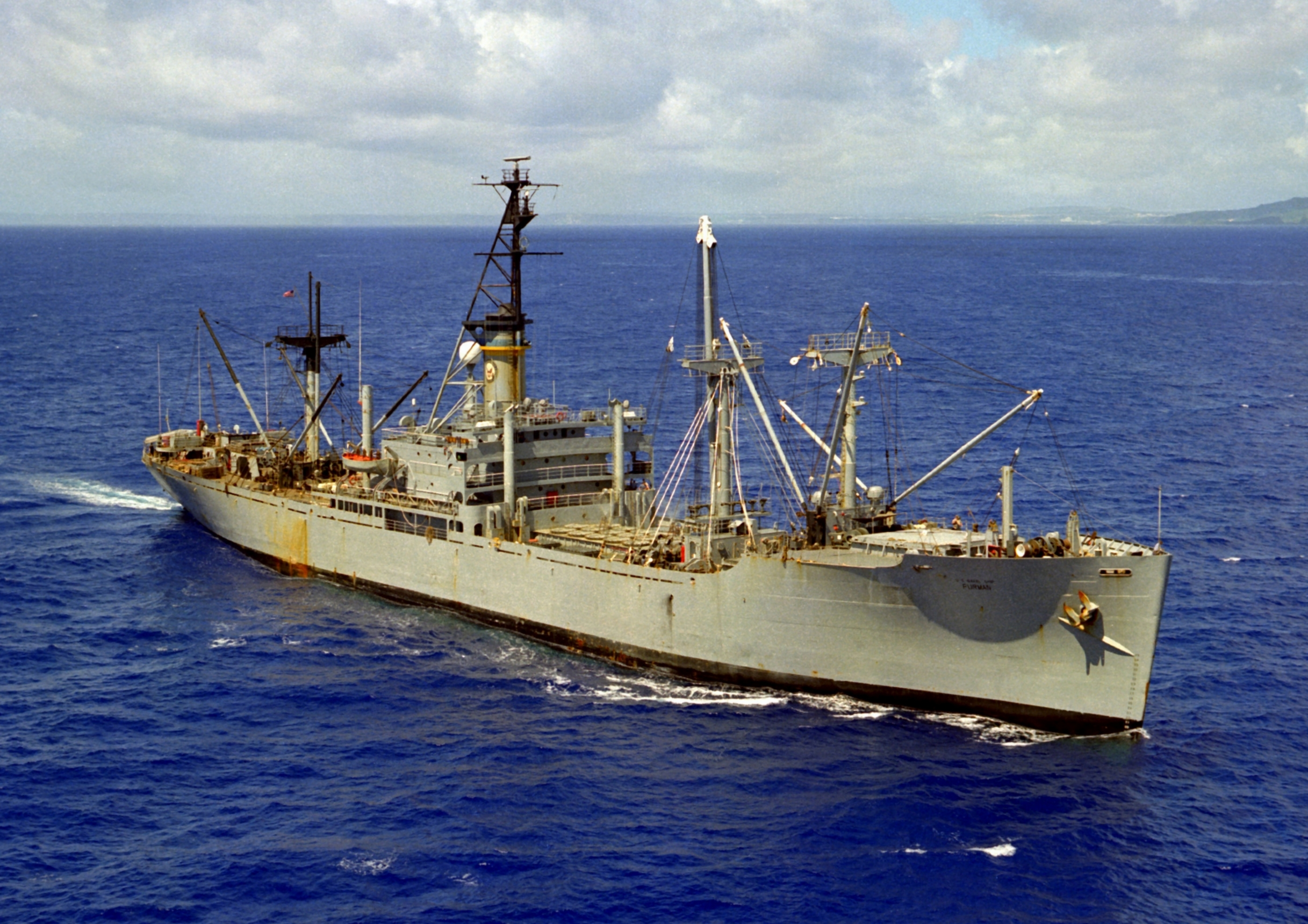
Victory ship

Olympic Steamship Company was founded in Seattle, Washington, on August 22, 1925, by John Ambler, Charles A. Wallace, and William W. Shorthill. The Olympic Steamship Company had routes that served the Pacific Northwest. The Olympic Steamship Company had a fleet of about 4 ships. The Olympic Steamship Company was named after The Olympic Mountains in the state of Washington. John Ambler was an attorney, and Charles A. Wallace previously worked at Fisher Flouring Mills Company. William W. Shorthill was a clerk at The Pacific Steamship Company. After the start of the company, Joseph L. Carman Jr., became vice president. Carman was previously president of Alaska Washington Airways. Olympic Steamship Company's first ship was an acquired 5,335-tonne tanker named the SS Dayton. Olympic Steamship Company renamed the Dayton the SS Olympic. The SS Olympic was built in 1907 as the Harport in South Shields, England. In 1936, Olympic Steamship Company entered into a joint venture with James Griffiths & Sons, Inc., as the Consolidated Olympic Company. The Consolidated Olympic Company offered a Long Beach, California, Seattle, and Tacoma, Washington, route on the Consolidated Olympic Line. The Consolidated Olympic Line was later renamed the Olympic-Griffiths Line. The Olympic-Griffiths Line acquired the 7,216-tonne cargo ship SS Olympic Pioneer, which was used on Pacific Northwest lumber and newsprint routes. The SS Olympic Pioneer also made two long voyages on the world trade route. The SS Olympic Pioneer then moved to a route from Puget Sound to Japan, moving US Army supplies. Olympic-Griffiths Line chartered ships for the other routes on the line. Ernest Clayton became president of the firm in 1940. Ernest Clayton previously worked for the McCormick Steamship Company. The Olympic Steamship Company was active in supporting the World War II effort.

== Salmon Terminals ==
Salmon Terminals was founded in 1929 as a cooperative warehouse that canned and labelled salmon. The Puckett Company, founded by Jim and Roy Puckett in 1915, provided the labelling for the canned salmon in Puget sound's many canneries. In 1929, 17 Alaska canneries founded the Salmon Terminals cooperative in the Puget Sound to unload, warehouse, can, label, and distribute canned salmon. The Puckett Company continued to provide the labelling service to Salmon Terminals until 1973. Salmon Terminals was sold to the Olympic Steamship Company in 1966. In 1966, Salmon Terminals operated from a warehouse in West Seattle, next to Pier 5. In 1983, the warehouse moved from West Seattle to Kent, WA. Olympic Steamship Company's Salmon Terminals division was sold on July 1, 1987, and the new owner founded the firm, Salmon Terminals, Inc., and moved to a new headquarters in Kent. In 2006, Salmon Terminals moved to a new warehouse outside of Auburn, Washington. Salmon Terminals is now a general logistics, shipping, distribution, warehouse, and contract packaging firm.

== World War II ==
The Olympic Steamship Company's fleet of ships was used to help the World War II effort. During World War II, the Olympic Steamship Company operated merchant navy ships for the United States Shipping Board. During World War II, Olympic Steamship Company was active in charter shipping with the Maritime Commission and War Shipping Administration. Olympic Steamship Company operated Liberty ships and Victory ships for the merchant navy. The ship was run by its Olympic Steamship Company crew, and the US Navy supplied United States Navy Armed Guards to man the deck guns and radio.

== Ships ==
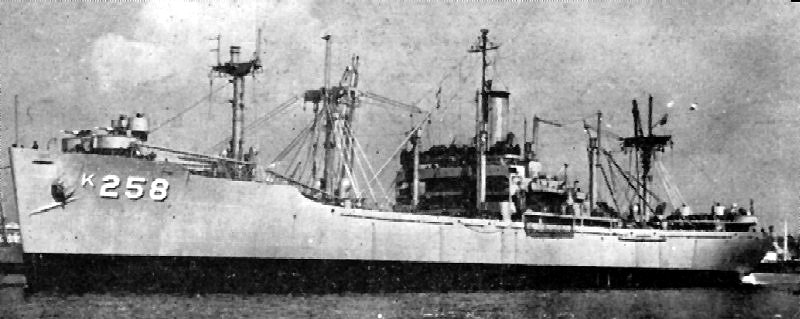
A Victory ship of World War II

Liberty ship of World War II

  - Ships:
- SS Olympic, built as Harport in 1907, owned from 1925 to 1940. Sank Jan. 22, 1942.
- SS Olympic Pioneer, was Liberty ship SS James A. Drain, built in 1944, owned from 1947 to 1962.
  - Ships operated by Olympic Steamship Company:
  - World War II Victory ships:
- SS Knox Victory
- SS Yale Victory
- Clarksburg Victory
  - World War II Liberty ships:
- SS Seton Hall Victory
- SS Carl G. Barth
- SS Mesa Victory
- SS Samuel L. Cobb
  - Other
- Trio, tanker ship
  - Korean War ship:
- SS Ethiopia Victory
  - Vietnam War ship:
- SS Ocala Victory

== See also ==
- World War II United States Merchant Navy
