= Thomas Kershaw (disambiguation) =

Thomas Kershaw (1819–1898) was a British pioneer of marbleizing.

Thomas Kershaw may also refer to:

- Thomas A. Kershaw, owner of the Cheers Beacon Hill bar in Boston
- Thomas Herbert Kershaw (1851–1913), British barrister and Attorney General of the Straits Settlements
