= USNS Huntsville =

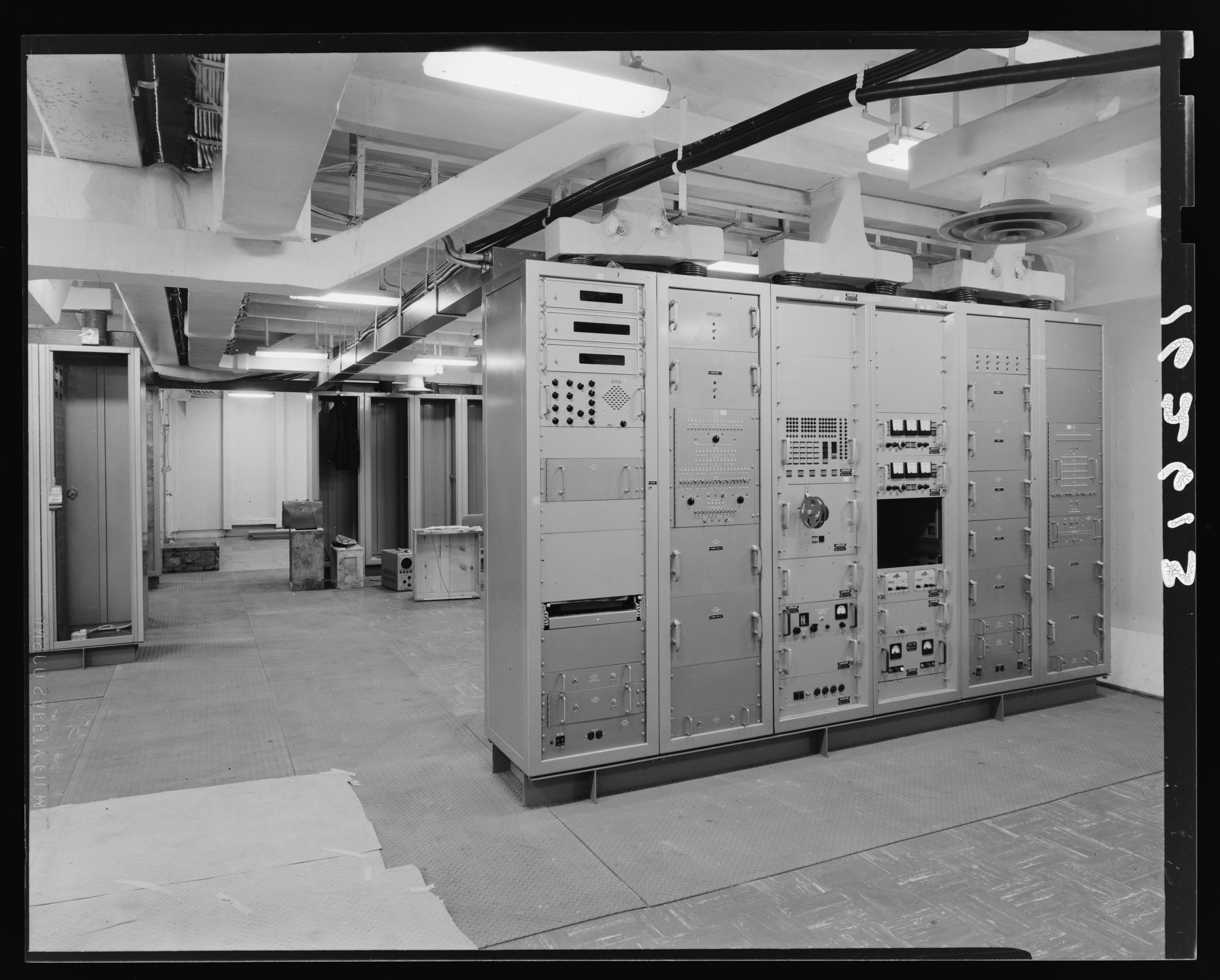
- Interior

History

United States
- Name: Knox Victory; Huntsville
- Namesake: Knox College; Cities of Huntsville, Alabama, and Huntsville, Texas
- Builder: Oregon Shipbuilding Corporation, Portland, Oregon
- Laid down: 2 March 1945 as SS Knox Victory, Victory Ship type (VC2-S-AP3) hull
- Launched: 13 April 1945
- Sponsored by: Mrs. Charles B. Gilbert
- Acquired: by the Navy, 11 August 1960
- In service: 1961
- Out of service: date unknown
- Renamed: USNS Huntsville (T-AGM-7) in 1960/1961
- Refit: as a Missile range instrumentation ship at Triple "A" Machine Shop, Inc., San Francisco, California
- Stricken: 8 November 1974
- Fate: Sold by MARAD, 17 July 1995

General characteristics
- Class & type: Victory ship type VC2-S-AP2, standard; Watertown-class missile range instrumentation ship
- Tonnage: 10,750 DWT; 7,612 GRT
- Displacement: 15,200 long tons (15,444 t) (standard)
- Length: 455 feet 3 inches (139 m) oa; 436 feet 6 inches (133 m) pp; 444 feet (135 m) lwl
- Beam: 62 feet (19 m)
- Draft: 28 ft (8.5 m)
- Installed power: 2 × Oil fired boilers; 6,000 hp (4,500 kW)
- Propulsion: 2 × steam turbines; 1 × screw propeller
- Speed: 15 knots (28 km/h; 17 mph)
- Capacity: 523,740 cubic feet (14,831 m^{3}) (grain); 453,210 cubic feet (12,833 m^{3}) (bale)
- Complement: 38–62 USMM; 21–40 USNAG
- Armament: Varied by ship; Bow-mounted 3 inches (76 mm)/50 caliber gun; Stern-mounted 5 inches (127 mm)/50 caliber gun; 8 × single 20 millimeters (0.79 in) Oerlikon anti-aircraft (AA) cannons and/or,

USNS Huntsville (T-AGM-7) was a Watertown-class missile range instrumentation ship acquired by the United States Navy in 1960 and converted from the SS Knox Victory Victory ship cargo configuration to a missile tracking ship, a role she retained for a number of years before being struck from the Navy List in 1974.

== Victory ship constructed in Oregon ==
The second ship to be so named by the Navy, Huntsville was laid down under U.S. Maritime Commission contract as Knox Victory by Oregon Shipbuilding Corporation, Portland, Oregon, 2 March 1945; launched 13 April 1945; sponsored by Mrs. Charles B. Gilbert; and delivered to the War Shipping Administration (WSA) 11 May 1945 for charter operated by Olympic Steamship Company.

== World War II-related service ==
During the remainder of the war she operated as a merchant ship under charter to Olympic Steamship Company, and she continued merchant service under bareboat charters from the Maritime Commission and the Maritime Administration until 1958 when she entered the National Defense Reserve Fleet at Olympia, Washington.

== Conversion to missile tracking ship ==
Knox Victory was acquired by the Navy from the Maritime Administration 11 August 1960 and assigned to the Military Sea Transportation Service (MSTS). She was renamed Huntsville and designated T-AGM-7, a missile range instrumentation ship, 27 November.

After conversion to a special projects ship by Triple "A" Machine Shop, Inc., San Francisco, California, Huntsville began duty as a range tracking ship in 1961.

Crewed by civilians, Huntsville operated out of Port Hueneme, California, and Honolulu, Hawaii, while assigned to special duties in the Pacific Ocean. During the next 4 years she made intermittent "on station" patrols in the Central Pacific, extending from the coast of Mexico to Wake Island and the Marshall Islands. She continued these patrols, which contributed mightily on America's space programs, until the spring of 1965; then she entered Avondale Shipyards, Inc., Westwego, Louisiana, 2 June 1965 for conversion, completed 30 October 1966.

Two other ships were reconfigured in to this new class, Watertown-class missile range instrumentation ship, the USNS Watertown (T-AGM-6) and the USNS Wheeling (T-AGM-8).

== 1966 upgrade ==
In June 1967 Huntsville returned to the Pacific, where she operated with Watertown (T-AGM-6). As an improved sea-based tracking station, she provided an important link in communications during the scheduled "Apollo" moon shots, which were designed to send American astronauts to the moon and back.

== Final Mission and Inactivation ==
One of the last missions for the Huntsville was in support of US surveillance of nuclear testing in the South Pacific. Huntsville spent approximately 90 days between June and September 1974 on that mission, most of it in the vicinity of Mururoa Atoll.

The following paragraph appeared in the Stanford Research Institute Alumni Newsletter in 2010 in an article by Walter Jaye entitled Adventures at Sea in the South Pacific.

"The Conclusion of the Missions:

In 1974, the third and final year of these operations, the ship used was the USNS Huntsville (see photo). The use of helicopters was dropped, and instead remotely piloted vehicles were launched from the Huntsville."

Huntsville was placed out of service on an unknown date, and was struck from the Navy List on 8 November 1974. She was placed in the National Defense Reserve Fleet and eventually sold by MARAD on 17 July 1995. Her subsequent fate is not known.
