= Joseph Franklin Kershaw =

British painter

- Born: 2 May 1884; Oldham, England
- Died: 14 October 1917 (aged 33); Passchendaele, Belgium
- Occupation: Artist
- Years active: 1908–1917

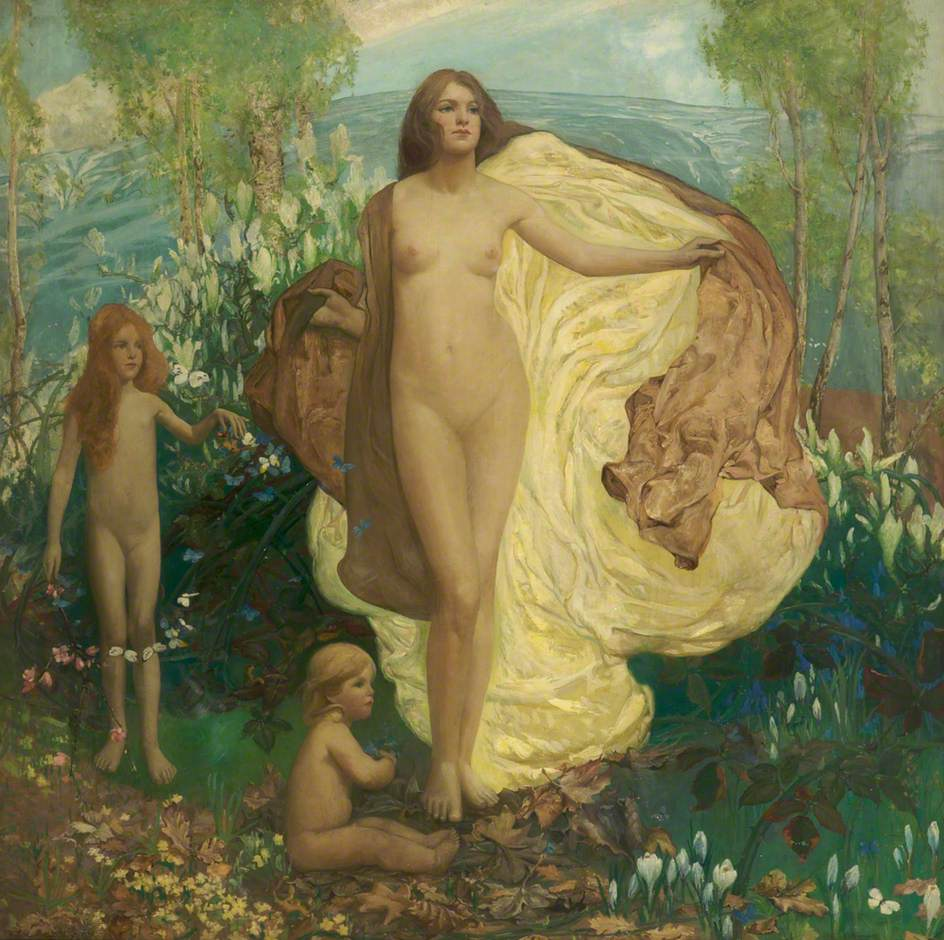
Renaissance of Spring, 1911, oils, ex. RCA 1911

Joseph Franklin Kershaw (2 May 1884 – 14 October 1917) was an English artist, who studied at the Royal College of Art and painted in watercolours and oils. His career was cut short by his death in action in World War 1.

== Biography ==
=== Life ===
J Franklin Kershaw was born in Oldham in 1884, the son of an ironmonger. He was educated at Oldham Technical School, and went on to study for four years at the Royal College of Art in Kensington, London. In 1907, he married Effie Gregory, the daughter of sculptor Thomas Gregory and herself an art teacher. They lived in Fulham while Kershaw studied, and then moved to Milnthorpe in Cumbria.

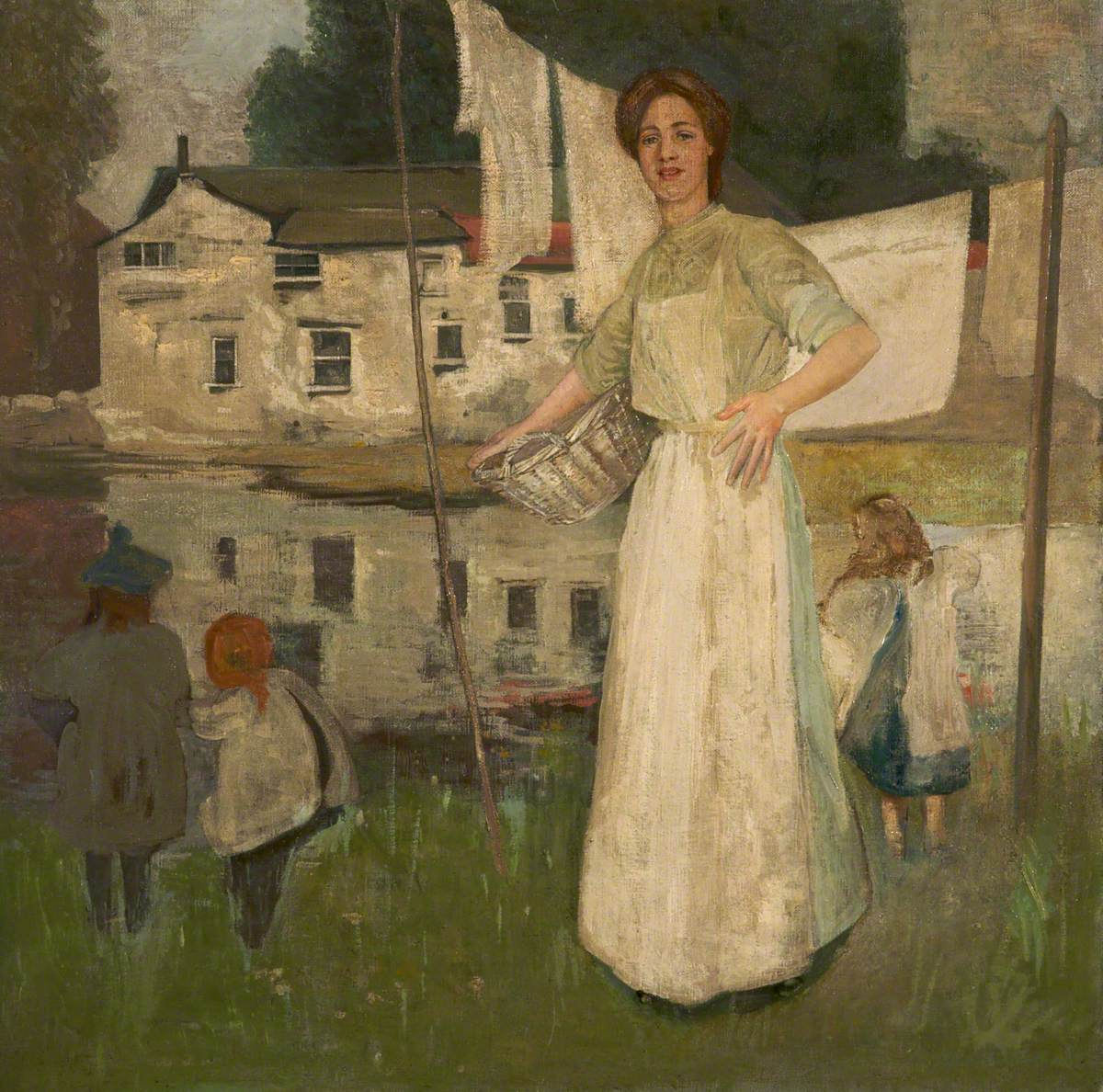
Washing Day, oils

He was a member of the Lake Artists' Society, an organisation which exhibited the work of local Lakeland artists.

=== World War I and Death ===
In June 1916, Kershaw enlisted into the Border Regiment of the British Army, and in August was transferred to 126th Company, Machine Gun Corps. He was posted to France, and following a short period of convalescence from a shell wound to his shoulder, returned to his company but was killed in action during the First Battle of Passchendaele. He is buried in Coxyde Military Cemetery, Belgium.

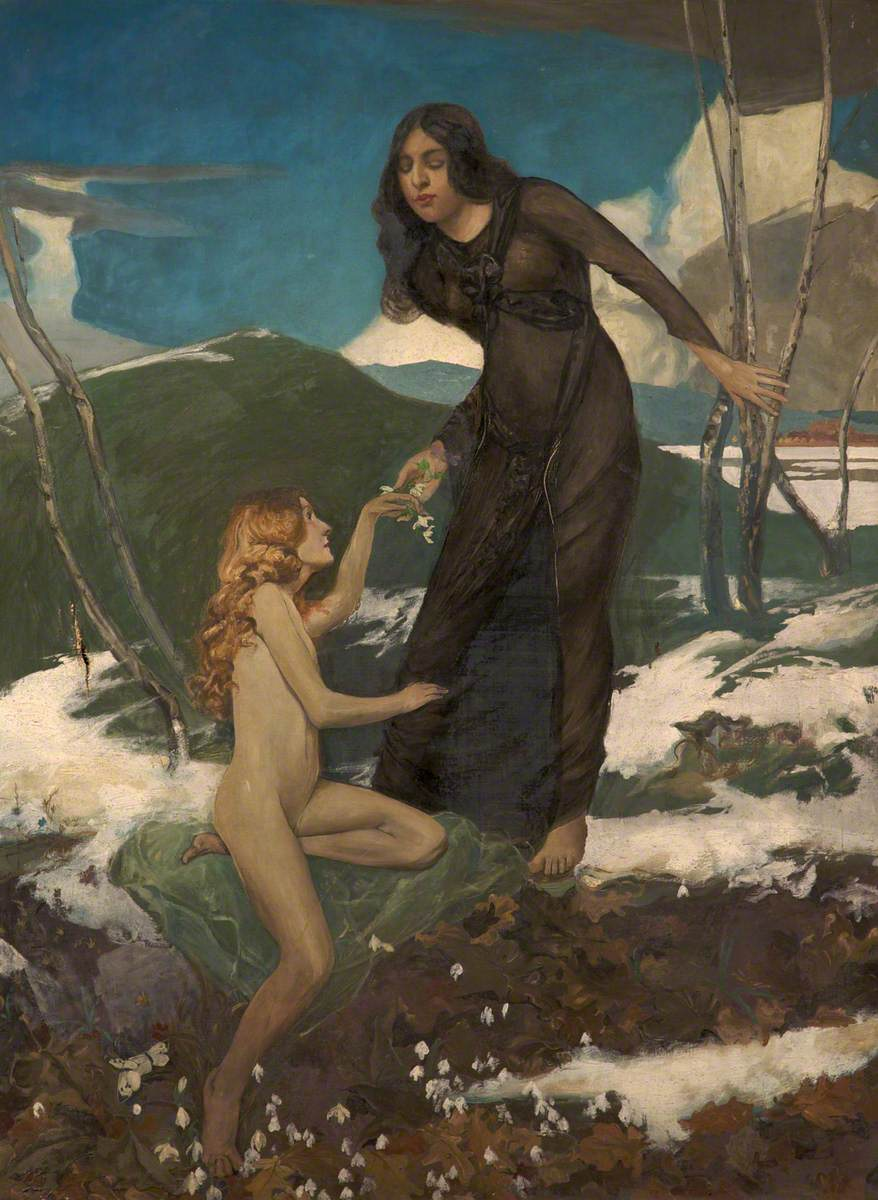
The Meeting of Spring and Winter, oil, ex. RCA 1912

== Work ==
Following his death, Oldham's Municipal Art Gallery held an exhibition of around 70 of Kershaw's paintings. The majority were watercolours, but also included were oil paintings from his days at the Royal College of Art.

Kershaw's watercolours were mainly of local scenes in the area surrounding his Lakeland home. But his most of his oil paintings show allegorical scenes depicting female nudes in natural settings, although Washing Day is realist in style. His The Three Graces is much reproduced, although the nude models are alarmingly young for modern curators.

An oil painting by Kershaw was included in three Royal College of Art exhibitions: 'The Renaissance of Spring' (1911), 'The Meeting of Spring and Winter' (1912) and 'The Passing of Spring' (1914).

His painting style owes something to the British Impressionists of the late 19th century. Contemporary journalists remarked on the similarity between some of Kershaw's works and those of fellow Oldham artist William Stott.

Four of his oil paintings can be seen online at Art UK, including the RCA exhibits 'The Renaissance of Spring' and 'The Meeting of Spring and Winter'. Three of these paintings are in the collection in Kershaw's home town at Gallery Oldham. A nude Flora fetched £1,000 at Christie's in 2008.

== Awards and distinctions ==
JF Kershaw was granted a British Institution award in painting in 1908, which had an annual value of £50 for two years. He was awarded a diploma from the Royal College of Art in 1912.
