= USS Kershaw =

1944 Haskell-class attack transport

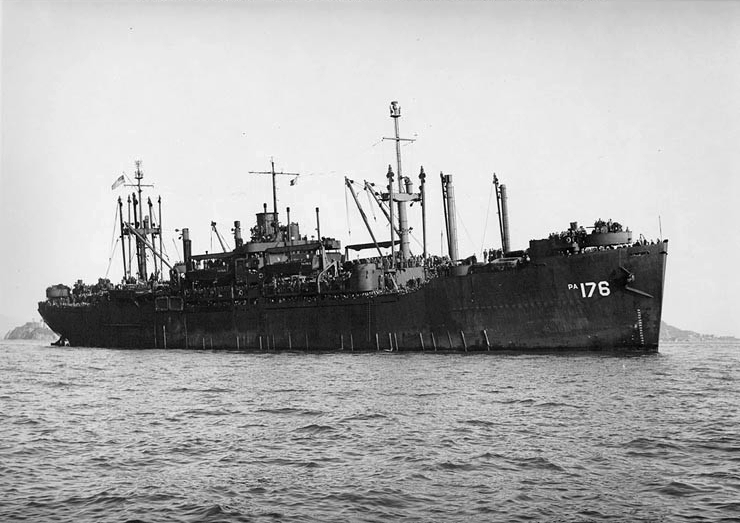
- Kershaw in San Francisco Bay, in late 1945 or early 1946

History

United States
- Name: USS Kershaw
- Namesake: Kershaw County, South Carolina
- Ordered: as type VC2-S-AP5
- Laid down: date unknown
- Launched: 12 November 1944
- Commissioned: 2 December 1944
- Decommissioned: 20 December 1946
- Stricken: 1 October 1958
- Fate: Scrapped, 1982

General characteristics
- Displacement: 12,450 tons (full load)
- Length: 455 ft 0 in (138.68 m)
- Beam: 62 ft 0 in (18.90 m)
- Draught: 24 ft 0 in (7.32 m)
- Speed: 19 knots
- Capacity: 150,000 cu. ft, 2,900 tons
- Complement: 56 Officers 480 Enlisted
- Armament: one 5 in (130 mm) gun mount, twelve 40 mm gun mounts, ten 20 mm gun mounts

USS Kershaw (APA-176) was a Haskell-class attack transport in service with the United States Navy from 1944 to 1946. She was scrapped in 1982.

== History ==
Kershaw was launched 12 November 1944, by the Oregon Shipbuilding Corp., Portland, Oregon; sponsored by Miss Helen Molloy; and commissioned 2 December 1944.

=== World War II ===
After shakedown, Kershaw cleared San Francisco, California, 7 February 1945, with nurses and naval personnel, arriving Guam 23 February. Moving to Saipan 27 February, the transport prepared for the invasion of the Ryukyus, the last enemy stronghold before Japan itself. During March she loaded equipment and troops of the 2d Marine Division; then, following amphibious exercises off Tinian, she sailed for the assault area 27 March.

The invasion got underway as the troops hit the beach at Okinawa 1 April. She returned Saipan 14 April, remaining there until sailing for the Solomons 5 June. Following brief stops at Tulagi, Espiritu Santo, and Eniwetok, she arrived Guam 14 July.

Following a short overhaul period at San Francisco, California, the transport loaded cargo and troops to replace veterans in the occupation area. She cleared San Francisco 17 August and steamed into Tacloban, Leyte, 10 September. From there she ferried occupation troops to Honshū, Japan, before returning to San Pedro, Los Angeles, 19 October. On the third of four additional Operation Magic Carpet cruises to the Far East, Kershaw delivered equipment to Bikini Atoll for the atomic tests before sailing on to Samar to embark another 2,000 veterans for return to San Francisco 25 May. On her final cruise she took on units of the 2d Marines at Sasebo before transiting the Panama Canal and arriving Norfolk, Virginia, 8 August.

=== Decommissioning and fate ===
Kershaw remained at Portsmouth, Virginia, until she decommissioned 20 December 1946, and entered the Atlantic Reserve Fleet at Norfolk. Struck from the Navy List 1 October 1958, she joined the National Defense Reserve Fleet 19 December 1958 and was berthed in James River, Virginia. She was sold for scrapping in 1982.

== Awards ==
Kershaw received one battle star for World War II service.
