= 1992 United States presidential election in Massachusetts =

- November 3, 1992
- Turnout: 84.22% (▲2.09%)

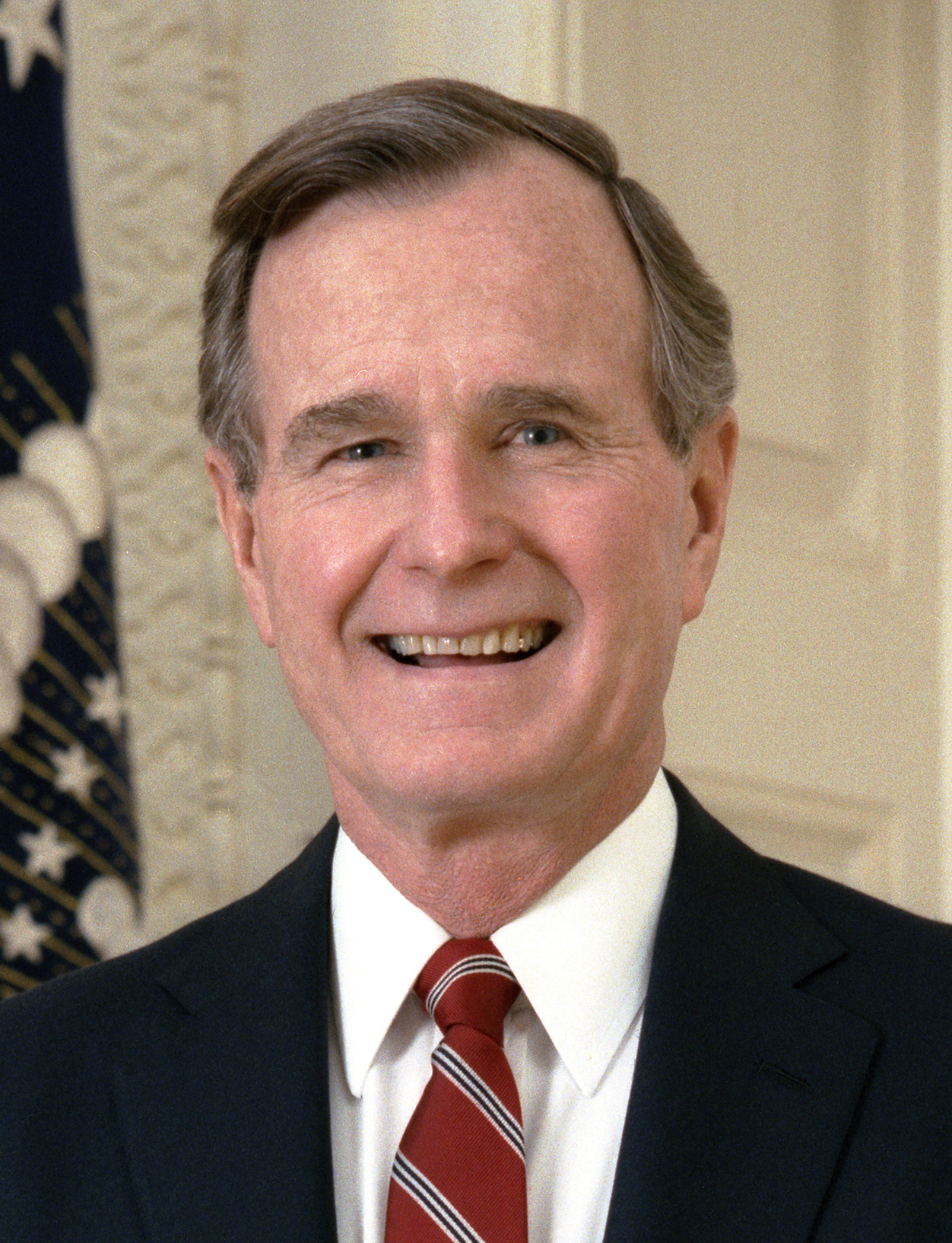

| Nominee | Bill Clinton | George H. W. Bush | Ross Perot |
| Party | Democratic | Republican | Independent |
| Home state | Arkansas | Texas | Texas |
| Running mate | Al Gore | Dan Quayle | James Stockdale |
| Electoral vote | 12 | 0 | 0 |
| Popular vote | 1,318,662 | 805,049 | 632,312 |
| Percentage | 47.54% | 29.03% | 22.80% |

Clinton
30–40%
40–50%
50–60%
60–70%
70–80%
Bush
30–40%
40–50%
Perot
30–40%
40–50%
President before election
George H. W. Bush
Republican
Elected President
Bill Clinton
Democratic

The 1992 United States presidential election in Massachusetts took place on November 3, 1992, as part of the 1992 United States presidential election. Voters chose 12 representatives, or electors to the Electoral College, who voted for president and vice president.

Massachusetts was won by Democratic Governor Bill Clinton of Arkansas with 47.54% of the popular vote over incumbent Republican President George H. W. Bush of Texas with 29.03%. Independent businessman Ross Perot of Texas finished in third, with 22.80% of the popular vote. Clinton thus defeated Bush in the state with a margin of 18.51%.

Massachusetts weighed in as a solid 13% more Democratic than the national average in 1992.

Bush failed to carry a single county in the state, the state where he was born, and his 29.03% of the vote was the smallest vote share a Republican presidential candidate had received in Massachusetts since 1964.

Clinton's decisive win in Massachusetts solidified the state's status in the modern era as a solid blue state. Massachusetts had been a Democratic-leaning state since 1928, and a Democratic stronghold since 1960. In 1972, Massachusetts was the only state in the nation to vote for Democrat George McGovern over Republican Richard Nixon in his 49-state landslide. However the state had trended Republican in the 1980s, with Ronald Reagan narrowly winning the state and George H. W. Bush taking a solid 45% and winning 3 counties in 1988. In 1992, Clinton not only carried the state by a double-digit margin, leaving Bush with less than 30% of the vote, but Clinton also swept every county in the state, as secular liberal New England rejected an increasingly Southern and conservative Republican Party dominated by Evangelical Christians. Since then, every Democratic presidential candidate that followed has carried the state by double-digit margins and won all 14 counties in Massachusetts.

As of 2023, this is the last time that the town of Berlin voted Republican and the last time that the towns of Erving, Peru, and Savoy did not vote Democratic in a presidential election.

== Results ==
1992 United States presidential election in Massachusetts
| Party | Candidate | Votes | Percentage | Electoral votes |
|---|---|---|---|---|
| Democratic | Bill Clinton | 1,318,662 | 47.54% | 12 |
| Republican | George H. W. Bush (incumbent) | 805,049 | 29.03% | 0 |
| Independent | Ross Perot | 632,312 | 22.80% | 0 |
| Libertarian | Andre Marrou | 7,458 | 0.27% | 0 |
| New Alliance | Lenora Fulani | 3,172 | 0.11% | 0 |
| Independent Voters (a) | Howard Phillips | 2,217 | 0.08% | 0 |
| Independent | Others (Write-In) | 1,870 | 0.07% | 0 |
| Natural Law | Dr. John Hagelin | 1,812 | 0.07% | 0 |
| Democrats for Economic Recovery | Lyndon LaRouche | 1,007 | 0.04% | 0 |
| Socialist | J. Quinn Brisben (Write-In) | 13 | <0.01% | 0 |
| Prohibition | Earl Dodge (Write-In) | 2 | <0.01% | 0 |
| Totals | | 2,773,574 | 100.0% | 12 |

(a) Howard Phillips was the candidate of the U.S. Taxpayers' Party nationally.

=== Results by county ===
| County | Bill Clinton Democratic | | George H.W. Bush Republican | | Various candidates Other parties | | Margin | | Total votes cast |
| County | # | % | # | % | # | % | # | % | Total votes cast |
|---|---|---|---|---|---|---|---|---|---|
| Barnstable | 46,641 | 42.79% | 33,916 | 31.12% | 28,440 | 26.09% | 12,725 | 11.67% | 108,997 |
| Berkshire | 36,857 | 54.40% | 14,726 | 21.74% | 16,163 | 23.86% | 22,131 | 32.66% | 67,746 |
| Bristol | 102,406 | 48.36% | 52,370 | 24.73% | 56,978 | 26.91% | 50,036 | 23.63% | 211,754 |
| Dukes | 4,292 | 54.41% | 1,827 | 23.16% | 1,769 | 22.43% | 2,465 | 31.25% | 7,888 |
| Essex | 140,593 | 43.62% | 102,212 | 31.71% | 79,523 | 24.67% | 38,381 | 11.91% | 322,328 |
| Franklin | 17,246 | 48.14% | 8,691 | 24.26% | 9,890 | 27.60% | 8,555 | 23.88% | 35,827 |
| Hampden | 86,026 | 45.69% | 54,621 | 29.01% | 47,618 | 25.30% | 31,405 | 16.68% | 188,265 |
| Hampshire | 37,879 | 54.06% | 15,694 | 22.40% | 16,498 | 23.54% | 22,185 | 31.66% | 70,071 |
| Middlesex | 343,994 | 49.89% | 193,703 | 28.10% | 151,756 | 22.01% | 150,291 | 21.79% | 689,453 |
| Nantucket | 2,037 | 48.32% | 1,158 | 27.47% | 1,021 | 24.21% | 879 | 20.85% | 4,216 |
| Norfolk | 150,488 | 46.41% | 103,255 | 31.84% | 70,521 | 21.75% | 47,233 | 14.57% | 324,264 |
| Plymouth | 79,160 | 38.11% | 69,514 | 33.47% | 59,036 | 28.42% | 9,646 | 4.64% | 207,710 |
| Suffolk | 132,921 | 60.62% | 51,378 | 23.43% | 34,974 | 15.95% | 81,543 | 37.19% | 219,273 |
| Worcester | 138,122 | 43.74% | 101,984 | 32.30% | 75,676 | 23.96% | 36,138 | 11.44% | 315,782 |
| Totals | 1,318,662 | 47.54% | 805,049 | 29.03% | 649,863 | 23.43% | 513,613 | 18.51% | 2,773,574 |

Counties that flipped from Republican to Democratic

- Barnstable
- Plymouth
- Worcester

=== Results by congressional district ===
Clinton won all 10 congressional districts, including two that elected Republicans.

| District | Bush | Clinton | Perot | Representative |
|---|---|---|---|---|
| 1st | 27% | 48% | 25% | John Olver |
| 2nd | 29% | 46% | 25% | Richard Neal |
| 3rd | 31% | 45% | 23% | Joseph D. Early |
| 3rd | 31% | 45% | 23% | Peter I. Blute |
| 4th | 26% | 51% | 22% | Barney Frank |
| 5th | 32% | 42% | 26% | Chester G. Atkins |
| 5th | 32% | 42% | 26% | Marty Meehan |
| 6th | 31% | 44% | 25% | Nicholas Mavroules |
| 6th | 31% | 44% | 25% | Peter G. Torkildsen |
| 7th | 29% | 50% | 21% | Ed Markey |
| 8th | 19% | 67% | 13% | Joseph P. Kennedy II |
| 9th | 31% | 48% | 21% | Joe Moakley |
| 10th | 32% | 42% | 25% | Gerry Studds |

== See also ==
- United States presidential elections in Massachusetts
