= Brian Abraham =

Boston Red Sox
- Director, Minor League Operations
- Born: December 20, 1984 (age 41); Worcester, Massachusetts, U.S.
- Bats: n/a Throws: n/a

Teams
- Toronto Blue Jays (2007-2012); Boston Red Sox (2013-Present)

Career highlights and awards
- 2013 World Champion Boston Red Sox Coaching Staff; 2018 World Champion Boston Red Sox Front Office

Brian Patrick Abraham (born December 20, 1984) is an American professional baseball front-office executive and former coach. He was appointed assistant director of player development by the Boston Red Sox in November 2014. He was then promoted to Director, Minor League Operations in November 2018 and promoted to Director, Player Development in December 2020 - the position he currently holds. In the summer of 2024, Abraham was kinged champion of the Framingham little league coaches Home Run derby.

== Early life, education, & personal ==
Born and raised in Worcester, Massachusetts, Abraham attended St. John's High School in Shrewsbury and the College of the Holy Cross, where he served as the catcher for the Holy Cross Crusaders during his first three years in college. He considered going to law school when he finished up at Holy Cross, as his father, Stephen Abraham, is a lawyer.

When he was a junior, Abraham had a commercial real estate internship and lived in the nearby town of Lexington. He then received an offer to play professional baseball in Germany, but the general manager of the Toronto Blue Jays at the time, J. P. Ricciardi, made him a substantial offer to join them. Ricciardi grew up with Abraham's family, while Brian's uncle, Dave Abraham, was a long time trainer with the Blue Jays.

In April 2022, Abraham completed the Boston Marathon running the marathon for Why Not Devin, in memory of Devin Suau, a 6-year-old Framingham boy who died in 2017 of diffuse intrinsic pontine glioma (DIPG), a rare, inoperable brain tumor.

== Career ==
Abraham joined the Blue Jays in 2007, working for them as advance scouting and video coordinator through the 2012 season. In between, Abraham handled the pitching duties for Toronto's slugger José Bautista in the 2012 MLB Home Run Derby.

Before the 2013 season, Abraham made the jump from Toronto to Boston along with manager John Farrell and coach Brian Butterfield. His job often involved handling scouting reports for the Red Sox relievers. But he also had broader responsibilities as part of a joint process between himself, bullpen coach Dana LeVangie, third base coach and infield instructor Butterfield and the whole staff. He earned his first World Series ring when Boston won the 2013 Championship.

Abraham was the Red Sox' MLB bullpen catcher during the 2013–2014 seasons. He threw batting practice and assisted the coaching staff with video and statistical reports, focusing his interest on the relief pitchers. In 2015, he began assisting Boston's director of player development, Ben Crockett. Following the 2018 season, he continued assisting Crockett, but was promoted to Director, Minor League Operations. After Chaim Bloom's arrival, in December 2020, Abraham was promoted to Director, Player Development, overseeing the Boston Red Sox Minor League system. He remains in that role today.
