= Shrewsbury Historic District =

Shrewsbury Historic District may refer to:

- Shrewsbury Historic District (Shrewsbury, Massachusetts), listed on the National Register of Historic Places in Worcester County, Massachusetts
- Shrewsbury Historic District (Shrewsbury, New Jersey), listed on the National Register of Historic Places in Monmouth County, New Jersey
- Shrewsbury Historic District (Shrewsbury, Pennsylvania), listed on the National Register of Historic Places in York County, Pennsylvania
