= Shrewsbury crew =

The Shrewsbury Crew (Note: The term crew is commonly used in the United States of America for rowing) program at Shrewsbury High School in Shrewsbury, Massachusetts, was established in 1937 and is one of the oldest scholastic rowing programs in the United States. The women's program was started in 1975.

Their first coach was Ken Burns who was a very influential figure for rowing throughout the mid-20th century. Ken Burns was responsible for bringing the Eastern Sprints Regatta to Lake Quinsigamond in 1961, where it has been held ever since. Shrewsbury won three National Championships throughout the 1940s and 1950s. The Shrewsbury men's team attended its most recent National Championship in June 2008, where they finished 16th. They also attended the 2007 US Rowing Youth National Championship, where they finished 14th.

Shrewsbury is a full member of the New England Interscholastic Rowing Association (NEIRA) and was one of the founding schools of the NEIRA. The men's varsity 8 finished 5th in the Grand Final in the 2008 spring season, the boats best finish in several decades. They are also a full member of the Massachusetts Public Scholastic Rowing Association (MPSRA). Shrewsbury rows out of the Donahue Rowing Center on Lake Quinsigamond in Shrewsbury, MA.

The Donahue Rowing Center is the largest rowing-only facility in the United States and was in large part funded by Irving James Donahue and Barbara Grant Donahue. Jim Donahue was a member of National Championship Shrewsbury crews in the 1950s. Lake Quinsigamond plays host to many regattas every year including the Eastern Sprints, New England Collegiate Rowing Championships, and the New England Interscholastic Rowing Association (NEIRA) Championships.
