= Roberta Goldman =

American politician (born 1938)

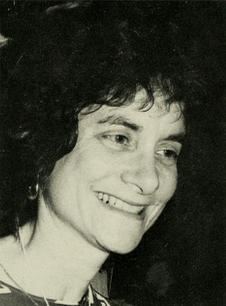
- Goldman, circa 1985

Member of the Massachusetts House of Representatives from the 11th Worcester district
- In office January 2, 1985 – January 6, 1987
- Succeeded by: Peter Blute

Personal details
- Born: March 30, 1938 (age 88) Cambridge, Massachusetts
- Party: Democratic

Roberta R. Goldman (born March 30, 1938 in Cambridge, Massachusetts) is an American politician who served one term in the Massachusetts House of Representatives.

== Biography ==
Goldman was born on March 30, 1938 in Cambridge, Massachusetts. She received her Bachelor of Arts and Master of Education from Boston University, and her Master of Arts in Special Education from Assumption College. Outside of being a politician, Goldman worked as a teacher in Shrewsbury, Massachusetts, where she served on the local Democratic Town Committee.

She was first elected to the Massachusetts House of Representatives in 1984, beating Republican Richard Aronovitz by 94 votes. She ran for re-election in 1986, but lost to Republican challenger Peter Blute.

In 2000, Goldman served as an elector from Massachusetts in the 2000 United States presidential election.

She is Jewish.
