= Shrewsbury High School =

Shrewsbury High School may refer to the following schools:

- Shrewsbury High School (Massachusetts), United States
- Shrewsbury High School, Shropshire, England
