= Hannah Kane =

Massachusetts politician

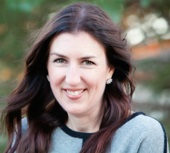

Member of the Massachusetts House of Representatives from the 11th Worcester district
- Incumbent
- Assumed office April 8, 2015
- Preceded by: Matt Beaton

Personal details
- Born: 1971 (age 54–55) Maine
- Party: Republican
- Education: Boston University (BA)

Hannah Kane is a State Representative who represents the 11th Worcester District in the Massachusetts House of Representatives. She represents the towns of Shrewsbury and Westborough. Kane serves as the Ranking Minority on the Joint Committee on Cannabis Policy and the Joint Committee on Public Health, and as a member on the House Committee on Ways and Means, and the Joint Committee on Ways and Means. She also serves as a Shrewsbury Town Meeting Member, and as president of the Shrewsbury Public Schools Foundation.

== Career ==
Kane graduated from Boston University's Questrom School of Business in 1993. She owns Beaton Kane Construction with her predecessor in the House, Matt Beaton. She previously worked at the insurance company Unum, and at the quasi-public state agency MassDevelopment, where she was the director of marketing and product development. Upon her return to the private sector, Kane worked in the field of consulting.

== Committee Assignments ==
For the 2025-26 Session, Kane sits on the following committees in the House:

- Ranking Minority, House Committee on Ethics
- Ranking Minority, Joint Committee on Health Care Financing
- Ranking Minority, Joint Committee on Public Health
- Ranking Minority, Joint Committee on State Administration and Regulatory Oversight
- House Committee on Steering, Policy and Scheduling

== Caucuses ==
Kane is involved in the following caucuses:

- Vice Chair, Massachusetts Caucus of Women Legislators
- Co-founder and co-chair, Food System Caucus
- Chair, Legislative Caucus on Cancer Awareness
- Co-chair, Massachusetts Caucus of American Irish State Legislators

== Task forces and commissions ==
Kane is involved in the following task forces and commissions:

- Member, Women's Rights History Trail Task Force
- Member, Massachusetts Food Policy Council
- Member, Commission on Malnutrition Prevention Among Older Adults
- Member, Massachusetts Commission on Unaccompanied Homeless Youth
- Member, Massachusetts-Ireland Trade Commission

== Personal life ==
She is married to James Kane, the former chairman of the Shrewsbury Board of Selectman, and current Town Moderator, and has three children. Kane resides in Shrewsbury.

== See also ==
- 2019–2020 Massachusetts legislature
- 2021–2022 Massachusetts legislature
