= Matthew Beaton =

American politician

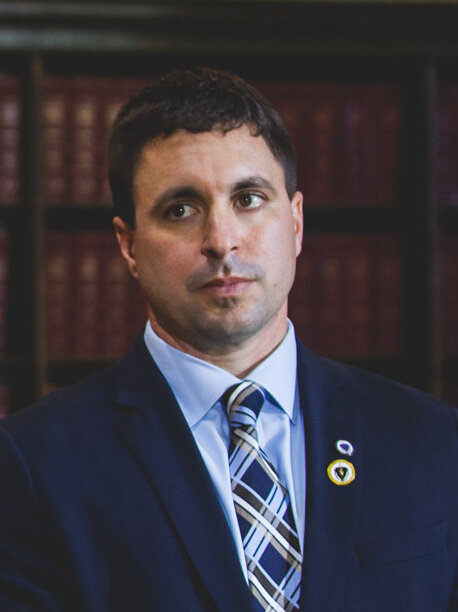
- Beaton in 2015

Massachusetts Secretary of Energy and Environmental Affairs
- In office January 8, 2015 – May 3, 2019
- Governor: Charlie Baker
- Preceded by: Maeve Vallely Bartlett
- Succeeded by: Kathleen Theoharides

Member of the Massachusetts House of Representatives from the 11th Worcester district
- In office 2011–2015
- Preceded by: Karyn Polito
- Succeeded by: Hannah Kane

Personal details
- Born: July 27, 1978 (age 48) Shrewsbury, Massachusetts
- Party: Republican
- Spouse: Laura Beaton
- Children: 3
- Education: Worcester Polytechnic Institute (B.S.); Boston University (M.S.)
- Occupation: Political figure
- Website: Massachusetts legislature website Campaign website

Matthew A. Beaton (born July 27, 1978) is an American political figure and business executive.

== Career ==
In May, 2019, he became senior vice president of renewable energy and emerging technology at TRC Companies. His most recent public office was serving as the Secretary of the Massachusetts Executive Office of Energy and Environmental Affairs from 2015 to 2019. He previously elected in the Massachusetts House of Representatives from 2011 to 2015. He is a Shrewsbury resident and a member of the Republican Party. Beaton graduated from St. John's High School in Shrewsbury in 1996. Beaton represented the United States in the 2001 World Rowing Championships in Lucerne, Switzerland in the men's lightweight double.
