= Andrew J. Olmsted =

American journalist

- Born: 1 February 1970; Bangor, Maine, U.S.
- Died: 3 January 2008 (aged 37); Diyala Governorate, Iraq
- Education: Clark University
- Military career
- Allegiance: United States
- Branch: United States Army
- Commands: Iraq War

Andrew J. Olmsted (1 February 1970 – 3 January 2008) was a major in the U.S. Army. He was born in Bangor, Maine, raised in Northborough, Massachusetts, and educated at St. John's High School in Shrewsbury, MA, and Clark University.

Olmsted was assigned to a battalion military transition team working with 5th Iraqi Army Division. He was killed in action by sniper fire while serving in the Iraq War. Also killed in the attack was Captain Thomas J. Casey. They were the first casualties suffered by the US Army in Iraq in 2008. Major Olmsted's funeral took place on 15 January 2008, at Fort Carson, Colorado.

His eleven-man team (Nightmare) likely suffered the most casualties of any transition team. Albert A. Haroutounian, an interpreter that worked with the team, was killed by a roadside bomb on 10 March 2008 in Diyala. Captain Ulises Burgos and Specialist Matthew Morris (who was loaned to the short-handed team by the 2-3 Armored Cavalry Regiment) were killed by a roadside bomb on 6 April 2008.

His team operated from Kirkush Military Training Base (KMTB) near FOB Caldwell. His team operated throughout the Diyala province in support of the Iraqi Army 5th Division. Units they supported were far flung. His team had to roam from KMTB west to Baqubah and FOB Warhorse east to Mandali and along the Iranian border to the far north of Diyala. They clocked thousands of kilometers along some of the most dangerous routes in Iraq.

He was known for writing the blog "From the Front Lines" for the Rocky Mountain News, and guest-posting at Obsidian Wings blog as G'Kar. He was killed in As Sadiyah, Iraq at the age of 37. His last blog entry was published posthumously on the Internet and in the Congressional Record.
