= Ski Ward =

Ski area in Shrewsbury, Massachusetts

Ski Ward Ski Area
- Interactive map of Ski Ward Ski Area
- Location: Shrewsbury, Massachusetts, US
- Nearest city: Worcester, Massachusetts
- Coordinates: 42°18′20″N 71°40′30″W
- Vertical: 220 ft (67 m)
- Trails: 9
- Lift system: 1 Triple chair, 5 Surface Lifts
- Snowmaking: 100%
- Website: Ski Ward Ski Area

Ski Ward Ski Area is a small ski area located in Shrewsbury, Massachusetts.

Ski Ward has nine trails covering a vertical drop of approximately 220 feet (67 m). The summit is served by a triple chairlift and T-bar, while the beginner area has a handle tow and carpet lift. There is a lodge with a bar and grill, restrooms, guest services, rental shop and ski patrol first aid room.

Ski Ward also has a tubing facility with 8 lanes serviced by 2 lifts.

Boston-area schools, including Wellesley High School and Westwood High School, hold their Ski Team practices at Ward and the hill hosts both practices and races on White Out almost every day of the week. Ski Ward has also hosted USASA Boardercross events, rail jams and terrain park competitions and a variety of other special events.

Summer activities include 4 tubing lanes and a dry slope terrain park on M-Snow surface, both served by the magic carpet.

Ski Ward has a Latitude 90 snow making machine and was the first lift serve skiing to open in North America in 2023 and 2024.

== History ==
The facility began operation in 1939, known as Ward Hill Ski Area (operated by the Ward family). It has been in continuous operation since that time. In 1990 John and Effy LaCroix purchased the area and began an extensive upgrade, including a snow-tubing slope, a triple chairlift, and improvements to the lighting, snowmaking and snow grooming equipment.

The truck which originally provided power for the rope tow is still visible, off to the right of the Triple.

=== Trails ===
- Beginner: 3
- Intermediate: 3
- Expert: 3

== Snowmaking ==
Ski Ward has 100% snowmaking coverage.
