= Saint John's High School (Massachusetts) =

American private high school

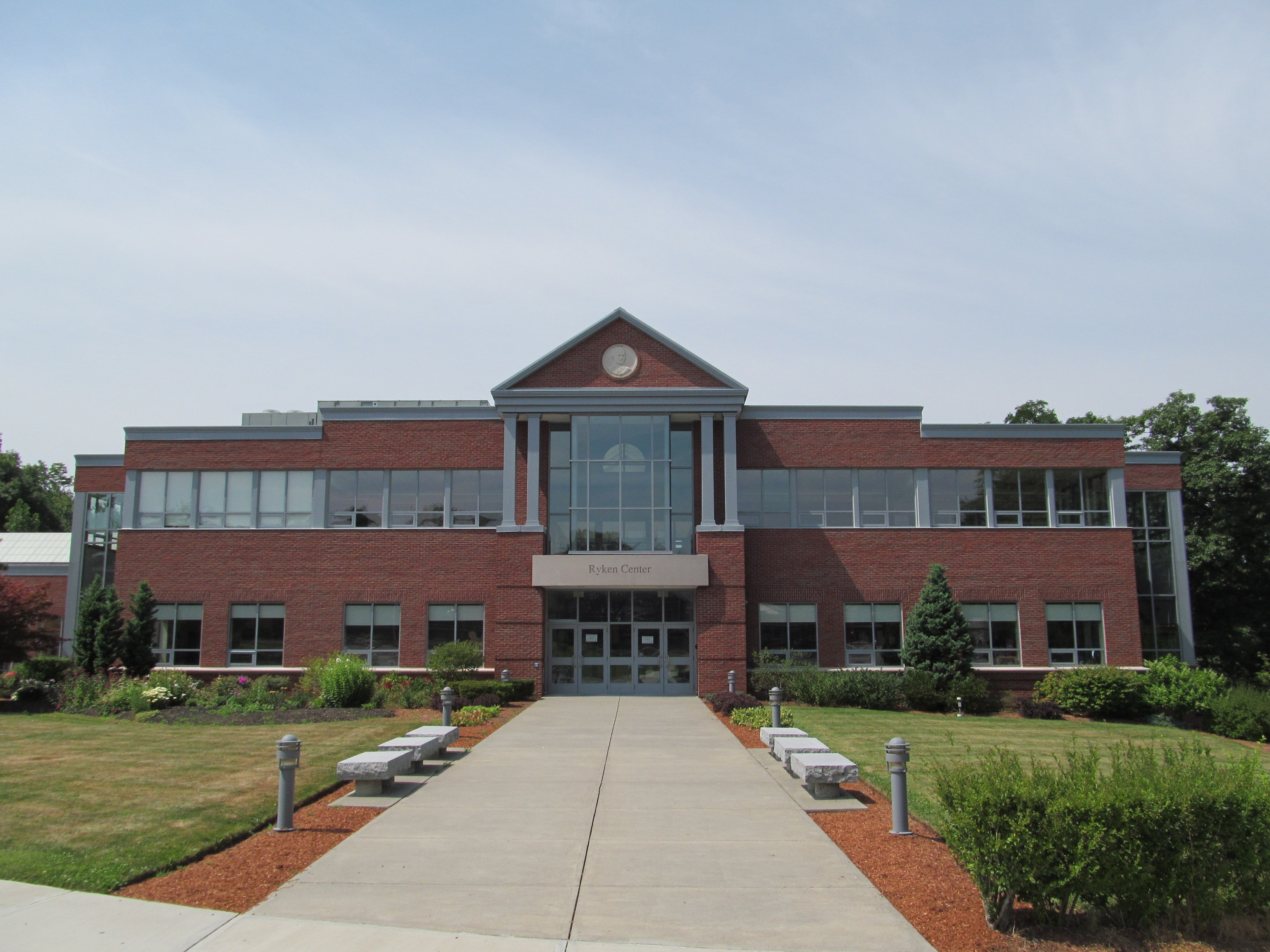
- Ryken Center

Location
- 378 Main Street; Shrewsbury, (Worcester), Massachusetts 01545-2299; United States; 42°17′33″N 71°43′45″W

Information
- Type: Private High school
- Motto: Latin: Concordia Res Parvae Crescunt (In Harmony Small Things Grow.)
- Religious affiliation: Xaverian Brothers
- Denomination: Roman Catholic
- Established: September 1898
- CEEB code: 222-515
- Head of school: Benjamin Horgan
- Teaching staff: 80
- Grades: 7-12
- Gender: Boys
- Campus: Suburban
- Campus size: 125 acres (0.51 km^{2})
- Colors: Red and White
- Athletics: 16 interscholastic sports
- Athletics conference: Catholic Conference (MIAA)
- Mascot: Pioneer
- Team name: Pioneers
- Rivals: St. John’s Prep (Danvers), Boston College High, Xaverian Brothers High, Catholic Memorial
- Accreditation: New England Association of Schools and Colleges
- Newspaper: The Red & White
- Tuition: $16,850.00
- Website: www.stjohnshigh.org

Saint John's High School is a private Catholic boys' high school located in Shrewsbury, Massachusetts. It is located in the Roman Catholic Diocese of Worcester. The school was founded and is currently sponsored by the Xaverian Brothers.

== History ==
The Xaverian Brothers' association with Worcester dates back to September 1893, when a pioneer community of four Xaverians arrived in the city to formally open Saint John's Parish Grammar School for Boys. In 1898 a three-year high school curriculum was introduced. A fourth, or senior year, was added in 1906, when the College of the Holy Cross dropped that institution's college prep or high school senior course to concentrate solely on college-level work.

In November 1953, John Cardinal Wright, who was then Bishop of Worcester, transferred the high school property under the new title of Saint John's Preparatory School of Worcester to the Xaverian Brothers. The school population in 1954 consisted of eleven Brothers and 354 students. The brothers purchased a large acre estate in neighboring Shrewsbury. This acquisition was the first step in the expansion of Saint John's to a regional high school serving all of Worcester County. In 1959, one hundred twenty-five acres at the foot of Main Street hill were purchased, and Pioneer Field came into being. In 1962, all classes had transferred to the Shrewsbury location. A gym and cafeteria were added in 1963 and 1964.

== 2019 Sexual abuse ==
In July 2019, Saint John's High School released a statement detailing six Xaverian Brothers, along with one from another order, who sexually abused underage school children—including two offenses on school grounds—and were employed by the school. These were detailed in a report compiled by a former FBI agent.

== Athletics ==
St. John's has 16 varsity men's sports. In the fall, they compete in football, soccer, golf, and cross country. They also have a club rowing team in the fall. In the winter, they compete in swimming, basketball, wrestling, hockey, alpine ski, and indoor track and field. In the spring, they compete in rowing, lacrosse, baseball, and outdoor track and field.

St. John's has had several alumni play professionally in the National Football League, National Hockey League, and Major League Baseball.

== Notable alumni ==
=== Politicians and government officials ===
- Matthew Beaton (1996) – former Massachusetts Secretary of Energy and Environmental Affairs
- Peter Blute (1974) – former member of the United States Congress
- John A. Durkin (1954) – former United States Senator from New Hampshire
- Joseph Early (1951) – former member of the United States Congress
- Dan Grabauskas (1981) – former CEO of the Honolulu Authority for Rapid Transportation and former general manager of the Massachusetts Bay Transportation Authority (MBTA)
- Steve Kerrigan (1989) – candidate for Lieutenant Governor of Massachusetts, 2012 CEO of Democratic National Convention, 2013 CEO of Presidential Inaugural Committee
- Tim Murray (1986) – former Lieutenant Governor of Massachusetts

=== Athletes ===
- Brian Abraham – bullpen catcher for the Red Sox and later player development director for the Red Sox
- John Andreoli (1978) – played for USFL Boston/New Orleans Breakers
- John Andreoli (2008) – former outfielder for the San Diego Padres, Seattle Mariners, and Baltimore Orioles
- Rob Blanchflower (2009) – tight end for Pittsburgh Steelers, 2014–15
- Pat Bourque (1965) – former first baseman for the Oakland Athletics, Chicago Cubs, and Minnesota Twins; 1973 World Series champion
- Sean Burke (2018) – starting pitcher for Chicago White Sox
- Ron Darling (1978) – broadcaster; former MLB All-Star pitcher for the New York Mets, Montreal Expos, and Oakland Athletics; Gold Glove winner, 1986 World Series champion, and inductee in the New York Mets Hall of Fame
- Rob Hennigan (2000) – basketball executive for the Oklahoma City Thunder and Orlando Magic
- Tim Lahey (2000) – Phantom ballplayer, was on the Philadelphia Phillies active roster, but never appeared in a game
- Tom Moore (1983) – Quinnipiac University head men's basketball coach, 2007–17
- Ryan O'Rourke (2006) – former pitcher for the Minnesota Twins and New York Mets
- Richard Rodgers (2011) – tight end for the Philadelphia Eagles, Green Bay Packers and Los Angeles Chargers with 15 career touchdowns in the NFL. On December 3, 2015, Rodgers caught the longest game-winning, game-ending Hail Mary in NFL history, according to the Elias Sports Bureau.
- Fran Quinn (1983) – PGA golfer
- Ian Seymour, pitcher for the Tampa Bay Rays
- Jim Stewart (1974) – former goaltender for the Boston Bruins
- Lance Zawadzki (2003) – former shortstop for the San Diego Padres; assistant hitting coach for the Detroit Tigers

=== Others ===
- Mike Birbiglia (attended for one year) – comedian, actor, and NPR contributor; wrote about his freshman year at St. John's in a book
- John Dufresne (1965) – author and university professor; winner of a Guggenheim Fellowship
- Jim Ford (2000) – Film and television actor, stuntman, screenwriter and film director
- Brett Murphy (2010) – child actor in Fever Pitch and journalist
- Frank O'Hara (1943) – Museum of Modern Art curator and poet
- Andrew J. Olmsted (1988) – U.S. Army major and blogger
- Charlie Pierce (1971) – sportswriter, political blogger, liberal pundit, author, and game show panelist
- Michael Ritchie (1975), artistic director, Los Angeles Center Theatre Group
- John F. Smith Jr. (1956) – former CEO/Chairman General Motors

== Notable faculty ==
- Fred Borchelt, former Olympic rower, silver medalist at the 1984 Summer Olympics
