= Joseph D. Early =

American politician (1933–2012)

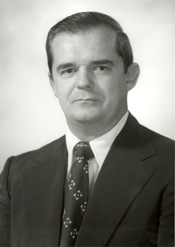

Member of the U.S. House of Representatives from Massachusetts's 3rd district
- In office January 3, 1975 – January 3, 1993
- Preceded by: Harold Donohue
- Succeeded by: Peter I. Blute

Member of the Massachusetts House of Representatives
- In office 1963–1974

Personal details
- Born: Joseph Daniel Early; January 31, 1933 Worcester, Massachusetts
- Died: November 9, 2012 (aged 79) Worcester, Massachusetts
- Resting place: Saint John's Cemetery, Worcester, Massachusetts
- Party: Democratic
- Spouse: Marilyn Powers Early
- Education: College of the Holy Cross (BS)
- Profession: teacher

Military service
- Allegiance: United States of America
- Branch/service: United States Navy
- Years of service: 1955–1957

Joseph Daniel Early (January 31, 1933 – November 9, 2012) was an American politician. He represented the third district of Massachusetts in the U.S. House of Representatives from 1975 to 1993.

== Early life and education ==
Early was born in Worcester, Massachusetts, on January 31, 1933. He attended Saint John's High School and graduated from the College of the Holy Cross with a Bachelor of Science (B.S.) in 1955. He then served in the United States Navy, 1955–1957. Following his time in the Navy he was employed as a high school teacher and basketball coach in Shrewsbury and Spencer.

== Political career ==
Early served six terms in the Massachusetts House of Representatives from 1963 to 1974. He was a delegate to Massachusetts State Democratic conventions from 1964 to 1970, and was elected as a Democrat to the 94th and to the eight succeeding Congresses (January 3, 1975 – January 3, 1993). He lost re-election in 1992 to Republican Peter I. Blute, in the aftermath of his implication in the House banking scandal and a nepotism scandal involving his brother George's employment in the Congressional Folding Room.

After his involvement in the House banking scandal came to light, Early gave a fiery speech to an empty House chamber where loudly said of his critics, "They ran like rats!!!", leading to widespread ridicule.

During his time in congress Early was regarded as one of the most "obscure" house representatives, neglecting to hold a press conference until 1990 and never hiring a press secretary. He died on November 9, 2012. His son, Joseph Early, Jr., today serves as the Worcester County District Attorney.

U.S. House of Representatives
Preceded by Harold Donohue	Member of the U.S. House of Representatives from Massachusetts's 3rd congressional district January 3, 1975 – January 3, 1993	Succeeded by Peter I. Blute
