= District No. 5 School (Shrewsbury, Massachusetts) =

- U.S. National Register of Historic Places
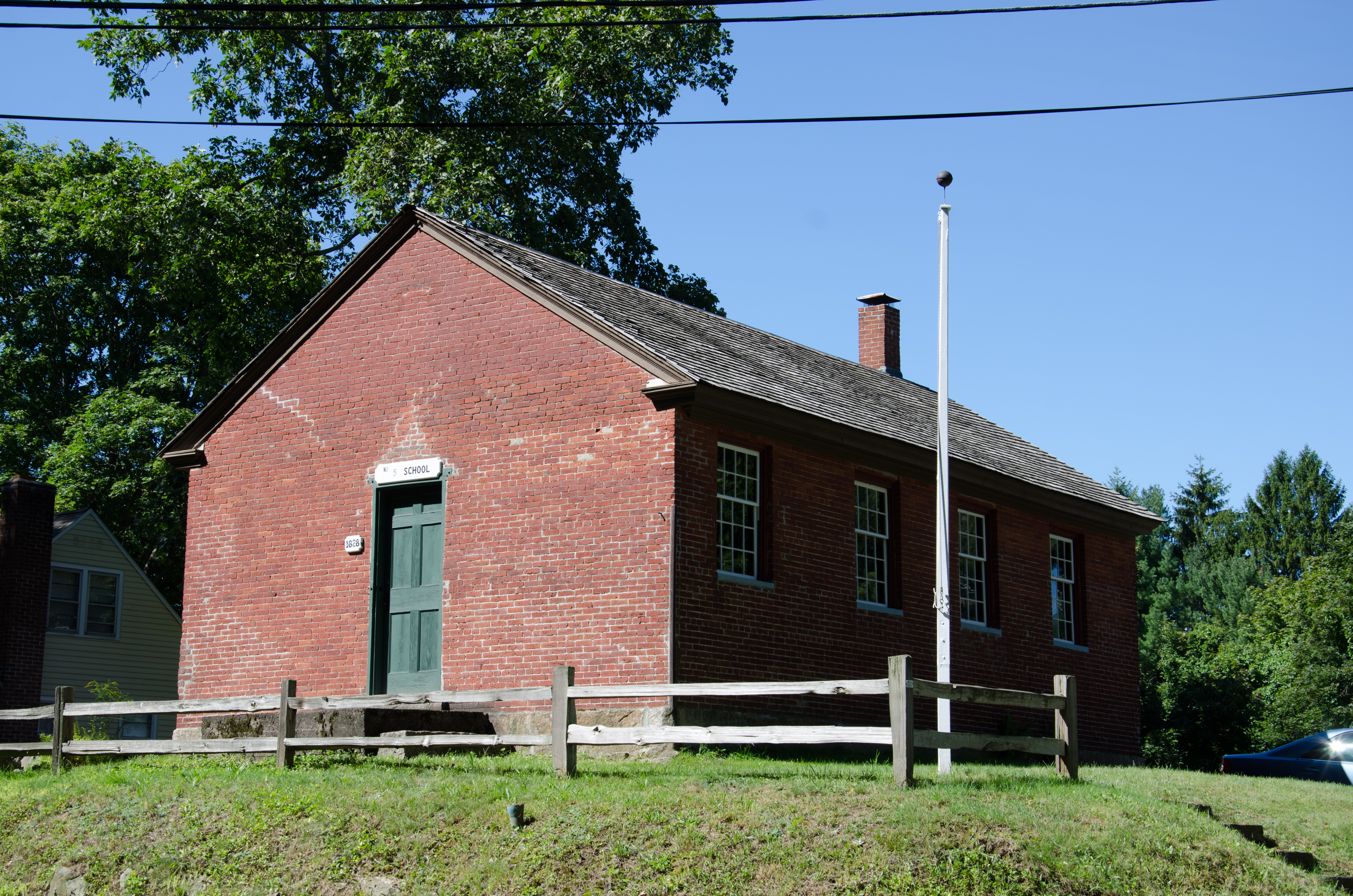

- Location within Massachusetts Location within the United States
- Location: 2 Old Mill Road, Shrewsbury, Massachusetts
- Coordinates: 42°17′29″N 71°44′29″W
- Area: less than one acre
- Built: 1828
- NRHP reference No.: 13000622
- Added to NRHP: August 27, 2013

The District No. 5 School is an historic school building and local history museum at 2 Old Mill Road in Shrewsbury, Massachusetts. It is one of two relatively unmodified one-room schoolhouses in the town. Built in 1828, the brick schoolhouse is also one of the oldest surviving school buildings in the state. The building was listed on the National Register of Historic Places in 2013.

== Description and history ==
The District No. 5 School is located in western Shrewsbury, on the west side of Old Mill Road just south of its junction with Main Street. It is a single-story brick structure, with a gable roof and a stone foundation. It measures about 21 by 31 feet (6.4 m × 9.4 m), with its long axis and roof oriented east–west. The eastern facade houses a single door, which provides access to the building. The north wall has four windows, placed slightly irregularly, while the south wall has only three. The west side has no windows, but also has evidence in the brickwork that there were once two windows. The interior of the school has a vestibule area, which then opens into the classroom. The wall separating the spaces is vertical tongue-and-groove, with an original Federal-period door. The classroom walls are finished in vertical tongue-and-groove wainscoting, with plaster above. Floors appear to be original random-width planking, fastened with cut nails.

The town of Shrewsbury, incorporated in 1727, established a district school system in about 1742, and had seven districts by 1792. The present district 5 schoolhouse was built in 1828 on land purchased from Orville Lothrop, whose farmhouse still stands to the northwest across Main Street. The school was funded and maintained by district residents until the state abolished the district system in 1869, after which the school (like the town's other district schools) was taken over by the town. It remained in use as a public school until 1917, and its ownership apparently reverted to the Lothrops, but was later retaken by the town for nonpayment of taxes. From the 1940s to 1960s it was being used as a residence, and it was restored in the 1970s to a turn-of-the-20th-century appearance. The local historical society purchased the property from the town for $1 in 1974, with stipulations that it be used for exclusively historical purposes. It is now operated by them as a museum.

== See also ==
- National Register of Historic Places listings in Worcester County, Massachusetts
