= Shrewsbury Public Schools =

School district in Massachusetts

Location
- 100 Maple Avenue Shrewsbury, MA, 01545; United States

District information
- Type: Public school district
- Grades: PK-12
- Superintendent: Joseph M. Sawyer
- Asst. superintendent(s): Amy B. Clouter
- Schools: 9

Students and staff
- Enrollment: 6,268
- Teachers: 416.5
- Student–teacher ratio: 15.0 to 1

Other information
- Website: schools.shrewsburyma.gov

The Shrewsbury Public School system is a suburban school district serving the town of Shrewsbury, Massachusetts. The school system is led by Superintendent Dr. Joseph M. Sawyer and Assistant Superintendent Amy B. Clouter.

== Schools ==
The school system consists of 9 schools.

- Shrewsbury High School (9-12)
- Oak Middle School (7-8)
- Sherwood Middle School (5-6)
- Calvin Coolidge School (K-4)
- Spring Street School (K-4)
- Floral Street School (K-4)
- Walter J. Paton School (K-4)
- Maj. Howard W. Beal School (K-4)
- Parker Road Preschool
