= Jonah Howe =

American politician

Member of the Massachusetts House of Representatives from the Shrewsbury, Worcester district

Personal details
- Born: January 2, 1749 Shrewsbury, Massachusetts
- Died: July 2, 1826 (aged 77) Shrewsbury, Massachusetts
- Spouse(s): Prudence (Bowker) Howe (m. 1771); Candace (Allen) Howe (m. 1819)
- Parent(s): Daniel Howe and Eunice (Taylor) Howe
- Profession: lawyer, state legislator

Jonah Howe (1749–1826) was a lawyer and farmer from Shrewsbury, Massachusetts and member of the Massachusetts House of Representatives.

== Personal background and family relations ==
Jonah Howe was born in Shrewsbury, Massachusetts on 2 January 1749 to Daniel Howe (1727-1750) and Eunice (Taylor) Howe (1729-?). He was a lawyer. Jonah Howe, Esq married Prudence Bowker (1751-1795), daughter of Lt. Charles Bowker and Eunice Stone, on 4 July 1771 at Shrewsbury. On 4 June 1819 he married Candace Allen in Shrewsbury. He was elected to the Massachusetts House of Representatives from the Shrewsbury, Worcester District. Howe died at his home in Shrewsbury on 2 July 1826.
