= Jim Ford (actor) =

American actor and director

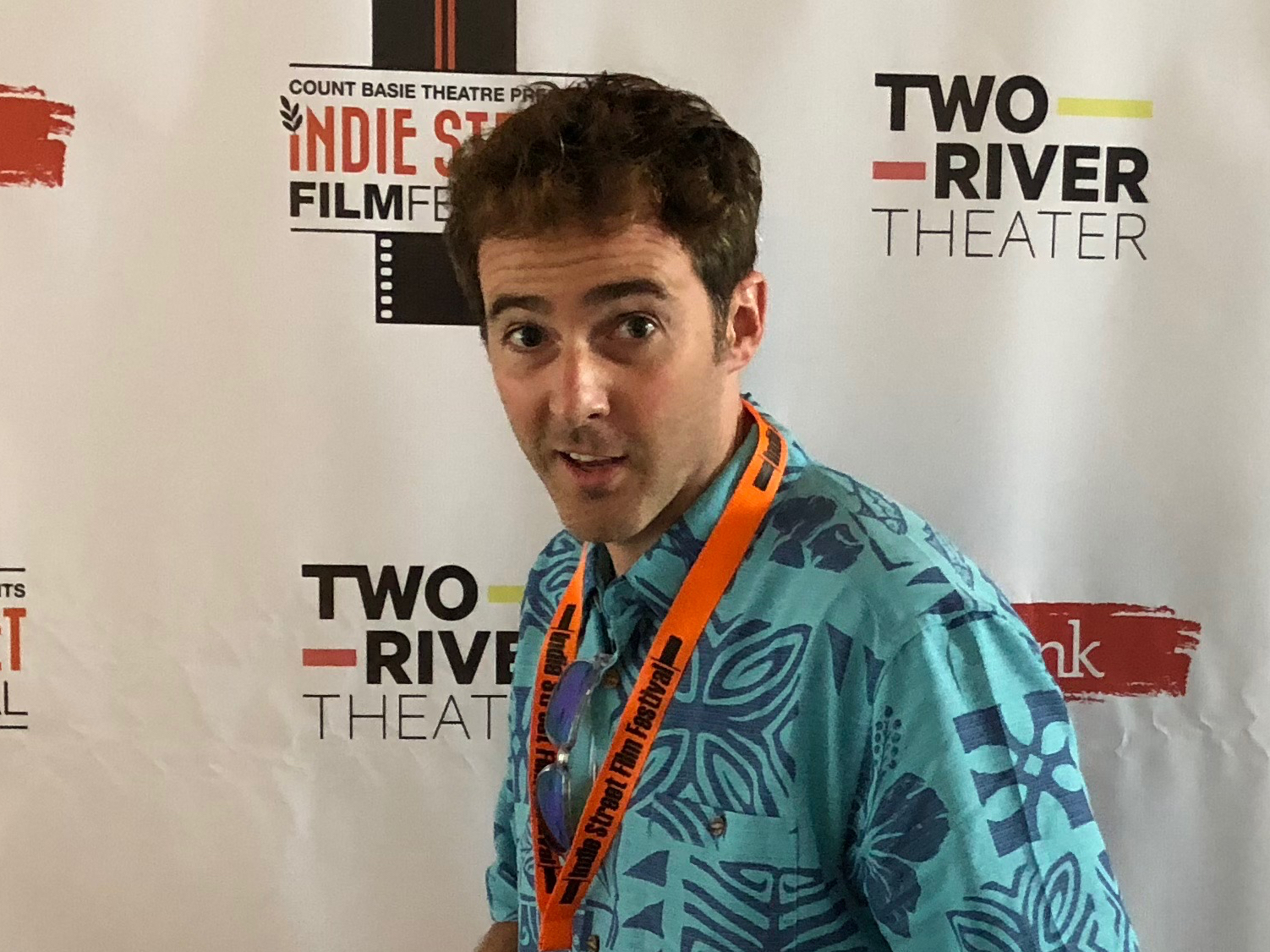
- Ford in 2018
- Born: September 15, 1981 (age 44); Worcester, Massachusetts, U.S.
- Occupations: Actor; stuntman; screenwriter; director
- Years active: 2005–present
- Website: http://jimford.com/

Jim Ford (born September 15, 1981) is an American film and television actor, stuntman, screenwriter and film director. He wrote and directed the short films Reconnaissance (2007), Gotta Go (2008), Wiffle Ball (2008), Timmy Text Message (2009), and White Zin (2010).

== Background ==
Ford was born in Worcester, Massachusetts. He is the son of Linda, a Nurse Practitioner, and John Ford, a Fire-fighter. Ford grew up in West Boylston, Massachusetts. He graduated from St. John's High School in 2000 and went to the University of Hartford where he received a B.F.A. in theatre from the Hartt School conservatory. Ford participated in sports growing up, including BMX, snowboarding and skateboarding. He enrolled in a sketch comedy class when in 6th grade at The Bancroft school, and was able to write and direct his own skits and imitate some of the faculty, after which he began doing plays and short films. With the help of friends he completed over a dozen short films and two full length feature films before his senior year of high school.

== Career ==
Shortly after graduating from college in 2004, Ford moved to New York City. He landed an agent within months and began working immediately. He landed several commercials for companies such as The World Poker Tour, Snickers, Stride Gum, Microsoft, New York Lottery, although his first film job was as a football player in Across the Universe. Next was the low-budget horror film Knock Knock. Jim had landed several roles in television shows such as Gossip Girl, Law and Order, The Sopranos, Fringe, and Blue Bloods. Ford was also the 2007-2009 face of Intel. It was a worldwide print campaign that had his face and body on billboards and magazines all around the world. In a short time Jim has completed over 100 films, TV shows, commercials and acted or performed stunts alongside actors like: Edward Norton, Colin Farrell, Christopher Walken, Gerard Butler, Tom Cruise, Cameron Diaz, Adam Sandler, and Kevin James. He earned his first Screen Actors Guild Nomination for his work on the film The Irishman.

== Filmography ==
=== Film ===
- Shuffle Mode (2006) as Bathroom Thinker
- Mo (2007) as Barry
- I Now Pronounce You Chuck and Larry (2007) as Criminal stuck in the chimney (uncredited)
- Knock Knock (2007) as Billy Smith
- Across the Universe (film) (2007) as Football Player
- Reconnaissance (2007) as Nick Navy
- The Crate (2007) (V) as Tim Reeves
- Symmetry Symmetry (2008) as Nahthan Repper
- Wiffle Ball (2008) as Rickey Runner
- Kung Fu Granny (2008) as Peach
- Frat House Massacre (2008) as Rabbit
- 7 Million Tickets (2008) as Ben Thelsman
- Car Valet (2009) as Timmy
- Timmy Text Message (2009) as Timmy Text
- Black Eyed Girl (2009) as Ezra Otis
- The Town (2010) as FBI Swat (uncredited)
- White Zin (2010) as Jim Beringer
- Toolbox Bandit (2010) as Luke Dawson
- All In (2010) as Joey
- Revenge of the Green Dragons (2014) as Anthony Gallivan
- Touched with Fire (2015) as Police Officer (uncredited)
- American Dresser (2018) as Gavin
- A Vigilante (2018) as Barfly #3
- We Have Your Wife (2018) as Greg Smith

=== Television ===
- The Maury Povich Show (1 episode, 2005) as John
- Conviction (2 episodes, 2006) as Assistant District Attorney
- The Sopranos (1 episode, 2006) as Cashier
- Law & Order (1 episode, 2006) as Skateboarder
- Gossip Girl (1 episode, 2008) as Joe
- Fringe (1 episode, 2009) as Tech #3
- Gravity (2010) as Bike Messenger
- Gotham (2 episodes, 2015) As Adam Jadowsky
- The Mysteries of Laura (1 episode, 2015) as Ronald
- Madam Secretary (1 episode, 2016) as Ron Janeway
- Blue Bloods (1 episode, 2016) as Driver

=== Video games ===
- L.A. Noire (2011) as Additional Voices (voice) (uncredited)
- Grand Theft Auto V (2013) as Various (voice) (uncredited)

=== Stunts ===
- One Tree Hill (1 episode, 2006) (TV)
- The Sopranos (1 episode, 2007) (TV)
- I Now Pronounce You Chuck & Larry (2007)
- CSI: NY (1 episode, 2007) (TV)
- College Road Trip (2008)
- John Adams (5 episodes, 2008) (TV)
- Pride and Glory (2008)
- Frat House Massacre (2008)
- The Clique (2008) (V)
- Friday Night Lights (1 episode, 2008) (TV)
- The Maiden Heist (2009)
- As the World Turns (2 episodes, 2009) (TV)
- The Good Heart (2009)
- Leaves of Grass (2009)
- Law Abiding Citizen (2009)
- Surrogates (2009)
- The Bleeding (2009)
- When in Rome (2010)
- The Bounty Hunter (2010)
- Ugly Betty (2 episodes, 2008–2010) (TV)
- Knight and Day (2010)
- The Irishman (2019)
- Glass (2019)

== Literature ==
- 2020 – My Take on All Fifty States – non-fiction

== Awards and honors ==
Ford received a Screen Actors Guild Nomination for his role as a stunt performer in the film, The Irishman.
