= Hebert Candies =

American candy company

- Company type: Privately held company
- Founded: 1917
- Founder: Frederick Hebert
- Headquarters: Shrewsbury, Massachusetts, United States
- Key people: Sheila Shechtman (CEO)
- Owner: American Gourmet Group
- Parent: American Gourmet Group

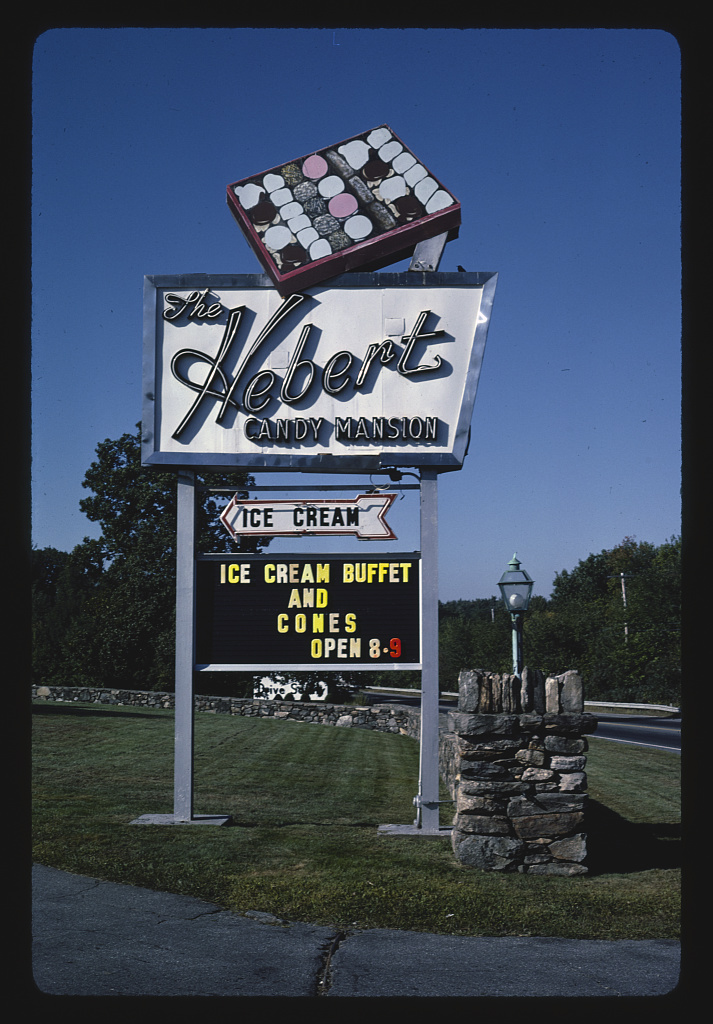
Hebert Candy Mansion sign

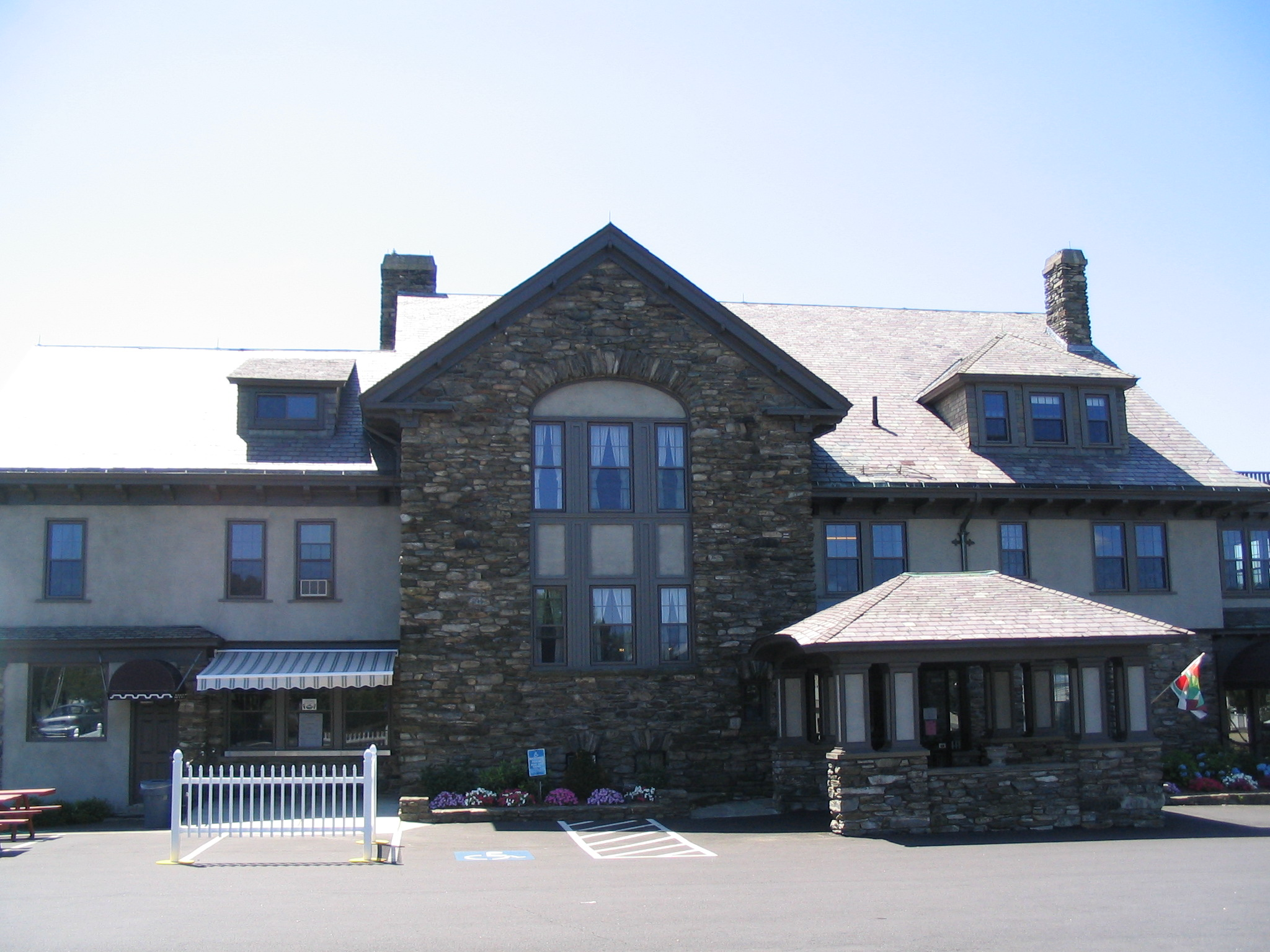
The Hebert Candy Mansion in Shrewsbury, Massachusetts

Hebert Candies is an American brand of confectionery owned by American Gourmet Group, LLC. Hebert Candies is headquartered in Shrewsbury, Massachusetts, in a Tudor stone mansion off Route 20. The "candy mansion" is the company's sole retail outlet and candy manufacturing facility and has become a destination for locals and tourists alike.

== Company history ==
Hebert Candies was founded in 1917 when Frederick E. Hebert purchased a copper kettle, knife, table iron, and thermometer for $11.00. In 1946, Mr. Hebert purchased a Tudor stone mansion on Route 20 (the major route connecting Central Massachusetts with Boston) in Shrewsbury, Massachusetts, and moved his candy-making operations there. As a result, Hebert Candies became the first roadside confectioner in the entire United States. In 1956, after tasting white-coat candies while traveling in Europe, Hebert introduced white chocolate to the United States, and was the first to do so.

Frederick Hebert and his two sons Gerald and Raymond Hebert successfully grew the business to nine retail outlets in the New England area and shipped candy around the world. Later, Gerald would buy out his brother Raymond and assume sole ownership. Gerald Hebert's sons Ronald, Richard, and Frederick Jr., and daughter Dianne developed the candy bar fund raising business for Hebert Candies. They later sold millions of candy bars to organizations in United States and Canada.

Hebert Candies was acquired in August 2005 and continues its retail operation and manufacturing facilities at the Candy Mansion.

Previously in 2004, Hebert Candies had sold the chocolate bar manufacturing equipment and fundraising portion of the company to LaMontagne of Canada. LaMontagne and the new owner of Hebert's, Pete Perkins of Sabrosa Foods, could not come to terms and subsequently LaMontagne severed ties and ceased production of chocolate bars labeled for Hebert Candies.

In 2005, investment firm Longmeadow Capital Partners LLC acquired Hebert Candies. Along with this acquisition, the candy maker launched its melon-colored packaging as part of a rebranding campaign aimed at giving Hebert products a fresher, more modern look. The aim was to refresh its image, boost sales and snag online business as a "premium affordable" candy maker in New England.

In the Spring of 2012 Hebert Candies became part of American Gourmet Group, LLC which conducts a wholesale gourmet food and spa gift basket business and which is also a Longmeadow Capital Partners, LLC company. American Gourmet Group, LLC wholesales its gift baskets to national retailers on-line and in-store. It also distributes its gift baskets in the promotional products industry under the trade name, Gifted Expressions. As to the two businesses coming together, Sheila Shechtman, CEO of American Gourmet, said "our goal is to marry Gifted Expressions' creativity, differentiation and customer focus with Hebert's capacity to manufacture artisanal and promotional branded chocolates and gifts."
