= Peter Blute =

American politician

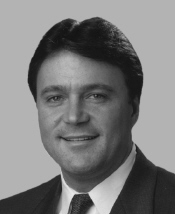

Executive Director of the Massachusetts Port Authority
- In office January 6, 1997 – August 18, 1999
- Governor: Bill Weld; Paul Cellucci
- Preceded by: Stephen Tocco
- Succeeded by: Virginia Buckingham

Member of the U.S. House of Representatives from Massachusetts's 3rd district
- In office January 3, 1993 – January 3, 1997
- Preceded by: Joseph D. Early
- Succeeded by: Jim McGovern

Member of the Massachusetts House of Representatives from the 11th Worcester district
- In office January 7, 1987 – January 3, 1993
- Preceded by: Roberta Goldman
- Succeeded by: Ronald Gauch

Personal details
- Born: January 28, 1956 (age 70) Worcester, Massachusetts, U.S.
- Party: Republican
- Spouse: Robi Blute
- Children: 2
- Education: Boston College (BA)

Peter Ignatius Blute (born January 28, 1956) is an American businessman and former politician who served as a Republican member of the United States House of Representatives. He served two terms, between January 3, 1993, and January 3, 1997, representing Massachusetts' 3rd congressional district. As of 2026, Blute and colleague Peter G. Torkildsen remain the last Republicans elected to serve in the United States House delegation from Massachusetts.

== Early life and career ==
Blute was born in Worcester, Massachusetts, one of 11 siblings. He grew up and currently lives in Shrewsbury, Massachusetts, where he attended St. John's High School. He earned his B.A. at Boston College in 1978. He was the owner of a sports promotion and marketing firm, and then a marketing representative for The Burdett School.

Blute was elected to the Massachusetts House of Representatives in 1986 and served until 1993 when he was elected as a Republican to the 103rd Congress and then reelected to the 104th Congress. A Republican, he defeated 9-term incumbent Joseph Early, who is also a St. John's High School alumnus, in 1992 to become the first Republican to represent this district since 1947. After two terms in the House, Blute was defeated by current Congressman James P. McGovern in 1996 in a reelection bid for the 105th Congress. Since Blute's defeat, no other Massachusetts Republican has been elected to the House.

== After Congress ==
From 1997 to 1999, Blute served as executive director of the Massachusetts Port Authority (MassPort). His tenure at MassPort came to an end following revelations of a workday "booze cruise", originally paid for with Massport funds and billed as a "survey" of Boston Harbor, during which a female passenger, actress Gidget Churchill, aboard the vessel with Blute exposed her breasts to a Boston Herald photographer. Questions remain as to why Churchill exposed herself and who notified the local media as to the time and date of the cruise.

Blute was then a radio talk show host for WRKO Boston from 5:30 to 9 am, co-hosting with Andy Moes from 1999 to 2001, John Osterlind from 2001 to 2003, and Scott Allen Miller from 2003 until he left WRKO on October 3, 2005. He moved on to AM 830 WCRN Worcester in early 2006, and hosted the station's 6 to 9 am drive-time program until leaving WCRN on May 27, 2011.

On December 21, 2011, Blute was named deputy chairman of the Massachusetts Republican Party.

== Family ==
Blute is the son of Dr. Robert Blute and Ann-Marie Blute, a Dame of Malta.

Blute is one of eleven siblings. One of his sisters, Paula Ebben, is a news anchor for WBZ-TV.

Blute's grandfather, Paul H. Hines, served as state representative and as an aide to Mayor John Hynes. His uncle, Peter F. Hines, served on the Boston City Council from 1958 to 1968 and was a candidate for Mayor in 1967.

In 2005, Boston magazine ranked the Blute family the 10th out of 50 families "that run [Boston]".

== Electoral history ==
- 1992 Race for 3rd Massachusetts US Congressional District
  - Rep. Joseph Early (D), 44.3%
  - Peter Blute (R), 50.4%
  - Others, 5.3%
- 1994 Race for 3rd Massachusetts US Congressional District
  - Rep. Peter Blute (R), 54.6%
  - Kevin O'Sullivan (D), 44.2%
  - Others, 1.2%
- 1996 Race for 3rd Massachusetts US Congressional District
  - Rep. Peter Blute (R), 45.4%
  - James P. McGovern (D), 52.9%
  - Others, 1.7%

U.S. House of Representatives
Preceded by Joseph D. Early	Member of the U.S. House of Representatives from Massachusetts's 3rd congressional district 1993–1997	Succeeded by Jim McGovern
U.S. order of precedence (ceremonial)
Preceded by Robert H. Steele as Former U.S. Representative	Order of precedence of the United States as Former U.S. Representative	Succeeded by Peter Torkildsen as Former U.S. Representative
