= Shrewsbury High School (Massachusetts) =

Coordinates: 42°18′12″N 71°44′40″W

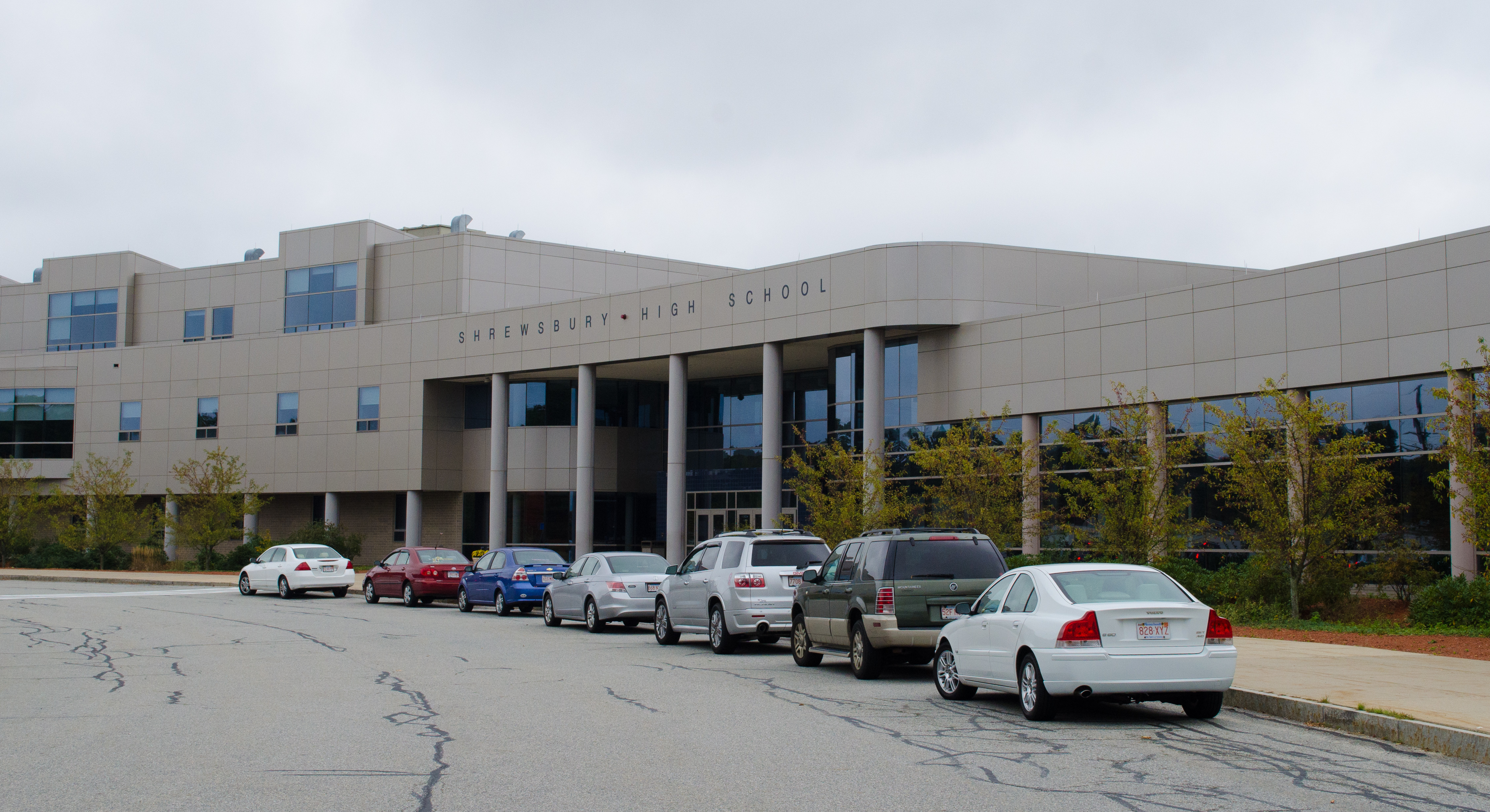
- 75 Cypress Ave; Shrewsbury, Massachusetts 01545; United States

Information
- Type: Public; Open enrollment
- Superintendent: Joseph M. Sawyer
- Principal: Todd H. Bazydlo
- Teaching staff: 130.97 (FTE)
- Grades: 9-12
- Enrollment: 1,879 (2023–2024)
- Student to teacher ratio: 14.35
- Language: English
- Schedule type: 7 Day Rotation with Daily Drop
- Hours in school day: 6.5
- Colors: Navy and Vegas gold
- Athletics conference: Midland Wachusett League
- Mascot: Colonials
- Newspaper: The Town Crier
- Information: No. of Pools = 1
- Website: schools.shrewsburyma.gov/high

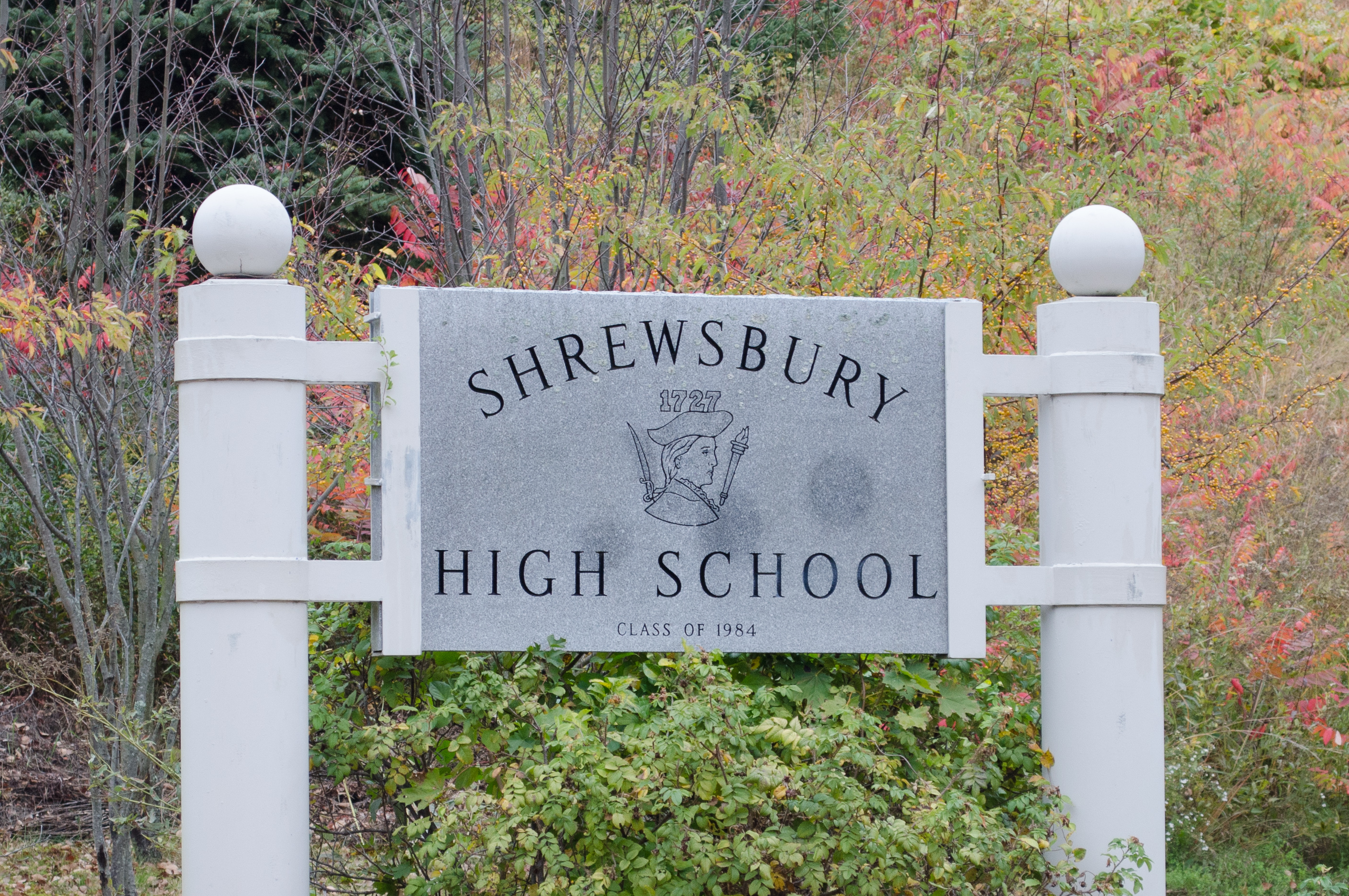
Sign at the school entrance

Shrewsbury High School is a public high school located in Shrewsbury, Massachusetts, United States. It is the only public high school in the Shrewsbury Public Schools district. The current principal is Todd Bazydlo. Shrewsbury High School is part of Shrewsbury Public Schools, the current superintendent of which is Dr. Joseph Sawyer.

== History ==
The current campus, located on top of a hill on Cypress Avenue, opened in 2002 with a capacity of 1,400 students, though enrollment has increased to 1,835 students as of October 2021. However by modern design standards the schools capacity is 1,200.

Prior to that it was located at what is now Oak Middle School on Oak Street, and before that was located at the recently closed Beal School on Maple Avenue.

== Athletics ==
Varsity sports
Season	Boys	Girls
Fall	football, golf, cross country, boat team, soccer	field hockey, golf, cross country, volleyball, cheerleading, crew, soccer
Winter	basketball, ice hockey, swimming, indoor track and field	basketball, ice hockey, swimming, indoor track and field, gymnastics, cheerleading
Spring	baseball, lacrosse, tennis, outdoor track and field, crew, volleyball	softball, lacrosse, tennis, outdoor track and field, crew

The school also received the PEP Grant and has fleshed out the classes the school offers in its physical education programs. The new programs include biking and a ropes course.

The boys' hockey team won three state championships in five years between 2014 and 2018 (2014, 2017, and 2018). The boys beat Hanover in 2014 and 2018, and Old Rochester High School in 2017. Following their 2018 State Championship, they were promoted to Division I in Massachusetts High School Hockey, joining the division as an independent team not belonging to a conference.

Improvements to the athletic campus and to the playing and practice conditions of sports, is funded by the Athletic booster club. Shrewsbury High School's campus recently added a turf field, breaking ground in an informal ceremony on June 5, 2018. The new field accommodates lacrosse, soccer, football, field hockey, track and field, and cross country. Physical education class also utilizes the field. The addition of a turf field will hopefully reduce maintenance costs and also generate revenue, as youth sports programs, as well as games and jamborees can be hosted.

== Music and theater ==
SHS offers a variety of music and theater classes and performing ensembles. The classes include: Music Theory I & AP Music Theory, Theater Arts, Movement for Theater, Theater Design, and Music Technology.

Wind performing ensembles under the direction of Mrs. Caryn Wardwell: Pep Band, Marching Band, Concert Band, Honors Wind Ensemble, Honors Jazz Band.

Vocal performing ensembles under the direction of Mr. Michael Lapomardo (“Strell”): Freshman Choir, Mixed Choir, Honors Treble Choir (previously named Honors Women's Choir), Honors Chamber Choir.

String performing ensembles: Shrewsbury High School Orchestra and Honors Chamber Orchestra under the direction of Mr. Jordan Proctor

== Advanced placement classes ==
Shrewsbury High School offers these advanced placement classes:

- AP Mandarin Chinese
- AP United States History
- AP Studio Art Drawing
- AP English Language and Composition
- AP English Literature and Composition
- AP Environmental Science
- AP Biology
- AP Physics
- AP Chemistry
- AP Statistics
- AP Calculus both AB and BC
- AP Psychology
- AP Human Geography
- AP Music Theory
- AP Spanish Language
- AP French Language
- AP Latin (only offered if enough demand)
- AP Comparative Government and Politics

Other advanced placement classes are offered in the Virtual High School program.

== Notable alumni ==
- Brittany Altomare, professional golfer
- Caleb Crain, Contributor to The New Yorker, author of the 2013 novel Necessary Errors
- Shawn Loiseau, Linebacker in the National Arena League
- BoyWithUke, formally known as Charley Yang, Singer
