= Shrewsbury Historic District (Shrewsbury, Massachusetts) =

Historic district in Massachusetts, United States

- U.S. National Register of Historic Places
- U.S. Historic district
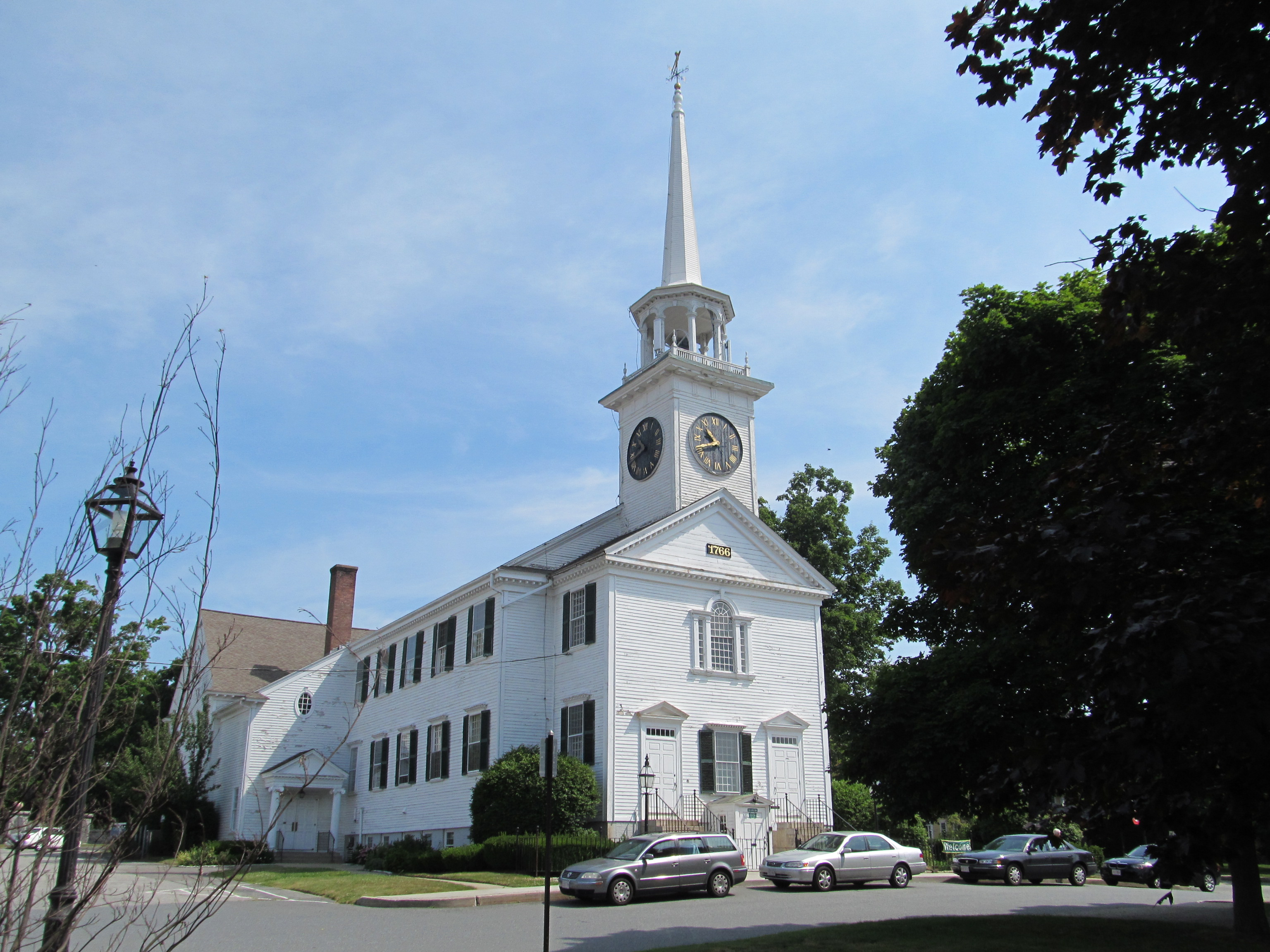
- First Congregational Church

- Location within Massachusetts Location within the United States
- Location: Shrewsbury, Massachusetts
- Coordinates: 42°17′53″N 71°42′50″W
- Area: 14 acres (5.7 ha)
- Built: 1721
- Architect: Hemenway, Daniel; et al.
- Architectural style: Renaissance, Federal
- NRHP reference No.: 76000309
- Added to NRHP: October 8, 1976

The Shrewsbury Historic District encompasses the historic early center of the town of Shrewsbury, Massachusetts. It consists of the town common, laid out in 1721 at what are now Main and Prospect Streets, and buildings adjacent or nearby. The district was declared locally in 1972, and was added to the National Register of Historic Places in 1976.

== Description and history ==
The town of Shrewsbury was settled in 1721 and incorporated in 1727. Its town common was one of the first parts of the town to be laid out, along what was then one of the Boston Post Roads, connecting Boston to Springfield. The area remained residential and civic in character, with the town's economic center focused on the Post Road (now Main Street) just west of the common. The properties surrounding the common have retained broad lawns and an open character, typical of the 18th and 19th century.

The visual focus of the historic district is the First Congregational Church, located at the north end of the common. It was built in 1766, using materials salvaged from the town's first meetinghouse, built on the same site in 1722. West of the church stands the 1830 brick schoolhouse, now housing town offices and the local historical society. On the west side of the common is the town's main firestation, a modern construction, and the much-extended 1797 Sumner House, built for the town's second minister and now converted into a funeral home. Northeast of the church, at the junction of Boylston and Grafton Streets, and across Grafton Street east of the common, stand three early 19th-century houses. At the junction of Main and Grafton Streets stands the Shrewsbury Public Library, built in 1903 and a fine example of Renaissance Revival architecture.

== See also ==
- National Register of Historic Places listings in Worcester County, Massachusetts
