= Shrewsbury, Massachusetts =

Town in Massachusetts, United States

- Town
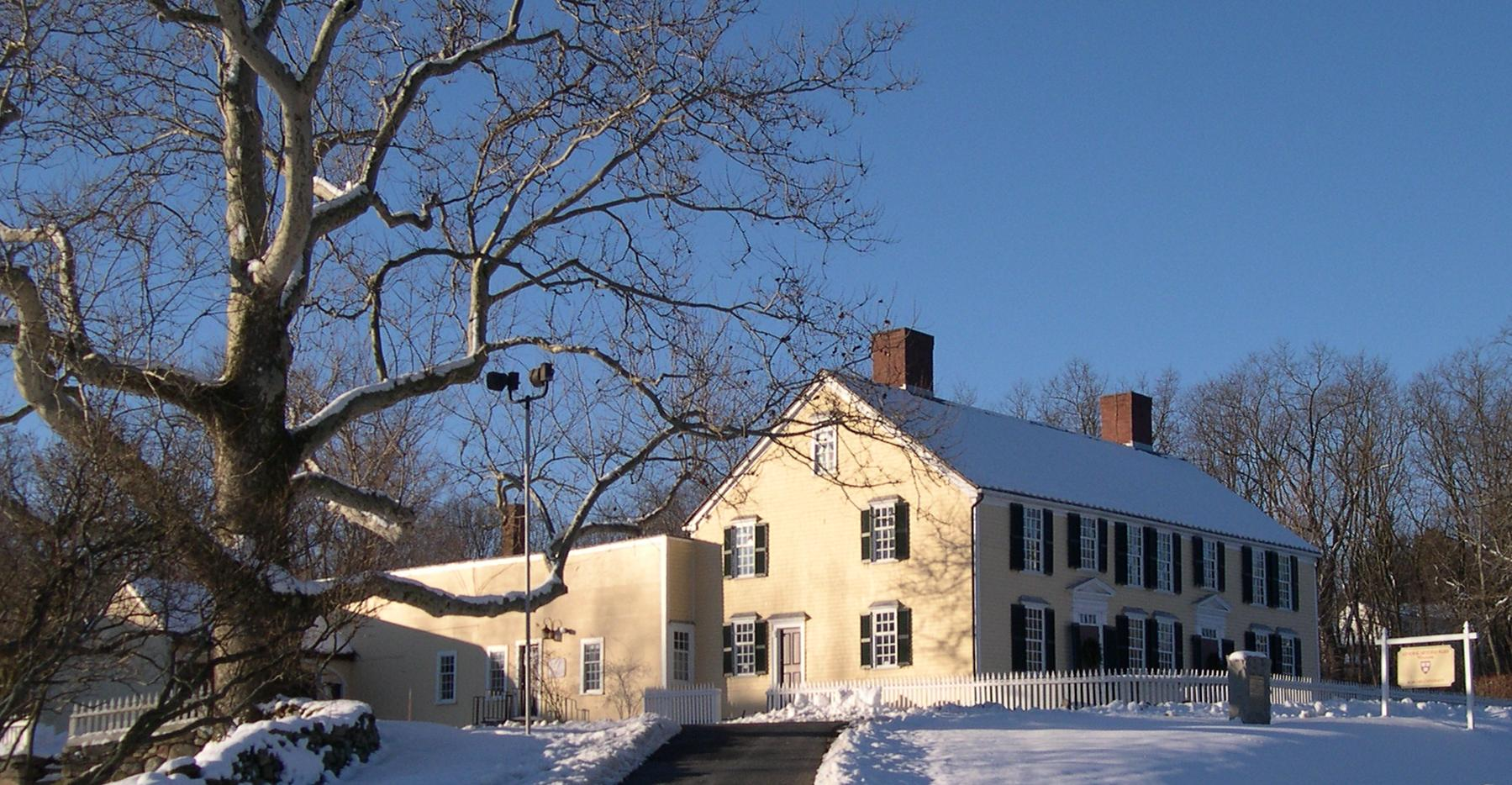
- Homestead of General Artemas Ward

- Seal
- Nickname: The Bury
- Location in Worcester County and the state of Massachusetts
- Coordinates: 42°17′45″N 71°42′48″W
- Country: United States
- State: Massachusetts
- County: Worcester
- Settled: 1722
- Incorporated: 1727

Government
  - Type: Representative town meeting
  - Town Manager: Kevin Mizikar
  - Select Board: Beth N. Casavant; Gregg Richards; Theresa H. Flynn; Michelle K. Conlin; Carlos A. Garcia

Area
  - Total: 21.7 sq mi (56.1 km^{2})
  - Land: 20.7 sq mi (53.7 km^{2})
  - Water: 0.93 sq mi (2.4 km^{2})
- Elevation: 669 ft (204 m)

Population (2020)
  - Total: 38,325
  - Density: 1,848/sq mi (713.7/km^{2})
- Time zone: UTC−5 (Eastern)
  - Summer (DST): UTC−4 (Eastern)
- ZIP Code: 01545
- Area code: 508 / 774
- FIPS code: 69-60165
- GNIS feature ID: 619489
- Website: www.shrewsburyma.gov

Shrewsbury (/ˈʃruːzbɛri/ SHROOZ-bury) is a town in Worcester County, Massachusetts, United States. The population was 38,325 according to the 2020 United States census, in nearly 15,000 households.

Incorporated in 1727, Shrewsbury prospered in the 19th century due to its proximity to Worcester, and from visitors to Lake Quinsigamond. The town is governed under the New England representative town meeting system, headed by the Town Manager and five-member elected Select Board.

== History ==
The Town of Shrewsbury, named for Shrewsbury, England, is a community with an uneven and hilly terrain cut by a number of minor streams providing several small water power sites. Grants of land were made in what would eventually be the town beginning in 1664, with the 3,200-acre (13 km^{2}) grant called Haynes Farm as the largest. In 1664 Native American leader, Peter Jethro, and other Nipmuc Indians deeded land around Lake Quinsigamond to settlers in the area. Settlers came primarily from Sudbury and Marlborough, and the first permanent settler was Gersham Wheelock in 1720. As a town, Shrewsbury was first settled in 1722 and officially incorporated in 1727.

Townspeople created an agricultural economy with apple orchards, and by 1750, there were two stores and four taverns as well as several small industries in operation. The rapid fall of prices for agricultural goods, the shortage of hard currency, and the general economic depression following the Revolutionary War produced disastrous conditions for colonists. Shays' Rebellion in 1786 sought to close the courts to prevent debt collections and the foreclosure of mortgages. Shrewsbury became a staging area for the rebellion and the encampment of the more than 400 insurgents, before the march on the Worcester Court House.

A leather industry began in 1786 in Shrewsbury, and town farmers developed large cattle herds to support the manufacture of boots and shoes. This was followed by the establishment of gunsmithing operations in 1797, which produced rifles, shotguns and pistols and eventually cutlery. Luther Goddard began in 1809 by making brass clocks and then established a small watch factory employing a few skilled Swiss and English watchmakers. Lumbering created sawmills, and they in turn drew chair and cabinet makers, plow and wagon builders.

The development of streetcar routes in the 19th century propelled the growth of single-family housing in town. A summer resort population on Lake Quinsigamond became consumers of the market garden produce grown by town farmers. As Shrewsbury's industry was killed by the lack of large waterpower sites and the tardy arrival of the railroad, its role as a suburb of Worcester grew more important. The town's population doubled from 1915 to 1940 as continued streetcar suburb growth brought more modern settlers into the community. Other modern developments included an increased number of lakeside cottages, ethnic clubs and recreational areas on the lake.

The 1953 Worcester tornado came through the Shrewsbury area, killing twelve people and causing extensive damage.

Since the late 20th century, Shrewsbury and neighboring Westborough have seen a large influx of immigration from South Asia, particularly India.

== Geography ==
Shrewsbury is a suburb of Worcester. The town has a total area of 21.6 square miles (56 km^{2}), of which 20.7 square miles (54 km^{2}) is land and 0.9 sq mi (2.3 km^{2}), or 4.25%, is water. Busta Rhymes Island is located in Shrewsbury.

=== Climate ===
Climate data for Shrewsbury, Massachusetts
| Month | Jan | Feb | Mar | Apr | May | Jun | Jul | Aug | Sep | Oct | Nov | Dec | Year |
|---|---|---|---|---|---|---|---|---|---|---|---|---|---|
| Record high °F | 64 | 70 | 83 | 90 | 97 | 96 | 96 | 98 | 96 | 86 | 78 | 69 | 98 |
| Mean daily maximum °F | 33 | 36 | 44 | 55 | 68 | 76 | 81 | 79 | 71 | 61 | 50 | 38 | 58 |
| Mean daily minimum °F | 15 | 17 | 26 | 37 | 48 | 57 | 63 | 61 | 52 | 40 | 32 | 22 | 39 |
| Record low °F | −26 | −15 | −6 | 13 | 28 | 34 | 42 | 36 | 28 | 18 | 9 | −10 | −26 |
| Average precipitation inches | 4.20 | 3.48 | 4.27 | 4.36 | 3.94 | 3.93 | 3.80 | 4.26 | 4.11 | 4.33 | 4.46 | 3.99 | 49.13 |
| Record high °C | 18 | 21 | 28 | 32 | 36 | 36 | 36 | 37 | 36 | 30 | 26 | 21 | 37 |
| Mean daily maximum °C | 1 | 2 | 7 | 13 | 20 | 24 | 27 | 26 | 22 | 16 | 10 | 3 | 14 |
| Mean daily minimum °C | −9 | −8 | −3 | 3 | 9 | 14 | 17 | 16 | 11 | 4 | 0 | −6 | 4 |
| Record low °C | −32 | −26 | −21 | −11 | −2 | 1 | 6 | 2 | −2 | −8 | −13 | −23 | −32 |
| Average precipitation mm | 107 | 88 | 108 | 111 | 100 | 100 | 97 | 108 | 104 | 110 | 113 | 101 | 1,247 |
Source: Weather.com

== Demographics ==
Historical population
| Year | Pop. | ±% |
|---|---|---|
| 1790 | 963 | — |
| 1850 | 1,596 | +65.7% |
| 1860 | 1,558 | −2.4% |
| 1870 | 1,610 | +3.3% |
| 1880 | 1,500 | −6.8% |
| 1890 | 1,449 | −3.4% |
| 1900 | 1,626 | +12.2% |
| 1910 | 1,946 | +19.7% |
| 1920 | 3,708 | +90.5% |
| 1930 | 6,910 | +86.4% |
| 1940 | 7,586 | +9.8% |
| 1950 | 10,594 | +39.7% |
| 1960 | 16,622 | +56.9% |
| 1970 | 19,196 | +15.5% |
| 1980 | 22,674 | +18.1% |
| 1990 | 24,146 | +6.5% |
| 2000 | 31,640 | +31.0% |
| 2010 | 35,608 | +12.5% |
| 2020 | 38,325 | +7.6% |
| 2025* | 39,627 | +3.4% |
* = population estimate. Source: United States census records and Population Estimates Program data.

By the 2020 census, the population had reached 38,325.

As of the 2020 Census, there were 38,325 people, the racial makeup of the town was 64.1% White, 2.5% African American, 0.1% Native American, 24.6% Asian, 0.01% Pacific Islander, 0.2% from other races, and 6.5% from two or more races. Hispanic or Latino of any race were 4.2% of the population.

As of the 2020 Census, there were 14,966 households, out of which 34.5% had children under the age of 18 living with them, 60.1% were married couples living together, 7.5% had a female householder with no husband present, and 29.7% were non-families. Of all households 25.3% were made up of individuals, and 10.5% had someone living alone who was 65 years of age or older. The average household size was 2.54, and the average family size was 3.09.

In the town, the population was spread out, with 25.6% under the age of 18, 5.0% from 18 to 24, 33.4% from 25 to 44, 22.4% from 45 to 64, and 13.5% who were 65 years of age or older. The median age was 38 years. For every 100 females, there were 94.6 males. For every 100 females age 18 and over, there were 91.4 males.

The median income for a household in the town was $109,000 and the median income for a family was $124,000 (as of the 2010 census). Males had a median income of $56,259 versus $37,129 for females. The per capita income for the town was $45,570. About 3.3% of families and 4.8% of the population were below the poverty line, including 4.6% of those under age 18 and 7.6% of those age 65 or over.

== Economy ==
=== Notable businesses ===
- Hebert Candies, where white chocolate was first produced in the United States.
- The now-defunct Worcester Foundation for Experimental Biology was a research facility where the combined oral contraceptive pill was first developed. The campus is now the Hoagland-Pincus Conference Center of the University of Massachusetts Medical School.
- The now-defunct Spag's, an all-purpose store, which predated Costco, Walmart and other similar outlets. The site is now a retail development.
- The now-defunct White City amusement park, now the site of a shopping plaza.

== Arts and culture ==
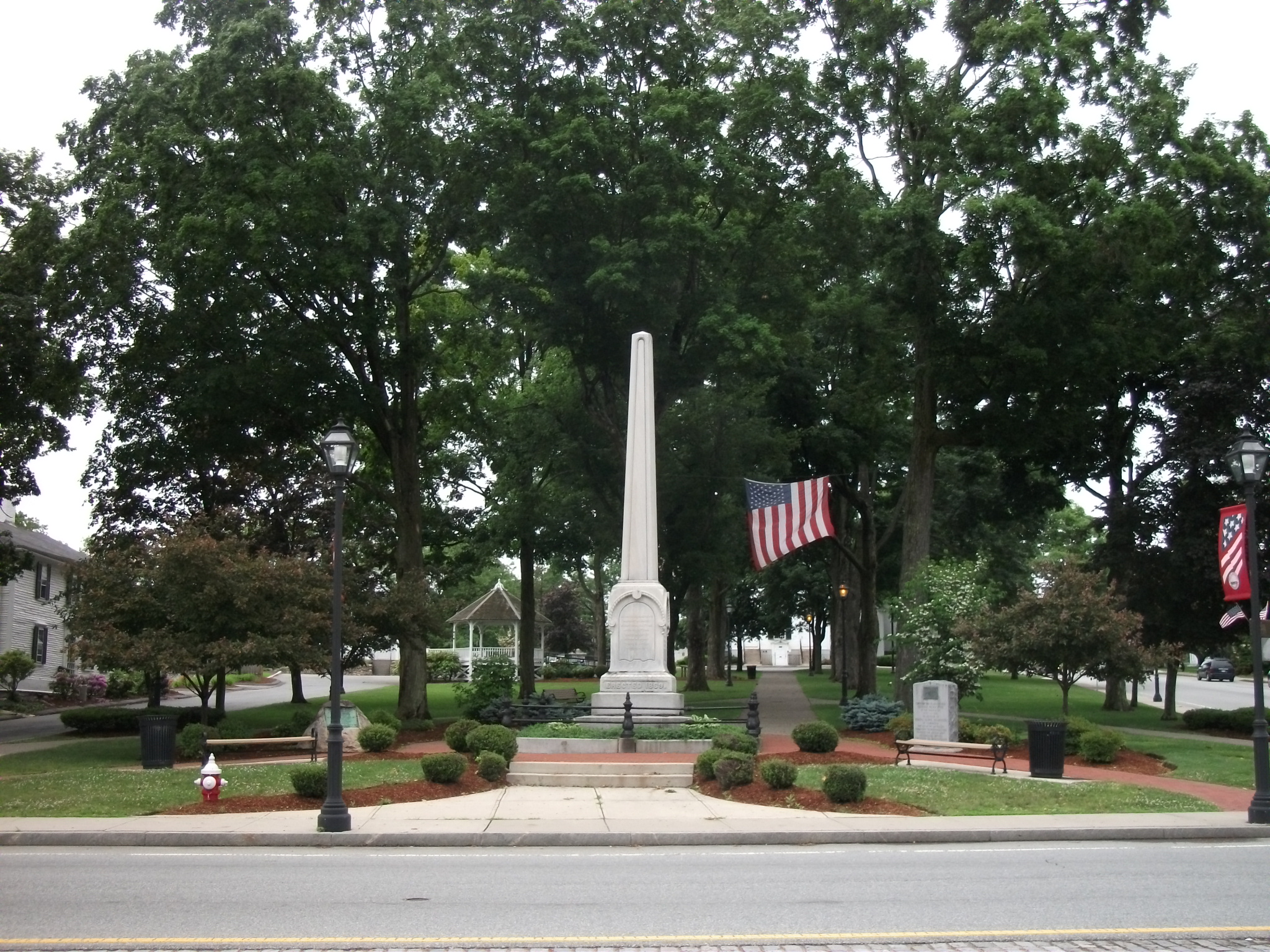
Civil War monument in Shrewsbury Common

=== Registered historic places ===
The following sites in Shrewbury are listed on the National Register of Historic Places:

- General Artemas Ward House
- District No. 5 School
- Shrewsbury Historic District, in the town center
- Two 1767 Milestones from the Boston Post Road

=== Library ===
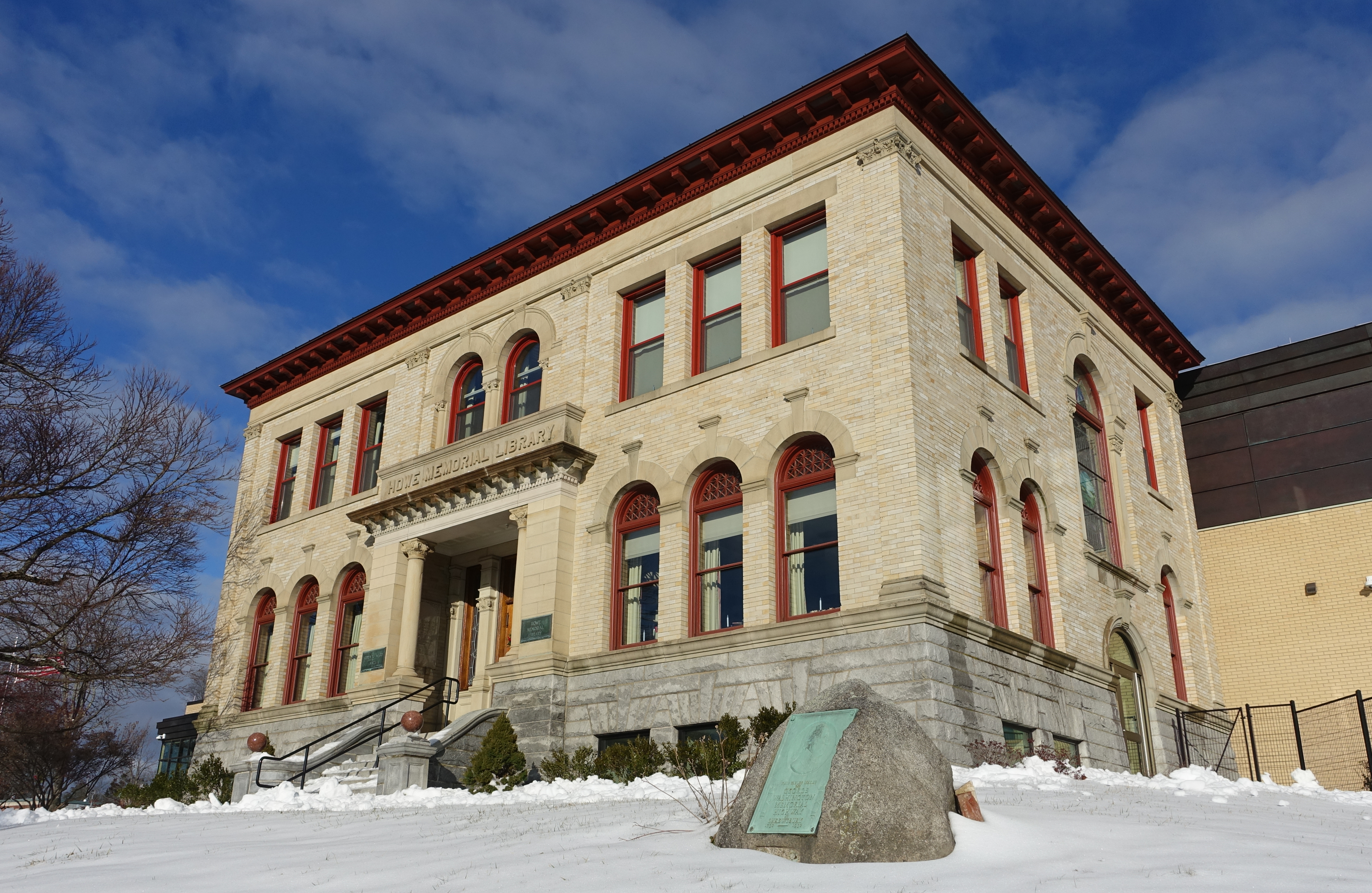
Shrewsbury Public Library

The Shrewsbury Public Library was established in 1872. The library was expanded in 1978, and a new 42,000-square-foot (3,900 m^{2}) library opened in 2016.

== Parks and recreation ==
- Ski Ward, a year-round recreational facility offering skiing, snowboarding, and snowtubing.
- Prospect Park, a 71-acre (29 ha) forest area with walking, running, and biking trails.
- Jordan Pond Recreational area, 0.8 miles (1.3 km) of recreational trails surrounding Jordan Pond
- Dean Park, a recreational area which includes 1.8 miles (2.9 km) of hiking trails.

== Government ==
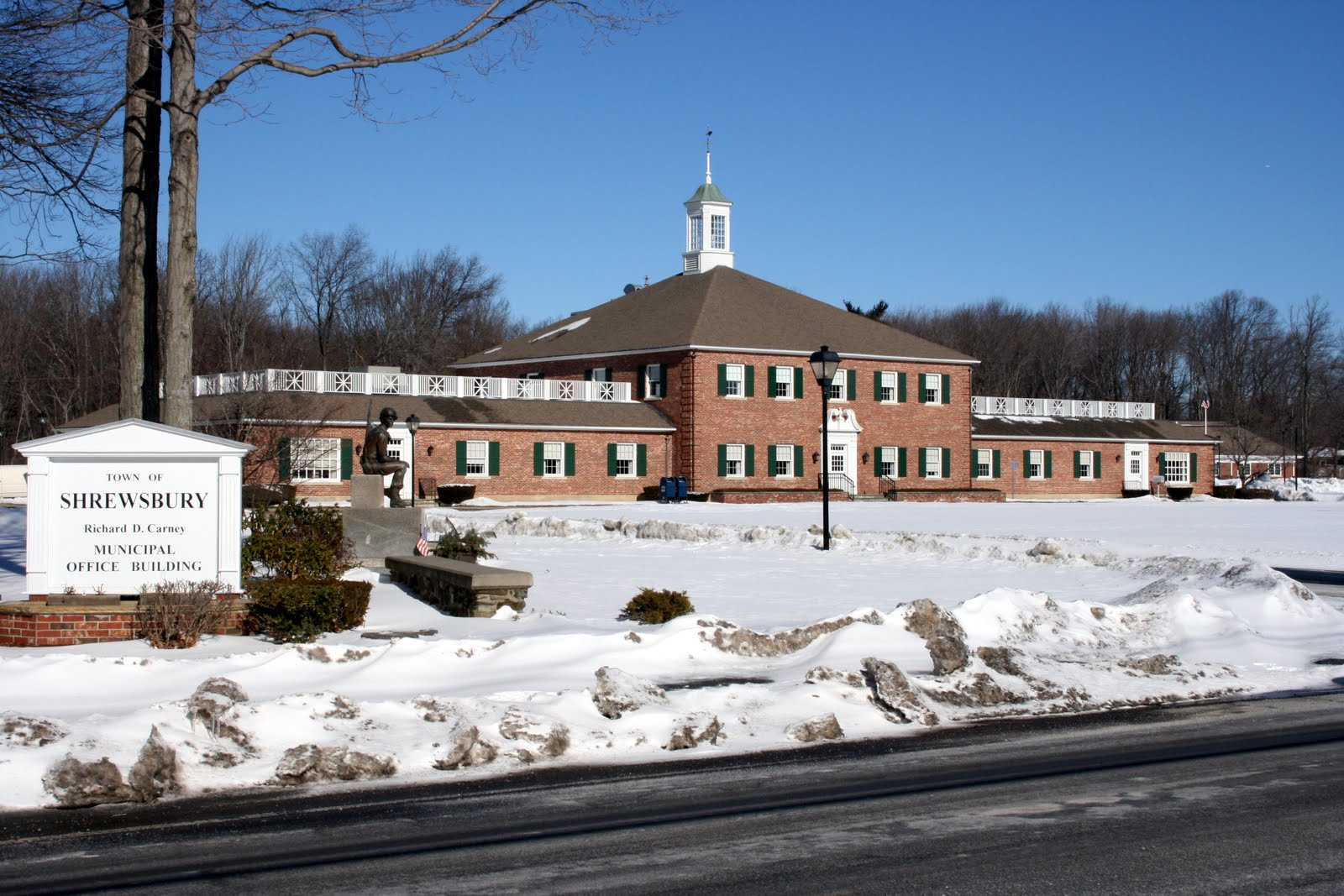
Town Hall

=== Town government ===
Shrewsbury is governed in the traditional New England style. Municipal elections are held on the first Tuesday in May. The legislative branch, a Representative Town Meeting, has 240 elected members. The executive branch has a five-member Select Board with three-year staggered terms, an appointed Town Manager, and other elected and appointed positions.

The Select Board is composed of Theresa H. Flynn (chair), Carlos A. Garcia (vice-chair), Michelle K. Conlin (clerk), Gregg Richards, and Anand Sharma. The Town Manager is Kevin J. Mizikar.

=== State and federal government ===
- State Representative: Hannah Kane (R—11th Worcester district)
- State Senator: Michael O. Moore (D—2nd Worcester district)
- Governor's Councilor: Paul Depalo (D)
- U.S. Representative: James McGovern (D—Massachusetts's 2nd congressional district)
- U.S. Senators: Elizabeth Warren (D), Ed Markey (D)

== Education ==
=== Public schools ===
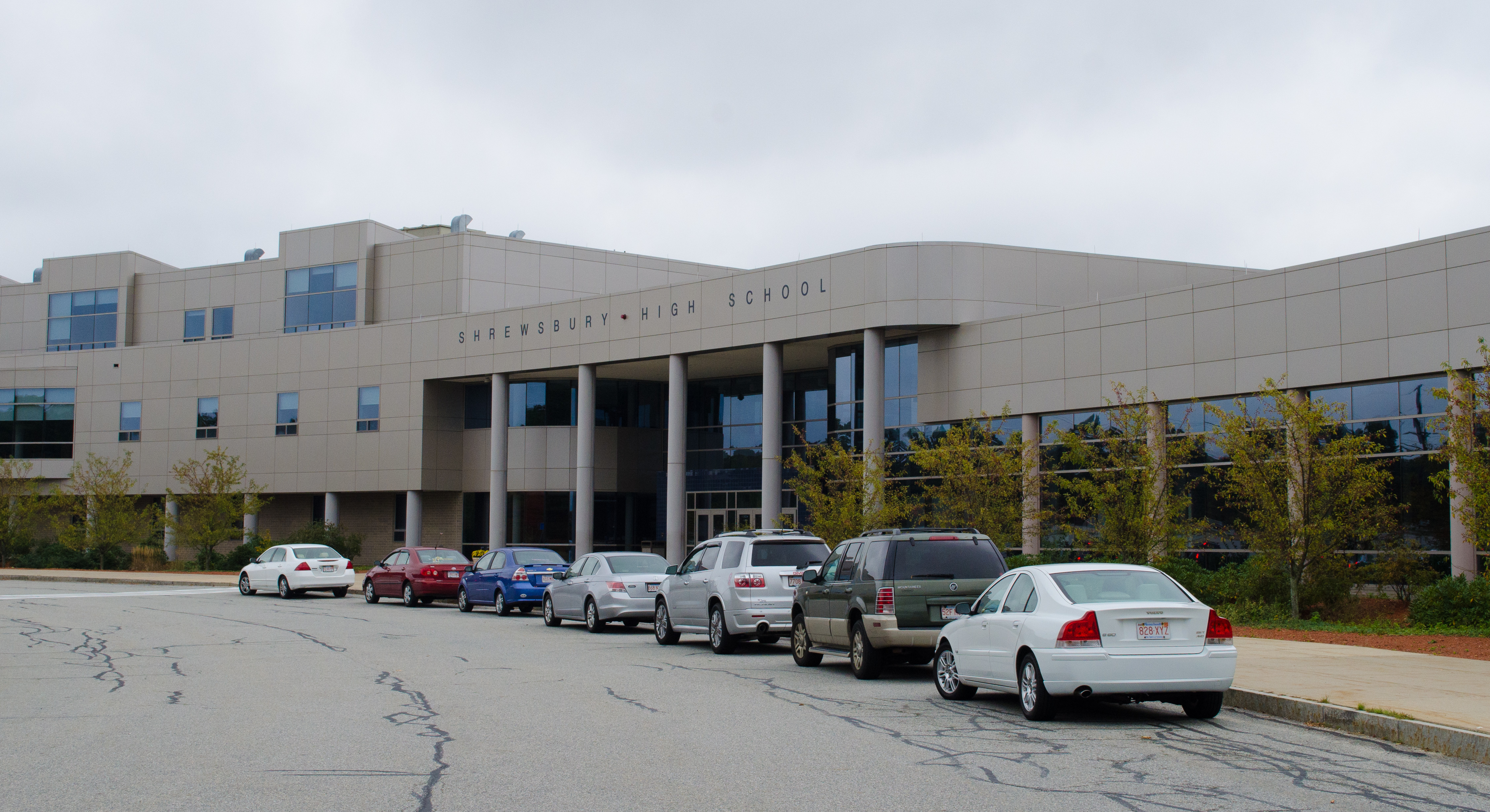
Shrewsbury High School

Shrewsbury Public Schools is the public school district in the town. Schools in the district include Shrewsbury High School, two middle schools, five elementary schools, and one preschool. These schools are Parker Road Preschool, Major Howard W. Beal School (grades K–4), Floral Street School (grades K–4), Spring Street School (grades K–4), Walter J. Paton Elementary School (grades K–4), Calvin Coolidge Elementary School (grades K–4), Sherwood Middle School (grades 5–6), Oak Middle School (grades 7–8), and the Shrewsbury High School.

=== Private schools ===
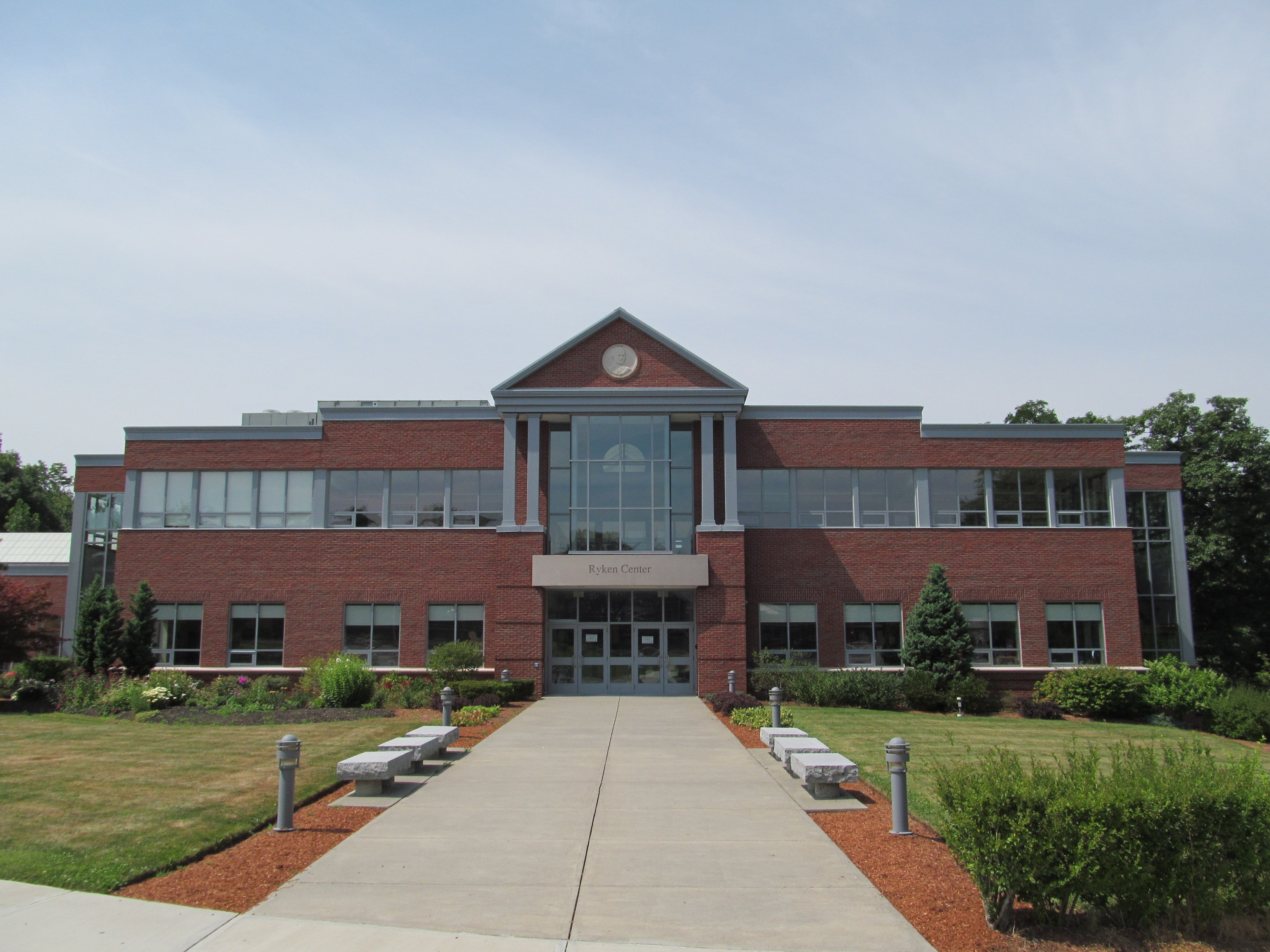
St. John's High School

Non-public schools in town include Shrewsbury Montessori, a private school offering programs for Pre-K through grade 6; St. Mary's School, a Catholic parochial school for Pre-K through grade 8; and Saint John's High School, a private Xaverian Brothers–sponsored high school.

== Media ==
=== Newspapers ===
- The Community Advocate

== Notable people ==
- Richard T. Antoun (1932–2009), professor emeritus of anthropology at Binghamton University; stabbed to death by a student
- Kenneth S. Apfel (born 1948), 13th Commissioner of Social Security
- Lillian Asplund (1906–2006), last American survivor of the Titanic sinking
- Matthew Beaton (born 1978), former Massachusetts state legislator
- Mike Birbiglia (born 1978), stand-up comedian
- Peter I. Blute (born 1956), Congressman representing Massachusetts's 3rd congressional district from 1993 to 1997
- Min Chueh Chang (1908–1991), co-inventor of the combined oral contraceptive pill and in-vitro fertilization
- Ralph Earl (1751–1801), American painter and landscape artist, known for his portrait of Roger Sherman
- Gardner Howe (1759–1854), Vermont state legislator
- Jonah Howe (1749–1826), Massachusetts state legislator
- Luke Knowlton (1738–1810), founder of Newfane, Vermont, Justice of the Vermont Supreme Court, member of the Vermont House of Representatives
- Jesse Livermore (1877–1940), pioneering stock trader
- Gregory Mcdonald (1937–2008), author of the Fletch series of novels
- Craig Mello (born 1960), winner of the 2006 Nobel Prize in Physiology or Medicine
- Francis Patrick O'Connor (1927–2007), Massachusetts Supreme Court Judge
- Robert Allan Ridley Parker (born 1936), director of the NASA Management Office at the Jet Propulsion Laboratory
- Charlie Pierce (born 1953), American writer/journalist, and panelist on NPR's Wait Wait... Don't Tell Me
- Karyn Polito (born 1966), Massachusetts state legislator and 72nd Lieutenant Governor of Massachusetts
- Simon Lizotte (born 1992), German American Professional Disc Golfer
- Teddy Quinlivan (born 1994), Transgender fashion model
- Artemas Ward (1727–1800), American Major General in the American Revolutionary War and a Congressman from Massachusetts, often characterized as the runner-up for George Washington's post
- Hannah Kane (born 1971), Massachusetts State Representative representing the 11th Worcester District
