= George M. Brooks =

American politician

George Merrick Brooks
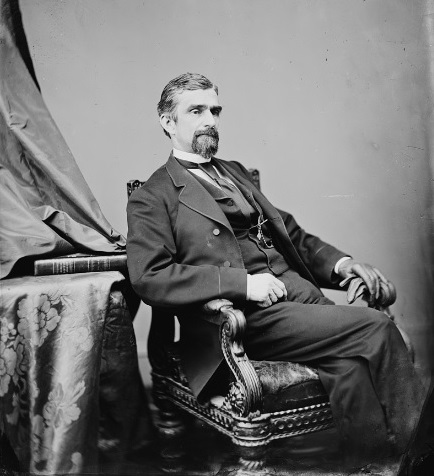

Member of the U.S. House of Representatives from Massachusetts's 7th district
- In office November 2, 1869 – May 13, 1872
- Preceded by: George S. Boutwell
- Succeeded by: Constantine C. Esty

Chairman of the Concord, Massachusetts Board of Selecmen

Member of the Concord, Massachusetts Board of Selecmen
- In office 1858–1858

Member of the Massachusetts Senate Fourth Middlesex District
- In office 1859–1859

Member of the Massachusetts House of Representatives
- In office 1858–1858

Personal details
- Born: July 26, 1824 Concord, Massachusetts
- Died: September 22, 1893 (aged 69) Concord, Massachusetts
- Party: Republican

George Merrick Brooks (July 26, 1824 – September 22, 1893) was an American lawyer and politician. He served as a U.S. representative from Massachusetts from 1869 to 1872 and also served as a state legislator and probate judge.

== Life and career ==
Brooks was born in Concord, Massachusetts, to parents Nathan Brooks and Mary Merrick Brooks, a leader in the Concord Female Anti-Slavery Society. Brooks attended an academy in Concord and a boarding school at Waltham. He graduated from Harvard University in 1844. He studied law, gained admission to the bar in 1847, and commenced practice in Concord. He served in the Massachusetts House of Representatives in 1858 and in the Massachusetts Senate in 1859. He also served on the Concord select board and on the board of the Concord Free Public Library.

Brooks was elected as a Republican to the Forty-first Congress to fill the vacancy caused by the resignation of George S. Boutwell. He was reelected to the Forty-second Congress and served from November 2, 1869, to May 13, 1872, when he resigned, having been appointed to a judicial position. He served as judge of probate for Middlesex County until his death in Concord, Massachusetts, September 22, 1893. He was interred in Sleepy Hollow Cemetery.

He was the brother-in-law of US Attorney General Ebenezer Rockwood Hoar, through the marriage of his sister Caroline Downes Brooks Hoar.

U.S. House of Representatives
Preceded by George S. Boutwell	Member of the U.S. House of Representatives from Massachusetts's 7th congressional district 1869–1872	Succeeded by Constantine C. Esty
