= Gov. George S. Boutwell House =

Historic house in Massachusetts, United States

- U.S. National Register of Historic Places
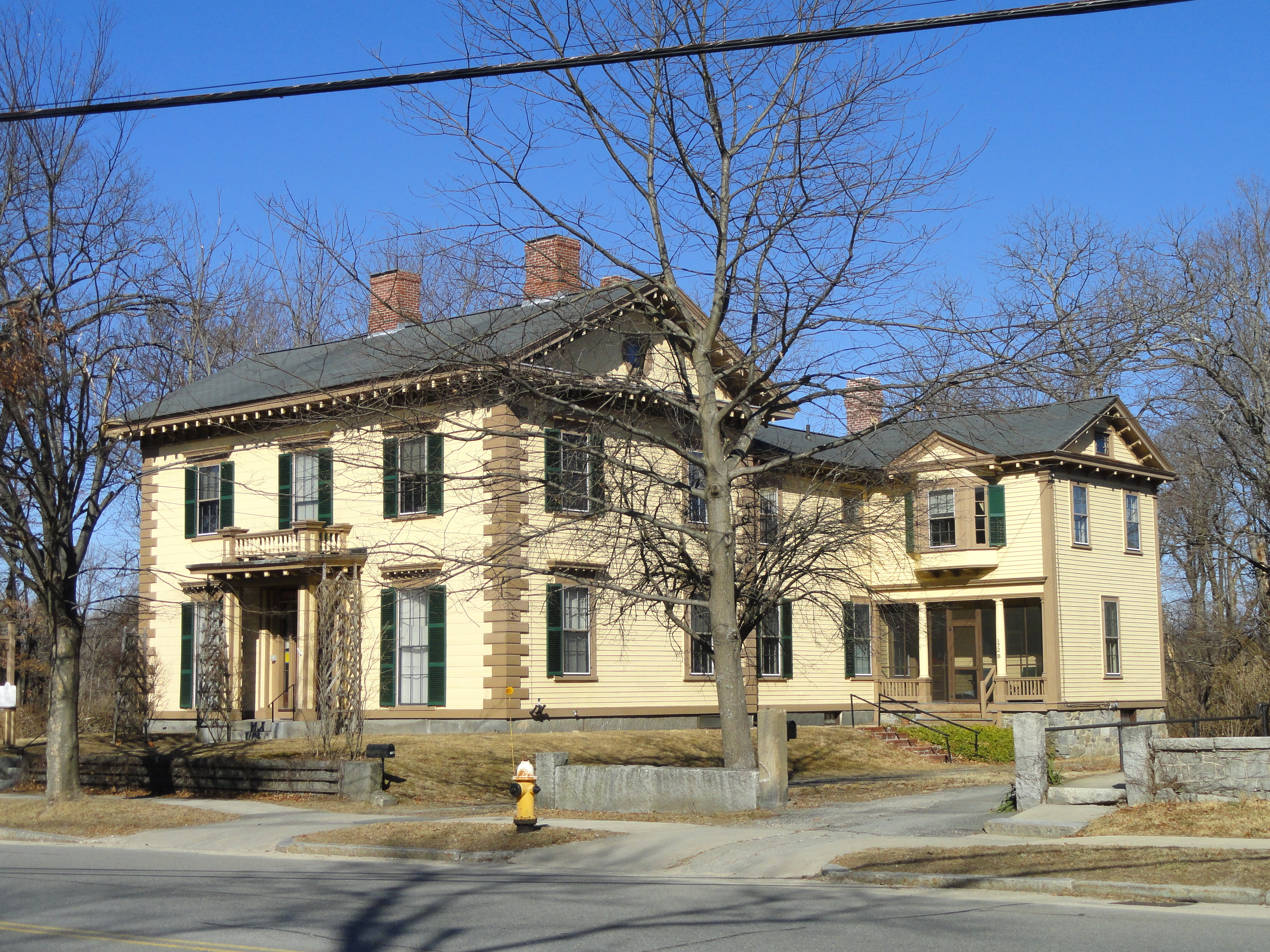
- Gov. George S. Boutwell House

- Location within Massachusetts Location within the United States
- Location: Groton, Massachusetts
- Coordinates: 42°36′29″N 71°34′17″W
- Built: 1851
- Architectural style: Greek Revival, Italianate
- Website: http://www.grotonhistoricalsociety.org
- NRHP reference No.: 04001431
- Added to NRHP: January 5, 2005

The Gov. George S. Boutwell House is a historic house at 172 Main Street in Groton, Massachusetts, USA, that was home to Governor George S. Boutwell. It was built in 1851 and added to the National Register of Historic Places in 2005. It is the current headquarters of the Groton Historical Society.

== Description and history ==
The Boutwell House is set on the north side of Main Street in the center of Groton. It is a 2 1/2-story wood-frame structure with Italianate styling, with a main block and a series of ells added in the late 19th century. Features of the main block's exterior include corner quoining, a water table at the base, and eaves decorated with brackets. The front facade is three bays wide, with a centered entrance sheltered by a deep flat portico supported by square posts.

The house was built in 1851 for George S. Boutwell who was Governor of Massachusetts at the time. He and his family were the only occupants of the house and when his daughter Georgianna died in 1933 she left the house to the historical society. Currently, the Boutwell House is used to both display period furniture and decorative arts and showcase special exhibits in the rotating exhibit gallery.

Light fills the front study inside the Greek Revival mansion, just the way it did a century and half ago when Gov. George Boutwell used to prepare his speeches there. The over-sized window looking over Station Avenue allowed him to see trains arrive from Boston. Boutwell would stand by the window and wave to guests getting off the train. Downstairs, inside the crimson-walled drawing room, Boutwell would entertain federal and state officials and dignitaries, including President Ulysses S. Grant for a night in 1869.

In 2010, the Boutwell House suffered two very serious water pipe failures which flooded portions of the museum's exhibition and work areas. The Groton Historical Society's Board of Directors sought and obtained both a Community Preservation Act grant for $176,525 which was unanimously approved at Groton Town Meeting in April 2013, and a Cultural Facilities Fund grant for $79,000 awarded in November 2012 from the Massachusetts Cultural Council. Both of these grants were for physical renovations including new wiring and plumbing, plaster replacement, a fire suppression system, and a new furnace. The first round of work was completed and the house was reopened on October 5, 2013.

== See also ==
- National Register of Historic Places listings in Middlesex County, Massachusetts
