= 1849–50 Massachusetts gubernatorial election =

- November 12, 1849 (popular election); January 7, 1850 (legislative vote)
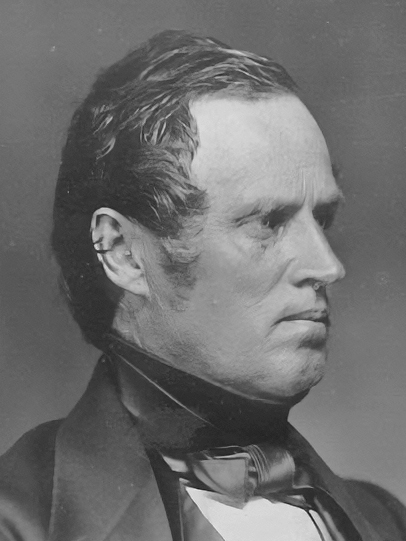

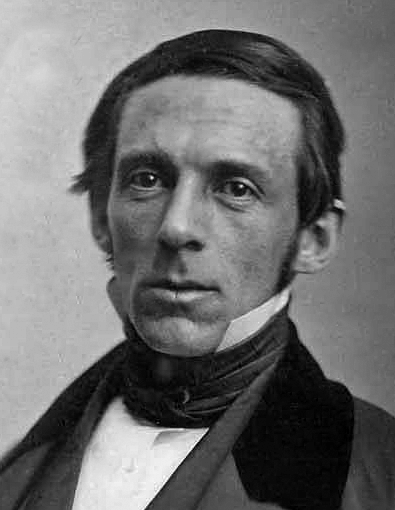

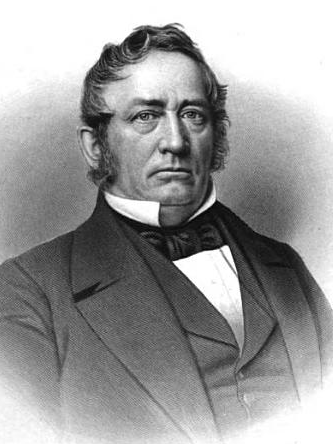
Nominee	George N. Briggs	George S. Boutwell	Stephen C. Phillips
Party	Whig	Democratic	Free Soil
Popular vote	54,009	30,040	25,247
Percentage	49.33%	27.44%	23.06%
Senate vote	23; 65.71%	12; 34.29%	Did not qualify
- Popular election results by county Briggs: 30–40% 40–50% 50–60% 60–70%
Governor before election
George N. Briggs
Whig
Elected Governor
George N. Briggs
Whig

The 1849–50 Massachusetts gubernatorial election consisted of an initial popular election held on November 12, 1849 that was followed by a legislative vote held on January 7, 1850. The ultimate task of electing the governor had been placed before the Massachusetts General Court because no candidate received the majority of the vote required for a candidate to be elected through the popular election. Incumbent Whig Governor George N. Briggs won the legislative vote and was therefore elected, defeating Democratic nominee George S. Boutwell and Free Soil nominee Stephen C. Phillips.

== General election ==
=== Candidates ===
- George N. Briggs, Whig, incumbent governor
- George S. Boutwell, Democratic, state banking commissioner, former state representative
- Stephen C. Phillips, Free Soil, former U.S. representative, former mayor of Salem, Massachusetts

=== Results ===
1849 Massachusetts gubernatorial election
Party	Candidate	Votes	%	±%
Whig	George N. Briggs	54,009	49.33%	
Democratic	George S. Boutwell	30,040	27.44%	
Free Soil	Stephen C. Phillips	25,247	23.06%	
Scattering		193	0.18%	
Majority		23,969	21.89%	
Turnout		109,849		
Whig hold		Swing		

=== Legislative election ===
As no candidate received a majority of the vote, the Massachusetts General Court was required to decide the election. Under Article III of the Constitution of Massachusetts, the House of Representatives chose two candidates from the top four vote-getters, the Senate electing the governor from the House's choice.

Contemporary sources only record the House's vote as Briggs 157, Phillips 63, Boutwell 59, which would result in the nomination of Briggs but not Boutwell.

The legislative election was held on January 7, 1850.

Legislative election
Party	Candidate	Votes	%
Whig	George N. Briggs	23	65.71%
Democratic	George S. Boutwell	12	34.29%
Turnout		35	
Whig hold			
