= Stephen C. Phillips =

American politician (1801-1857)

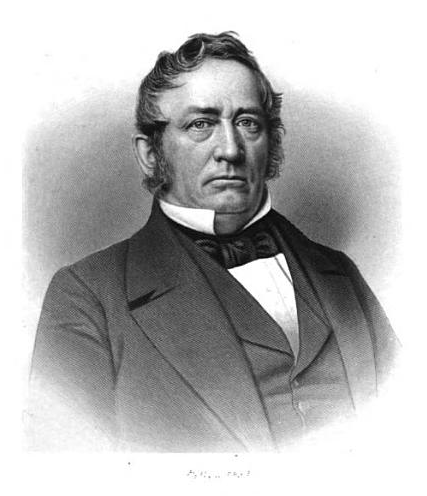

Member of the U.S. House of Representatives from Massachusetts's 2nd district
- In office December 1, 1834 – September 28, 1838
- Preceded by: Rufus Choate
- Succeeded by: Leverett Saltonstall

2nd Mayor of Salem, Massachusetts
- In office 1838 – March 1842
- Preceded by: Leverett Saltonstall
- Succeeded by: Stephen Palfray Webb

Member of the Massachusetts Senate
- In office 1830

Member of the Massachusetts House of Representatives
- In office 1824-1829

Personal details
- Born: Stephen Clarendon Phillips; November 4, 1801 Salem, Massachusetts
- Died: June 26, 1857 (aged 55) St. Lawrence River, near Quebec City, Quebec
- Party: Whig, Free Soil
- Spouse(s): Jane Appleton Peele, m. November 6, 1822, d. December 19, 1837; Margaret Mason Peele, m. September 3, 1838, d. July 15, 1883
- Children: Stephen H. Phillips
- Education: Harvard

Stephen Clarendon Phillips (November 4, 1801 – June 26, 1857) was a U.S. representative from Massachusetts.

Phillips was born in Salem, Massachusetts, to Stephen and Dorcas (Woodbridge) Phillips. He was a descendant of Rev. George Phillips of Watertown, the progenitor of the New England Phillips family in America. He graduated from Harvard University in 1819. Phillips' engaged in mercantile pursuits in Salem, and was a member of the Massachusetts House of Representatives from 1824 to 1829. He then served in the Massachusetts State Senate in 1830.

Phillips was elected as a National Republican to the Twenty-third Congress to fill the vacancy caused by the resignation of Rufus Choate. He was reelected as a National Republican to the Twenty-fourth Congress, and elected as a Whig to the Twenty-fifth Congress serving from December 1, 1834, to September 28, 1838, when he resigned.

Phillips was mayor of Salem from 1838 to 1842, but was defeated as the Free Soil candidate for governor in 1848 and 1849. He engaged in the lumber business in Canada. He perished in the burning of the steamer Montreal on the St. Lawrence River on June 26, 1857, near Quebec City. His body was never found, but there is a monument to him in Harmony Grove Cemetery in Salem.

Party political offices
First	Free Soil nominee for Governor of Massachusetts; 1848, 1849, 1850	Succeeded by John G. Palfrey
U.S. House of Representatives
Preceded by Rufus Choate	Member of the U.S. House of Representatives from Massachusetts's 2nd congressional district December 1, 1834 – September 28, 1838	Succeeded by Leverett Saltonstall
Political offices
Preceded by Leverett Saltonstall	2nd Mayor of Salem, Massachusetts; 1838–1842	Succeeded by Stephen Palfrey Webb
