= 1850–51 Massachusetts gubernatorial election =

- November 11, 1850 (popular); January 11, 1851 (legislative)
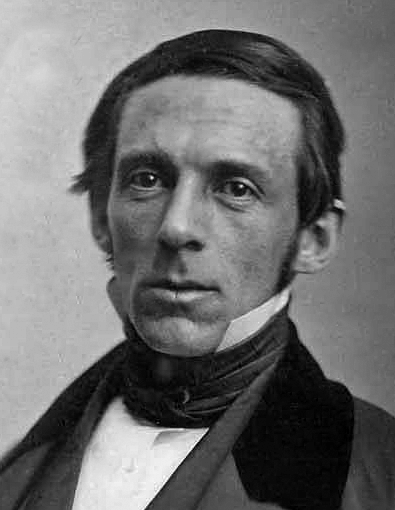

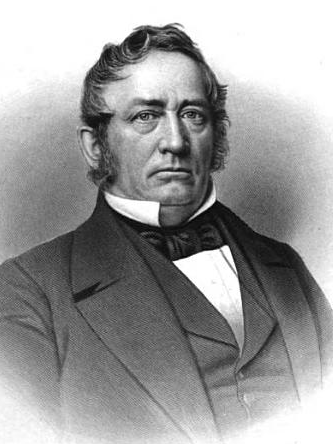

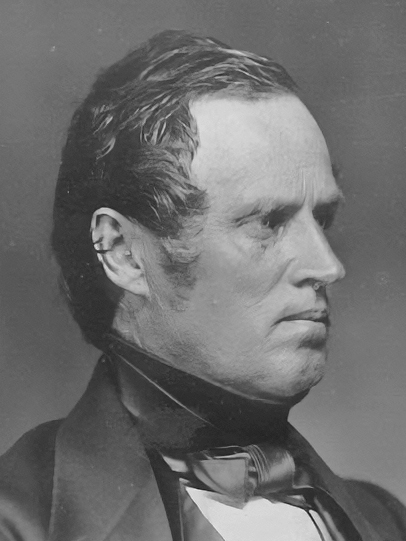
Nominee	George S. Boutwell	Stephen C. Phillips	George N. Briggs
Party	Democratic	Free Soil	Whig
Electoral vote	32	0	Did not qualify
Popular vote	36,023	27,636	56.778
Percentage	29.68%	22.77%	46.78%
- Popular election results by county Briggs: 40–50% 50–60% 60–70% Phillips: 30–40%
Governor before election
George N. Briggs
Whig
Elected Governor
George S. Boutwell
Democratic

The 1850–51 Massachusetts gubernatorial election consisted of an initial popular held on November 11, 1850 that was followed by a legislative vote that was conducted on January 11, 1851. It saw the election of Democratic Party nominee George S. Boutwell. The ultimate task of electing the governor had been placed before the Massachusetts General Court because no candidate received the majority of the vote required for a candidate to be elected through the popular election.

Incumbent governor George N. Briggs, a member of the Whig Party, was running for an eighth term in office. Despite winning a plurality in the general election with a large lead over the other candidates, he did not win election because he failed to secure the outright majority required to be elected through the popular vote and ultimately did not advance to the subsequent legislative vote when the House did not select him as a candidate for consideration by the Senate. In the legislative vote, the state's Democratic Party-Free Soil Party coalition, who combined held a majority in the legislature, successfully partnered to elect the Democratic nominee, businessman George S. Boutwell.

== Background ==
In 1848, the new abolitionist and pro-labor Free Soil Party, which drew support from both Whigs and Democrats and members of the Liberty Party, was founded. Whig George N. Briggs won the 1848 and 1849 elections with a plurality of the popular vote. As no candidate received a majority in either race, it was the majority-Whig legislature that returned Briggs to office each time. In their respective 1849 conventions, Democrats embraced anti-slavery resolutions and the Free Soilers adopting reformist planks on state issues, though a formal anti-Whig alliance was precluded by their differences on national issues.

In 1850, the United States Congress passed the Fugitive Slave Act and Compromise of 1850, increasing anti-slavery agitation in Massachusetts and energizing opposition to the remaining Whigs, who tended to be conservatives who either reconciled with the institution of slavery or as textile manufacturers even directly profited from cheap cotton and in turn, slave labor.

During his failed campaign for governor in 1849, Democratic nominee George S. Boutwell became acquainted with Free Soil Party leaders Charles Sumner and Henry Wilson. Despite opposition from hardline members of their parties, the leaders resolved to form an alliance to unseat the Whig establishment. As part of this agreement, Free Soilers agreed to support Boutwell for governor and fellow Democrat Nathaniel Prentice Banks for Speaker of the Massachusetts House, while Sumner would be elected U.S. Senator and Wilson would become President of the Massachusetts Senate. Both parties would run a unified legislative ticket but continue to run opposing tickets for federal and local office.

The coalition agreement met opposition from some more conservative ex-Whig Free Soilers, such as Charles Francis Adams, Samuel Hoar, Richard Henry Dana Jr., John Palfrey, and gubernatorial nominee Stephen Clarendon Phillips, all of whom preferred a narrow anti-slavery focus. These men either outright opposed the Democratic reform agenda or argued that it distracted from that mission.

== General election ==
=== Candidates ===
- George N. Briggs, incumbent governor since 1844 (Whig)
- George S. Boutwell, Groton businessman and nominee for governor in 1849 (Democratic)
- Francis Cogswell (independent)
- Stephen C. Phillips, former Whig U.S. representative and mayor of Salem (Free Soil)

=== Campaign ===
The coalition power-sharing agreement apportioning state offices was not made public knowledge during the campaign.

Though the battle lines were redrawn, the campaign was fought largely on familiar class issues. Whigs assailed the coalition triumvirate of Boutwell, Wilson, and Banks as radically plebeian, while the coalition pressed for labor reform and decried the textile magnates as oppressive. Though the Whigs fought a traditional campaign focused on securing a majority of the popular vote, the coalition worked behind the scenes to court country town voters in the Boston area.

=== Results ===
1850 Massachusetts gubernatorial election
Party	Candidate	Votes	%	±%
Whig	George N. Briggs (incumbent)	56,778	46.78%	▼2.45
Democratic	George S. Boutwell	36,023	29.68%	▲2.24
Free Soil	Stephen C. Phillips	27,636	22.77%	▼0.29
Independent	Francis Cogswell	689	0.57%	N/A
Write-in		239	0.20%	▲0.02
Total votes		121,365	100.00%	

The coalition swept to large majorities in both houses of the General Court.

== Legislative vote ==
The Massachusetts House of Representatives certified the popular returns on January 12. The House voted to nominate Boutwell and Phillips for consideration by the Senate. On the first House ballot, Boutwell defeated Briggs 218–171. On the second, Phillips defeated Briggs 216–170. In the Massachusetts State Senate, Boutwell was elected unanimously with 32 votes with three blanks.

== Aftermath ==
Upon their entry to office and apportionment of state offices, the coalition faced heavy blowback. Future U.S. Supreme Court Justice Benjamin R. Curtis, then the president of the Massachusetts Bar Association, circulated a letter calling for criminal conspiracy charges against Sumner, Wilson, and Boutwell; most Whig legislators signed the letter, but the party declined to call for the election to be overturned.

Wilson and Banks were also elevated to Speaker and Senate President, but Sumner's election to the U.S. Senate was far more contentious due to opposition by conservative Democrats led by former Whig Caleb Cushing, who joined with the Whig minority. The election took several months to reach a conclusion, with Sumner prevailing by only one vote in the House. Sumner blamed Boutwell's failure to intercede for his difficulty and would continue to blame Boutwell for the coalition's eventual collapse.

== See also ==
- 1850 Massachusetts legislature
