= George S. Boutwell =

American politician and lawyer (1818–1905)

George Boutwell
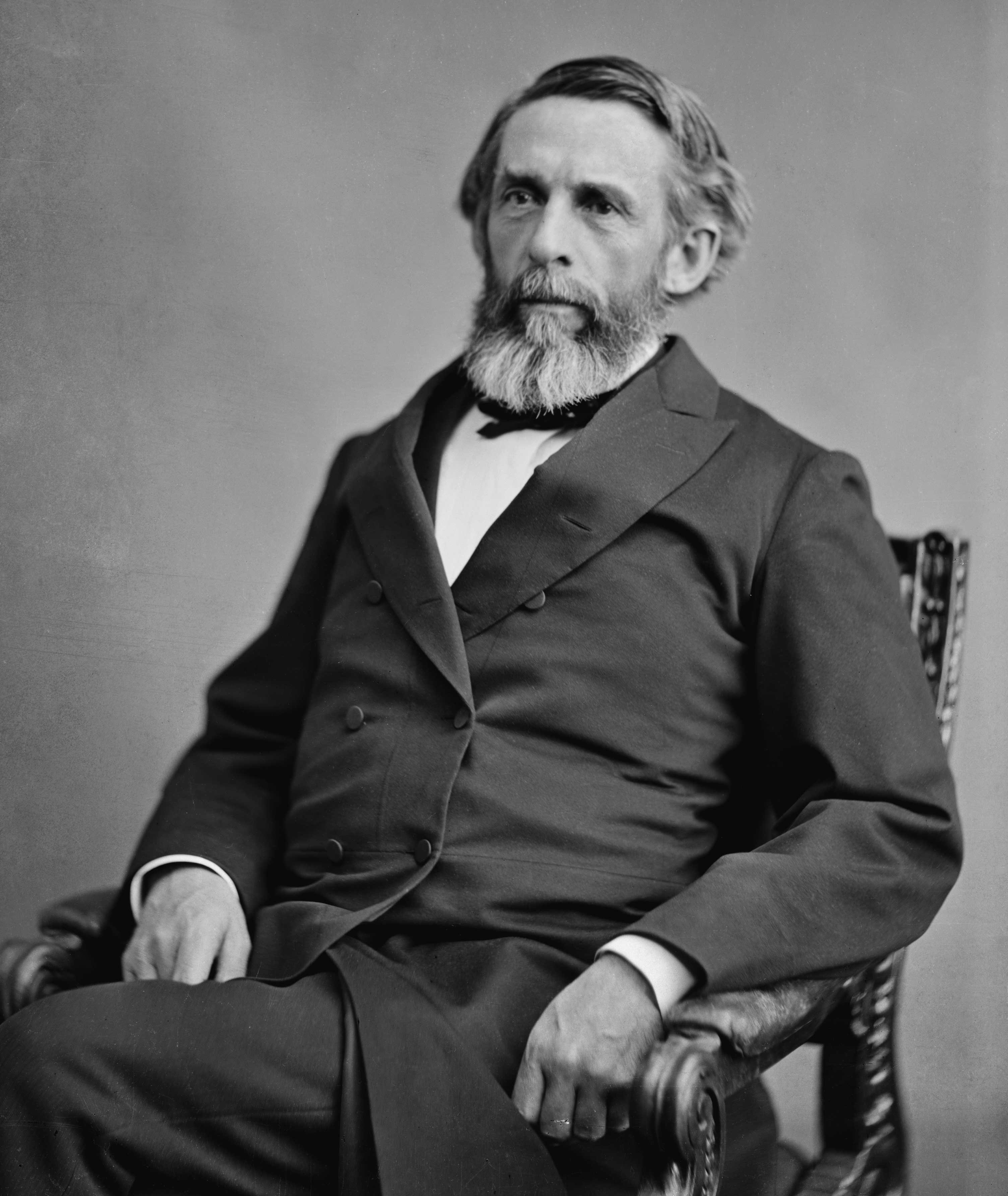
- Boutwell, c. 1870–1880

United States Senator from Massachusetts
- In office March 17, 1873 – March 3, 1877
- Preceded by: Henry Wilson
- Succeeded by: George Hoar

28th United States Secretary of the Treasury
- In office March 12, 1869 – March 16, 1873
- President: Ulysses S. Grant
- Preceded by: Hugh McCulloch
- Succeeded by: William Richardson

Member of the U.S. House of Representatives from Massachusetts's 7th district
- In office March 4, 1863 – March 12, 1869
- Preceded by: Daniel W. Gooch
- Succeeded by: George M. Brooks

1st Commissioner of Internal Revenue
- In office July 17, 1862 – March 4, 1863
- President: Abraham Lincoln
- Preceded by: Position established
- Succeeded by: Joseph J. Lewis

20th Governor of Massachusetts
- In office January 11, 1851 – January 14, 1853
- Lieutenant: Henry W. Cushman
- Preceded by: George N. Briggs
- Succeeded by: John H. Clifford

Massachusetts State Banking Commissioner
- In office 1849–1851
- Governor: George N. Briggs

Member of the Massachusetts House of Representatives
- In office 1847–1850
- In office 1841–1843

Personal details
- Born: George Sewall Boutwell; January 28, 1818 Brookline, Massachusetts, U.S.
- Died: February 27, 1905 (aged 87) Groton, Massachusetts, U.S.
- Party: Democratic (Before 1855); Republican (1855–1898)
- Spouse: Sarah Thayer
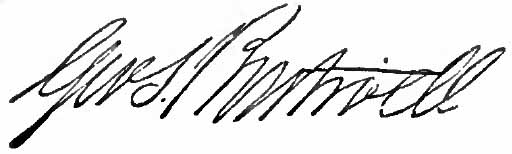
- Signature

George Sewall Boutwell (January 28, 1818 – February 27, 1905) was an American politician, lawyer, and statesman from Massachusetts. He served as Secretary of the Treasury under President Ulysses S. Grant, the 20th governor of Massachusetts, a U.S. senator and representative from Massachusetts, and the first Commissioner of Internal Revenue under President Abraham Lincoln. He was a leader in the impeachment of President Andrew Johnson and served as a House manager (prosecutor) in the impeachment trial.

Boutwell, an abolitionist, is known primarily for his leadership in the formation of the Republican Party, and his championship of African American citizenship and suffrage rights during Reconstruction. As a congressman, he was instrumental in the drafting and passage of the Fourteenth and Fifteenth Amendments to the United States Constitution. As Secretary of the Treasury, he made needed reforms in the Treasury Department after the chaos of the American Civil War and the impeachment trial of President Andrew Johnson. He controversially reduced the national debt by selling Treasury gold and using greenbacks to buy up Treasury bonds, a process that created a cash shortage. Boutwell and President Grant thwarted an attempt to corner the gold market in September 1869 by releasing $4,000,000 (~$85.8 million in 2025) of gold into the economy. As a U.S. senator, Boutwell sponsored the Civil Rights Act of 1875 and was chair of a Senate select committee investigating white supremacist violence against Black citizens and their white Republican Party supporters during the 1875 Mississippi state election campaign.

In 1877, President Rutherford B. Hayes appointed Boutwell commissioner to codify the Revised Statutes of the United States and in 1880 to serve as United States counsel before the French and American Claims Commission. He also practiced international law in other diplomatic fora. At the turn of the 20th century, he abandoned the Republican Party, opposed the acquisition of the Philippines, and in 1900 supported Democrat William Jennings Bryan for president.

In 2025, the "first major biography" (according to its dust jacket) of Boutwell was published.

== Early life ==
George S. Boutwell was born on January 28, 1818, in Brookline, Massachusetts. According to his autobiography, Boutwell was raised on his family's farm in Lunenburg and attended public schools until the age of seventeen. During the summer months he worked barefooted, tending oxen and picking chestnuts. He studied arithmetic, algebra, geometry, and Latin grammar. From 1830 to 1835, Boutwell worked as an apprentice and clerk for Simeon Heywood, who owned a palm leaf hat store. He worked briefly as a teacher at Pound Hill, Shirley Massachusetts, a nearby town, and finished his primary school education in February 1835.

From 1835 to 1838, Boutwell worked as a clerk and shopkeeper in Groton, Massachusetts. In 1836, he began to study law under attorney Bradford Russell, whose office was above the store where he clerked. Boutwell did not take the bar exam or practice law until many years later. In 1838, the shop owner offered Boutwell a partnership in the shop. While Boutwell ran the store, he began a personal regimen of reading and writing in an effort to make up for his decision not to attend college.

Boutwell made his public career debut in 1839 as a pension agent for widows of the American Revolutionary War, which had ended in 1783. He traveled to Washington, D.C., and was impressed by Daniel Webster. After talking with an enslaved Black woman whose youngest child had been sold to Louisiana, Boutwell became dedicated to the anti-slavery cause.

Boutwell married Sarah Adelia Thayer on July 8, 1841. She was the daughter of Nathan Thayer from Hollis, New Hampshire. They had two children: Georgianna (born May 18, 1843) and Francis (born February 26, 1847).

== Political career (1839–1861) ==
Entering politics as a Democrat and a supporter of Martin Van Buren, Boutwell was appointed head of the Groton post office by his business partner, who had been appointed postmaster. Boutwell's first entry into elective politics was a successful run for the Groton School Committee as a Temperance Party candidate; he sat on that committee for many years. The success prompted him to run for the state legislature on the same party's ticket, but as the candidate of a small third party, he lost badly. In 1840, he won the Democratic Party nomination, despite temperance opinions that were "offensive to many", but lost in a Whig landslide. He won on his third try, defeating incumbent John Boynton in 1841. He won the next two annual elections and lost in 1844 and 1845. He was returned to the state legislature in the 1846 election and served from 1847 to 1850. His elective successes, sometimes in the face of major Whig victories statewide, highlighted Boutwell's potential, and brought him into the Democratic Party's leadership circles. He sat on the judiciary and finance committees, where he gained a reputation for thorough research into legislation, and advocated positions favoring free trade, restraint of the money supply, and increased taxes for spending on education and other reforms. He supported the Mexican–American War, which, unlike other people at the time, he did not believe was motivated by a desire to expand slavery.

While in the state House of Representatives, Boutwell ran three times for a seat in the United States House of Representatives, losing by significant margins to his Whig opponents. In 1848, he was considered for the Democratic nomination for governor, placing third at the nominating convention. In 1849, he was appointed state banking commissioner by Whig Governor George N. Briggs, a position in which he inspected bank charters that were subject to renewal. In this position, he gained a wealth of experience in matters of banking and finance.

=== Massachusetts governor ===
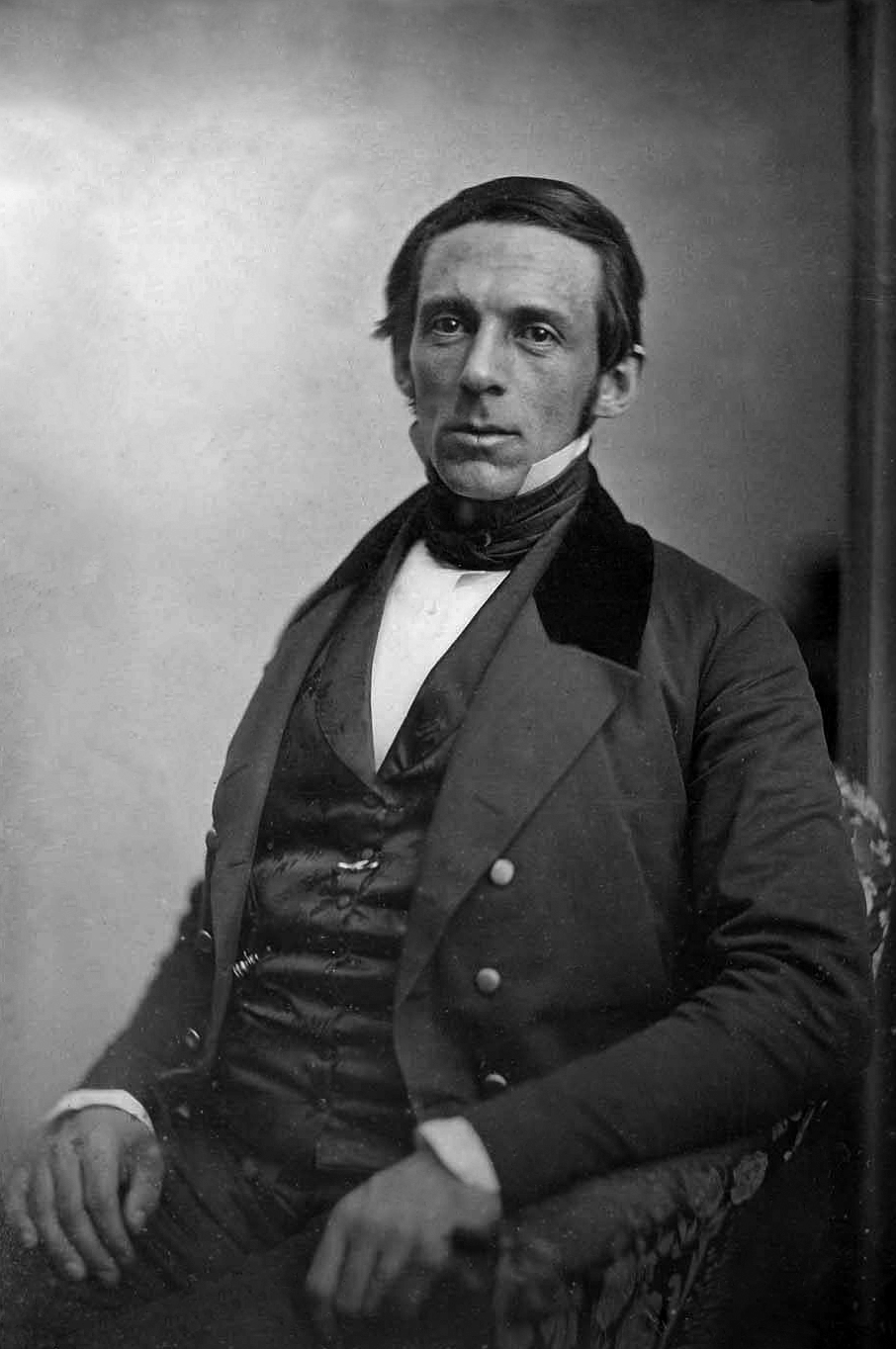
Boutwell circa 1851. Daguerreotype by Southworth & Hawes

Throughout the 1840s, advocates of the abolition of slavery grew to become a significant force in Massachusetts politics. Outrage over the extension of slavery into territories acquired in the Mexican–American War increased the popularity of the Free Soil Party, but they and the Democrats were unable to unite to unseat the Whigs who dominated state politics until 1850. In 1849, Boutwell won the Democratic nomination for governor. Because no candidate won a majority, the Whig-controlled legislature decided the election, choosing the incumbent Briggs. The campaign brought Boutwell into close contact with Charles Sumner and Henry Wilson, leaders of the state Free Soil Party. The parties flirted with the idea of a coalition, with the Democrats adopting an antislavery platform.

In 1850, passage of the Compromise of 1850, in particular the Fugitive Slave Act, sparked further outrage, and the Democrats and Free Soilers were able to agree to a coalition. On the Democratic side, Boutwell and Nathaniel Prentice Banks agreed with Free Soilers Sumner and Wilson on a division of offices should the coalition win. The key to their success was control of the state legislature, which would decide the election if no gubernatorial candidate won a majority of the popular vote.

Both parties worked to bring out the vote in rural areas sympathetic to their cause. Although Governor Briggs won a plurality of the popular vote (57,000 out of 120,000 votes cast), he did not win a majority, and the legislature was controlled by the coalition. Pursuant to the terms of the deal, Boutwell was elected governor, Banks was made Speaker of the House, and Wilson was elected Senate President. Sumner's election to the U.S. Senate, also part of the bargain, was contested by conservative Democrats, but the coalition eventually prevailed in electing him. Boutwell was criticized by Free Soilers for taking a hands-off approach to the contentious election of Sumner, neither supporting nor opposing him during the balloting in the state senate. Sumner later accused Boutwell of preventing a more permanent fusion of the two parties.

In the 1851 election, the results were similar, despite efforts by the Whigs to drive wedges between the coalition members, and Boutwell was again elected by the legislature after the Whig candidate won a plurality. That election exposed cracks in the coalition, principally on slavery. When Boutwell decided not stand for reelection in 1852, the Whigs regained control of the legislature and elected John H. Clifford to the governor's chair.

On May 26, 1851, Boutwell was elected as a member of the Ancient and Honorable Artillery Company of Massachusetts.

In Boutwell's first term as governor, both houses of the legislature were controlled by the coalition, and its substantial reform agenda was enacted, including election by secret ballot, although the terms did not satisfy all of the secrecy rules of an Australian ballot, and plurality voting under some conditions. The state legislature's seats were changed from town-based allocations to legislative districts that were not based on town boundaries. Laws governing the issuance of bank charters were streamlined, and the Harvard Board of Overseers was reorganized. Boutwell also engaged in a wholesale reassignment of patronage jobs in the state, which had all been filled with Whigs. In his second term, Whigs controlled the House of Representatives, and were thus able to thwart most of the reform agenda. Boutwell's call to increase taxes for spending on education, prisons, and mental hospitals went unheeded, but the legislature was passed a call for a constitutional convention to discuss long-standing demands for changes to the state constitution. A "Maine law" temperance reform bill was also approved, but Boutwell was criticized by the Whigs for vetoing the first version of it and then signing the second, allegedly under pressure from Free Soilers.

=== Constitutional Convention and Republican Party ===
Boutwell was elected a delegate to the Massachusetts Constitutional Convention of 1853. He opposed the election of judges and the abolition of the Governor's Council, and supported the elimination of any poll tax requirements for voting. He served on the committee responsible for drafting the proposals that the Convention submitted to the voters for approval, and was disappointed when all of those proposals were rejected in the ensuing statewide referendum.

The triumph of slavery will perpetuate confusion and discord among the states, civil war in the territories ...

— Boutwell in the 1860 Massachusetts Republican Convention's Address To The People

After the convention, Boutwell took up the study of law in the office of Joel Giles, a patent lawyer from Groton. He was retained by Middlesex County to oppose the formation of a new county out of parts of western Middlesex and northern Worcester Counties. He helped found the Groton Public Library, and continued to be active on the Groton School Committee. In 1855, he was appointed secretary of the state Board of Education, a post he held for five years. He was admitted to the Massachusetts bar in 1862. He also served as state librarian as party of his role as secretary of the board of education.

In the aftermath of the coalition breakup in 1852 and the failure of the 1853 convention, Massachusetts political parties broke down into factional interests. In August 1855, four major factions were holding meetings in a Boston hotel, attempting to find common ground for the upcoming state election. Boutwell convinced the groups to attend a grand meeting, at which he argued that they should form a "union against slavery". Out of this and related activity the state's Republican Party was born. Despite his role in its early formation, Boutwell remained somewhat apart from the organization because of his job at the Board of Education. He did however continue to speak out against slavery, noting that the nation was embarking on a "period of intense trial", and that "people will make war" over slavery. In 1860 he chaired the Republican state convention and supported Republican candidates for office.

== Early Civil War years ==
Boutwell attended the Peace Conference of 1861 in Washington, D.C., which attempted to prevent the impending Civil War, and served as a liaison between the federal government and Massachusetts Governor John Albion Andrew in April 1861. In the peace conference, he angrily rejected Southern proposals favoring the extension of slavery and its enforcement in northern states, arguing that "the Union is not worth preserving" if such measures are needed to do so.

In June and July 1862, Boutwell served on a military commission in the Department of War, investigating irregularities in the quartermaster's department of General John C. Frémont, who commanded the Union Army's Department of the West. Assistant Quartermaster Reuben Hatch, whose brother was a political supporter of President Abraham Lincoln, had been defrauding the department, and the commission was established on Lincoln's order to forestall a court martial. Boutwell spent two months in the army camp at Cairo, Illinois, under conditions he described as "disagreeable to an extent that cannot be realized easily" because of flooding and unsanitary conditions. The commission cleared Hatch.

In July 1862, while he was still in Cairo, Boutwell was appointed the first Commissioner of Internal Revenue by President Lincoln. He spent his eight months in that post organizing the new Internal Revenue Bureau. He oversaw the growth of the bureau to some 4,000 employees, the largest department in the government, and Secretary of the Treasury Salmon P. Chase praised him for having the "highest obtainable ability and integrity".

On August 6, 1862, at the "Great War Meeting" at the U.S. Capitol in Washington, D.C., Boutwell gave a speech titled, "Treason the Fruit of Slavery", in which he said that, if not for slavery, "there would have been no treason; and when slavery should cease to exist, there will be no traitors. That is the beginning and the end of the war, slavery in the beginning, freedom in the end. This statement was notable because Boutwell was the only one of the eleven speakers, including Abraham Lincoln, at the meeting who mentioned slavery or emancipation. At the time, Lincoln knew that he would issue the preliminary Emancipation Proclamation, but he considered it too soon to advocate for emancipation himself. "Nonetheless, a solid case can be made that the president himself knew in advance and approved what Boutwell would say, as one part of the process of molding public opinion in support of the dramatic act he took when he announced the [preliminary] Emancipation Proclamation on September 22".

Boutwell decided in 1862 to run for the United States Congress. The campaign was dominated by the issue of emancipation, which Boutwell strongly advocated. He won a comfortable (55–40%) victory over Charles R. Train, a conservative former Republican. He resigned as Internal Revenue commissioner in March 1863 to take his seat in the U.S. House.

== U.S. Congressman ==
Boutwell came to the House of Representatives already celebrated for his financial expertise and quickly gained a national reputation as a Radical Republican. A reporter noted that with his first day of service on a committee, he became recognized as one of the most promising freshmen. He wrote:

A practical matter-of-fact man. A dark-skinned man, dark-eyed, dark-haired, thin in the flank, vigilant, self-contained, quiet; giving you the impression that he would wake up quick and in strength. A speech from him is premeditated logic of inwoven facts and figures, delivered in a magnetic current which flows to the nerves of every man in his audience, however great he may be, and which penetrates through and through. It is impossible to escape impression from Boutwell's debate. As an adversary he would be fatal to a bad cause, formidable to a good one — as an ally he is a tower of strength.

=== African American civil rights ===
In July 1862, during a period when Northern antipathy toward the possibility that formerly enslaved Black people might migrate to the North was at its height, Boutwell gave a speech on the Capitol grounds in which he advocated freedom for African American slaves because it would keep them out of the North. He even urged Lincoln to dedicate the states of South Carolina and Florida for American Blacks: "I have heard that in the city of Brooklyn...there was a riot between the free white laborers and colored men.... What is the solution to this difficulty?... Freedom to the blacks. Then will they go from the North to the free territories of the South, to which by nature they belong. [Lincoln] should have made South Carolina and Florida free.... I would praise God ... if to-night I could hear, by the President's proclamation, that South Carolina and Florida were free and dedicated to the black population of the country. The competition with the white laborers of the North would cease."

On July 4, 1865, after the Civil War, Boutwell gave a speech that advocated African American suffrage, echoing Thomas Jefferson's assertion in the Declaration of Independence that "all men are created equal." He envisioned the postwar United States as a nation of equality where both whites and blacks could vote, and he believed that African American suffrage would secure the nation as well as protect African Americans.

Boutwell served on the Joint Committee on Reconstruction, which framed the Fourteenth Amendment, which gave African American freedmen citizenship and established the inviolability of the United States public debt. He advocated for the Fifteenth Amendment, which gave African American men the right to vote. "Mr. Boutwell is the last survivor of the Puritans of a bygone age," the French reporter Georges Clemenceau wrote, "a man after the heart of John Bunyan, too much of a fanatic to command the attention of the Senate, but too honest and sincere for his opinions to be ignored by his party."

=== Impeachment of Andrew Johnson ===
Boutwell opposed the Reconstruction policies of President Andrew Johnson from the first weeks of his administration. Arguing that any remaking of the former Confederate governments must begin with steps to open the electorate to Blacks as well as whites, he warned that Black rights and loyal Unionists' safety could be protected in no other way. In time, he turned into one of the most militant advocates of Johnson's impeachment, and by far the most respected of them. Unlike his colleagues, a hostile observer wrote, he brought to the cause "the advantage of a cultivated mind, an extensive reading and a scholarly acquaintance with all of history that could be mustered into such a service".

Serving on the House Committee on the Judiciary, he supported impeaching Johnson in the first impeachment inquiry against Andrew Johnson, a position the committee endorsed on January 25, 1867. In December 1867, he made the case to the full House for impeaching the president without charging him with having committed actual crimes – contending, in effect, that impeachment was a political, and not just a judicial process. He did not expect impeachment to pass and did not foresee the Senate convicting Johnson; rather he hoped for a statement from the House that the president had committed high crimes and misdemeanors, in effect a resolution of censure). The House overwhelmingly voted against impeachment.

Boutwell was a member of the House Select Committee on Reconstruction, which oversaw the second impeachment inquiry against Andrew Johnson beginning in late-January 1868. In February 1868, Johnson's removal of Secretary of War Edwin M. Stanton in contravention of Tenure of Office Act, which Stanton and Boutwell had drafted, united Republicans behind a resolution of impeachment, and Johnson was impeached, with Boutwell playing a role. After John Covode presented an impeachment resolution to the House on February 21, 1868, Boutwell successfully motioned that the resolution be referred to the House Committee on Reconstruction. In the morning of February 22, 1868, Boutwell and the other six Republicans on the committee voted in a party-line vote of 7–2 to refer a slightly amended version of Covode's impeachment resolution to the full House, and the amended resolution was presented to the House later that day. Boutwell voted to impeach Johnson when the House impeached him on February 24, 1868.

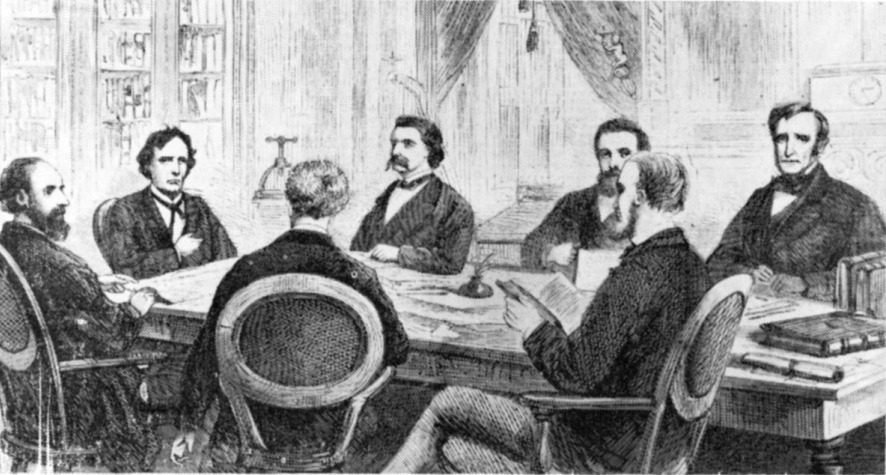
Illustration of the special committee drafting articles of impeachment. From left to right: Thaddeus Stevens, James F. Wilson, Hamilton Ward (back of head), John A. Logan, Boutwell, George Washington Julian, John Bingham

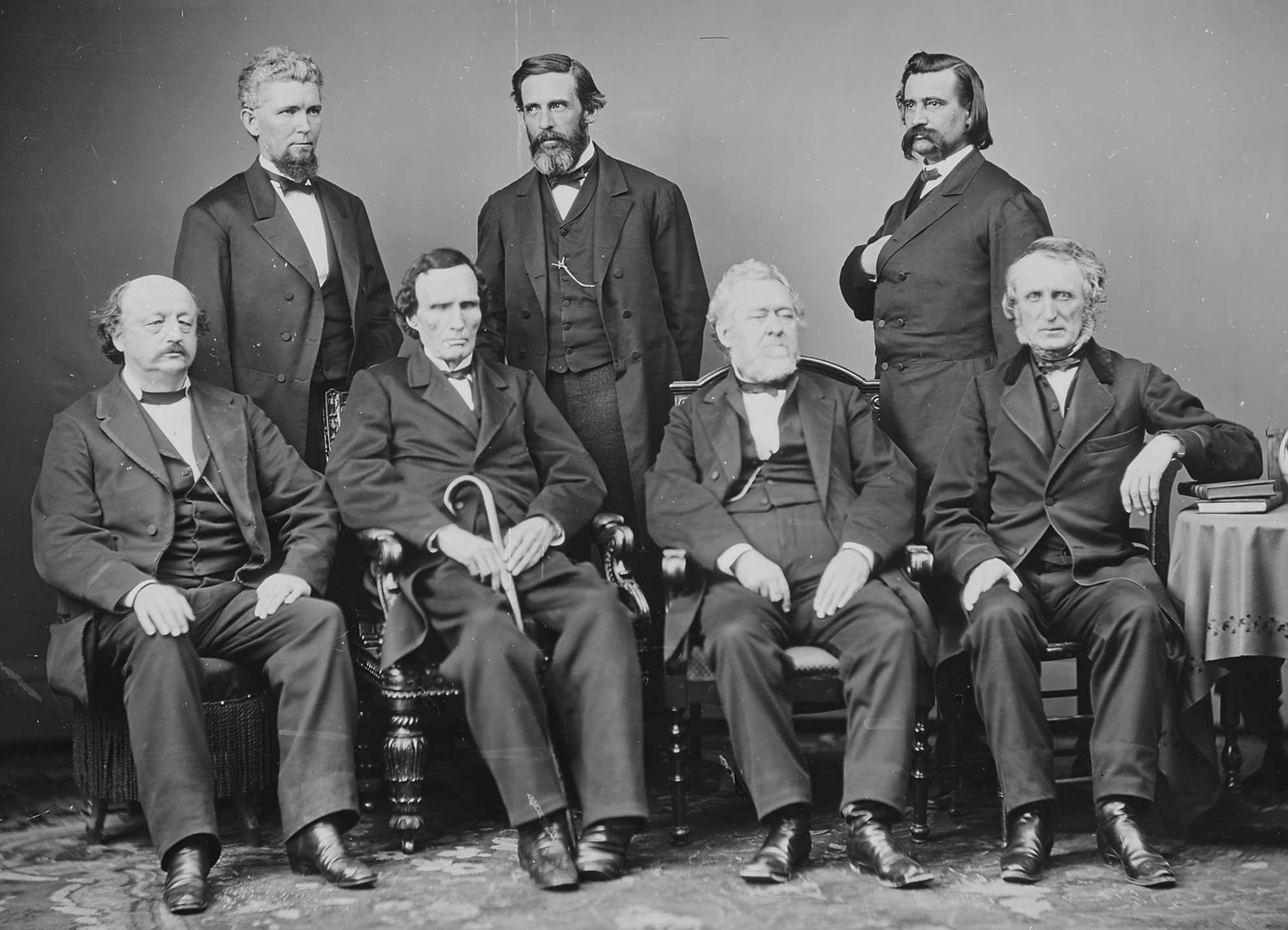
Johnson impeachment managers Seated L-R: Benjamin Butler, Thaddeus Stevens, Thomas Williams, John Bingham; Standing L-R: James F. Wilson, Boutwell, John A. Logan

After the impeachment resolution passed, Boutwell chaired the committee created to draft specific articles of impeachment, and presented the articles to the House for debate. He was thereafter chosen as one of the managers of the impeachment trial proceedings that followed. The bulk of the trial work was handled by fellow Massachusetts Congressman Benjamin F. Butler, although all seven managers were involved in developing the case against Johnson. Boutwell was given the honor of giving the first closing speech (all seven managers, and five defense lawyers, spoke). His speech was not particularly notable for its rhetoric, but defense lawyer William Evarts seized on Boutwell's strained analogy of casting Johnson into deep space to provoke significant laughter and applause. The impeachment failed by a single vote.

== U.S. Secretary of Treasury ==
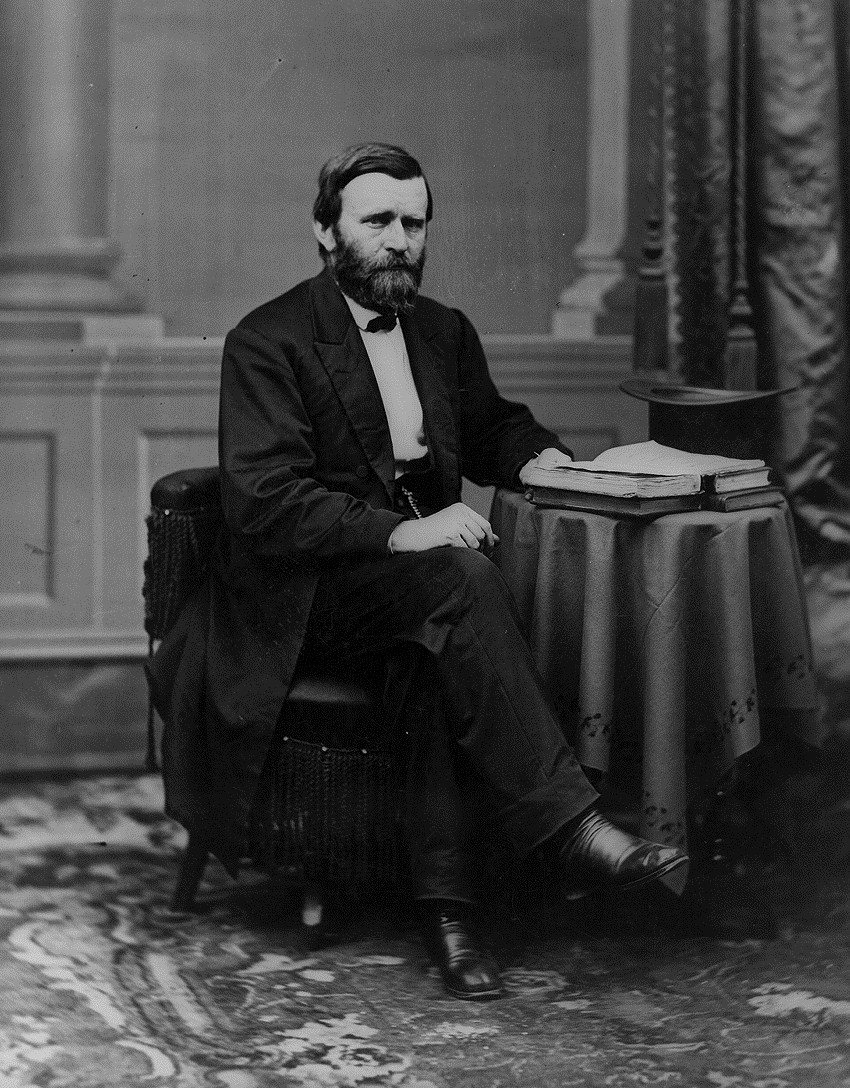
President Grant 1869

Boutwell was given serious consideration for a place in the cabinet of President-elect Ulysses S. Grant, and is reported to have declined the Interior Department. Within a week of the inauguration in 1869, Grant's first choice for the Secretary of the Treasury, Alexander T. Stewart, could not win Senate confirmation. Republicans on Capitol Hill, feeling that the cabinet lacked members who combined Washington experience with solid party credentials, urged Grant to nominate Boutwell, and, tendered the Treasury portfolio, Boutwell accepted. (Note: His selection caused some embarrassment to Grant's Attorney General, Ebenezer Rockwood Hoar, who was from Massachusetts. By custom, no state was allowed more than one Cabinet seat, and Hoar offered to retire. Grant refused the offer, but a year later, without warning or explanation, demanded his resignation.) The business community hailed Boutwell's selection. The news of his appointment created an immediate jump in the price of government bonds. "Nor is this to be wondered at," the Commercial and Financial Chronicle commented, "for Mr. Boutwell is well known as an earnest advocate of conservative financial reform. That he is an able administrative officer he gave conspicuous proofs when in 1862 he was entrusted with the organization of the new Internal Revenue Bureau." Boutwell, at that time popular for his two impeachment attempts of President Johnson, was easily confirmed by the Republican-controlled Senate. At Treasury, Boutwell often acted independently of President Grant and took on a haughty attitude toward other Cabinet members. Secretary of State Hamilton Fish noted that Boutwell was frequently evasive, noncommittal, and gave "no reasons, and rarely indicates or explains anything of his policy".

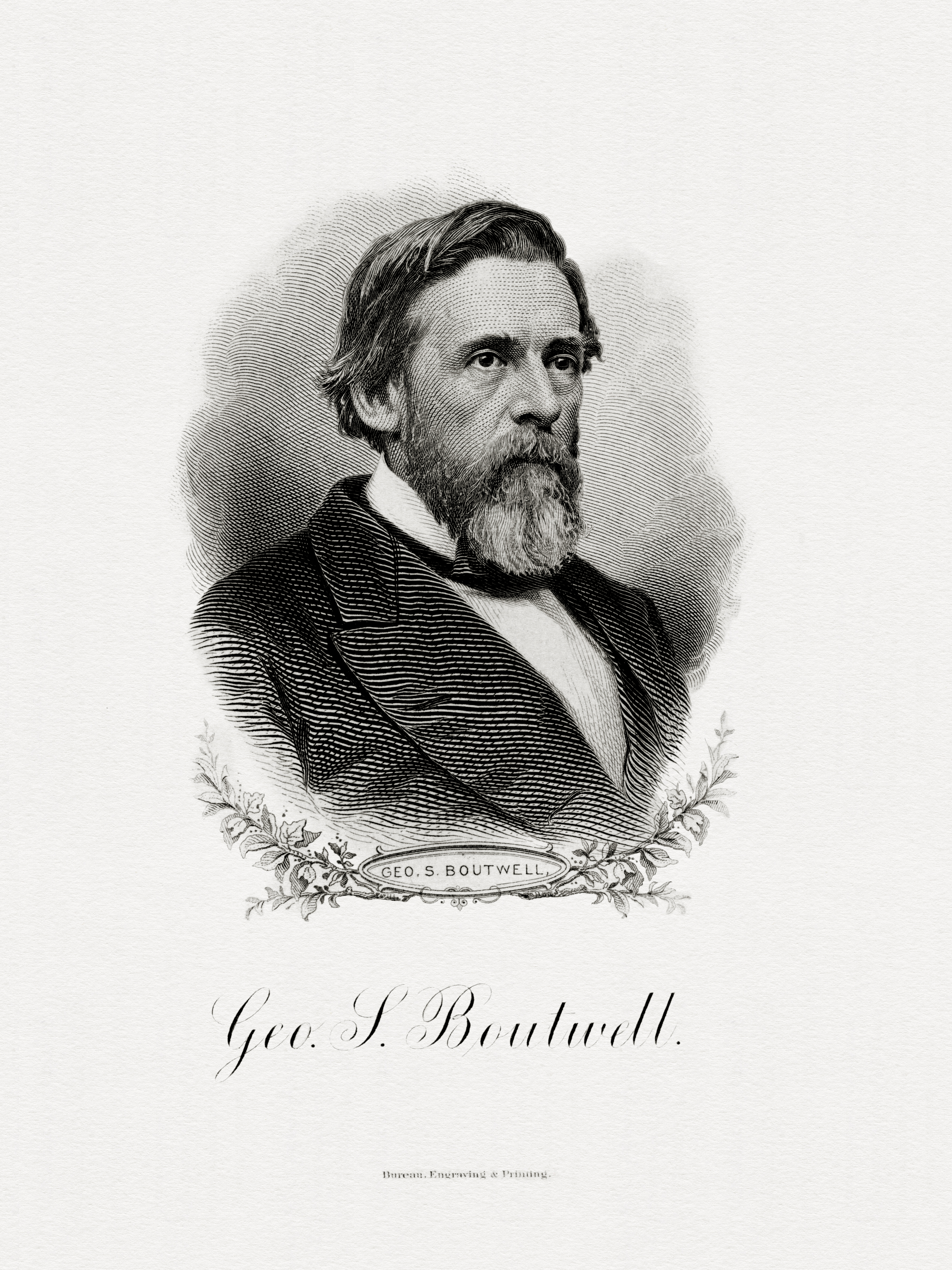
Bureau of Engraving and Printing portrait of Boutwell as Secretary of the Treasury.

=== Reforms (1869) ===
After the chaos of the Civil War, the Treasury Department was disorganized and needed reform. The controversy between President Johnson over Reconstruction and the impeachment trial in the Senate in 1868 forestalled any reforms in the Treasury Department. As Treasury Secretary, Boutwell's primary achievements were reorganizing and reforming the Treasury Department, improving bookkeeping by customs houses, incorporating the United States Mint into the Treasury and reducing the national debt.

=== Gold panic (1869) ===
In line with the Republican Party national platform of 1868, Boutwell advocated reducing the national debt and the return of the nation's economy to one based on gold. Boutwell believed that the stabilization of the currency and the reduction of the national debt was more important than risking a depression by withdrawing paper currency (greenbacks) from circulation. Without the approval or knowledge of President Grant or other Cabinet members, Boutwell began to release gold from the Treasury and sell government bonds, in order to reduce the supply of paper currency. As a result gold prices declined and the national debt was reduced. However, it also created a deflationary economy, in which farmers had trouble obtaining needed cash to pay for their farming activity.

During the summer of 1869, gold speculators Jay Gould and James Fisk plotted to corner the gold market by buying gold and influencing Grant to stop Boutwell's gold releases. Gould and Fisk initially told Grant that a higher gold price would help farmers sell more goods overseas, but Grant was not convinced. When harvests were reported to be good, Grant changed his mind and ordered Boutwell to stop releasing gold at the beginning of September 1869. Gould successfully maneuvered an informant, Daniel Butterfield, into a post as assistant to Boutwell and began buying gold in earnest, sending the price up. Grant was alerted to the attempt to corner the market by a courier-delivered letter from his brother-in-law Abel Corbin, who was in the gold ring, urging that the government refrain from selling gold. Grant met with Boutwell on September 22, and they decided the government should step in. On September 23, 1869, the Gold Panic reached its climax: Boutwell ordered the release of $4 million (~$85.8 million in 2025) of Treasury gold, but not before Gould, alerted via First Lady Julia Grant and Corbin, had managed to sell off some of his holdings. The price rapidly dropped from $160 to $135, creating panic among gold speculators. Brokerage houses were bankrupted and personal fortunes were lost, and the stock market was skittish for a year afterward. An investigation by Congress headed by Representative James A. Garfield exonerated both Grant and Boutwell in 1870. Boutwell's assistant, Daniel Butterfield, was fired by Grant for releasing inside information to Gould concerning the Treasury Department's releases of gold.

=== National debt (1870) ===
Boutwell opposed a rapid lowering of taxes and favored using surplus revenues to make a large reduction in the national debt. At his recommendation, Congress in 1870 passed an act providing for the funding of the national debt and authorizing the sale of certain bonds, but did not authorize an increase in the debt. In order to implement the restrictive law, Boutwell set up a banking syndicate to buy newly issued bonds at 4% and 5% in order to pay back Civil War bonds initially sold at 6%; that would alleviate the national debt. In order to implement the banking syndicate, Boutwell had to temporarily raise the national debt more than half of one per cent, for which he was accused of technically violating the law. The House Committee of Ways and Means later absolved him of this charge.

Boutwell had sought to finance some of the debt reduction through the placement of loans in Europe. This idea was complicated by Civil War claims against the United Kingdom, the so-called Alabama Claims resulting from the construction of CSS Alabama and other Confederate privateers in British ports, and then by the outbreak of the Franco-Prussian War shortly after the financing bill was passed. The latter prevented placement of offers in mainland Europe's financial centers, and the unresolved Alabama issues prevented their placement in London. Political pressure on both sides of the Atlantic resulted in the 1871 Treaty of Washington, after which Boutwell floated a loan in London. The first loan offer unravelled, however, because Boutwell offered it to too many banks, but a second, reorganized attempt led by financier Jay Cooke succeeded in raising over $100 million. It was the first time an American bank successfully engaged in this type of international transaction.

=== Ku Klux Klan bill (1871) ===
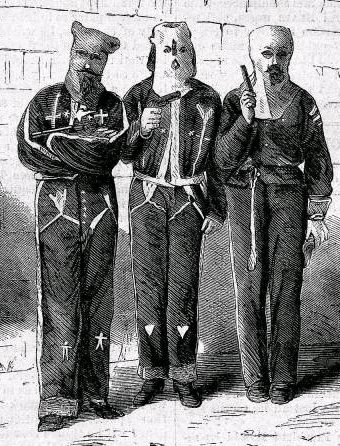
Mississippi Ku Klux Klan in costume arrested in 1871

Boutwell did not forget the plight of African Americans in the South who were subject to violence perpetrated by white Southerners, particularly the Ku Klux Klan. African Americans and loyal white Republicans were under attack in several Reconstructed states by the Klan. Congress responded, under the leadership of Benjamin Butler in the House of Representatives, and passed what was known as the Ku Klux Klan Act in 1871. Grant had signed two previous "force bills" to protect African Americans and having found that violence in the South continued to be rampant he decided to sign the third force bill that gave the President the power to suspend habeas corpus. Grant was initially reluctant to sign the bill, fearing he would acquire a reputation as a military dictator in the South. However, Boutwell encouraged Grant to sign the bill, pointing out the many violent atrocities taking place in the South. Grant promoted passage of the bill, and then signed it into law. He used the law to suspend habeas corpus in nine South Carolina counties and ordered the arrest and prosecution of Klan members.

== U.S. Senator ==
In 1873, when Massachusetts Senator Henry Wilson was elected to the vice presidency, Boutwell announced his intention to resign as Treasury Secretary, and made himself a candidate for the Senate vacancy. With support from Benjamin Butler and federal appointees working for Butler's machine, Boutwell defeated the candidate from the western end of the state, moderate Congressman Henry Laurens Dawes. A major campaign issue between Boutwell and Dawes was the Crédit Mobilier scandal, in which both Boutwell and Dawes were accused of receiving undervalued stock from Congressman and financier Oakes Ames. Both men had received shares, but Dawes returned his along with most of the realized profits. Butler's support for Boutwell was also disliked by the Massachusetts Republican establishment, which had come to despise Butler's tactics and politics.

Butler, who was hoping to run for governor in the fall of 1873, assumed that he could count on Boutwell's support, but as senator Boutwell refused to involve himself in the governor's race, and Butler was beaten for the Republican nomination after a bitter campaign. The following winter, Grant nominated Butler's ally William Simmons for the Collectorship of the Port of Boston, the most powerful federal patronage position in Massachusetts. Boutwell at first promised to fight it and then yielded to pressure from the Grant administration and Simmons was confirmed. This deal guaranteed that Massachusetts Republicans most opposed to Butler and what they called "Butlerism" would prevent Boutwell from being re-elected in 1877.

In the Senate, Boutwell served as chairman of the Committee on the Revision of the Laws in the 44th Congress. He took a strong stand for "honest money", a currency not reflated with paper money, and voted against the so-called Inflation Bill of 1874. He also remained a strong supporter of federal protection for Black voters in the South, backing the 1875 Civil Rights Law, which banned discrimination by common carriers and in public accommodations. He also favored high tariffs, a position of mixed favor in Massachusetts, which had some dependence on imports but also exported manufactured goods.

Boutwell was appointed in 1876 to head a special Senate committee to investigate the Mississippi elections of 1875. These elections were accompanied by significant orchestrated violence aimed at preventing African Americans from voting, and resulted in the return of Democrats to power there. Boutwell's commission documented the violence and atrocities that took place, but no federal action was taken to prevent a recurrence in the 1876 elections.

== Later career ==
After Boutwell left the Senate, President Rutherford B. Hayes appointed him in 1877 to prepare an updated edition of the Revised Statutes of the United States. This work entailed updating the law books to reflect changes made since 1873; Boutwell also reflected changes to the laws implied by all of the United States Supreme Court decisions to date. The updated work was published in 1878.

During the 1880s and 1890s Boutwell practiced international and patent law from offices in Boston and Washington, D.C. His business included working for the United States and other national governments as counsel to several bilateral diplomatic commissions. In the first, running from 1880 to 1884, he represented the US in regard to claims involving France which mostly emanated from the Civil War. He next served as counsel for Haiti (1885), and then again for the US on a commission with Chile (1893–94), which addressed claims against both governments most of whose origins were in either the War of the Pacific or the Chilean Civil War of 1891. In 1881, Boutwell declined to serve as Secretary of the Treasury under President Chester A. Arthur. He served for a time as a legal representative for the Kingdom of Hawaii, whose acquisition by the US he opposed.

In the late 1890s, Boutwell became increasingly disenchanted with the imperialist foreign policy of President William McKinley and left the Republican Party after the annexation of the Philippines following the 1898 Spanish–American War. He was a founder and the first president of the American Anti-Imperialist League, an organization opposed to American expansion. He campaigned against McKinley in 1900 and was a presidential elector for the Democratic ticket of William Jennings Bryan. He promoted Philippine independence until his death.

== Death ==
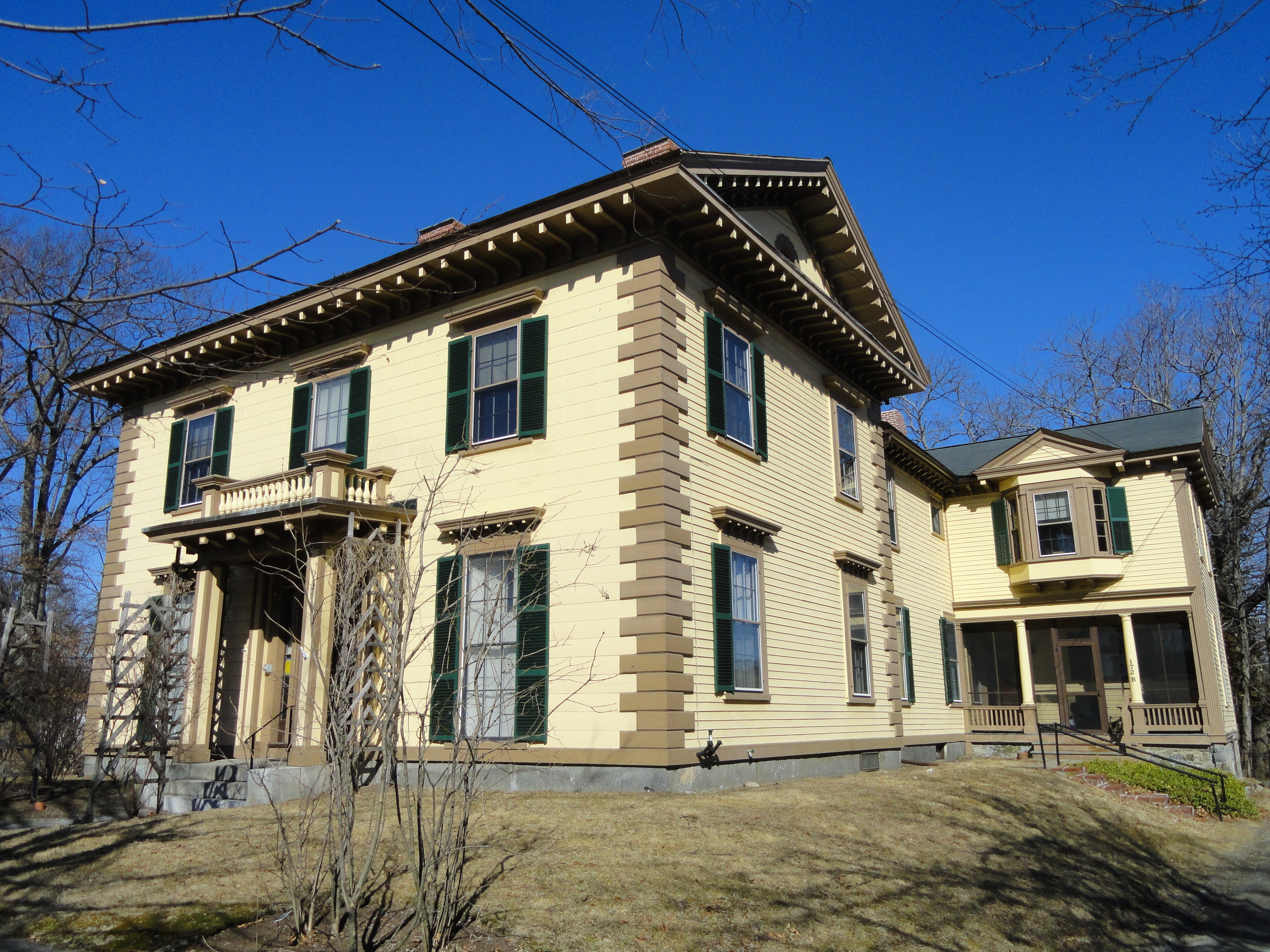
Gov. George S. Boutwell House, Groton

Boutwell died in Groton on February 27, 1905, and is buried at Groton Cemetery. He was memorialized in a major celebration at Faneuil Hall, Boston, on April 18, 1905. His house in the center of Groton, built in 1851 while he was governor, was given to the Groton Historical Society by his daughter, Georgianna. It now serves as the society's headquarters and is open in the summer as a museum. It is listed on the National Register of Historic Places as the Gov. George S. Boutwell House.

== In culture ==
Ruben Blum, the fictional narrator of Joshua Cohen's Pulitzer Prize-winning novel The Netanyahus: An Account of a Minor and Ultimately Even Negligible Episode in the History of a Very Famous Family, says that he wrote a biography of Boutwell titled George Sewall Boutwell: Abolitionist, Suffragist and Father of the IRS.

== Publications ==
Boutwell published several books on education, taxation and political economy. His works include the following:

- Educational Topics and Institutions (Boston, 1859)
- Manual of the United States Direct and Revenue Tax (1863)
- Decisions on the Tax Law (New York, 1863)
- Tax-Payer's Manual (Boston, 1865)
- Speeches and Papers Relating to the Rebellion and the Overthrow of Slavery (1867)
- Why I Am a Republican (Hartford, Conn., 1884)
- The Constitution of the United States at the End of the First Century (1895)
- Reminiscences of Sixty Years in Public Affairs (2 vols., New York, 1902) vol. 1, vol. 2

== Sources ==
- Ackerman, Kenneth (2011) [1988]. The Gold Ring: Jim Fisk, Jay Gould, and Black Friday, 1869. Falls Church, VA: Viral History Press. ISBN 9781619450059. OCLC 858981508.
- Boutwell, George S. (1867). Speeches and Papers relating to the Rebellion and the Overthrow of Slavery. Boston: Little, Brown. p. 180. OCLC 85888253.
- Boutwell, George S. (1902). Reminiscences of Sixty Years in Public Affairs. New York: McLure, Phillips & Co. OCLC 497975. (Volume 1, Volume 2)
- Boutwell, Jeffrey (2025). Boutwell: Radical Republican and Champion of Democracy. New York: W. W. Norton. ISBN 978-1-324-07426-7
- Boutwell, Jeffrey, "Saying What Lincoln Could Not Yet Say: George Boutwell, Emancipation, and the Great War Meeting of August 1862". Journal of the Abraham Lincoln Association, vol. 46, no. 1, Spring 2025, pp. 31-51.
- Brown, Thomas H. (1989). George Sewall Boutwell, Human Rights Advocate. Groton, MA: Groton Historical Society. ISBN 9780866100687. OCLC 21376428.
- Chernow, Ron (2017). Grant. New York: Penguin Books. pp. 674–678. ISBN 9780143110637.
- Cicarelli, Julianne (1996). "George S. Boutwell". Biographical Dictionary of the United States Secretaries of the Treasury: 1789–1995. Westport, CT: Greenwood Press. pp. 539–541. ISBN 9780313280122. OCLC 243857795.
- Clemenceau, Georges (1969) [1928]. American Reconstruction. New York: Da Capo. OCLC 300281122.
- Commemorative Exercises in Connection with the Erection of a Memorial Tablet to George Sewall Boutwell in Groton Cemetery May Fifteenth, 1908. Boston: unknown. 1908. OCLC 820622.
- Craughwell, Thomas (2013). Presidential Payola: The True Stories of Monetary Scandals in the Oval Office that Robbed Taxpayers to Grease Palms, Stuff Pockets, and Pay for Undue Influence from Teapot Dome to Halliburton. Beverly, MA: Fair Winds Press.
- Hart, Albert Bushnell (1927). Commonwealth History of Massachusetts. New York: The States History Company. OCLC 1543273. (five volume history of Massachusetts until the early 20th century)
- Holt, Michael (1999). The Rise and Fall of the American Whig Party: Jacksonian Politics and the Onset of the Civil War. New York: Oxford University Press. ISBN 9780195055443. OCLC 231788473.
- Jenkins, Sally; Stauffer, John (2010). The State of Jones: The Small Southern County that Seceded from the Confederacy. New York: Anchor Books. ISBN 9780767929462. OCLC 637127345.
- Josephson, Matthew (2015) [1934]. The Robber Barons: The Great American Capitalists, 1861-1901. New York: Harcourt Brace. ISBN 9780547544366. OCLC 556756268.
- McFeely, William S. (1981). Grant: A Biography. New York: W. W. Norton & Company. ISBN 0393013723.
- Pearson, Henry (1904). The Life of John Albion Andrew. Boston: Houghton Mifflin. p. 202. OCLC 1453615.
- Potter, Jerry (1992). The Sultana Tragedy: America's Greatest Maritime Disaster. Gretna, LA: Pelican Publishing. ISBN 9780882898612. OCLC 24318094.
- Rhodes, James Ford (1910). History of the United States: From the Compromise of 1850 to the Final Restoration of Home Rule at the South in 1877, Volume 7. New York: Macmillan.
- Sexton, Jay (2005). Debtor Diplomacy: Finance and American Foreign Relations in the Civil War Era, 1837–1873. Oxford: Clarendon. ISBN 9781429470940. OCLC 138700962.
- Smith, Jean Edward (2001). Grant. New York: Simon & Schuster. ISBN 0684849275.
- Stewart, David O. (2009). Impeached: The Trial of President Andrew Johnson and the Fight for Lincoln's Legacy. New York: Simon and Schuster. ISBN 9781416547495.
- Storey, Moorfield; Emerson, Edward Waldo (1911). Ebenezer Rockwood Hoar: A Memoir. Boston and New York: Houghton Mifflin. OCLC 2040488.
- Strouse, Jean (1999). Morgan: American Financier. New York: Random House. ISBN 9780375501661. OCLC 39484870.
- Voegeli, V. Jacque (November 2003). "A Rejected Alternative: Union Policy and the Relocation of Southern 'Contrabands' at the Dawn of Emancipation". Journal of Southern History. 69 (4): 765–790. doi:10.2307/30040096. JSTOR 30040096.
- Wang, Xi (1997). The Trial of Democracy: Black Suffrage and Northern Republicans, 1860–1910. Athens, GA: University of Georgia Press. ISBN 9780820318370. OCLC 33442896.
- Williams, Lou Falkner (2004). The Great South Carolina Ku Klux Klan Trials, 1871–1872. Athens, GA: University of Georgia Press. ISBN 9780820326597. OCLC 56639465.
- Wilson, J. G.; Fiske, J., eds. (1900). "Boutwell, George Sewall" . Appletons' Cyclopædia of American Biography. New York: D. Appleton.

Party political offices
Preceded by Caleb Cushing	Democratic nominee for Governor of Massachusetts; 1849, 1850, 1851	Succeeded by Henry W. Bishop
Political offices
Preceded by George N. Briggs	Governor of Massachusetts; 1851–1853	Succeeded by John H. Clifford
Preceded by Hugh McCulloch	United States Secretary of the Treasury; 1869–1873	Succeeded by William Richardson
Government offices
New office	Commissioner of Internal Revenue; 1862–1863	Succeeded by Joseph J. Lewis
U.S. House of Representatives
Preceded by Daniel W. Gooch	Member of the U.S. House of Representatives from Massachusetts's 7th congressional district 1863–1869	Succeeded by George M. Brooks
U.S. Senate
Preceded by Henry Wilson	U.S. Senator (Class 2) from Massachusetts; 1873–1877; Served alongside: Charles Sumner, William B. Washburn, Henry L. Dawes	Succeeded by George Hoar
