= Constantine C. Esty =

American politician

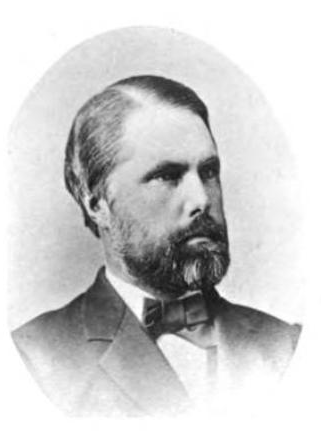

Member of the U.S. House of Representatives from Massachusetts's 7th district
- In office December 2, 1872 – March 3, 1873
- Preceded by: George M. Brooks
- Succeeded by: Ebenezer R. Hoar

Member of the Massachusetts House of Representatives
- In office 1867

Member of the Massachusetts Senate
- In office 1857-1858

Personal details
- Born: December 26, 1824 Framingham, Massachusetts
- Died: December 27, 1912 (aged 88) Framingham, Massachusetts
- Party: Republican
- Spouse: Emily Susanna (March) Esty
- Relations: Alexander Rice Esty, brother
- Children: Mary LeBaron Esty, Frederick March Esty, Charles Canaris Esty, Catherine Monroe Esty, Alexander N. Esty
- Education: Yale College
- Profession: Attorney

Constantine Canaris Esty (December 26, 1824 – December 27, 1912) was a U.S. representative from Massachusetts.

Born in Framingham, Massachusetts to Dexter Esty, Esty attended the local academies of Framingham and Leicester. His brother was architect Alexander Rice Esty. Esty was a descendant of Mary Towne Esty who was executed during the Salem Witch Trials.

Esty was graduated from Yale College in 1845 where he was a member of Skull and Bones. He studied law. He was admitted to the bar and commenced practice in Framingham, Massachusetts, in 1847. He served in the State senate in 1857 and 1858. He served as member of the State house of representatives in 1867. He was appointed assessor of internal revenue by President Lincoln in 1862 and served until he was removed for political reasons by President Johnson in 1866. Reappointed by him in 1867. He resigned in 1872.

Esty was elected as a Republican to the Forty-second Congress to fill the vacancy caused by the resignation of George M. Brooks and served from December 2, 1872, to March 3, 1873. He was not a candidate for renomination in 1872. He continued the practice of his profession in Framingham, Massachusetts, until his death there December 27, 1912. He was interred in Edgell Grove Cemetery.

U.S. House of Representatives
Preceded by George M. Brooks	Member of the U.S. House of Representatives from Massachusetts's 7th congressional district 1872–1873	Succeeded by Ebenezer R. Hoar
