= Ebenezer R. Hoar =

American judge (1816–1895)

Ebenezer Hoar
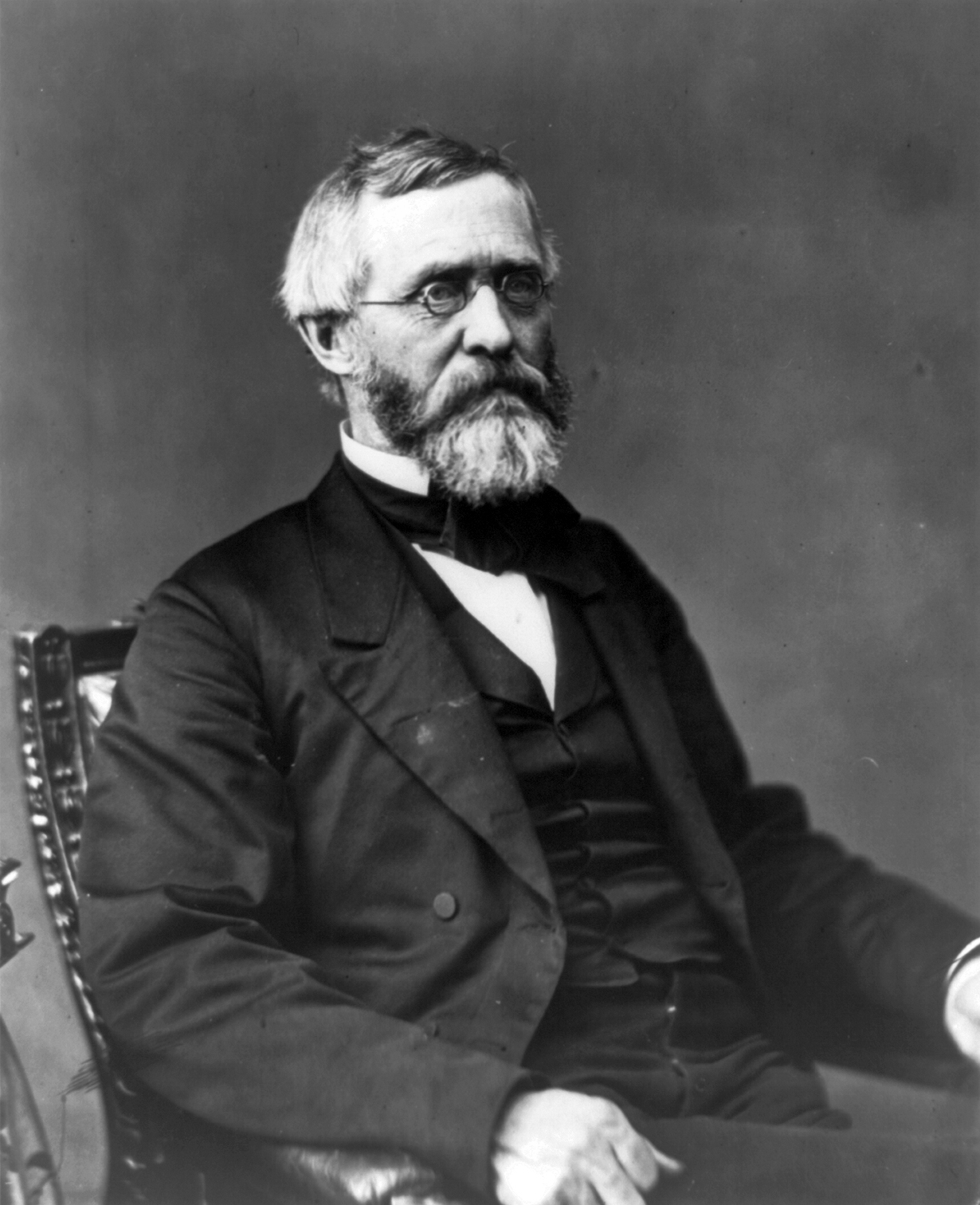

Member of the U.S. House of Representatives from Massachusetts's 7th district
- In office March 4, 1873 – March 3, 1875
- Preceded by: Constantine Esty
- Succeeded by: John Tarbox

30th United States Attorney General
- In office March 5, 1869 – November 22, 1870
- President: Ulysses Grant
- Preceded by: William Evarts
- Succeeded by: Amos Akerman

Associate Justice of the Massachusetts Supreme Judicial Court
- In office 1859–1869
- Preceded by: Benjamin Thomas
- Succeeded by: Marcus Morton

Judge of the Court of Common Pleas
- In office 1849–1855

Member of the Massachusetts Senate
- In office 1846–1848

Personal details
- Born: Ebenezer Rockwood Hoar; February 21, 1816 Concord, Massachusetts, U.S.
- Died: January 31, 1895 (aged 78) Concord, Massachusetts, U.S.
- Party: Whig (Before 1854); Republican (1854–1895)
- Spouse: Caroline Brooks (m. 1840; died 1892)
- Education: Harvard University (AB, LLB)

Ebenezer Rockwood Hoar (February 21, 1816 – January 31, 1895) was an American politician, lawyer, and jurist from Massachusetts. He served as U.S. Attorney General from 1869 to 1870, and was the first head of the newly created Department of Justice. Hoar assisted President Ulysses S. Grant in appointing two United States Supreme Court justices and was himself nominated to the Court. His nomination was rejected by the United States Senate, in part for his positions on patronage reform. In 1871, Hoar was appointed by Grant to the United States high commission that negotiated the Treaty of Washington between the U.S. and the United Kingdom, helping to settle the Alabama Claims.

== Early life and legal career ==
Ebenezer Rockwood Hoar was born in Concord, Massachusetts, on February 21, 1816, to Samuel and Sarah Hoar (née Sherman). Hoar came from a long line of Puritan ancestry. His family had emigrated to America in 1640, initially settling in Braintree, Massachusetts. Hoar was sent to a religious private female teacher at the early age of two. By the age of three, Hoar was able to read the Bible fluently as an adult. By four, Hoar was fully literate, having surpassed his older sister in reading and writing. As Hoar grew up he was known for quick thinking and witty sayings. In 1831, Hoar entered Harvard University at the age of fifteen. Upon graduation in 1835, he moved West and served as an instructor at a school for girls in Pittsburgh. After teaching, he traveled to Kentucky and heard the famous politician Henry Clay speak, then returned to Concord to study law at his father's office. In 1837, Hoar returned to Harvard where he studied law for eighteen months and for six months in the law office of Emory Washburn. On September 30, 1839, he passed the bar and had received a LL.B. degree from Harvard Law School, whereupon he practiced law in 1840 in Concord and Boston.

== Massachusetts politics ==
In the 1840s, Hoar began his political career as an anti-slavery member of the Whig Party. Hoar stated that he was a Conscience Whig rather than a Cotton Whig, who represented the Massachusetts textile interests and the Southern cotton industry.

In 1846, Hoar was elected to the Massachusetts Senate. In 1848, Hoar worked with his father to form the Free Soil Party of Massachusetts. The new party opposed the extension of slavery in the Western territories.

In 1849, Hoar was appointed a Judge of the Court of Common Pleas in Boston and served until 1855.

In 1859, Hoar was appointed as an associate justice of the Massachusetts Supreme Judicial Court. While on the bench Judge Hoar was known for his critiquing of younger lawyers; one of those who impressed Hoar was Oliver Wendell Holmes Jr.

After the American Civil War, Hoar opposed the impeachment of President Andrew Johnson.

== Attorney General (1869–1870) ==
On March 5, 1869, President Ulysses S. Grant appointed Hoar the 30th Attorney General of the United States. All of Grant's appointments, including Hoar, were initially a shock to the Senate, since Grant chose his cabinet independently from leaders of the Republican Party. The Senate immediately approved all of Grant's appointments, and press reaction was generally optimistic, applauding Grant's cabinet as one free from "trickery and corruption." Hoar served as Grant's principal legal and political advisor, since Grant had never held public elected office until his election to the presidency. In July 1870, Hoar became the first attorney general to head the Department of Justice, created to strengthen the enforcement and investigation powers of the President.

=== Boutwell appointment ===
One of Hoar's first duties as Attorney General was to rule on the appointment of New York businessman Alexander T. Stewart as Secretary of the Treasury. Stewart was opposed by Senators Charles Sumner and Roscoe Conkling, who cited a 1789 law prohibiting any Secretary who was "concerned or interested in carrying on the business of trade or commerce." Stewart had proposed he renounce his legal title to any retail business until after his potential term ended. However, Hoar advised Grant that Stewart's plan was legally impractical. Taking Hoar's advice, Grant instead appointed George S. Boutwell as Secretary of the Treasury. Boutwell's appointment, however, made Hoar's continuance in Grant's Cabinet tenuous, since both Boutwell and Hoar were from Massachusetts during an era in which it was traditional and politically expedient to have no more than one presidential cabinet member from any single state.

=== Supreme Court nomination and rejection ===
On December 14, 1869, President Grant nominated Hoar to the associate justice seat on the United States Supreme Court created by the Judiciary Act of 1869. The nomination engendered much controversy. As Attorney General, Hoar had alienated senators by not consulting them before recommending to the president nominees for circuit judge. In addition, senators were indignant about Hoar's positions on patronage reform and about his previous opposition to the impeachment of Andrew Johnson. The nomination was referred to the Senate Judiciary Committee, which recommended against confirmation. On February 3, 1870, the Senate rejected Hoar 24–33 in a roll call vote.

Grant had an additional associate justice to fill in December 1869, when Robert C. Grier retired. Grant nominated Secretary of War Edwin Stanton to succeed Grier. Stanton was swiftly confirmed, but died soon thereafter before he took office.

On Hoar's advice, Grant nominated William Strong and Joseph P. Bradley to fill the twin vacancies. Both were easily confirmed.

=== Hepburn v. Griswold ===
One hour after both Strong and Bradley were submitted to the Senate, the Supreme Court ruled in Hepburn v. Griswold that the 1862 Legal Tender Act that had authorized the Treasury to print paper money as legal tender was unconstitutional. President Grant, Hoar, and his entire cabinet had been against the Court's 4–3 Hepburn ruling, believing that the nation's money supply would be reduced and that this would ruin the economy. On March 31, 1870, Hoar went before the Supreme Court and argued that the Hepburn decision caused instability in the national economy, in case the country needed to print money during an emergency, as had been done during the American Civil War. One year later, with justices Strong and Bradley on the bench, the Court reversed the Hepburn ruling in a 5–4 decision, making paper money legal tender. Although President Grant and Hoar were accused of packing the Court, Strong and Smith's names had been submitted to the Senate prior to the Hepburn decision.

=== Reconstruction ===
Hoar was a moderate Republican who opposed federal intervention in protecting African American citizens during Reconstruction. Hoar believed that Southerners would behave responsibly and find a way to protect African Americans. President Grant, however, had lost faith in the Southerners to comply with constitutional and federal law that protected African Americans.

In May 1870, Congress passed the first of three anti-terrorism laws known as Enforcement Acts to counter Klan violence in the South. In order to increase the federal government's investigative and enforcement powers, Congress created the Department of Justice and Solicitor General in June 1870. President Grant was under increased pressure to replace Hoar with a more Radical Attorney General, one who did not oppose federal intervention to stop lawlessness in the South.

=== Resignation ===
In June 1870, President Grant sent Hoar a letter that requested his resignation without explanation.

Hoar was initially shocked at the sudden resignation request, and went to see Grant, having previously taken pardon requests to Grant at the White House. President Grant told Hoar that Southern Senators wanted a Southerner in the cabinet and that he needed support from Southern Senators.

Hoar complied and sent Grant a letter of resignation. Controversy ensued when Grant's personal secretaries allowed Hoar's resignation letter to be disclosed to the press. None of Grant's other cabinet members knew that Grant had asked for Hoar's resignation.

Hoar remained in Grant's cabinet until November 1870, when his successor Amos T. Akerman was sworn in. Akerman was from Georgia and aggressively supported Reconstruction and the federal protection of African American civil rights.

== Alabama Claims ==
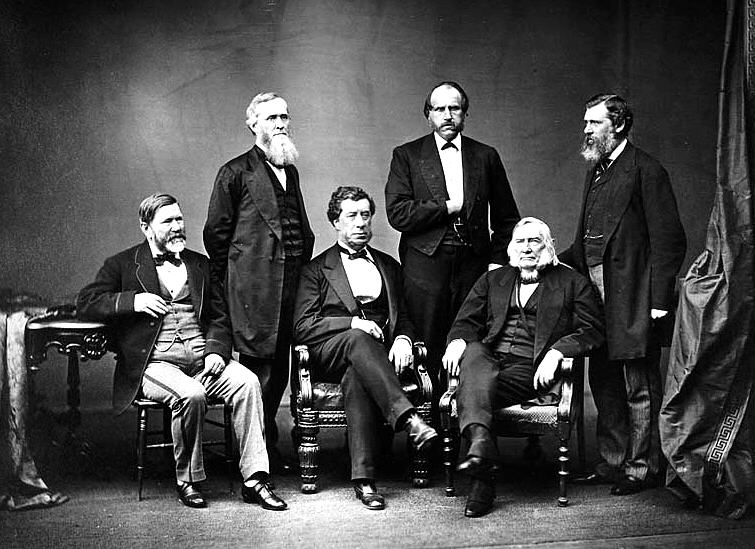
The American High Commissioners to the Treaty of Washington of 1871. U.S. Secretary of State Hamilton Fish served as chairman. From left to right: Robert Schenck, Ebenezer R. Hoar, George Henry Williams, Sec. Hamilton Fish, Samuel Nelson, J.C. Bancroft Davis. Brady – 1871

Hoar was one of five United States members of a joint high commission with the United Kingdom to settle Civil War claims, and also territorial claims in relation to the Dominion of Canada. The commission's work led to the signing of the Treaty of Washington in 1871. The treaty defined a method of international arbitration to settle disputed sovereign maritime and territorial issues, and also clarified the rules for maritime trade between Canada and the United States. The issues deferred to arbitration were: the Alabama Civil War claims, other claims and counterclaims growing out of the Civil War, the San Juan water boundary with the Dominion of Canada in Puget Sound, and Nova Scotia fishery rights.

A subsequent joint arbitration commission, acting under the treaty, issued a decision in September 1872, rejecting American claims for indirect war damages but ordering Britain to pay the United States $15.5 million (~$361 million in 2024) as compensation for the Alabama claims.

== U.S. Representative and retirement ==
Hoar was elected as a Republican to the 43rd Congress (1873–75). He was not a candidate for renomination in 1874 and returned to practicing law.

Hoar chaired the 1875 centennial celebration of the Battles of Lexington and Concord, held in Concord and attended by many leading individuals of the day, including President Grant. He also served on the board of overseers of Harvard University from 1868 through 1882.

== Personal life ==
While studying law at Harvard, Hoar met Caroline Downes Brooks (1820–1892) of Concord. The two married on November 20, 1840. Their marriage produced seven children, Caroline, Samuel, Charles Emerson, Clara Downes, Elizabeth, and Sherman; Sarah Sherman died an infant. The Hoar marriage was happy; however, Caroline had suffered from illness for many years.

Caroline was the half-sister of US Representative George M. Brooks of Massachusetts.

=== Hoar family ===
Hoar's father Samuel Hoar was an influential lawyer and politician. Through his mother, Sarah Sherman, E. Rockwood Hoar was the grandson of American founding father Roger Sherman and Rebecca Minot Prescott. Hoar's brother George Frisbie Hoar served as U.S. Senator from Massachusetts from 1877 to his death in 1904. Hoar's children include U.S. Representative Sherman Hoar (1860–1898) and Samuel Hoar (1845–1904). Hoar's grandchildren include Massachusetts State Senator and Assistant Attorney General Roger Sherman Hoar. Hoar's first cousin Roger Sherman Baldwin was a U.S. Senator and Governor of Connecticut. Another first cousin, William Maxwell Evarts, was a U.S. Senator and Secretary of State (and immediately preceded Hoar as U.S. Attorney General), and yet another one, Sherman Day, was a California State Senator, 1855–56, U.S. Surveyor General, 1868–71, and an original trustee of the University of California. Hoar is distantly related to political commentator Tucker Carlson.

== Death ==
Hoar died in Concord in 1895. He is interred in Concord's Sleepy Hollow Cemetery.

== See also ==
- Unsuccessful nominations to the Supreme Court of the United States

== Sources ==
- United States Congress. "Ebenezer R. Hoar (id: H000653)". Biographical Directory of the United States Congress. "HOAR, Ebenezer Rockwood, (1816–1895)"
- Butler, Benjamin Franklin. Letter of General Benj. F. Butler, to Hon. E. R. Hoar. [Lowell?, Mass.]: N.p., 1876.
- Cox, Jacob Dolson. "How Judge Hoar Ceased to be Attorney General", Atlantic Monthly July 1895, p. 162–173. (Available online: Making of America. Cornell University Library)
- Hoar, Ebenezer Rockwook. Charge to the Grand Jury, at the July Term of the Municipal Court, in Boston, 1854. Little Brown and Company. 1854.
- Hoar, Ebenezer Rockwood. Address at the laying of the corner stone of the Memorial Hall. Boston: Tolman & White, printers, 1870.
- Hoar, Ebenezer Rockwood. Address in the old Concord Meeting House, April 19, 1894. Boston: Beacon Press, T. Todd, printer, 1894.
- Hoar, George Frisbie. The charge against President Grant and Attorney General Hoar of packing the Supreme Court of the United States. Worcester, Mass.: Press of C. Hamilton, [1896?]
- Massachusetts. Bar. Tributes to the Bar and of the Supreme Judicial Court of the Commonwealth to the memory of Ebenezer Rockwood Hoar. Cambridge, Mass.: J. Wilson and Son, University Press, 1895.
- "E. Rockwood Hoar Dead" (PDF). The New York Times. February 1, 1895.
- Storey, Moorfield, and Edward W. Emerson. Ebenezer Rockwood Hoar: A Memoir, Boston and New York: Houghton Mifflin, 1911.

Legal offices
Preceded by Benjamin Thomas	Associate Justice of the Massachusetts Supreme Judicial Court; 1859–1869	Succeeded by Marcus Morton
Preceded by William Evarts	United States Attorney General; 1869–1870	Succeeded by Amos Akerman
U.S. House of Representatives
Preceded by Constantine Esty	Member of the U.S. House of Representatives from Massachusetts's 7th congressional district 1873–1875	Succeeded by John Tarbox
