= Middlesex Probate and Family Court =

The Middlesex Probate and Family Court is the court with jurisdiction over probate and family matters in Middlesex County, Massachusetts. It has two locations: 10-U Commerce Way, Woburn and 370 Jackson Street, 5th floor, Lowell.

== Jurisdiction ==
The court has "exclusive jurisdiction over probate matters such as wills, trusts, guardianships, and conservatorships. The court also has jurisdiction over family-related matters such as divorce, support, paternity establishment, family abuse protection, elderly abuse protection, disabled person's abuse protection, custody, and adoption."
